= Airbus A220 =

Canadian narrow-body airliner family

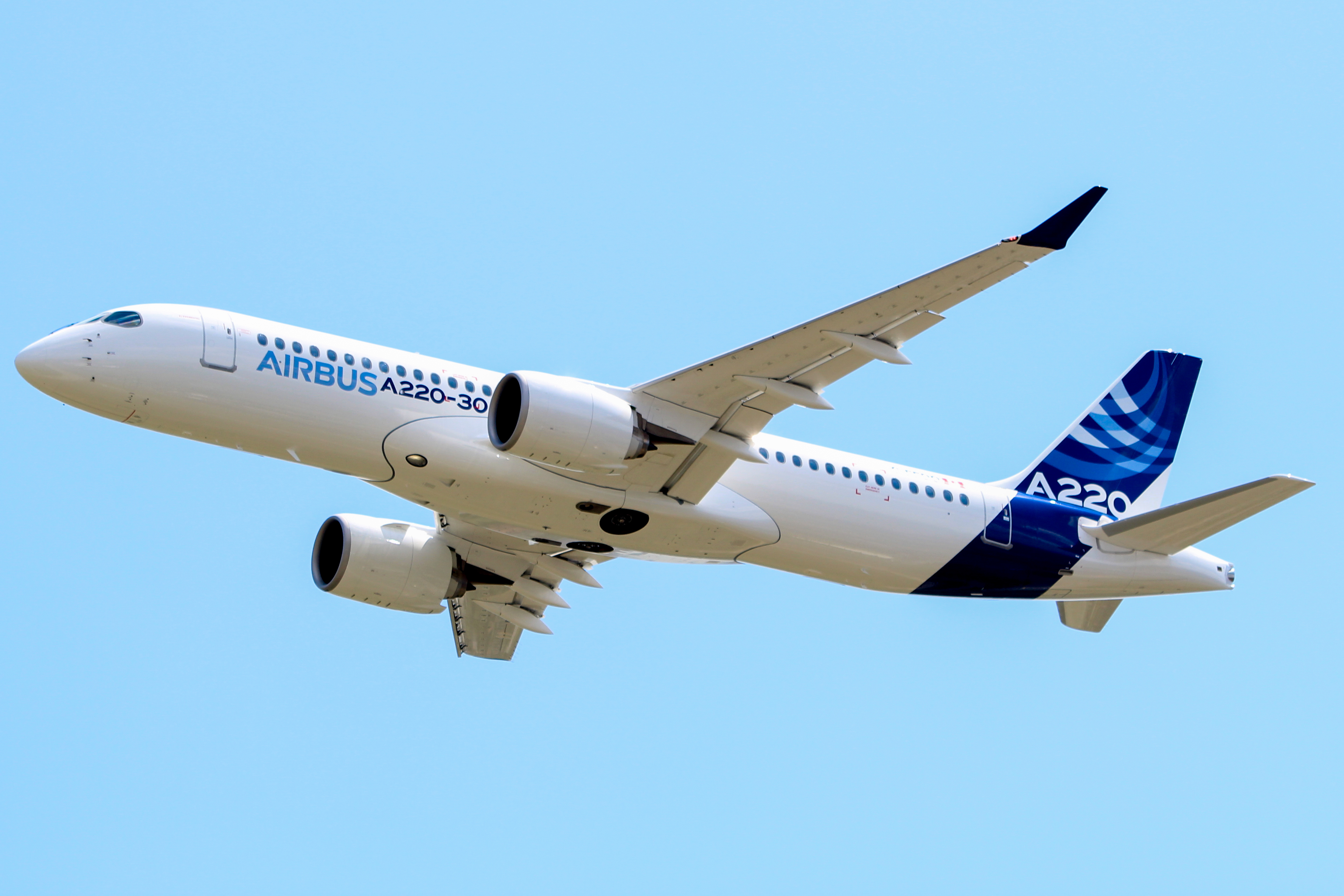
- An A220-300, the larger and more common variant, shown in Airbus livery

General information
- Other name: Bombardier CSeries
- Role: Narrow-body airliner
- National origin: Canada (Note: Final assembly in Canada and the United States.)
- Manufacturer: Bombardier (2012–2018); Airbus (2018–present)
- Status: In service
- Primary users: Delta Air Lines: JetBlue; Breeze Airways; Air France
- Number built: 559 as of October 2026

History
- Manufactured: 2012–present
- Introduction date: 15 July 2016 (10 years ago) with Swiss International Air Lines
- First flight: 16 September 2013 (13 years ago)

The Airbus A220 is a family of five-abreast narrow-body airliners by Airbus Canada Limited Partnership (ACLP). It was initially developed by Bombardier Aviation with the program launched on 13 July 2008 and had two years in-service as the Bombardier CSeries. The smaller A220-100 (formerly CS100) first flew on 16 September 2013, received an initial type certificate from Transport Canada on 18 December 2015, and entered service on 15 July 2016 with Swiss International Air Lines. The longer A220-300 (formerly CS300) first flew on 27 February 2015, received an initial type certificate on 11 July 2016, and entered service with airBaltic on 14 December 2016. Both launch operators recorded better-than-expected fuel burn and dispatch reliability, as well as positive feedback from passengers and crew.

The rebranding to A220 took place in July 2018, after Airbus acquired a majority stake in the programme through a joint venture, which was subsequently renamed ACLP in June 2019. The A220 thus became the only Airbus commercial aircraft programme managed outside of Europe. In August, a second A220 final assembly line opened at the Airbus Mobile facility in Alabama, supplementing the main facility in Mirabel, Quebec. In February 2020, Airbus increased its stake in ACLP to 75% through Bombardier's exit, while Investissement Québec held the remaining stake.

Powered by Pratt & Whitney PW1500G geared turbofan engines under its wings, the twinjet features fly-by-wire flight controls, a carbon composite wing, an aluminium-lithium fuselage, and optimised aerodynamics for better fuel efficiency. The aircraft family offers maximum take-off weights from 63.1 to 70.9 t (139,000 to 156,000 lb), and cover a 3,450–3,600 nmi (6,390–6,670 km; 3,970–4,140 mi) range. The 35 m (115 ft) long A220-100 seats 108 to 133, while the 38.7 m (127 ft) long A220-300 seats 130 to 160. The ACJ TwoTwenty is the business jet version of the A220-100, launched in late 2020.

Delta Air Lines is the largest A220 operator with 96 aircraft in its fleet, while AirAsia is the largest customer with a total order of 150 aircraft as of October 2026. A total of 1,105 A220 family aircraft have been ordered of which 559 units have been delivered and 555 units are in service with 25 operators. The global A220 fleet has completed more than 2.41 million flights over 4.25 million block hours, transporting more than 240 million passengers to 540 destinations, with one smoke-related accident. The A220 family complements the A319neo in the Airbus range and competes with Boeing 737 MAX 7, as well as the smaller four-abreast Embraer E195-E2 and E190-E2, with the A220 holding over 55% market share in this small airliner category.

== Development ==
=== BRJ-X forerunner concept ===
BRJ-X, a four-abreast forerunner concept in early 1996

Bombardier began discussions with Fokker on 5 February 1996 about acquiring that company's assets, including the 100-seat Fokker 100 short-haul aircraft. However, after evaluating the potential purchase, Bombardier announced an end to the talks on 27 February, and two weeks later, on 15 March, Fokker was declared bankrupt. Bombardier then launched the BRJ-X, or "Bombardier Regional Jet eXpansion" on 8 September, a larger regional jet than the CRJ Series or "Canadair Regional Jet" due to enter service in 2003. Instead of 2–2 seating, the BRJ-X was to have a wider fuselage with 2–3 seating for 85 to 110 passengers, and underwing engine pods. It was comparable to the smallest narrow-body jetliners, like the 2–3 DC-9/MD-80/Boeing 717 or the 3–3 Airbus A318 and Boeing 737-500/737-600. At the end of 2000, the project was shelved by Bombardier in favour of stretching the CRJ700 into the CRJ900.

Meanwhile, Embraer launched its four-abreast E-Jet family for 70 to 122 passengers in June 1999, which entered service in 2004. Airbus launched its 107–117 passengers A318 on 21 April 1999, which entered service in July 2003, as Boeing had the 737-600 first delivered in September 1998.

=== CSeries feasibility study ===
Bombardier appointed Gary Scott on 8 March 2004 to evaluate the creation of a New Commercial Aircraft Program. A feasibility study for a five-seat abreast CSeries was then launched at the biennial Farnborough Airshow in July to investigate development of an aircraft to replace rival manufacturers' aging models: DC-9/MD-80, Fokker 100, Boeing 737 Classic and BAe-146 with 20% lower operating costs, and 15% lower operating costs than then-in-production models: Embraer E-Jet, Boeing 717, etc. The smaller variant (C110) would carry 110 to 115 passengers and the larger (C130) between 130 and 135 passengers over 3,200 nautical miles. The C110 was planned to weigh 60,420 kg (133,200 lb) at MTOW and have a length of 35.0 m (114.7 ft), while the C130 would be 38.2 m (125.3 ft) long and have a 66,000 kg (146,000 lb) MTOW. The aircraft would have 3-by-2 standard seating and 4-abreast business class, 2.1 m (7 ft) stand-up headroom, fly-by-wire and side stick controls. 20 percent of the airframe weight would be in composite materials for the centre and rear fuselages, tail cone, empennage and wings. The first flight was planned for 2008 and entry into service for 2010.

Bombardier's Board of Directors authorized marketing the CSeries on 15 March 2005, seeking firm commitments prior to program launch. In May, the CSeries development was evaluated at US$2.1 billion, shared with suppliers and partner governments for one-third each. The Government of Canada would invest US$262.5 million, the Government of Quebec US$87.5 million and the Government of the United Kingdom US$340 million (£180 million), repayable on a royalty basis per aircraft. The UK contribution would be part of an investment partnership for the development of the composite wings and other parts at the Belfast plant, where Bombardier bought Short Brothers in 1989.

=== Search for engines and one-year development break ===
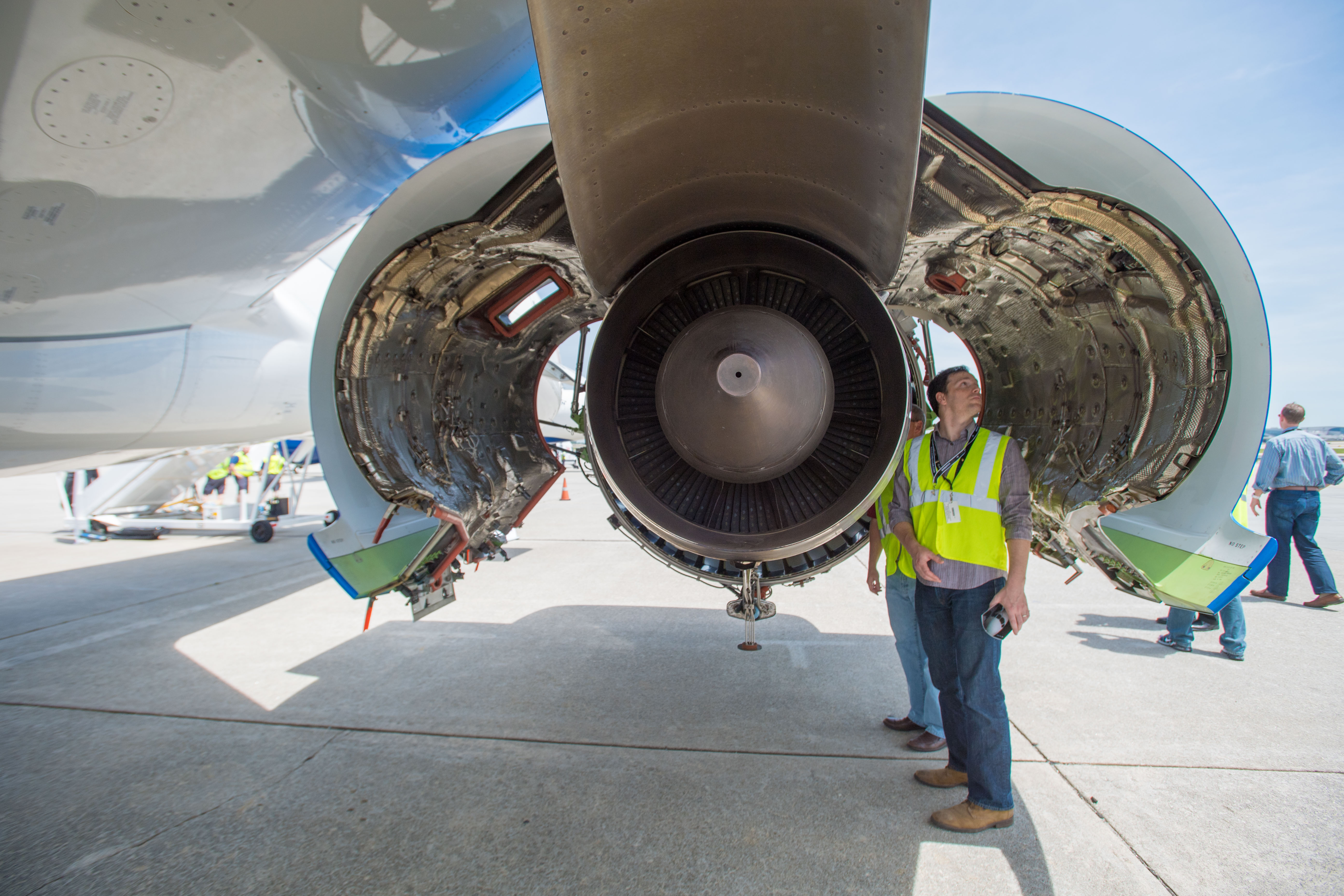
P&W’s new GTF engine was selected in late 2007 to power the CSeries; it was later designated the PW1500G.

Despite government support, Bombardier had difficulty finding the right powerplant for the CSeries in June 2005 after failing to get the two engine consortia International Aero Engines and CFM International to compete for the CSeries contract. The former engine manufacturer had offered a new centreline engine in the 93 to 102 kN (21,000 to 23,000 lb) thrust class, while the latter was not yet ready to offer its next-generation CFM56 engine, as Bombardier required a significant upgrade in the event of an engine derivative for the CSeries program. Both prospective engine suppliers for the CSeries program were uncertain about the aircraft market projections after Bombardier failed to address these concerns, but they left the door open to future discussions of a potential program. Bombardier then returned to Pratt & Whitney (P&W) in search of the right engine for the CSeries, although the company had already rejected a PW6000 derivative offered by P&W a year earlier, maintaining its original plan to launch the all-new aircraft program only with a new centreline engine as well.

Bombardier announced on 31 January 2006 that market conditions could not justify the launch of the program, and that the company would reorient CSeries project efforts, team and resources to regional jet and turboprop aircraft. A small team of employees were kept to develop the CSeries business plan and were further tasked to include other risk-sharing partners in the program.

Bombardier announced on 31 January 2007 that work on the aircraft would continue, with entry into service planned for 2013. In November 2007, Bombardier finally selected the P&W Geared Turbofan (GTF), subsequently designated the PW1500G, and already chosen to power the Mitsubishi Regional Jet, to be the exclusive powerplant for the CSeries, rated at 100 kN (23,000 lb).

=== Program launch and type redesignation ===
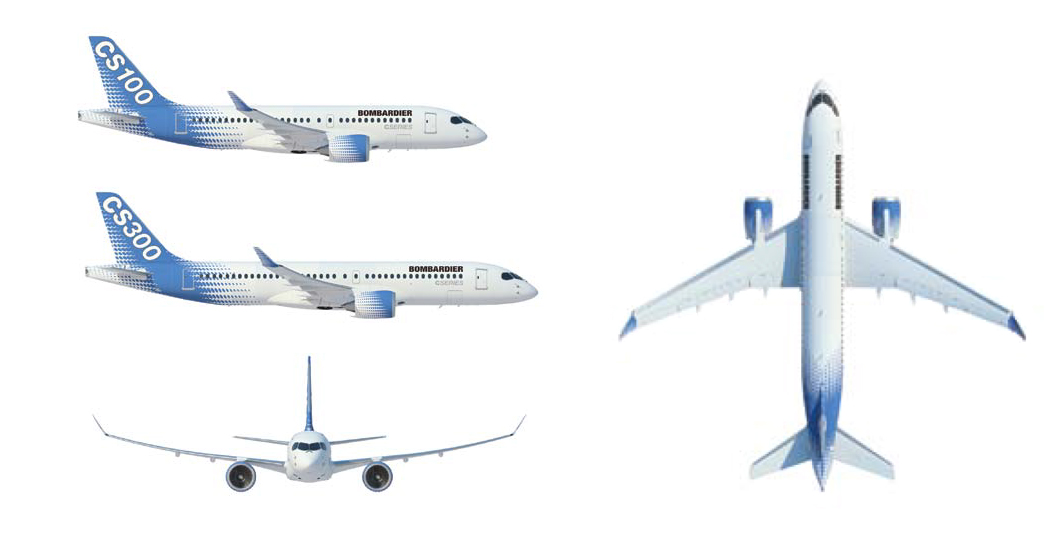
CSeries program was launched at the 2008 Farnborough Airshow with the C110 and C130 variants, which were redesignated CS100 and CS300 in 2009.

Bombardier's Board of Directors authorized offering formal sales proposals of the CSeries to airline customers on 22 February 2008, due to its 20% lower fuel burn and up to 15% better operating costs compared to similarly sized aircraft produced at the time. This interested Lufthansa, Qatar Airways and ILFC. In a press conference on the eve of the opening of the Farnborough Airshow on 13 July, Bombardier Aerospace formally launched the CSeries, with a letter of interest from Lufthansa for 60 aircraft, including 30 options, at a US$46.7 million list price. The aircraft fuel efficiency would be 2 litres per 100 kilometres (120 mpg_{‑US}) per passenger in a dense seating. Bombardier estimated the market for the 100- to 150-seat segment at 6,300 aircraft over twenty years, representing more than $250 billion in revenue, with the company expected to generate up to half of that.

Bombardier redesignated the C110 and C130 as CS100 and CS300, respectively in March 2009. The models were offered in standard- and extended-range (ER) variants; and additionally, an extra thrust (XT) variant of the CS300 was also offered. Bombardier subsequently settled on a single variant, with the ER becoming the new standard.

=== Prototype manufacturing ===
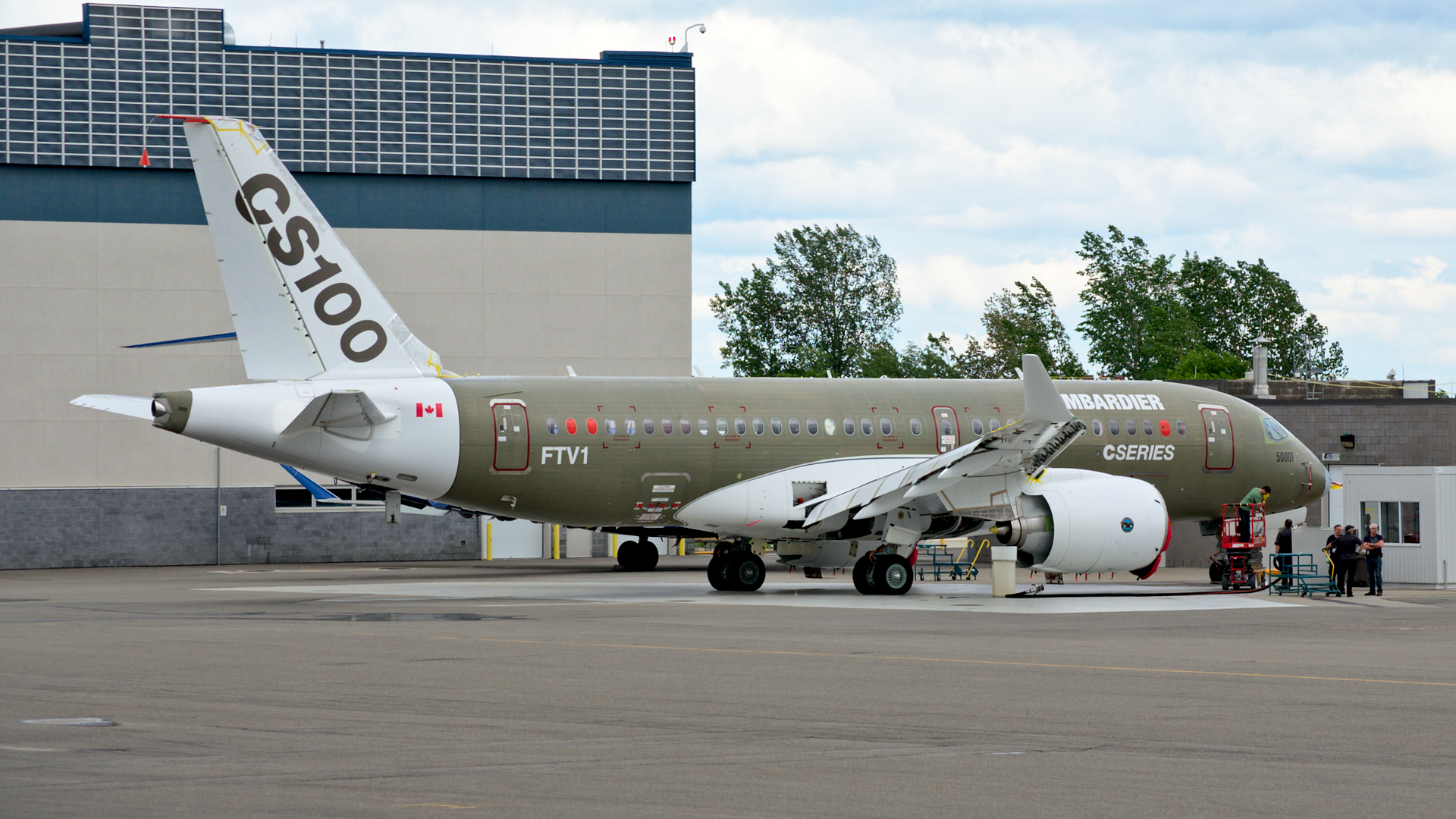
CSeries' first Flight Test Vehicle (FTV1), a CS100, out of the final assembly in Mirabel in June 2013.

At the program launch in July 2008, Bombardier announced that final assembly of the CSeries would be done in Mirabel, wings would be developed and manufactured in Belfast and the aft fuselage and cockpit would be manufactured in Saint-Laurent, Quebec. The centre fuselage was to be built by China Aviation Industry Corporation (AVIC)'s affiliate Shenyang Aircraft Corporation. In March 2009, Bombardier confirmed major suppliers: Alenia Aeronautica for the composite horizontal and vertical stabilisers, Fokker Elmo for the wiring and interconnection systems and Goodrich Corporation Actuation Systems: design and production of the flap and slat actuation systems.

By June 2009, 96% of billable materials had been allocated, with the company settling on various companies for remaining components and systems: Rockwell Collins for the avionics, Zodiac Aerospace for the interiors, Parker Hannifin for the fully integrated fuel and hydraulics systems, Liebherr-Aerospace for the air management system, and it was also anticipated that wireless In-Flight Entertainment (IFE) might be feasible when the CSeries entered service. By November, the first wing had been assembled at the Bombardier Aerostructures and Engineering Services (BAES) site in Belfast, Northern Ireland. In the same month, construction of a composite wing manufacturing facility at the Belfast site started and the first flight of the CSeries was expected by 2012. In 2010, Ghafari Associates was retained to develop the Montreal manufacturing site to accommodate the aircraft production.

=== Test preparation and high-density concept ===
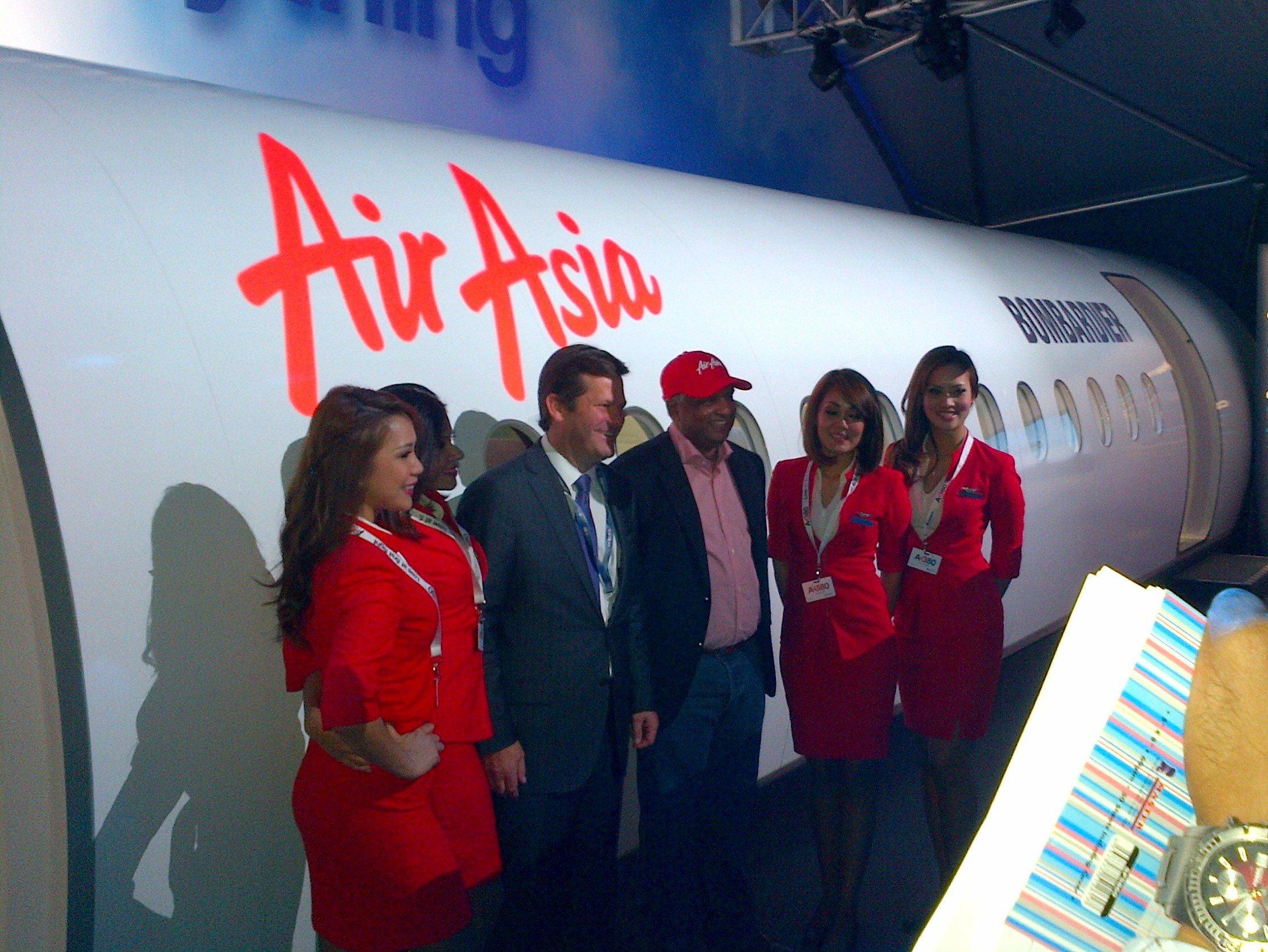
AirAsia was a potential customer for the high-density CS300 proposed at the 2012 Farnborough Airshow.

Bombardier was about to reach the design freeze for the CSeries in January 2010 and announced that CS100 deliveries were planned to start in 2013, and CS300 deliveries would follow a year later. In November 2011, Bombardier expected a second-half 2012 first flight as it wasn't to receive the first fuselage package until mid-2012 at the earliest and Pratt & Whitney still had "a little bit more work to do" to meet the requirement. In June 2012, Bombardier reaffirmed the first flight should happen before the year's end with subsequent entry into service remaining 2013. In July 2012, Bombardier began discussions with AirAsia at the Farnborough Airshow about a 160-seat high-density CS300 concept, which was subsequently added to the CSeries program in November, despite the low cost airline's refusal to order 100 units of this version. In the same month, Bombardier announced a six-month delay in both the first flight to June 2013 and the entry into service (EIS) of the CS100 a year later due to unspecified supplier issues in some areas of the program.

An extensive program update was presented on 7 March 2013, with the Flight Test Vehicle 1 (FTV1) was displayed in a near-complete state, along with three other FTVs in various states of assembly: one such FTV confirmed the 160 seat high-density concept for the CS300, featuring two sets of over-wing emergency exits. The first FTV's electrical system was powered up in March, while tests on the static airframe proceeded satisfactorily and on schedule. In June, Bombardier again delayed the first flight into July on account of software upgrades and final ground testing. On 24 July, after a protracted system integration process, the first flight was delayed into "the coming weeks". On 30 August, Bombardier received the flight test permit from Transport Canada, granting permission to perform high speed taxi testing and flight testing.

=== Flight testing & program delays ===
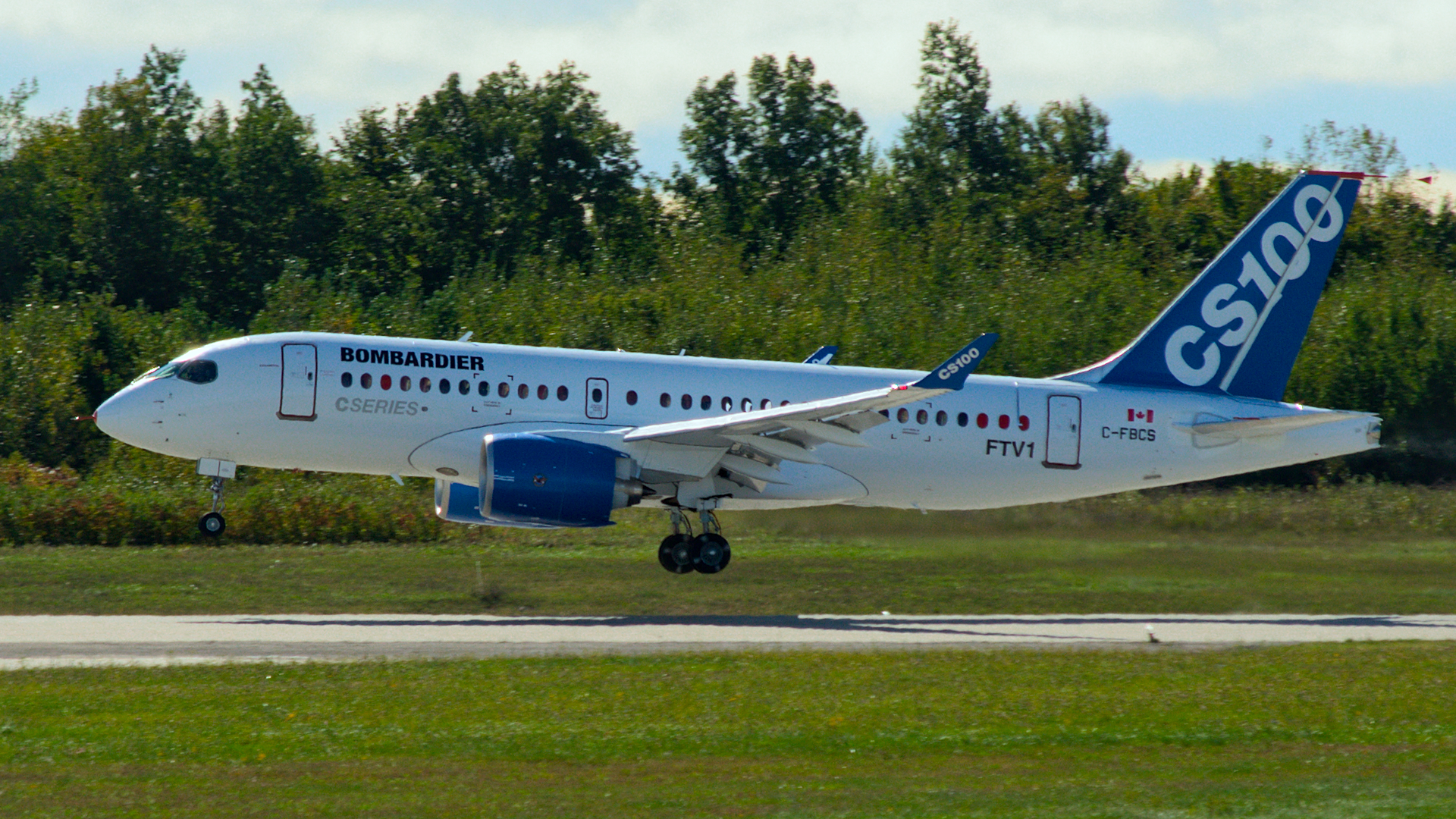
The CS100 took off for its maiden flight from Mirabel Airport in Quebec on 16 September 2013.

The CS100 (FTV1) took off for its maiden flight from Bombardier's facility at Montréal–Mirabel International Airport in Quebec on 16 September 2013. After reconfiguration and software upgrades, FTV1 flew for the second time on 1 October. The FTV2 completed its first flight on 3 January 2014, while the planned entry-into-service date was delayed into the second half of 2015 due to certification testing issues. On 29 May 2014, the FTV1 suffered an uncontained engine failure and flight testing of the four FTVs was subsequently suspended until an investigation could be completed. The incident kept Bombardier from displaying the CSeries at one of the most important aerospace events in that year, Farnborough Airshow. On 7 September, flight testing was resumed after the engine problem had been isolated to a fault in the lubrication system. On 18 September, Bombardier relocated the FTV4 to Wichita, Kansas (USA) joined FTV3 at the Bombardier Flight Test Center to take advantage of better weather for flight testing.

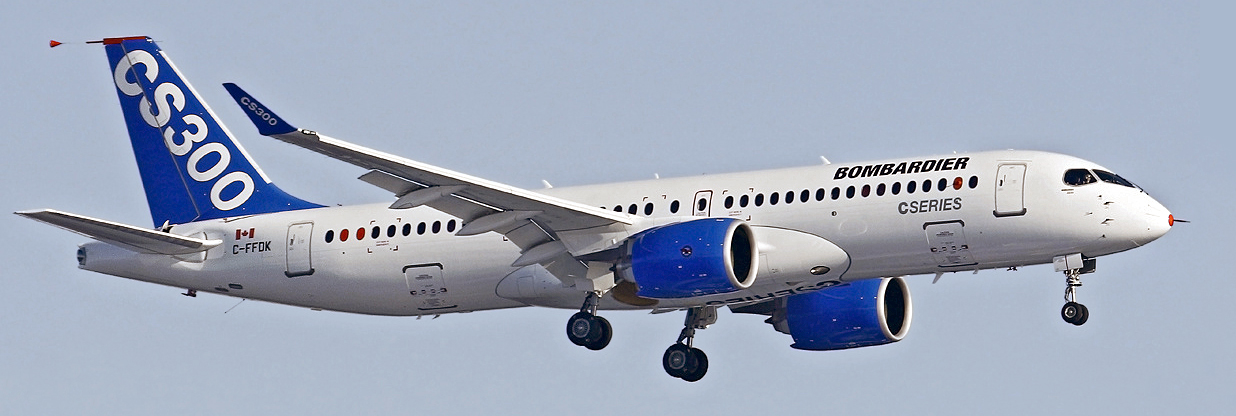
The CS300 on final approach after its first flight on 27 February 2015.

The CS300 (FTV7) made its maiden flight from Mirabel airport on 27 February 2015, seven days after the four tested FTVs had accumulated over 1,000 flight hours. The flight test results surpassed the company's guarantees for noise, economics and performance, meaning a longer range than advertised could be possible. The fifth CS100 (FTV5) with a complete interior made its first flight on 18 March, while the sixth CS100 (not officially designated as FTV6) was the first production unit used for function and reliability flights. At the Paris Air Show in June, Bombardier released updated performance data, showing improvements over the initial specifications. The CS100 passed the required certification tests by mid-November. On 25 November, Bombardier completed the first phase of its route proving capabilities, with a 100% dispatch reliability. The final prototype, FTV8, the second CS300 with a complete interior, made its first flight on 3 March 2016.

=== Type certification ===
The smallest model in the series, the 110- to 125-seat CS100, received type certificate from Transport Canada on 18 December 2015, and simultaneously from US Federal Aviation Administration (FAA) and European Aviation Safety Agency (EASA) in June 2016, clearing the way for delivery to the launch operator, Swiss International Air Lines.

The largest model, the 130- to 145-seat CS300, obtained its type certificate from Transport Canada on 11 July 2016, from the EASA on 7 October that cleared the delivery to its launch operator airBaltic, and from the FAA on 14 December 2016.

Both models were awarded a common type rating on 23 November 2016 simultaneously from Transport Canada and EASA, allowing pilots to qualify on both types interchangeably.

Bombardier conducted steep 5.5˚ approach landings tests at London City Airport (LCY) in March 2017, and announced one month later, April 2017, that the CS100 received Transport Canada and EASA steep approach certification.

=== Entry into service ===
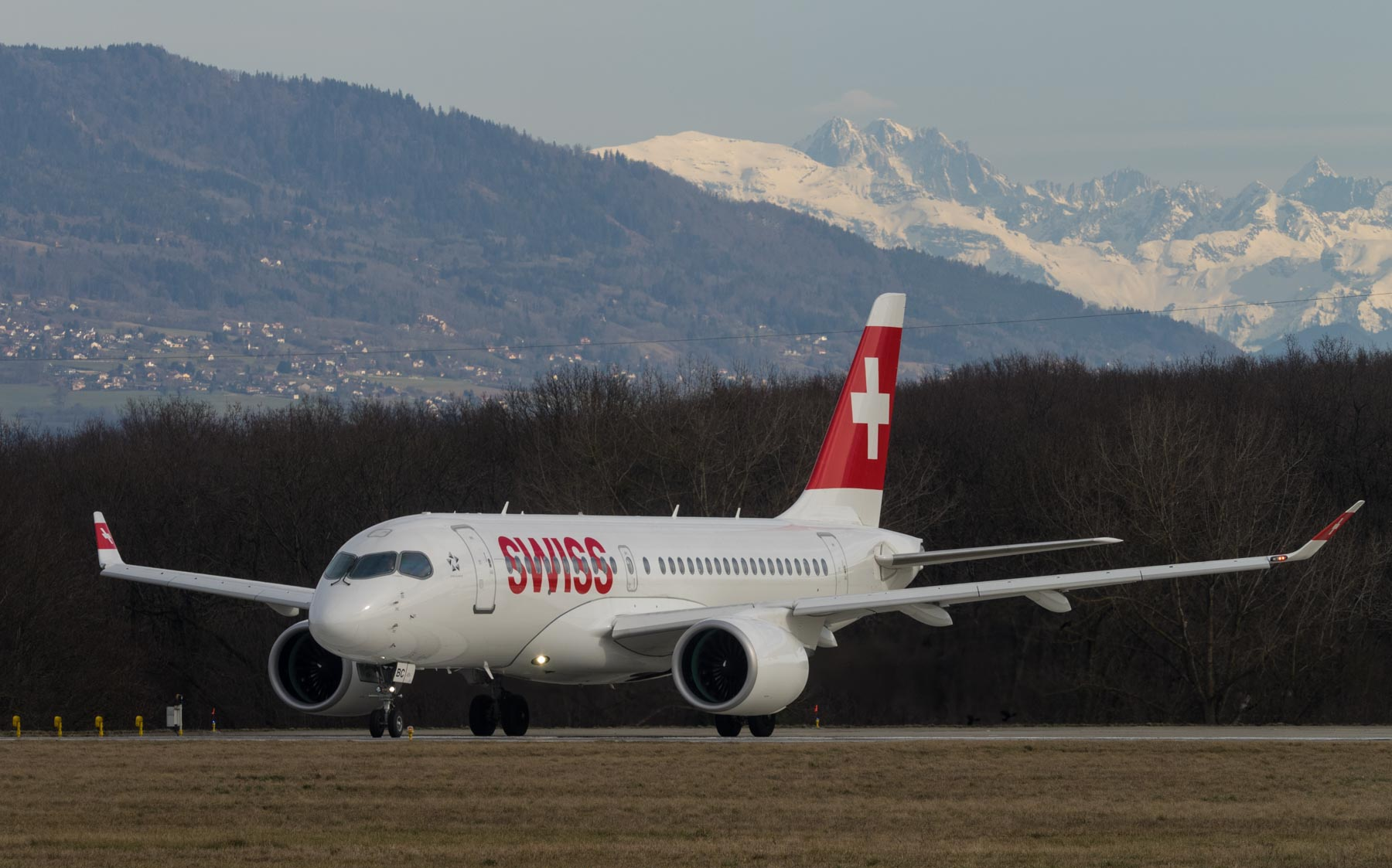
Swiss International Air Lines was the launch operator for the CSeries with the first CS100 in July 2016.

The first CSeries, a CS100, was delivered to Swiss Global Air Lines on 29 June 2016 at Montréal–Mirabel International Airport, and began commercial service on 15 July with a flight between Zürich and Paris. The launch operator stated in August, that "the customer feedback is very positive with the expected remarks concerning the bright cabin, reduced noise, enough leg room and space for hand luggage as well as the comfortable seats. Also, the feedback from our pilots is gratifying. They especially like the intuitive flying experience."

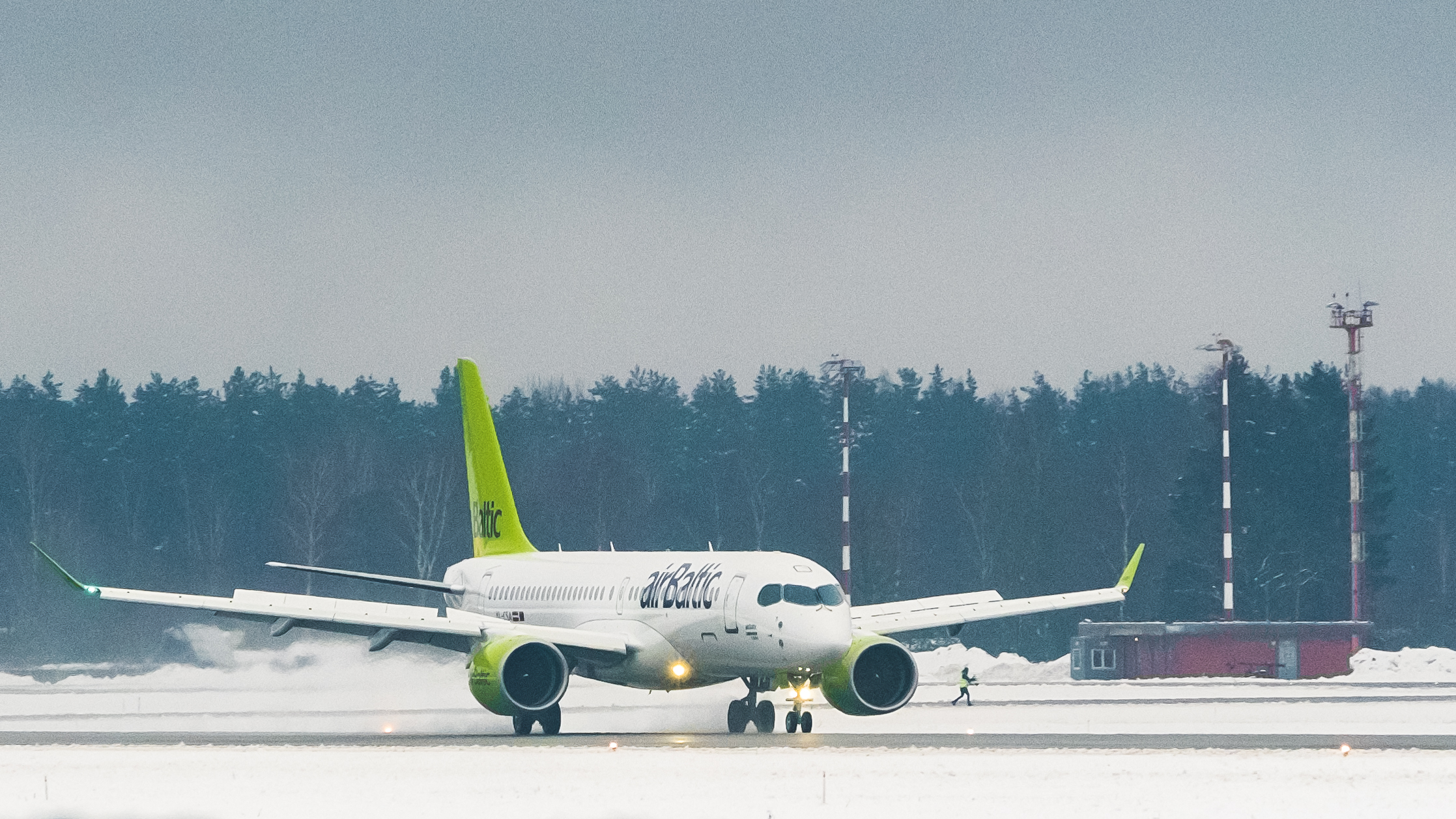
airBaltic was the CS300 launch operator in December 2016.

The first CS300 was delivered to second CSeries operator AirBaltic on 28 November, and began revenue service on 14 December with a flight from Riga to Amsterdam in a two-class, 145-seat configuration. The type launch operator lauded lower noise levels for passengers and more space for luggage than its Boeing 737-300s.

Upon introduction, both variants were performing above their original specifications, with airBaltic reporting that the CS300 range was 2% better, as were its per seat and per trip cost, and burned over 1% less fuel at 2,600 L/h. On long missions, the CS100 was up to 1% more fuel efficient than the brochure and the CS300 up to 3%. Therefore, Bombardier would update its performance specifications later in 2017. The CS300 burned 20% less fuel than the Airbus A319ceo, 21% less than the Boeing 737 Classic while the CS100 18 to 27% less per seat than the Avro RJ100. Furthermore, the CS300 was designed to be 6 t (13,000 lb) lighter than the Airbus A319neo and nearly 8 t (18,000 lb) lighter than the Boeing 737 MAX 7, giving it an operating cost advantage of up to 12%.

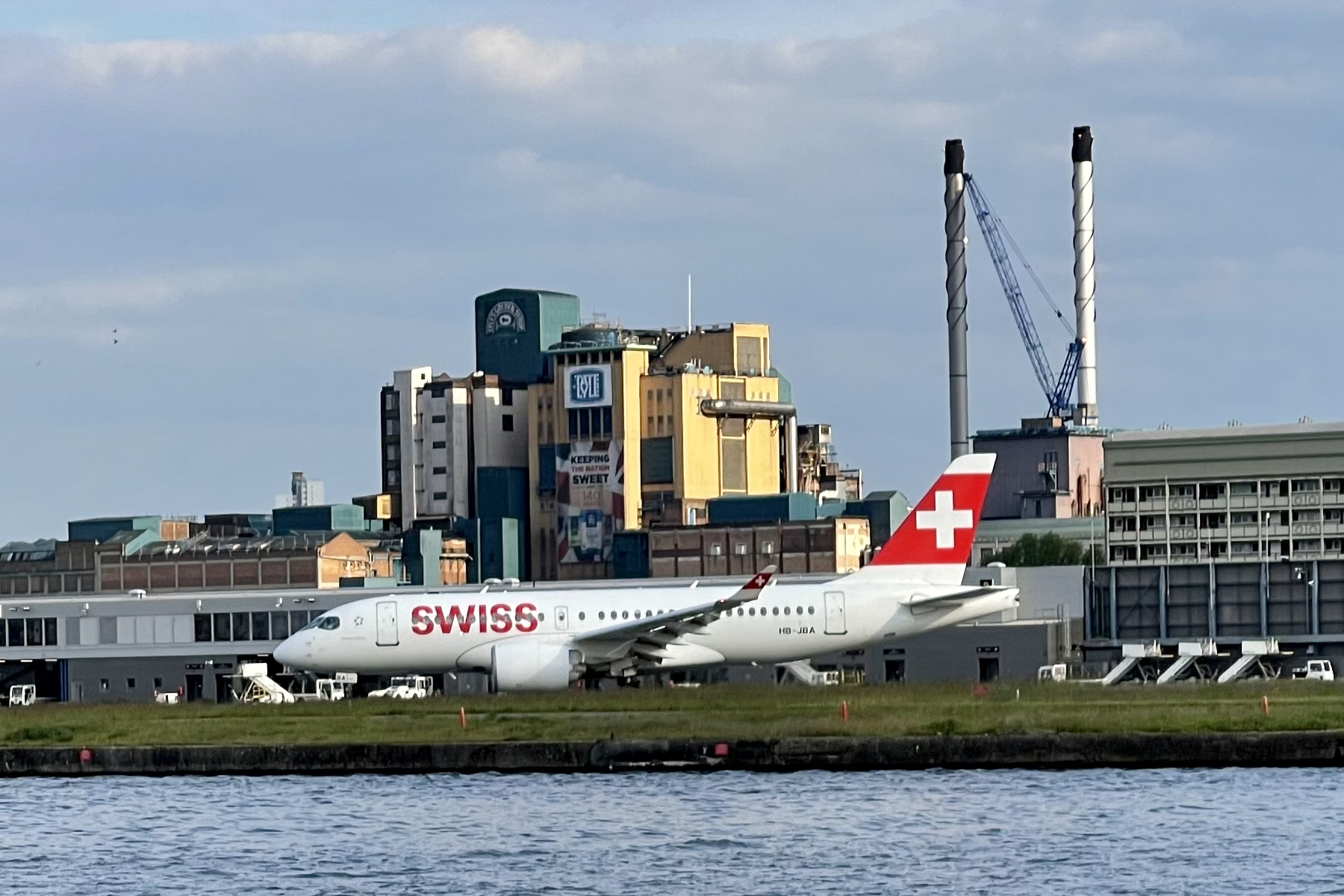
Following steep approach certification, Swiss operated its first revenue flight to London City Airport on 8 August 2017.

After 28,000 engine hours in 14 in-service aircraft with a dispatch reliability of 99.9%, Swiss replaced an engine pair in May 2017 after 2,400 hours, while airBaltic replaced another one in June. Swiss initially flew six sectors a day and by July up to nine a day with an average time of 1 hour 15 minutes. airBaltic's flight length averaged 3 hours, and the average fleet daily usage was 14 hours. On 8 August, following the steep approach certification by EASA, Swiss operated its first revenue flight from Zurich to London City, replacing the Avro RJ. As of September, the CSeries fleet had undergone 20 A Checks with no significant maintenance issues, and over 1.5 million passengers had 16,000 revenue flights in the 18 aircraft in service, making up to 100 revenue flights per day on 100 routes: most used were up to 17 hours per day and up to ten legs per day. Thirty-five minute turnarounds allowed 11 legs per day. On 22 December, after months of engine delivery delays, Korean Air became the third and latest operator of CSeries after receiving its first CS300, and completed its first revenue flight from Seoul to Ulsan on 20 January 2018.

=== A220 rebranding ===
The aircraft was rebranded A220 as a family name (formerly CSeries) with A220-100/300 (formerly CS100/CS300) as variant name on 10 July 2018, following the Airbus partnership ten days earlier. Financial issues at Bombardier due to the CSeries programme and production delays, stiff competition, and ultimately a dumping petition by Boeing, paved the way for the partnership.

==== Poor financial situation ====
A feasibility study prior to the programme launch estimated development costs of $2.1 billion for the CSeries in May 2005, shared equally by Bombardier, suppliers and partner governments. In November 2009, when the first CSeries wing was assembled for prototype manufacture, development costs rose to approximately $3.5 billion. Programme delays during the test preparation and flight test phase also resulted in order cancellations, including from a Swedish lessor. In August 2014, Bombardier changed the programme's management and slashed its workforce.

In 2015, in exchange for help in the final development stages of the "overdue and over-budget" aircraft, Bombardier offered to sell a controlling stake in the CSeries programme to Airbus but had to look for alternatives after Airbus confirmed in October that it had turned down the offer. Just days prior, the Government of Quebec reiterated its willingness to provide Bombardier with financial aid, if it were requested. On 29 October, Bombardier took a CA$3.2 billion write-down on the CSeries. The Trudeau government indicated that it would reply to Bombardier's request for $350 million in assistance after it took power in early November. On the same day, the Quebec government invested CA$1 billion in the company to save the struggling programme. In early November, a Scotiabank report indicated that the company and the programme would probably need a second bailout, and that even then the CSeries would probably not make money. When Transport Canada granted type certification for the CS100 in December 2015, CSeries' total development costs, including the aforementioned write-offs, were $5.4 billion. At the time, the CSeries had 250 firm orders and letters of intent, plus commitments for another 360, mostly for the CS300.

Bombardier reportedly requested a CA$1 billion aid package from the Canadian Government in April 2016. The Government then offered an aid package without divulging the amount or conditions imposed. In July, Bombardier set up the C Series Aircraft Limited Partnership (CSALP) together with Investissement Québec. The Government finally announced in February 2017 a package of CA$372.5 million in interest-free loans for the company, with the programme to receive one-third.

==== Delays in production ====
In 2016, Bombardier achieved its goal of delivering seven CSeries aircraft to both launch operators, Swiss and airBaltic. Production was then set to ramp to 30–35 aircraft deliveries in 2017 after PW1500G engine supply and start issues were resolved. However, the CSeries delivery goal for 2017 had to be revised to 20–22 aircraft only, due to persistent engine delivery delays, and finally, only 17 deliveries were completed in the year.

By the time the Airbus partnership came into effect on 1 July 2018, a total of 37 CSeries had been delivered, which was a very low production rate considering Bombardier had forecast at the programme launch, 315 annual deliveries from 2008 to 2027 for 100- to 150-seat airliners, up to half of that (157 units) would be delivered by the company itself. However, the average production rate of the six available models (B737-700, A318/A319, CS100/CS300 and E195) was fewer than 80 aircraft per year for the first 10.5 years.

==== Market stiff competition ====
The effect of stiff competition and production delays was apparent in early 2016. On 20 January, United Airlines ordered 40 Boeing 737-700s instead of the CSeries due to the type already being in full production, and commonality with United's existing 737 fleet of 310 aircraft. Boeing also reportedly gave United a massive 73% discount on the 737 deal, dropping the price to $22 million per unit, well below the CS300 market value at $36 million. David Tyerman, an analyst with Canaccord Genuity said to the Toronto Star: "This just shows how difficult it is for Bombardier to win orders these days.[...]. It also raises the question of how profitable the next C Series order they win will be for them."

The CSeries also competed with the smaller variants of the A320 family aircraft. The 2010 order for 40 CS300s and 40 options from Republic Airways Holdings – then owner of exclusive A319/320 operator Frontier Airlines – also pushed Airbus into the A320neo re-engine. Airbus opted to compete aggressively against the CSeries rather than ignoring it, as Boeing had done with Airbus. Airbus dropped the A320's price in head-to-head competition, successfully blocking Bombardier from several deals.

==== Boeing dumping petition ====
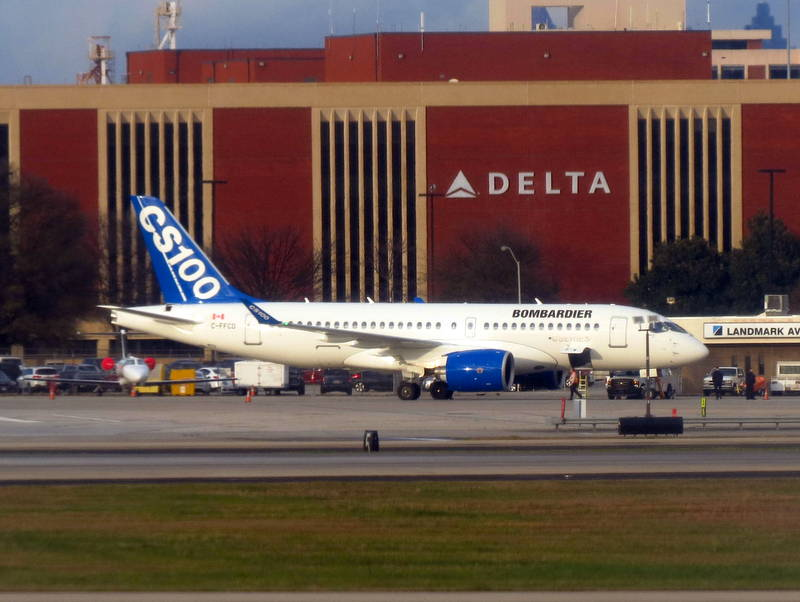
The CSeries CS100 demonstrated for Delta Air Lines in Atlanta

On 28 April 2016, Bombardier Aerospace recorded a firm order from Delta Air Lines for 75 CSeries CS100s plus 50 options. On 27 April 2017, The Boeing Company filed a petition for dumping them at $19.6m each, below their $33.2m production cost. On the same day, both Bombardier and the government of Canada rejected Boeing's claim, vowing to mount a "vigorous defence".

On 9 June 2017, the US International Trade Commission (USITC) found that the US industry could be threatened and should be protected. On 26 September, after lobbying by Boeing, the US Department of Commerce (DoC) alleged subsidies of 220% and intended to collect deposits accordingly, plus a preliminary 80% anti-dumping duty, resulting in a duty of 300%. The DoC announced its final ruling, a total duty of 292%, on 20 December, hailing it as an affirmation of the "America First" policy. In October, with financial issues already mounting, Bombardier was indirectly forced by the US government tariffs to relinquish 50.01% of its stake in the CSeries program to Airbus for a symbolic CAD$1, and would produce CSeries aircraft in the United States.

On 10 January 2018, Canada formally filed a complaint at the World Trade Organization (WTO) against the United States over the affair. On 26 January, the four USITC commissioners unanimously reversed their earlier claims, finding that US industry is no longer threatened and no duty orders will be issued, overturning the imposed duties. The Commission public report was made available by February 2018. On March 22, Boeing declined to appeal the ruling.

==== Airbus programme acquisition ====
Bombardier and Airbus announced on 16 October 2017 that Airbus would acquire a 50.01% majority stake in the CSALP partnership, with Bombardier keeping 31% and Investissement Québec 19%. Airbus paid no money, incurred no debt and assumed no liability for its share in the programme, but its supply chain expertise should save production costs, and a second assembly line would be built at its production facility, Airbus Mobile, in Mobile, Alabama. While assembling the aircraft in U.S. could circumvent the 292% duties proposed in the Boeing dumping petition, Airbus CEO Tom Enders and Bombardier CEO Alain Bellemare assured that this factor did not drive the partnership. However, negotiations began in August 2017 after the filing in April and the decision in June to proceed, and Boeing was therefore suspicious. Airbus CCO John Leahy considered that Boeing indirectly forced the CSeries programme into Airbus hands by pressing the U.S. administration for massive tariffs on the aircraft. Bombardier CEO predicted that the partnership would significantly accelerate sales as it would bring certainty to the CSeries programme through Airbus's global scale. AirInsight estimated that Airbus's corporate strength would increase the CSeries share of the 100- to 150-seat aircraft market over 20 years, from 40% of 5,636 aircraft (2,254 sales) to 55–60%, around 3,010 aircraft. Airbus would retain Bombardier as a strategic partner beyond the period required in the clauses, allowing it to acquire Investissement Québec's stake no earlier than 2023 and Bombardier's stake no earlier than 2025, but with main production remaining in Mirabel, Québec until at least 2041. The partnership was subject to regulatory approvals, and during competition investigation, Airbus and Bombardier were to operate separately and clean teams planned the integration with privileged access to competitively sensitive data but separated from their management.

Embraer assured at the Dubai Airshow in November 2017 that its base country Brazil would sue Canada for its subsidies to Bombardier through the World Trade Organization, because the competitor viewed CSeries as a heavy, expensive, and long, thin-haul aircraft outperforming the range of its own E-Jet E2, a close rival for market share. Previously, in October 2017, Boeing was reportedly concerned over its ability to match fleet package deals enabled by the partnership. Then, in December 2017, The Wall Street Journal reported Boeing was planning to offer Embraer more than the company's $3.7 billion market value to set up a joint venture, in what aviation industry analysts said was a reaction to the partnership. The Boeing–Embraer joint venture was announced in February 2019, but before the antitrust investigations were completed, the deal was unilaterally terminated by Boeing in April 2020 due to impact of the 2019–20 coronavirus pandemic on aviation.

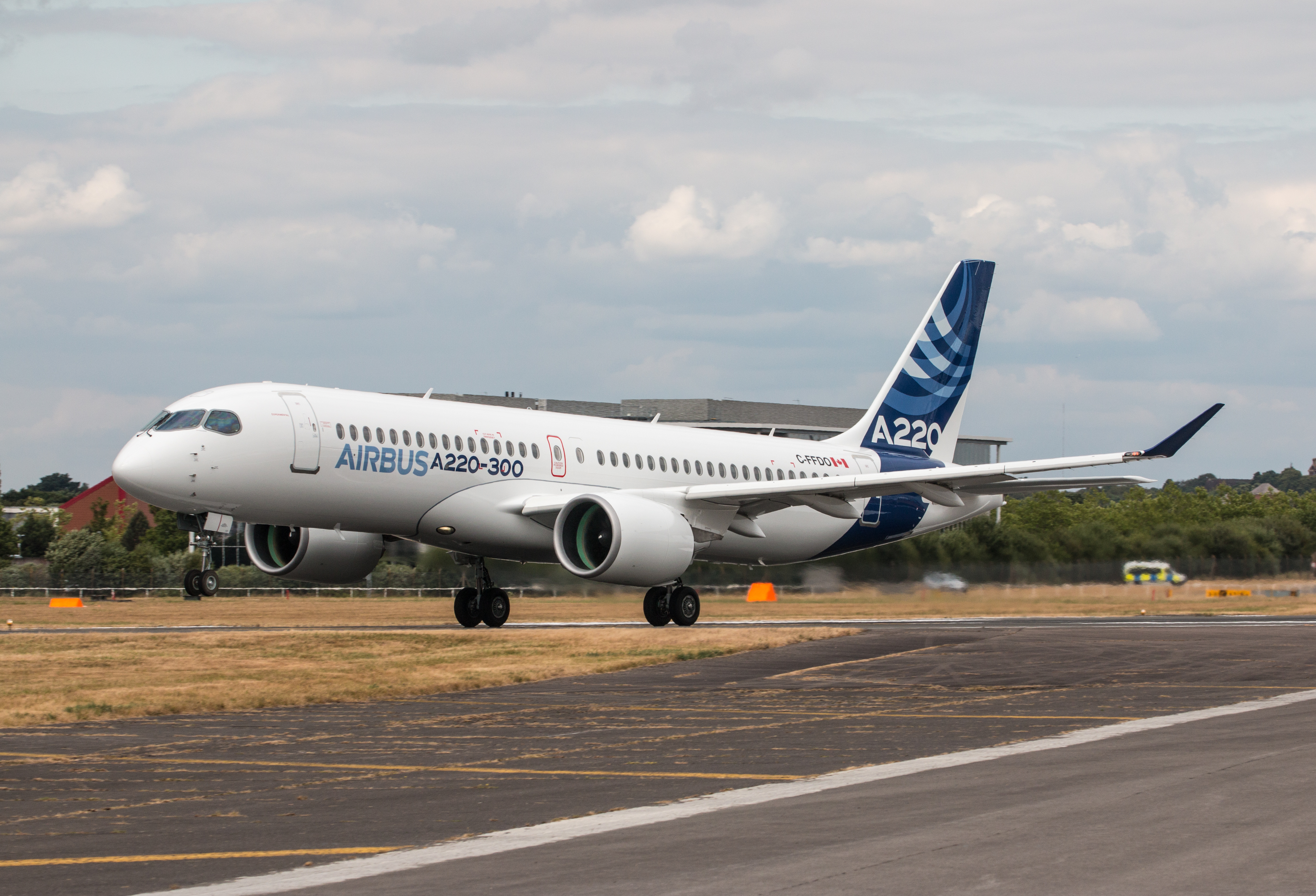
The A220-300 with the Airbus livery after its July 2018 takeover

The antitrust investigation was due to be completed ahead of Farnborough Airshow 2018 to allow for a marketing boost, and it was planned to rebrand the CSeries as an Airbus model, with A200 suggested as a family name and A210/A230 for the CS100 and CS300. On 8 June, following regulatory approval, the partnership confirmed that Airbus would take a majority stake on 1 July. The head office, and leadership team would remain in Mirabel, while the programme team would be formed by leaders from both Airbus and Bombardier and headed by Philippe Balducchi, then Head of Performance Management at Airbus Commercial Aircraft. Bombardier would fund any required cash shortfalls up to US$610 million from the second half of 2018 to 2021. Ten days after programme control was transferred to Airbus, the aircraft was rebranded with A220 as the family name (formerly CSeries) and A220-100/300 for the former CS100/CS300 variants. Later, on 1 June 2019, the CSALP joint venture was renamed Airbus Canada Limited Partnership (ACLP) and adopted the Airbus logo as its sole visual identity. The A220 became the only Airbus commercial aircraft programme managed outside of Europe, making Canada Airbus's largest presence other than Europe.

==== Bombardier exit participation ====
After reassessing its participation in January 2020, Bombardier exited the A220 programme in February 2020, selling its share to Airbus for $591 million, when the programme's cost had reached US$7 billion. Airbus thus owned 75% of the programme; the remaining 25% of shares were held by Investissement Québec. Under the acquisition terms Airbus acquired Bombardier's option to buy out Investissement Québec's share from 2023, with a revised option date of 2026. Airbus also agreed to acquire A220 and A330 work package production capabilities from Bombardier in Saint-Laurent, to be taken through the Airbus subsidiary, Stelia Aerospace.

Airbus and the government of Quebec agreed in February 2022 to invest a further $1.2b in Airbus Canada, to support the acceleration of the A220 production rate to 14 A220s per month. Accordingly, Airbus would invest $900m into the aircraft programme and Investissement Québec $300m, allowing the partnership to continue until the programme becomes profitable in the middle of the decade. In addition, 2030 had been set as the new earliest date for Airbus to acquire the remaining shares, with Quebec hoping to definitively profit from the sale. Under the latest agreement in July 2024 the threshold for Airbus to buy out Québec's share will be further extended to 2035, securing that two-thirds of the jobs linked to the production of the A220 will remain in Quebec. Meanwhile, the A220 held a market share of over 55% in its category and PwC estimated the aircraft programme will have an economic impact in Canada of more than $40 billion over the next 20 years.

=== Production ===
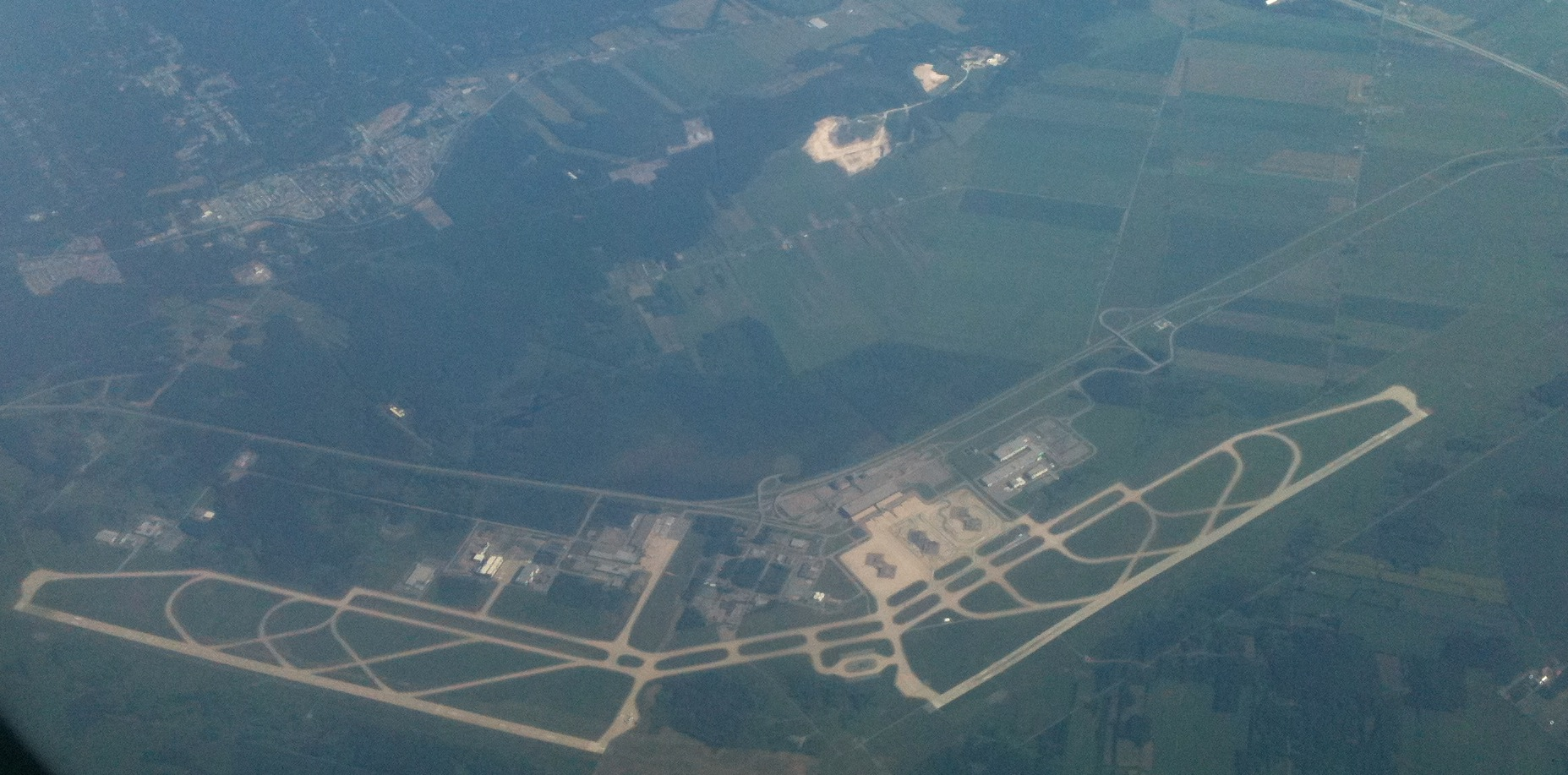
Main production facility and head office of Airbus Canada Limited Partnership (ACLP) at Montréal–Mirabel International Airport

The Airbus partnership in July 2018 decided to keep the primary final assembly line (FAL) in Mirabel, Quebec, with its 2,200 workforce. The secondary FAL in Mobile would start deliveries in 2020 with a monthly production rate of four, rising to six for a capacity of eight while the main Mirabel FAL could go to ten. Airbus CFO predicted a production potential of more than 100 A220 per year. The company targeted over 100 orders of A220 in 2018 and 3,000 over 20 years, half of the 100- to 150-seat market, and needed a supply chain cost reduction over 10%. It then sought to reduce costs from all suppliers, including Bombardier, wing builder Short Brothers and engine manufacturer Pratt & Whitney, and had reportedly pushed its suppliers to lower their prices by 20% for more volume, or to switch them, towards 150 yearly deliveries.

As of January 2019, the A220 suppliers were Liebherr for the landing gear, air management system and pneumatics; UTC Aerospace for the electrical system and lighting; Parker for the fuel, hydraulics and fly by wire systems, Goodrich for the engine nacelle; Meggitt for the wheels and brakes; Michelin for the tires; Spirit for the pylons; Honeywell for the auxiliary power unit; and PPG supplies the windows. Supplier costs could be cut by 30–40% through Airbus's market power, as a 10% procurement costs decrease would add six gross margin points to the programme. Airbus waited to win several new orders before increasing pressure on suppliers and catching their attention in 2019 with the sale of 135 A220s to U.S. airlines, including a follow-up order from Delta. The market share was split between 80% A220-300 and 20% A220-100. Delivery rates continued to climb with the new brand, reaching a total output of 33 in 2018, and then rising to 48 A220 in 2019.

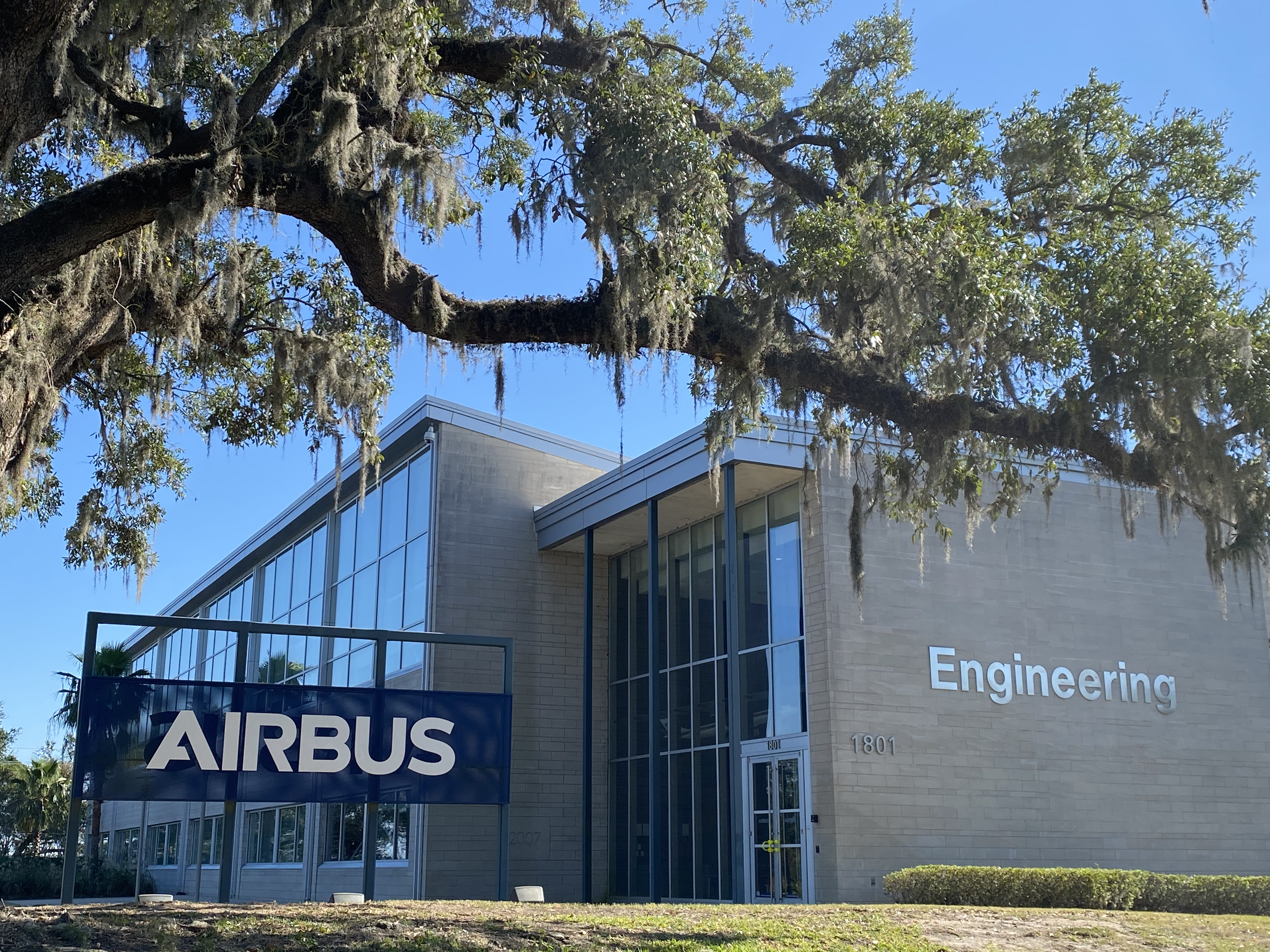
The second production facility, Airbus Mobile, in Mobile, Alabama started deliveries in 2020.

The groundbreaking ceremony for the $300 million final assembly line (FAL) at the Airbus Mobile plant in Mobile, Alabama was held on 16 January 2019; on this occasion Airbus confirmed its confidence that there is enough demand to justify two assembly sites and that the airliner can be profitable. On 5 August 2019, production started at the Mobile facility, which was not due to be finished until 2020; work started early to ensure that the first delivery schedule could be met.

The removal of Bombardier's financial constraints in February 2020 gave Airbus greater latitude for further investment in the programme, which will be needed to ramp up production rates, though this will push back the break-even point of the programme to the mid-2020s. On 2 June 2020, the first A220 produced in Alabama completed its first flight. By that date, production of the first aircraft for JetBlue Airways had also started. The first US-assembled A220 aircraft, an A220-300, was delivered to Delta on 22 October 2020.

In January 2021, as Airbus reviewed its production rates following a shift in demand away from wide-bodies affected by the COVID-19 pandemic, the A220 was expected to reach a production rate of five aircraft per month by the end of the first quarter as previously foreseen. In May 2021, Airbus targeted a production rate of six per month from early 2022, and intends to reach 14 (ten in Quebec and four in Alabama) per month by the middle of the decade to be profitable.

On 10 January 2022, Airbus introduced a "sub-assembly line" or the A220 pre-FAL, a U-shaped pre-assembly line with four stations used for preparatory work and seven for the actual equipping, in order to install systems earlier, stabilising the production process. The equipped fuselage sections are then moved to the FAL in Mirabel or in Mobile at a rate of six per month as of November 2022. These investments had accelerated A220 production and confirmed that the programme is on track to reach its target rate of 14 aircraft per month by mid-decade. After 1,600 new hires over the last two years, an increase of 75%, a total of 3,500 employees were working on the A220 programme in Quebec as of July 2024. The 100th US-assembled A220 aircraft, an A220-300, was delivered to Breeze Airways on 23 July 2025. In August 2026, a 6,221 m^{2} (66,960 sq ft) expansion of the A220 wing manufacturing facility in Belfast was announced; it is scheduled for completion in the first half of 2028, with the aim of increasing the A220 production rate to 13 aircraft per month.

=== Further development ===
==== Performance improvements ====
After beating performance promises by 3%, performance improvement packages shaving operating costs were explored prior to the Airbus partnership; these could include putting doors on the exposed main wheels, reducing drag but adding weight and complexity, and adding two to three more seats by moving the aft lavatory, without reducing the seat pitch. On 21 May 2019, Airbus announced a 2,268 kg (5,000 lb) MTOW increase from the second half of 2020, from 60.8 to 63.1 t (134,000 to 139,000 lb) for the A220-100 and 67.6 to 69.9 t (149,000 to 154,000 lb) for the A220-300, expanding the range by 450 nmi (830 km; 520 mi) to: 3,400 nmi (6,300 km; 3,900 mi) for the A220-100 and 3,350 nmi (6,200 km; 3,860 mi) for the A220-300. With the Airbus ruleset (90 kg (200 lb) passengers with bags, 3% enroute reserve, 200 nmi (370 km; 230 mi) alternate and 30 minutes hold), Leeham News posits a 2-class 108-seat A220-100 could reach 3,800 nmi (7,000 km; 4,400 mi) and a 2-class 130-seat A220-300 would achieve a range of 3,500 nmi (6,500 km; 4,000 mi) while being limited by its fuel capacity. With a denser economy seating at a 30-inch pitch for economy class instead of 32, a 2-class 116-seat A220-100 would still reach 3,700 nmi (6,900 km; 4,300 mi) and a 2-class 141-seat A220-300 would get 3,350 nmi (6,200 km; 3,860 mi).

In February 2020, Airbus announced an increase in payload capacity, achieved through a 1.8 t (4,000 lb) increase in the maximum zero-fuel weight and maximum landing weight of both the -100 and the -300, to be introduced as an option from 2022. From 2021, the new established Breeze Airways was set to receive A220-300s equipped with extra fuel tanks for 4,000 nmi (7,400 km; 4,600 mi) of range, allowing transatlantic flights or long routes like Orlando–Curitiba, Brazil, more range than the A321LR with 70% lower trip costs than A330s.

In March 2021, Airbus offered a further 1 t (2,200 lb) increase to the MTOW of the A220-300, to 70.9 t (156,000 lb), available from mid-2021 and providing another 200 nmi (370 km; 230 mi) of additional range to 3,550 nmi (6,570 km; 4,090 mi). On long routes the payload will be increased by about 900 kg (2,000 lb).

At the Aircraft Interiors Expo in April 2025, Airbus launched the A220 Airspace cabin with Air Canada, which would receive its first A220 with this improved cabin in March 2026.

==== Business jet A220-100 (ACJ TwoTwenty) ====
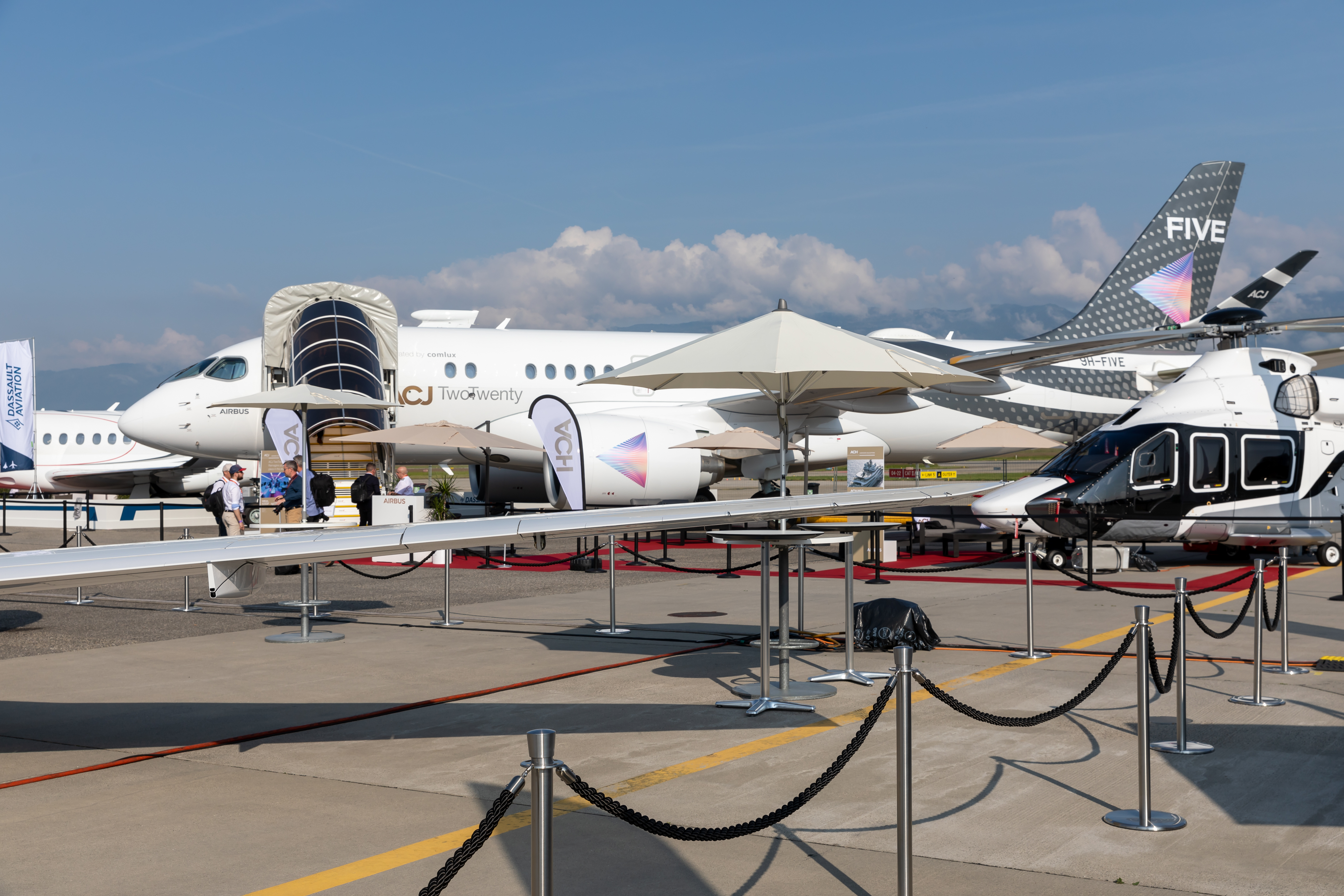
The first delivered ACJ TwoTwenty, during EBACE 2023 in Geneva

In October 2020, Airbus announced an Airbus Corporate Jets (ACJ) variant of the A220-100, to be known as the ACJ TwoTwenty, with a range of 5,650 nmi (10,460 km; 6,500 mi) and cabin space of 73 m^{2} (790 sq ft) for 18 passengers. On 17 May 2021, the first section of the ACJ TwoTwenty, the mid-fuselage section, had arrived at the A220 Final Assembly Line in Mirabel within the programme time frame and marked the start of the first Airbus corporate jet ever assembled in Canada. The business jet made its first flight on 14 December 2021, before delivery to Comlux to be outfitted with a VIP cabin in Indianapolis.

==== High-density A220-300 ====
In November 2022, Airbus began work on the highest passenger capacity versions, i.e. the 160-seat high-density A220-300, as well as 135-seat high-density A220-100. The high-density A220-300 incorporates an additional over-wing exit on each side of the fuselage to meet emergency evacuation requirements. Certification by Transport Canada is expected for 2028. AirAsia will be the launch customer, a possibility that had been suggested to the low-cost carrier by Bombardier in 2012, during the conception of the high-density CS300. Several European airlines have also expressed interest in this high density layout variant.

==== Stretched variant A220-500 (A221) ====
In May 2015, The Wall Street Journal reported that a stretched variant, tentatively dubbed the CS500, was being studied to compete with the 160- to 180-seat versions of the Boeing 737 and A320 airliners. The existing wing would be capable of supporting such a stretched version. After the Airbus partnership in 2018, the possible stretched variant was appropriately renamed the A220-500, which would allow Airbus to enlarge its A320-family replacement to better compete with the proposed Boeing New Midsize Airplane. In January 2019, Airbus hinted that a larger A220 variant could be developed, owing to ramped-up production and market demand for the current production models. Speculation about a stretched variant continued in November, with Air France mentioning an A220-500 during an investor briefing on its modernisation strategy.

In January 2022, Luxembourg flag carrier Luxair expressed interest in the A220-500 as the airline sought to simplify its operations and avoid operating a mixed fleet of narrow-body aircraft, similarly to airBaltic, which was also said to be looking forward to the stretched variant to complement its A220-300 fleet, while Breeze Airways eyed a longer-range variant. In the same month, following Allegiant Air's decision to walk away from the A220, due in part to the uncertainty surrounding the launch of the A220-500, Airbus CCO Christian Scherer said the stretched A220 variant was planned, although it was not an agenda item for a short-term decision. In July, Airbus solicited an engine proposal from Pratt & Whitney and CFM International as a possible second supplier for the newly stretched variant, as well as the existing variants. In September, Airbus CEO Guillaume Faury signalled to investors at Capital Markets Day that a stretched variant is necessary to increase the A220 family's share of the narrowbody market, adding, "but we don't want to be right too early". The A220-500 could be launched only once the production is geared up and the programme is profitable. If launched in 2025, it would enter service in 2028–2029 and Airbus could accept the risk for the A320neo backlog, more so as Boeing is not expected to launch a new narrowbody before 2030. Another issue is that with the same wing and uprated engines, the A220-500 would have a shorter range than the -300 variant, which essentially has the same range as the A320neo of 3,400 nmi, less than the Boeing 737 MAX 8 advertised by Boeing at 3,550 nmi. Increasing the range to at least the level of the A320neo would require extensive modification work, making development more expensive and reducing the aircraft's competitiveness.

In May 2023, Bloomberg reported that Airbus was reviewing the proposed stretched variant to compete more directly with the 737 MAX 8 and free up space for more A321 production. The concept, which Airbus now calls the A221, is gaining clarity as the company mulls an upgrade to the A220 wing design and accelerates design studies. These efforts aim to meet growing market demand and improve the aircraft's overall performance to become a more distinct model within the A220 Family. At the 2025 Paris Air Show, Benoît Schultz, CEO of Airbus Canada LP, said the company would have completed “very advanced studies” on the A221 by the end of the year, addressing the question of whether a new engine would be needed. Lars Wagner, the new CEO of Airbus Commercial Airplanes, told Reuters in January 2026 that he favored the new variant, which could accommodate 165 passengers in a single-class configuration. Within Airbus, the debate centered on whether to opt for a "simple" stretched version or one with a larger wing and more powerful engines. While a simple stretch trades range for capacity, it is likely the preferred option. After ordering 150 A220-300s in May, AirAsia has expressed interest in a stretched version, and could double its order if Airbus produces this A220-500 variant. At Airbus' 2026 Annual Press Conference, Airbus Chief Executive Officer Guillaume Faury stated that the company was hearing strong potential from the market for what was referred to as the "500". Faury said that the aircraft would make "plenty of sense" and that Airbus was "seriously considering" the programme, while emphasizing that no final decision had yet been made on its timing.

=== Further certification ===
In December 2018, the EASA approved Category IIIa/IIIb instrument approaches for autolanding the A220 with no decision height but runway visibility minimum requirements.

In January 2019, A220 powered with PW1500G gained ETOPS 180 approval from Transport Canada, allowing direct routes over water or remote regions. The A220 was the first commercial airliner to obtain domestic ETOPS certification from Transport Canada.

In July 2021, the EASA had officially approved an increase in the A220-300's maximum seating to 149 passengers, subject to a modification on an overwing exit slide. In September 2021, Airbus entered into talks with the Civil Aviation Administration of China over the certification of the A220 in order to enter the large Chinese aviation market, particularly in the western part of the country. At the 2023 Dubai Airshow, Airbus confirmed that it is seeking certification of the A220-300 for steep approach landings at London City Airport (LCY). In June 2025, Airbus was to begin certification work on the 160-seat high-density A220-300, having learned much from the A320neo, including "enhanced climb derate", which reduces engine usage during climb, increasing time on the wing, while maintaining maximum climb capability, and "dual motoring to start", which allows crews to start both engines more quickly at the gate.

== Design ==
The Airbus A220 family is a five-abreast single-aisle airliner developed specifically for the 100- to 150-seat market segment between regional airliners and mainline airliners, which includes two models, the 35 m (115 ft) long A220-100 and the larger, 38.71 m (127 ft) long A220-300. The design goal of the unique aircraft was to improve fuel efficiency, as well as operating costs, passenger comfort and range while reducing noise and emissions. These environmental benefits make the A220 family aircraft suitable for urban operations and noise-sensitive airports.

=== Airframe ===
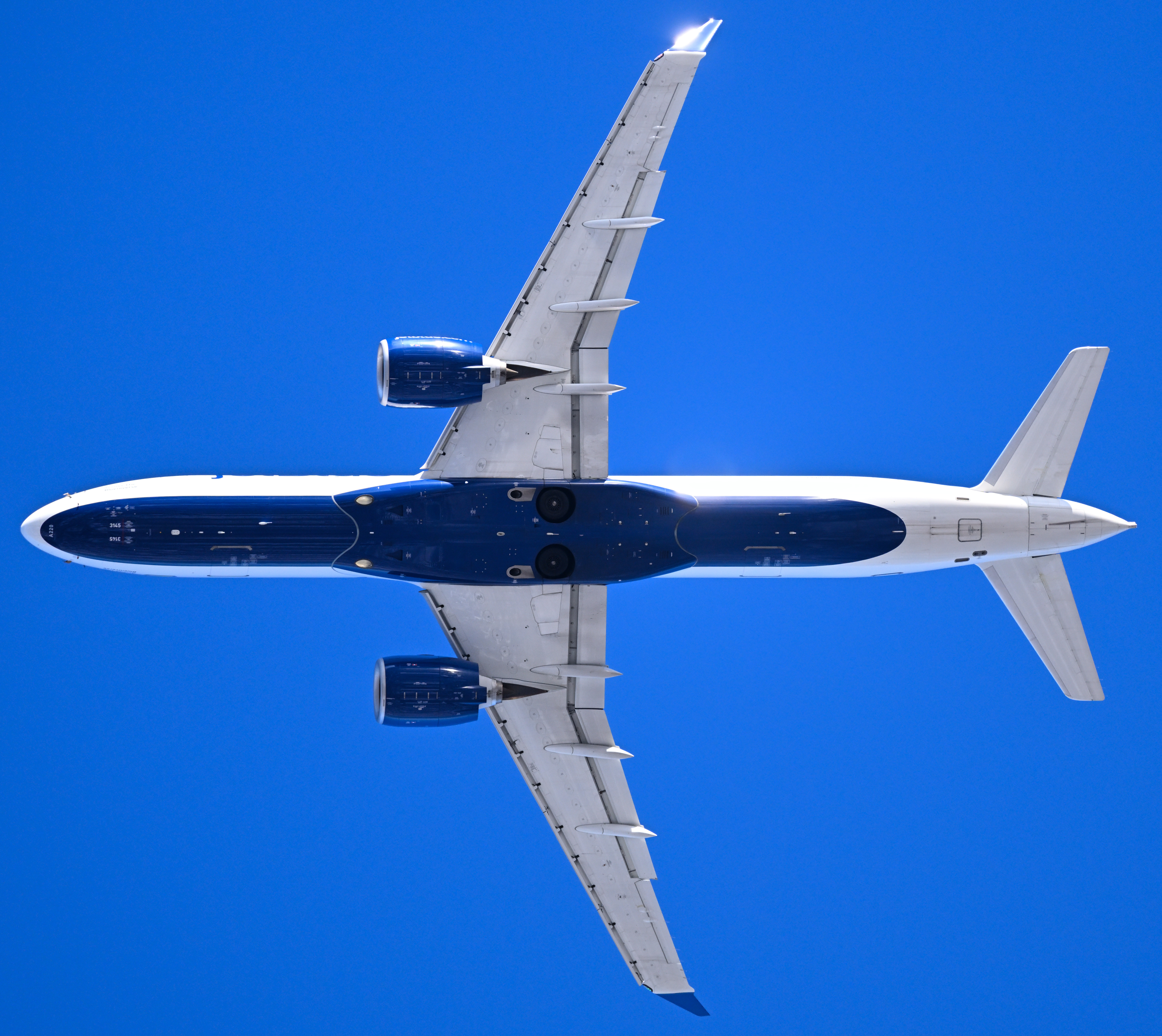
Planform view of an Airbus A220-300 showing exposed wheel wells and moderate wing sweep

Commonality between both variants of the A220 family is over 99%. To support higher loads, the A220-300's wing and centre wing box are structurally reinforced, as is the centre fuselage, which is 3.4 m (11 ft) longer than the -100 variant, and the main landing gear. Extensive use of aluminium–lithium in the fuselage, and carbon composite in wings, empennage, rear fuselage section, and engine nacelles reduces weight and increases corrosion resistance, resulting in better maintainability. The overall airframe consists of 70% advanced lightweight materials, comprising 46% composite materials and 24% aluminium–lithium. The aircraft features a low drag nose and tailcone design, minimum fuselage wetted area and optimised wing aerodynamics.

The nose landing gear is common for both variants, while the -300 main landing gear is slightly reinforced. The -100 has three pairs of disc brakes, the -300 one more.

=== Cabin ===
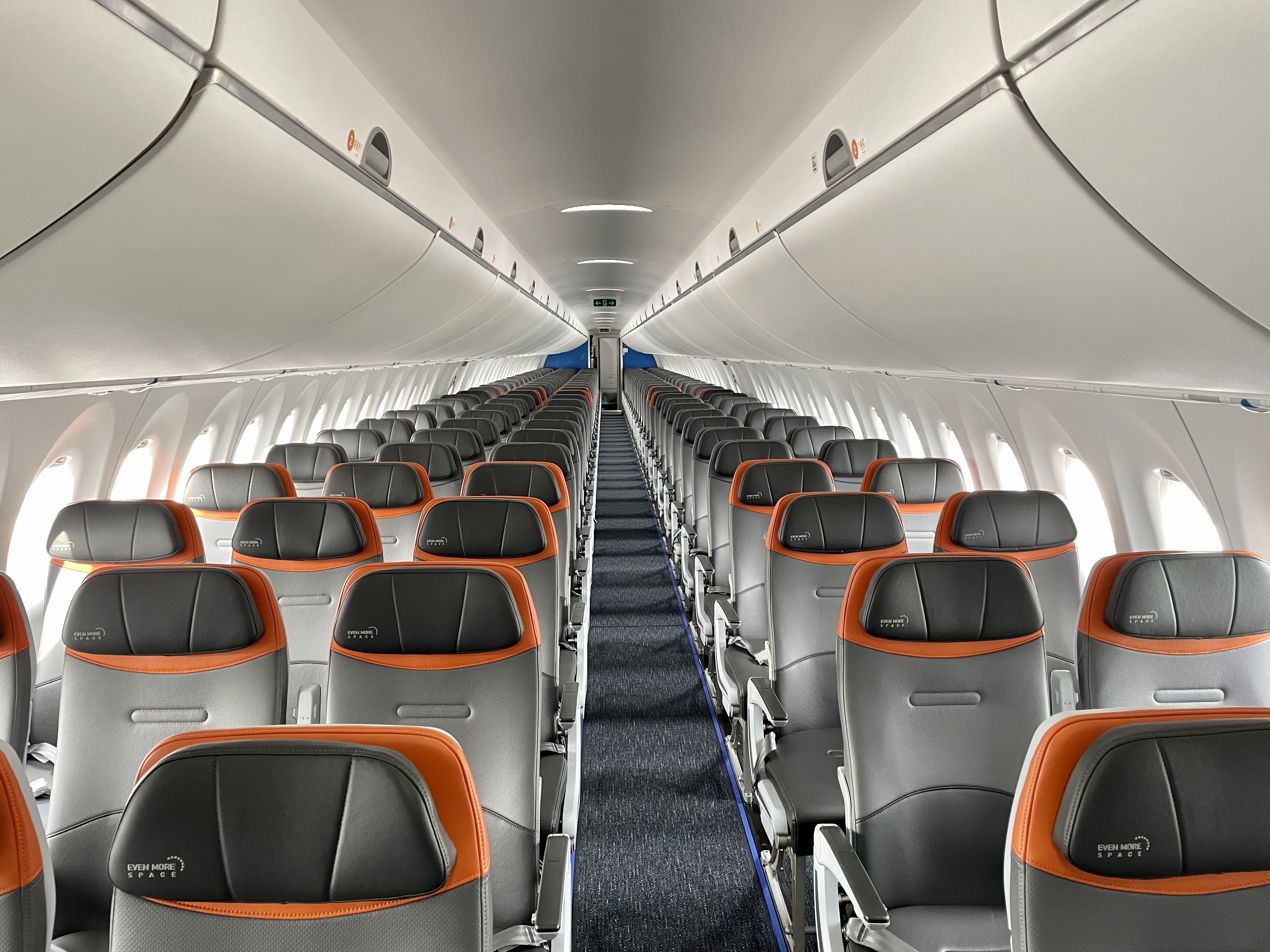
Five-abreast cabin and 18.5 in (47 cm) wide economy seats

The five-abreast cabin cross section has 47.0 cm (18.5 in) wide economy seats, 48.3 cm (19 in) wide middle seats, and a 50.8 cm (20 in) wide aisle for fast turnarounds of 20 minutes. The rotating overhead bins offer 70 L (2.5 cu ft) of storage per passenger to allow one carry-on bag per passenger. Each row has power cables, so all seats are equipped with charging capabilities. Lavatories have improved accessibility for passengers with reduced mobility. Two flex zones allow modular cabin elements such as stowage areas and partitions to be customised. The cabin is lighted naturally through 28 cm × 41 cm (11 in × 16 in) windows (larger than those on the A320) at every seat row and artificially by customisable colour LEDs. The aircraft offers overhead video display, wireless content distribution and Ku band connectivity, and can be equipped with in-flight-entertainment. The onboard environment, entertainment offerings and mood lighting are controlled via an integrated cabin management system.

It has a 10 cm (4 in) higher ceiling as well as 20% larger luggage bins than other aircraft in its class. The seat is 2.5 cm (1.0 in) wider than the Airbus A320 and 5.0 cm (2.0 in) wider than the Boeing 737. The new A220 Airspace XL bins would offer up to 19 additional passenger bags on the A220-300 and accommodate longer and heavier payload items thanks to the four-frame design. The bins would also reduce maintenance and the effort for cabin crew to close the bin doors, resulting in an overall shorter turnaround time and about 140-kilogram (300 lb) lighter cabin structure. To complement the Airspace XL bins, an improved Passenger Service Unit (PSU) was developed in line with the Airspace design.

=== Cockpit ===
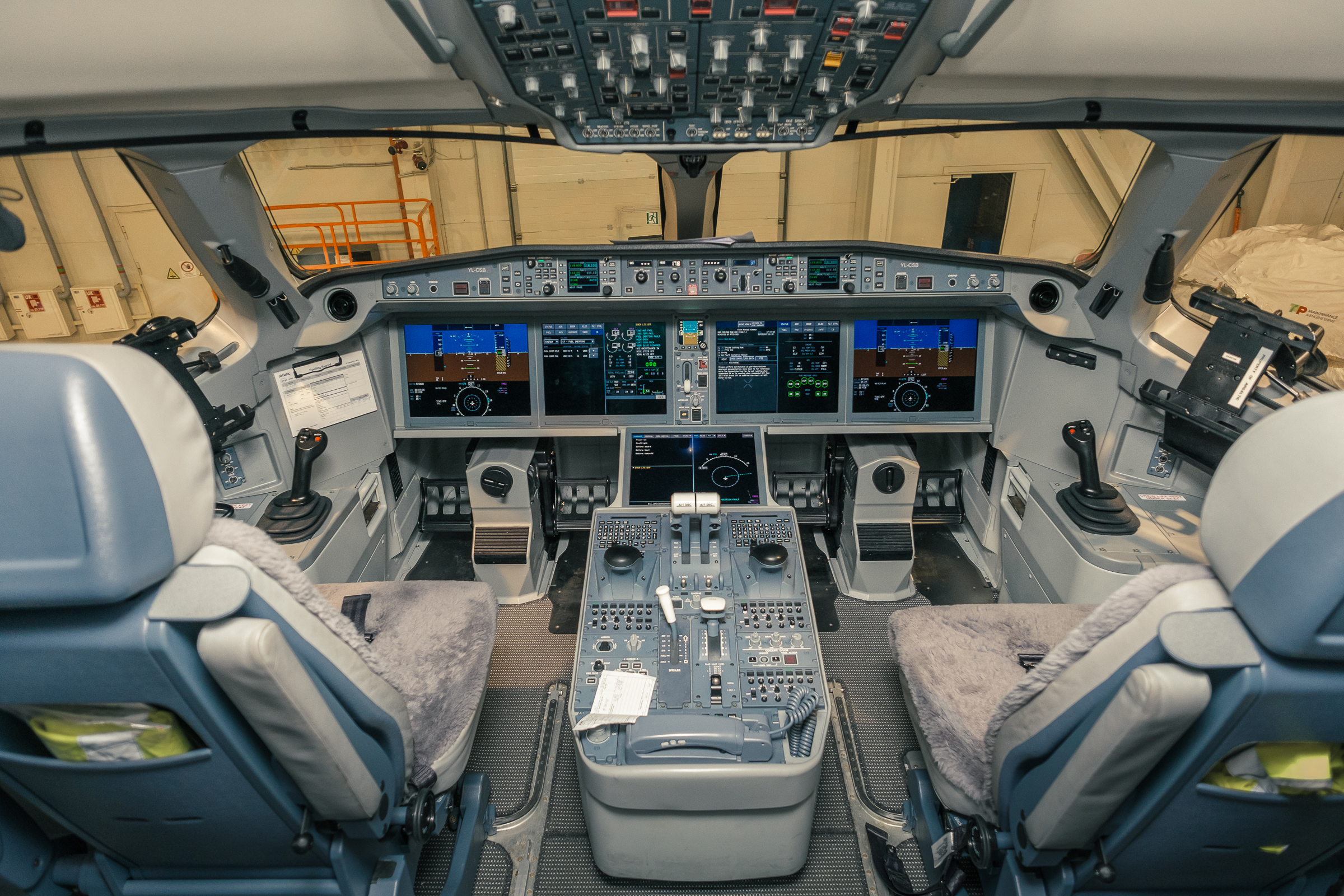
Cockpit with side-stick controller

The cockpit features the Rockwell Collins Pro Line Fusion avionics suite, which incorporates five 38 cm (15.1 in) displays along with comprehensive navigation, communications, surveillance, engine-indicating and crew-alerting system (EICAS), electronic checklist, aircraft maintenance systems, and can be equipped with head-up displays. Other elements of the avionics and other subsystems include Parker Hannifin's flight control, fuel and hydraulics systems; Liebherr Aerospace's air management system; and United Technologies Corporation's air data system, flap and slat actuation systems. The cockpit includes a dual flight management system, multi-scan weather radar, fly-by-wire flight controls with full envelope protection & speed stabilisation, Cat IIIa Autoland, and side-stick controllers. The cockpit layout is common to the -100 and the -300 variants, enabling pilots to fly either variant with the same type rating.

=== Engine ===
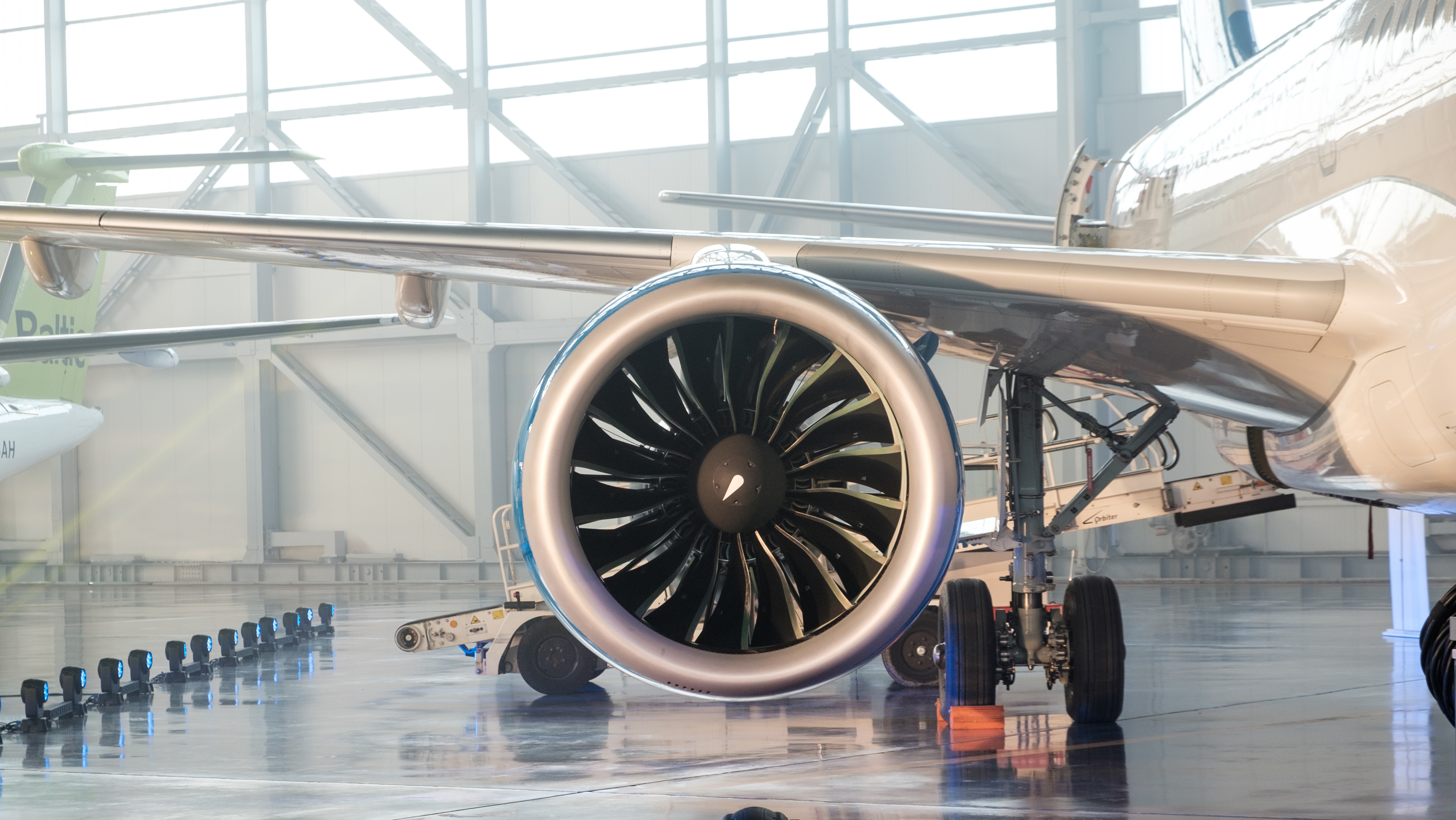
PW1500G geared turbofan mounted under the wing

The A220 is powered by two Pratt & Whitney PW1500G underwing turbofans. Its geared turbofan (GTF) architecture and advanced engine core improves efficiency and reduces the stage and parts count. The PW1500G has a 20 dB margin to Chapter IV noise limits, and high-efficiency components and advanced combustor technologies reduce CO_{2} and NOx emissions. It was certified in February 2013, the first variant in the PW1000G range. At that time, the PW1500G was the turbofan engine with the highest bypass ratio (BPR) of 12:1, only slightly lower than the 12.5:1 BPR of the later released PW1100G powering the A320neo family. Each engine can produce 84.5 to 104 kN (19,000 to 23,400 lb) of thrust flat rated at ISA +15 °C. The PW1500G was designed to reach 12% better fuel economy than previous generation engines.

=== Efficiency ===
The A220 manufacturer states that the structural technology, aerodynamic design, ultra-high bypass GTF engine, and state-of-the-art flight control and systems together can save fuel burn per seat, CO_{2} and NOx emissions, as well as provide a reduction in maintenance costs and operating cost per seat, plus a reduced noise footprint with a 18 EPNdB margin to chapter 4 noise limits. Around two thirds of the overall fuel efficiency are attributed to the GTF engines, and one third to lightweight structures, state-of-the-art aerodynamics and systems.

== Operational history ==
After successfully entering commercial service with positive feedback from customers in Europe and Asia, the A220's operations have been expanded worldwide to include the Americas, Africa, Australia and Oceania.

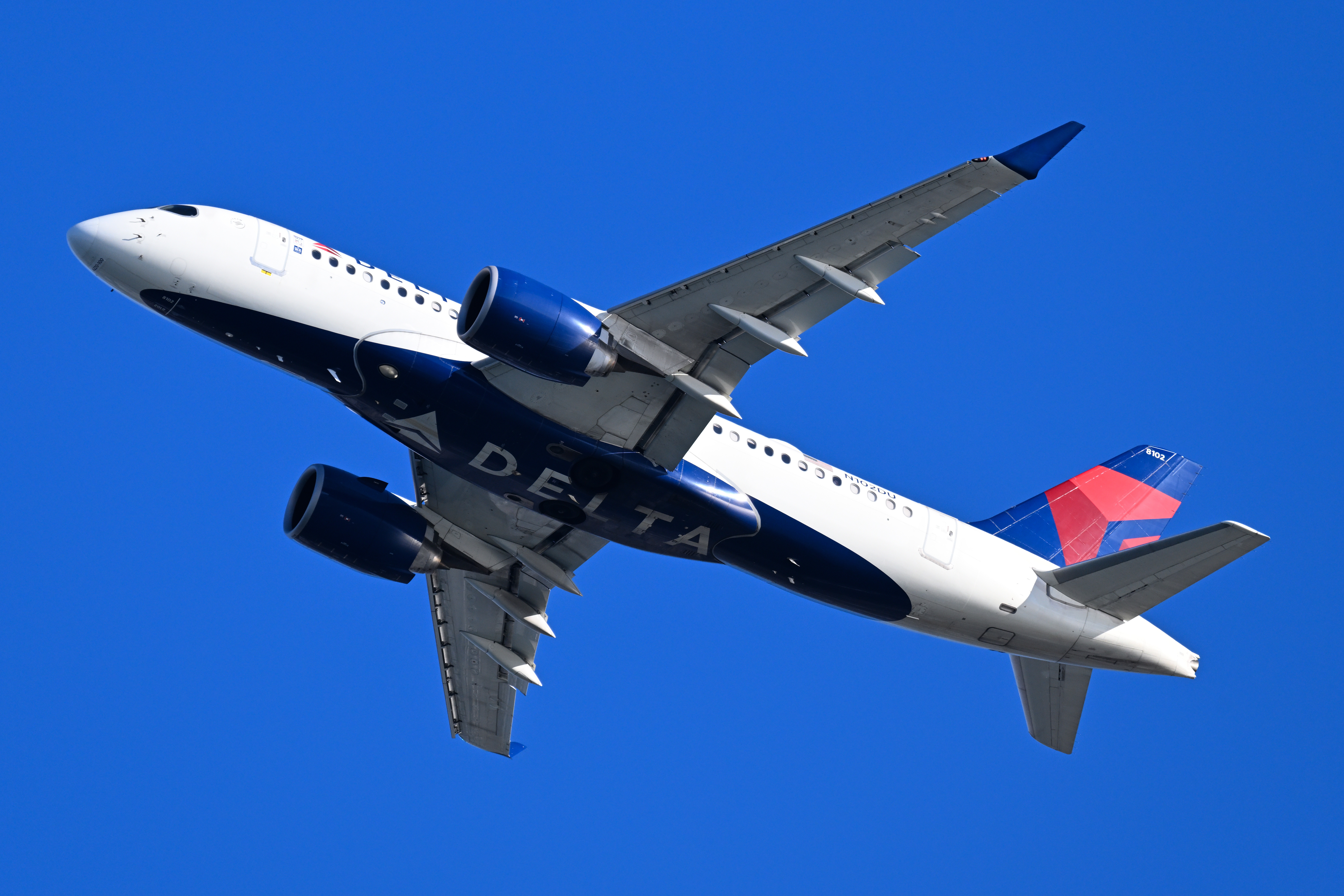
The first American operator, Delta, started its A220 revenue service on 7 February 2019.

2018

On 20 July 2018, the first aircraft with Airbus branding, an A220-300, was delivered to the type launch operator airBaltic, and in the same month, the airline launch customer of the type, Korean Air, received also its first rebranded A220-300. On 26 October, the first American operator Delta Air Lines received its first A220, an A220-100, of its order for 75, which was previously disputed by Boeing. Delta configured the A220-100 with 109 seats, including 12 first class, 15 in Delta Comfort+ and 82 in the main cabin, and on 7 February 2019, the airline operated its maiden A220-100 flight with service from New York–LaGuardia Airport to Dallas–Fort Worth. On 21 December 2018, Air Tanzania received its first A220, an A220-300, to be based in Dar es Salaam. The flag carrier became the first African operator and the fifth worldwide to operate the A220 family aircraft, which had already been flying in Europe, Asia and America.

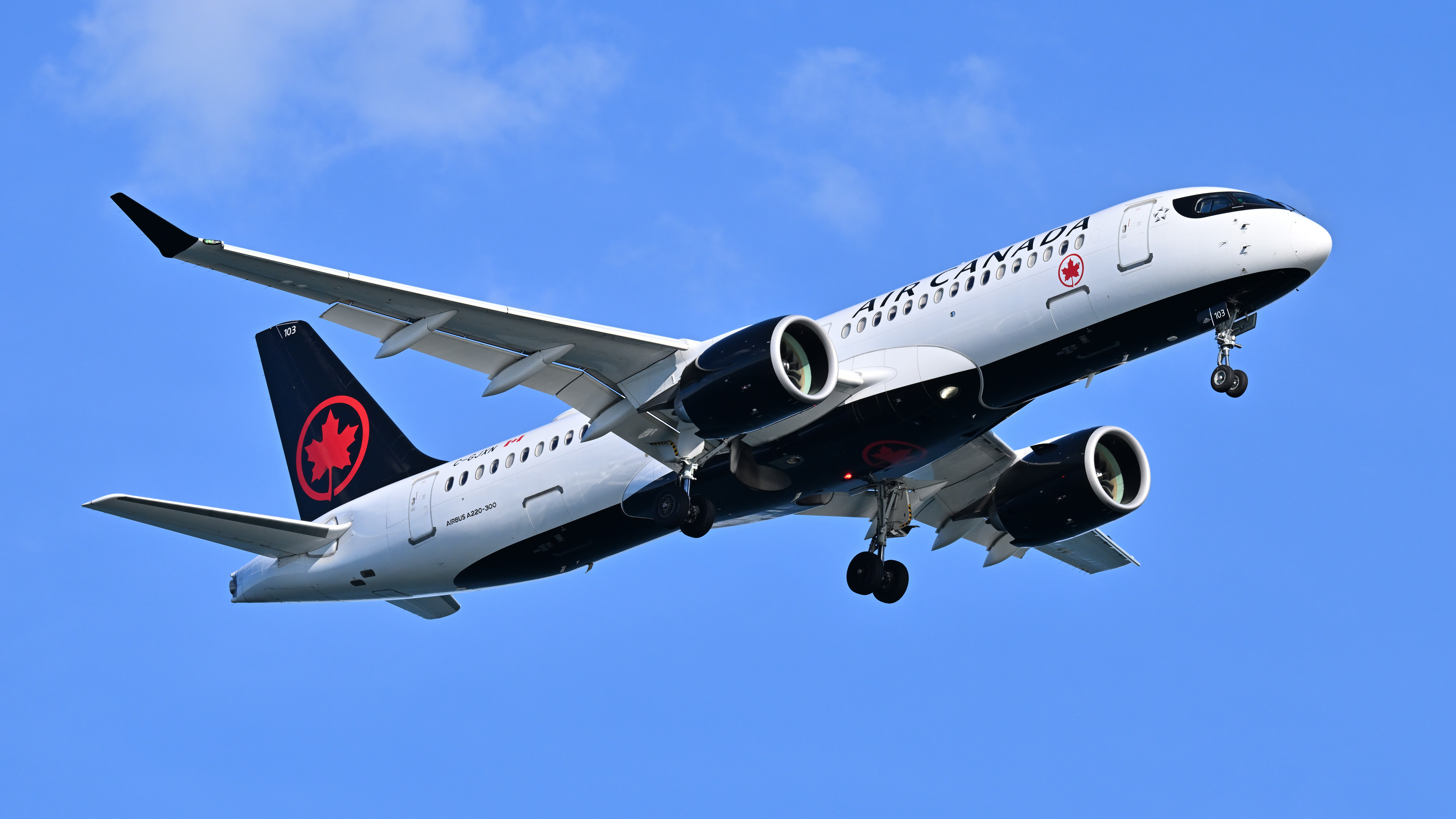
The second North American operator, Air Canada, began A220 flights on 16 January 2020

2019

As of April 2019, the global A220 fleet of 60 aircraft had completed more than 90,000 flights in 120,000 block hours on more than 170 routes to 130 destinations and carried 7 million passengers: most used were up to 18 hours and 13 legs per day. By July, the launch operator, Swiss Air Lines successfully completed C checks on its A220 fleet, performed by SAMCO Aircraft Maintenance in its MRO facilities at Maastricht Airport. On 6 September 2019, Egyptair received its first A220 of its order for 12, a -300 with 140 seats: 15 premium and 125 economy seats. Its final A220-300 was delivered on 5 October 2020.

On 29 November 2019, the 100th A220, an A220-300, was delivered to the type launch operator, airBaltic. At that time the airline operated the longest flight by an A220 – a 6.5-hour flight from Riga to Abu Dhabi. That year, airBaltic became the first airline capable of providing a full scope of maintenance for the A220-300. On 20 December 2019, Air Canada received its first A220-300 of its order for 45 aircraft and became the second North American operator of the A220. Canada's flag carrier began A220 flights on 16 January 2020 between Calgary and Montreal. The airline expected A220-300s to be 15% cheaper to operate per seat than the Embraer 190s they will replace.

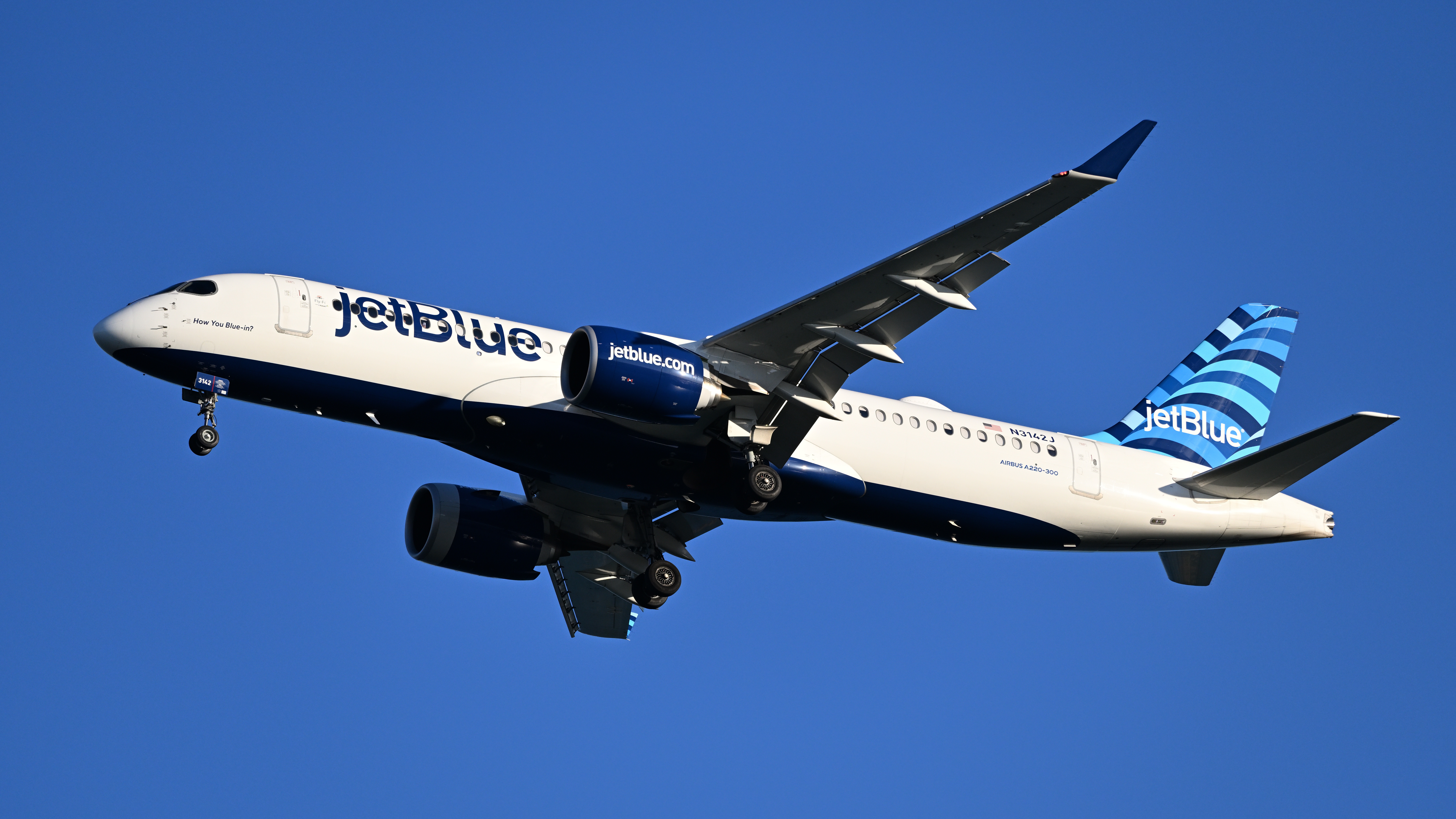
JetBlue became the second US operator of A220 in December 2020.

2020

During the height of the COVID-19 pandemic, the number of flights on many routes was reduced by more than 80% over the same period in 2019. The A220's features made it popular with airlines, as they preferred smaller aircraft with similar range and economic performance as larger ones, in order to keep the load factor high enough. Delta grounded their 62 A320s, for example, but continued to sell flights on their 31 A220-100 models and Swiss only operated 30% of their A320s but maintained flights on 45% of their 29 A220s. Between May and December 2020, airBaltic operated all its flights with its A220-300s to minimize complexity.

By November, the global A220 fleet of 135 aircraft had completed more than 295,000 flights over 440,000 block hours on more than 400 routes to 225 destinations with a daily utilisation of up to 18 hours and 13 legs per day. On 31 December, JetBlue took delivery of its first A220-300 from a total order of 70 aircraft. The second US operator of A220 family aircraft began its revenue flight from Boston Logan International Airport to Tampa International Airport and expected around 30% lower direct operating cost per seat than its E190 fleet to be replaced, which came from both fuel and non-fuel savings. JetBlue configured its A220-300 with 140 seats and an expanded width of 47 cm (18.6 in), including ViaSat-2 connectivity.

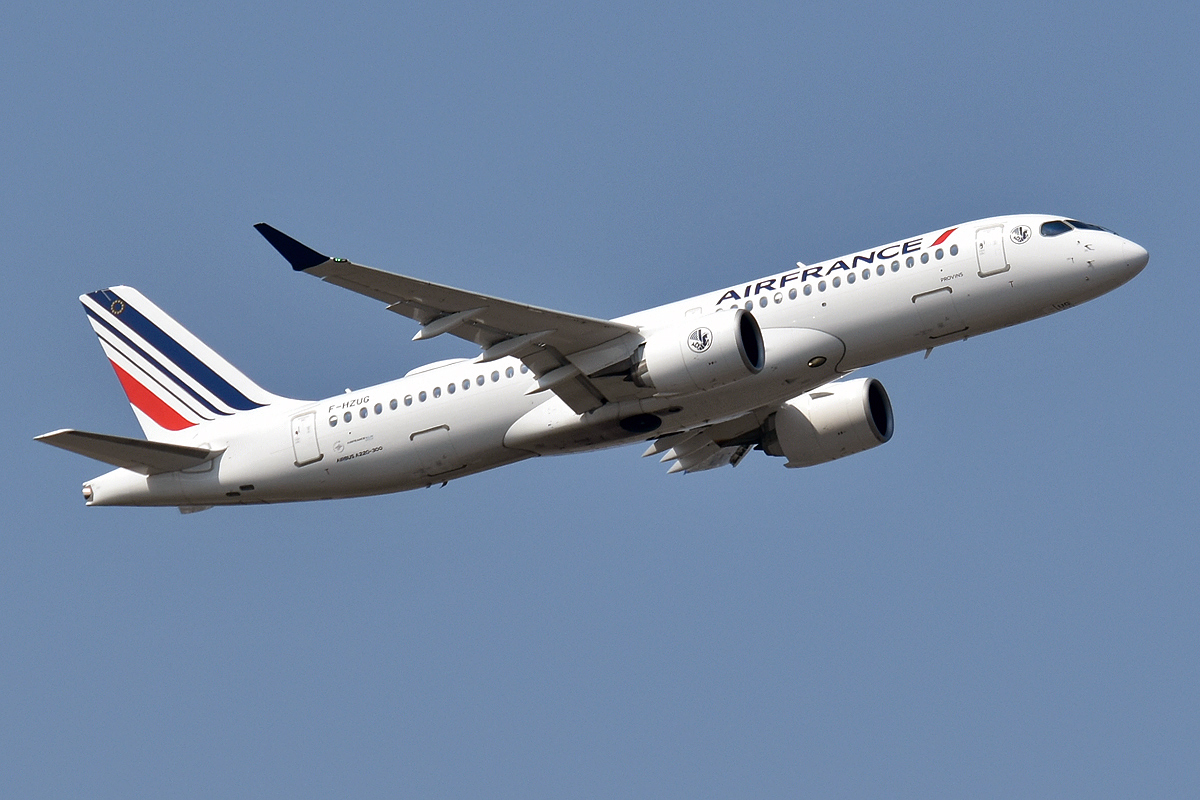
Air France, the largest customer in Europe, became an A220 operator in September 2021.

2021

By January 2021, airBaltic's A220 fleet had completed close to 60,000 flights over 141,000 block hours, carrying over 5.6 million passengers as it completed C checks on the first seven aircraft of its fleet. On 22 April 2021, Air Manas received its first A220-300 of planned three aircraft to be based in Bishkek, Kyrgyzstan and became the first operator in the CIS states to introduce the A220. On 26 May 2021, Swiss took delivery of its thirtieth and last A220 at Zurich Airport.

On 27 July 2021, Réunion Island-based Air Austral became the first French A220 operator after receiving its first A220-300 of three planned to replace its ATR 72-500 and Boeing 737-800 aircraft, to be operated to Mauritius, Mayotte, Seychelles, South Africa, Madagascar and India. On 29 September 2021, Air France, the largest A220 customer in Europe, received its first A220-300 from an order for 60 aircraft, to be operated on the airline's medium-haul network with a 148 passengers single-class cabin. From August 2020 to July 2021, the A220 average on-time performance (OTP) was 99%, led by Korean Air with 99.63%, giving the airline the "Airbus A220 Best Operational Excellence 2021" award on 4 October 2021, during IATA's Annual General Meeting. On 17 December 2021, Breeze Airways, took delivery of its first A220-300, which was ferried from Airbus Mobile to Tampa International Airport. On 29 December 2021, Air Senegal, the flag carrier of the Republic of Senegal. became the fourth A220 operator in Africa after receiving its first A220-300, which was delivered from Montreal via Paris to the carrier's home base in Dakar.

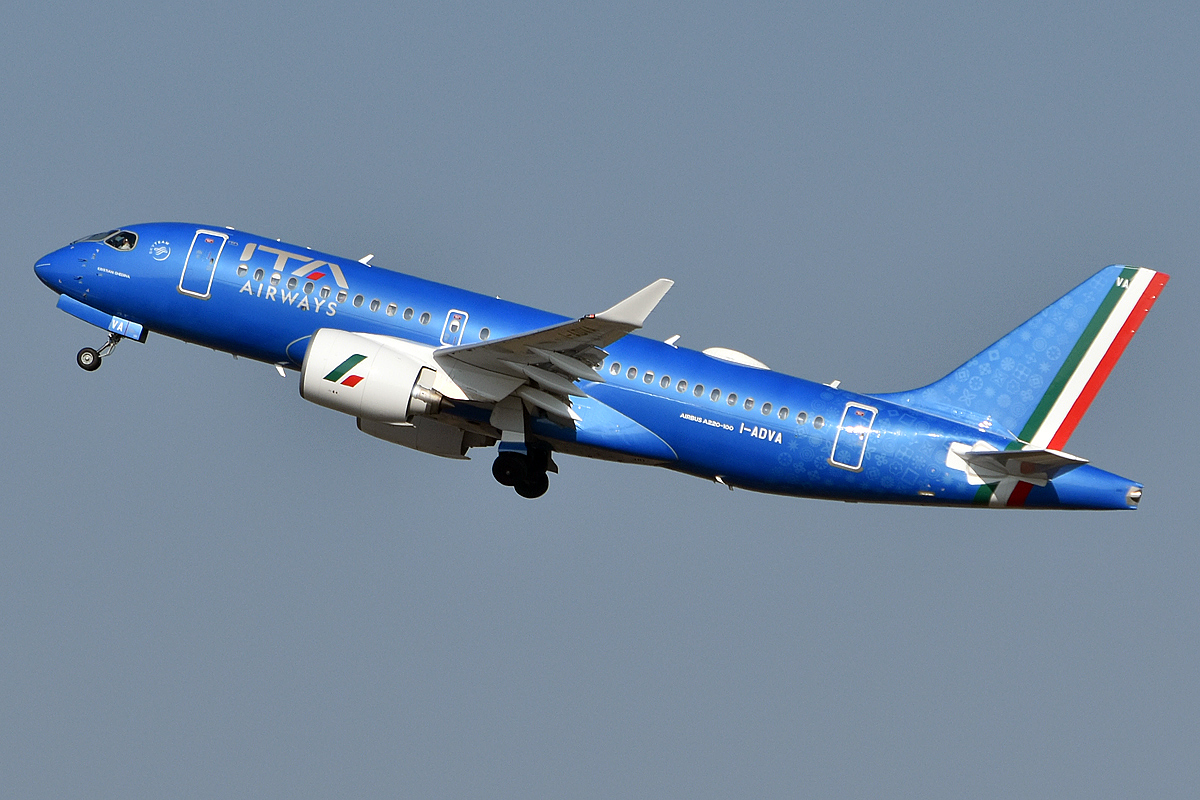
Italy's ITA Airways became an A220 operator in October 2022.

2022

By January 2022, the global A220 fleet of 193 aircraft had completed more than 440,000 flights over 675,000 block hours on more than 550 routes to 275 destinations with 99.0% operational reliability. On 7 January, Iraqi Airways, the national carrier of Iraq, took delivery of its first out of five A220-300 aircraft from the Mirabel site. The airline began the type's commercial operation ten months later on 8 November 2022, becoming the second after Egyptair to operate the A220 in the MENA region. On 6 May, Air Austral resumed its route between Réunion and Chennai that had been suspended at the height of the COVID-19 pandemic. At 2,870 nmi (3,300 mi; 5,320 km), the flight is the world's longest A220 route, a record previously held by airBaltic's Riga–Dubai flight of 2,684 nmi (3,089 mi; 4,971 km).

On 12 July, approximately six years after the type entered service, Airbus delivered the 220th A220 to JetBlue Airways, the type's largest customer at the time, where the global A220 fleet had carried 60 million passengers on over 700 routes ranging from 30-minute to 7-hour flights to 300 destinations. In October, a batch of A220-300s originally destined for Russian airline Azimuth were delivered to ITA Airways (Italia Trasporto Aereo), the new Italian flag carrier, instead by their lessor. On 16 October, ITA Airways entered its A220-300 into service on a flight from Rome to Genoa.

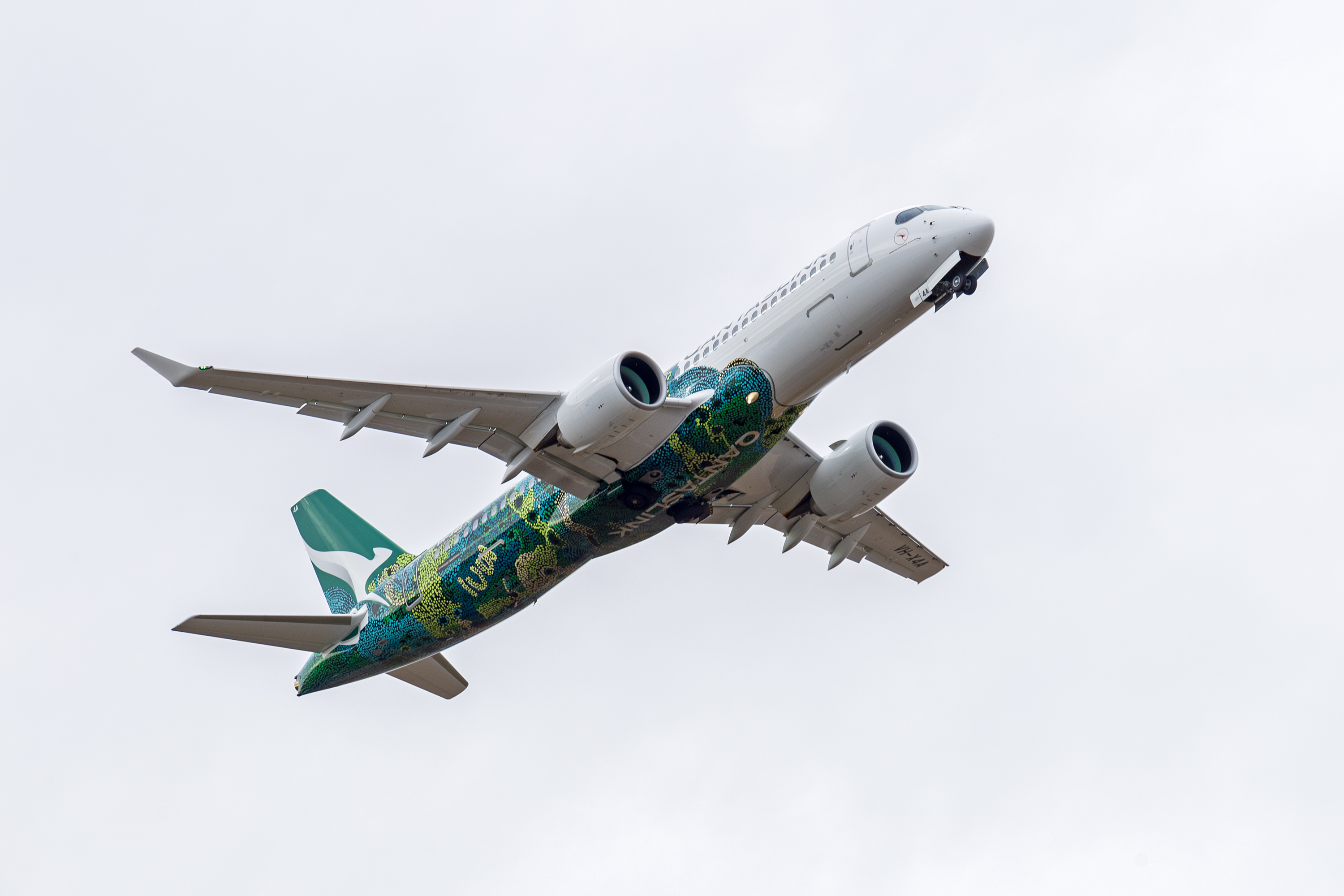
The first Australian operator, QantasLink, received its first A220 in Minyma Kutjara Tjukurpa art livery in December 2023.

2023

In early 2023, several operators: Iraqi Airways, airBaltic, Air Tanzania and Swiss Air Lines had to ground some of their A220s due to GTF engine problems amid aviation supply chain issues after the pandemic. According to Air Tanzania, the PW1524G-3 engines had to be removed for maintenance before 1,000 landings, when they were supposed to be removed after 5,260 landings. On 16 June, Bulgaria Air, the flag carrier of Bulgaria, took delivery of its first A220 from the Mirabel facility. The airline would lease a total of five A220-300s and two A220-100s from Air Lease Corporation (ALC) and fly the fleet across Europe on both regional and international routes. In July, five years after the A220 joined the Airbus aircraft family, the fleet of more than 260 A220s had flown over a billion kilometers on more than 1,100 routes ranging from 30 minutes to 8 hours, carrying more than 90 million passengers to over 375 destinations across the globe. On 21 July, Cyprus Airways welcomed its first two A220-300s leased from ALC. The islands' flag carrier nicknamed its new fleet member the Cyprus Airways Greenliner as the A220 is to reduce the company's emissions by around 40%, and put it into service on 9 August with a flight from Larnaca to Athens. On 28 November, Nigerian operator Ibom Air took delivery of its first new A220-300, one of ten on order. The airline had already gained experience with A220 operations, having temporarily leased a pair from EgyptAir in 2021. On 16 December QantasLink took delivery of its first A220-300 of 29 units on order, making it the 20th operator of the type, which would serve metropolitan and regional destinations across Australia. The full-service carrier put its A220 into service on 1 March 2024, operating from Melbourne to Canberra and Brisbane.

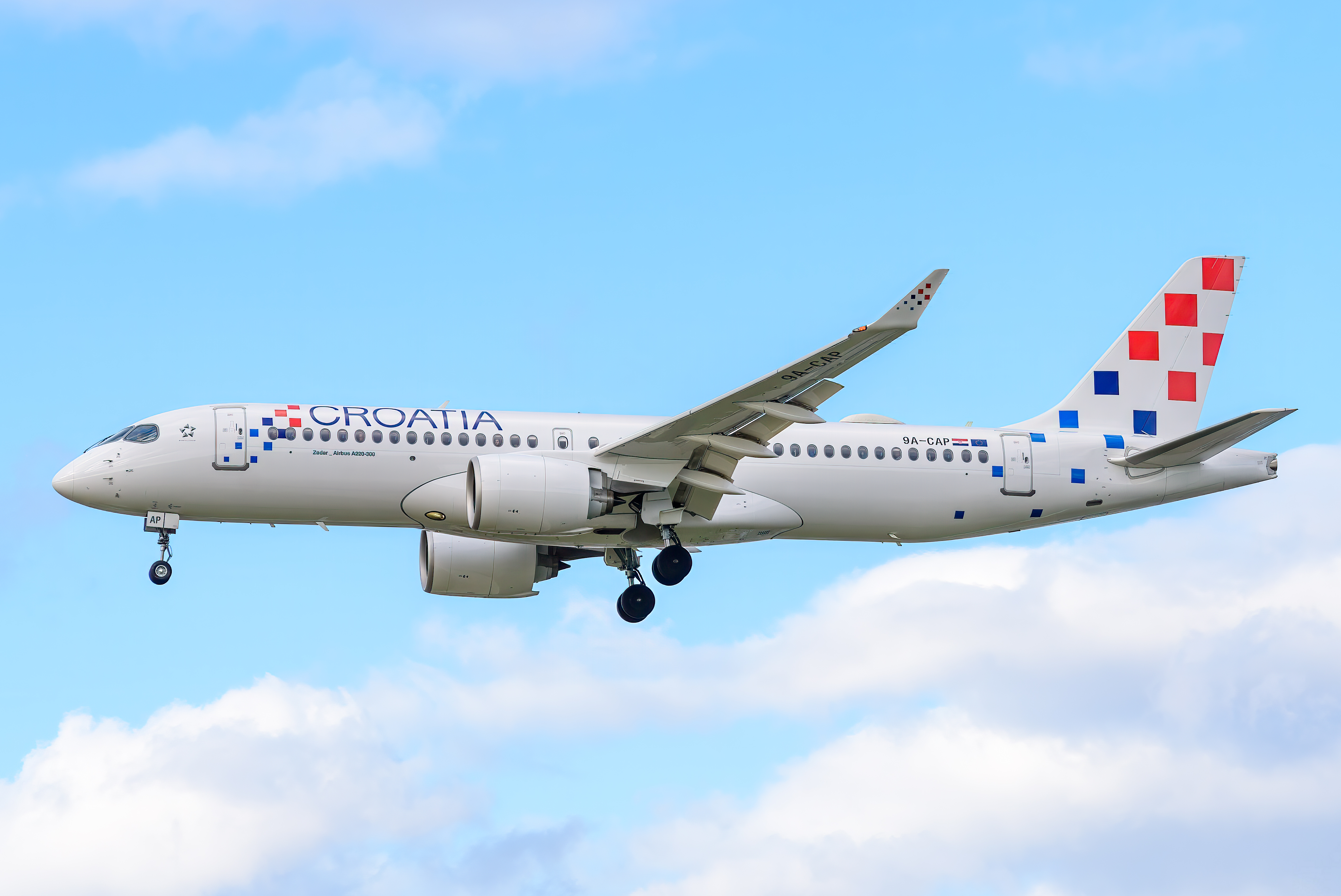
The flag carrier Croatia Airlines became an A220 operator in July 2024

2024

By January 2024 the global A220 fleet of 314 aircraft had completed more than 1,000,000 flights over 1,700,000 block hours on more than 1,350 routes to 400 destinations with 98.9% operational reliability. In February 2024, EgyptAir sold its relatively young fleet of 12 A220s to leasing company Azzora. Serviceability rates on the PW1500G engines were believed to be a factor in the decision. As of July 2024, the global A220 fleet had carried more than 100 million passengers. On 29 July 2024, the flag carrier Croatia Airlines took delivery of its first A220-300, part of a single type fleet renewal and the largest project in the airline's 35-year history. The first revenue flight took place on 6 August 2024 domestically from Zagreb to Split, and a day later internationally from Zagreb to Frankfurt, Germany, on the same route on which the airline operated its first international flight in 1992. On 20 September, the state-owned TAAG Angola Airlines took delivery of its first A220-300 as part of the modernization and growth of its fleet, and put it into commercial service on 11 November, connecting Luanda to a key Lusophony connection, São Tomé Island. Smartwings received its first A220-300 on 24 November and deployed it a day later on the Prague – Paris route under the Czech Airlines brand. Romanian airline AnimaWings received its first A220-300 from lessor Azorra on 16 December and was due to complete its first revenue flight on 27 December, making it the tenth A220 operator in Europe.

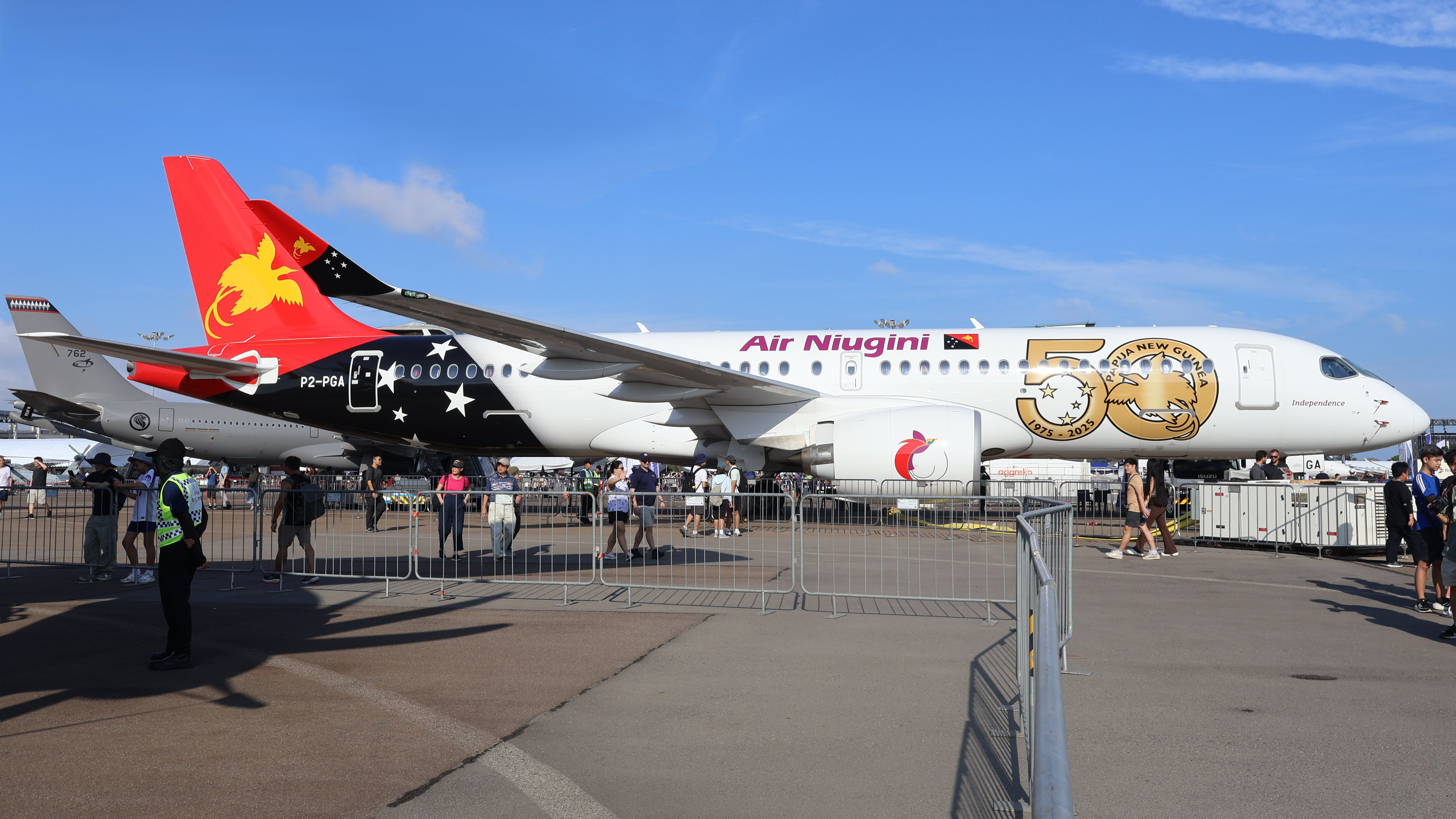
The flag carrier Air Niugini became an A220 operator in September 2025

2025

By January 2025 the global A220 fleet of 389 aircraft had completed more than 1,440,000 flights over 2,500,000 block hours on more than 1,500 routes to 470 destinations with 98.8% operational reliability. In March, Airbus investigated corrosion issues on a "limited number" of A220s, affecting some passenger seat fittings and wing components, including the wing fairing, which does not pose an immediate safety concern. In mid-April, an A220-300 from Egypt Air's former fleet was being dismantled as part of an agreement between lessor Azorra and Delta Material Services to supply spare parts for the repair of Delta's A220 fleet and other international airlines, where the engines were also leased to Delta. On 11 September, Papua New Guinea's flag carrier, Air Niugini, became the 25th A220 operator, strengthening the position in the Asia-Pacific market. The A220-300, nicknamed "People's Balus", was specially painted to commemorate the country's 50th anniversary and the delivery to Port Moresby International Airport marked the beginning of Air Niugini's fleet modernisation programme, with eight A220-100s ordered directly from Airbus and three A220-300s leased from Azorra.

2026

In July 2026, the A220 programme celebrated its 10th anniversary of commercial service, having carried over 240 million passengers and regularly serving more than 500 airports worldwide. By October the global A220 fleet of 544 aircraft had completed more than 2,410,000 flights over 4,250,000 block hours on more than 2,200 routes to 540 destinations with 99.0% operational reliability in the last 3 months.

=== Decarbonisation ===
The A220 family plays a key role in Airbus's commitment to its decarbonisation targets. The fuel-efficient aircraft can already fly with a blend of up to 50% Sustainable Aviation Fuel (SAF) and, like all other Airbus commercial aircraft, will be certified for 100% SAF capability by 2030. On 25 August 2025, Air France took delivery of its 46th A220-300 with a ferry flight from Airbus Canada, which for the first time used a fuel blend containing 50% SAF, certified directly by Airbus.

=== Dispatch reliability ===
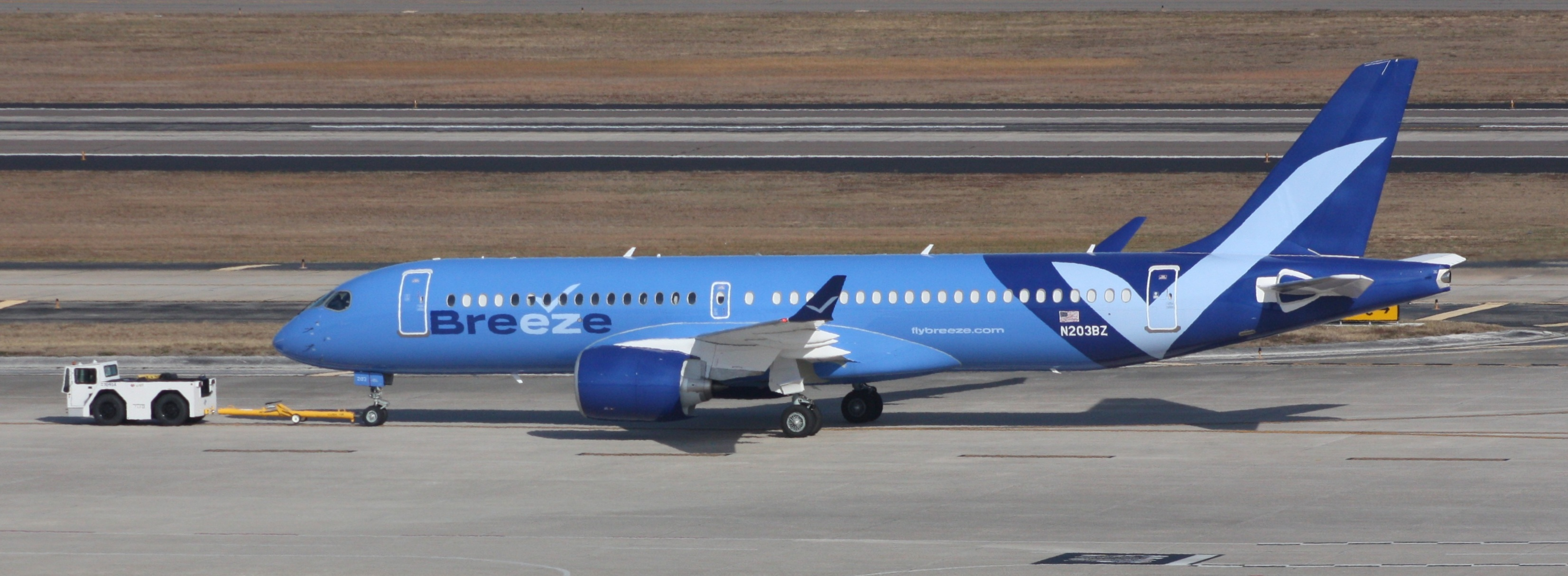
The A220 aircraft family achieved a 99.85% dispatch reliability in October 2017.

The clean sheet airliner was targeted to have a 99.0% dispatch reliability at entry into service. In August 2016, Swiss reported "much higher" reliability than other all-new airliners, citing Airbus's A320, A380 and Boeing's 787. After four months of service with Swiss, this goal seemed to have been met based on only three aircraft and 1,500 hours flown; "nuisance messages" from the integrated avionics suite and engine start-up delays had been the main griefs. Dispatch reliability rates of 99.0% were met in April 2017. A year after introduction, in July 2017, launch operators had fewer issues than expected for an all-new aircraft program. At this time point, airBaltic had already a 99.3–99.4% dispatch reliability, similar to the established Q400 but less than the relatively long-established, ubiquitous Boeing 737 Classic's 99.8%. The dispatch reliability improved further to 99.85% in October 2017.

=== Engine issues ===
==== Noise ====
The PW1500G's whale-like noise can be heard at the beginning of this video of a JetBlue A220-300 taking off from Boston.

The engines can emit a loud howl for a few seconds during throttle movements at low power settings. This distinctive howl was likened to the mating call of an orca, and led to noise complaints from residents near Zurich Airport when Swiss International Air Lines started operating the A220. A Pratt and Whitney official says that the engine noise is caused by a "low power transient combustor tone" which generally occurs on approach when the engine is at low or idle power. Under those conditions, the flame front inside the combustor causes pressure perturbations that interact with the walls of the combustor to create the whale sound. The noise has no repercussions on the operation of the engine.

==== Reliability ====
Since the PW1500G mount generates less strain on the turbine rotor assembly than the A320neo's PW1100G, it does not suffer from start-up and bearing problems but still from premature combustor degradation. An updated combustor liner with a 6,000–8,000 hour limit has been developed and a third generation for 2018 will raise it to 20,000 hours in benign environments.

After three inflight engine failures in 2019, Transport Canada issued an emergency airworthiness directive (EAD) limiting the power to 94% of N1 (Low Pressure Spool rotational speed) above 29,000 ft (8,800 m), disengaging the autothrottle for the climb over this altitude before engaging it again in cruise.

In June 2026, Airbus and Pratt & Whitney said the A220's engine issues have largely been resolved and expected that no A220 aircraft to remain grounded due to a lack of spare engines by the end of 2026. Only 2-3% of the grounded A220s are due to the engine problems at the time.

=== Maintenance ===
The A check originally took 5 hours and has since been reduced to less than 3 hours, fitting within an 8-hour work shift. It was scheduled after 850 flight hours, and this threshold has been increased to 1,000 flight hours. The C check is scheduled after 8,500 hours – translating to about 3.5 years of operation, and the interval could increase to 10,000 hours.

== Variants ==
There are two main variants of the five-abreast A220 family: the 35 m (115 ft) long A220-100 including the ACJ TwoTwenty corporate jet version, and the 3.7 m (12 ft) longer A220-300. Their over 99% commonality allows a common spare part inventory, reducing investment and maintenance costs.

=== A220-100 ===
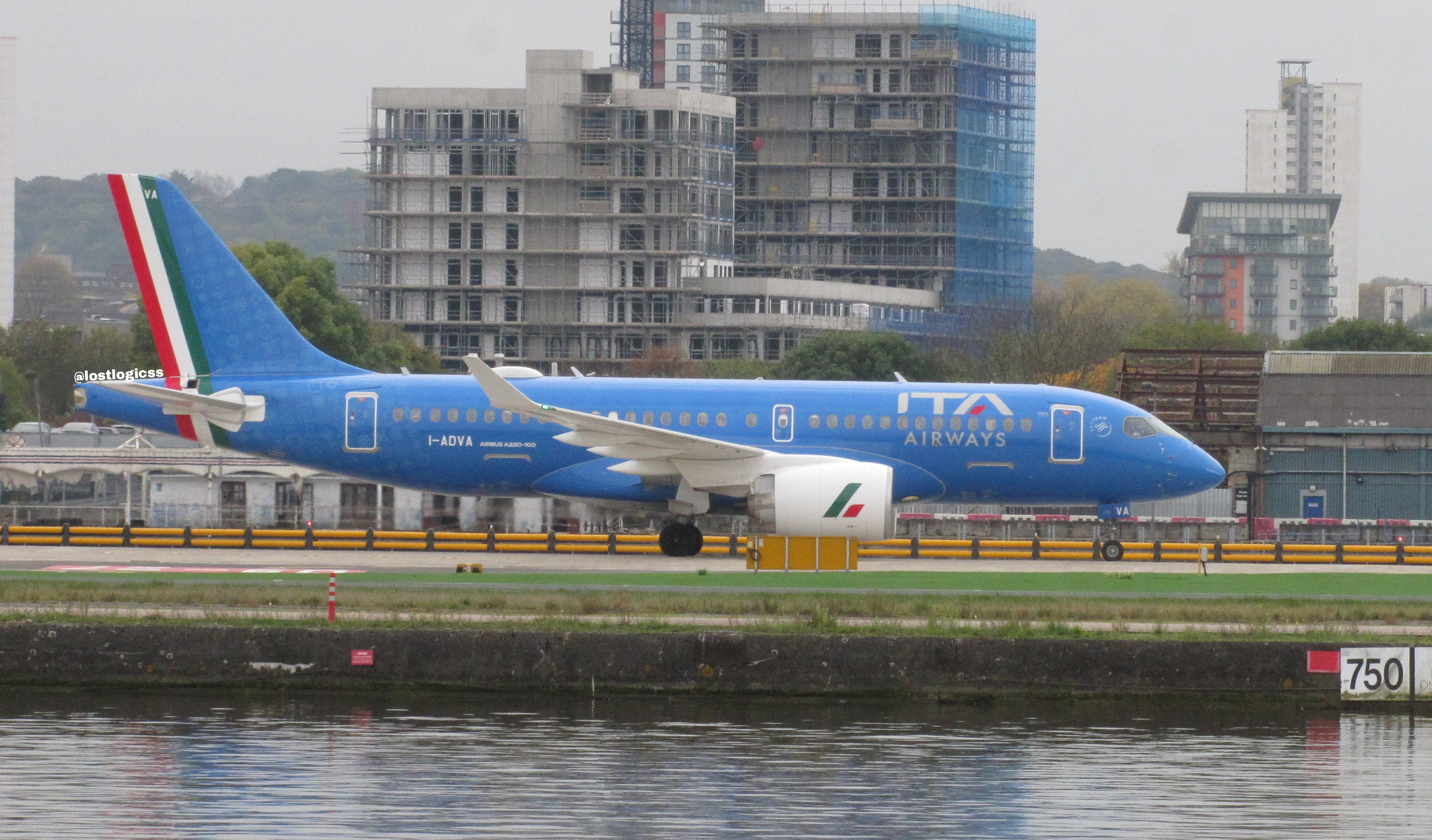
The A220-100 is certified by EASA for steep approach required for landing in London City Airport.

The A220-100 (ICAO code: BCS1) is the shorter variant of the A220 family at 35 m (115 ft) in length that can fly between 100 and 135 passengers over a distance of 3,600 nmi (6,667 km; 4,143 mi). The former CS100 made its maiden flight on 16 September 2013 and was first delivered to the launch operator Swiss Global Air Lines on 29 June 2016. The type entered service on 15 July 2016 with a revenue flight between Zurich and Paris. The A220-100 has a takeoff distance of 1,500 m (4,800 ft) and a landing distance of 1,390 m (4,550 ft) and is also certified for steep approaches by Transport Canada and EASA, making it one of the largest aircraft that can land at London City Airport (LCY) and connect it non-stop to New York City John F. Kennedy International Airport (JFK). The model marketing designation is the BD-500-1A10 for aircraft from serial number 50011, including the first aircraft delivered to Swiss (MSN-50010).

The A220-100, the smallest jetliner within the Airbus product line, competes with largest members of the four-abreast Embraer E-Jet E2 family, the E195-E2 and E190-E2, replacing the previous generation E-195, E190, as well as the five/six-abreast Boeing 717, 737-600, Airbus A318 and ageing models: McDonnell Douglas DC-9/MD-87, Fokker 100, BAe-146, and Boeing 737-500. The A220-100 is well ahead of the two E-Jet E2 variants in terms of range and payload, but the latter has a lower base price due to its more conservative design and correspondingly cheaper production costs. The unit price of an A220-100 is estimated at $81 million, while an E-190 E2 and E-195 E2 are priced at $61 million and $69 million, respectively. As of October 2026, there are 75 A220-100s in revenue service with five operators, where Delta is the largest operator with 45 aircraft in its fleet.

=== A220-300 ===
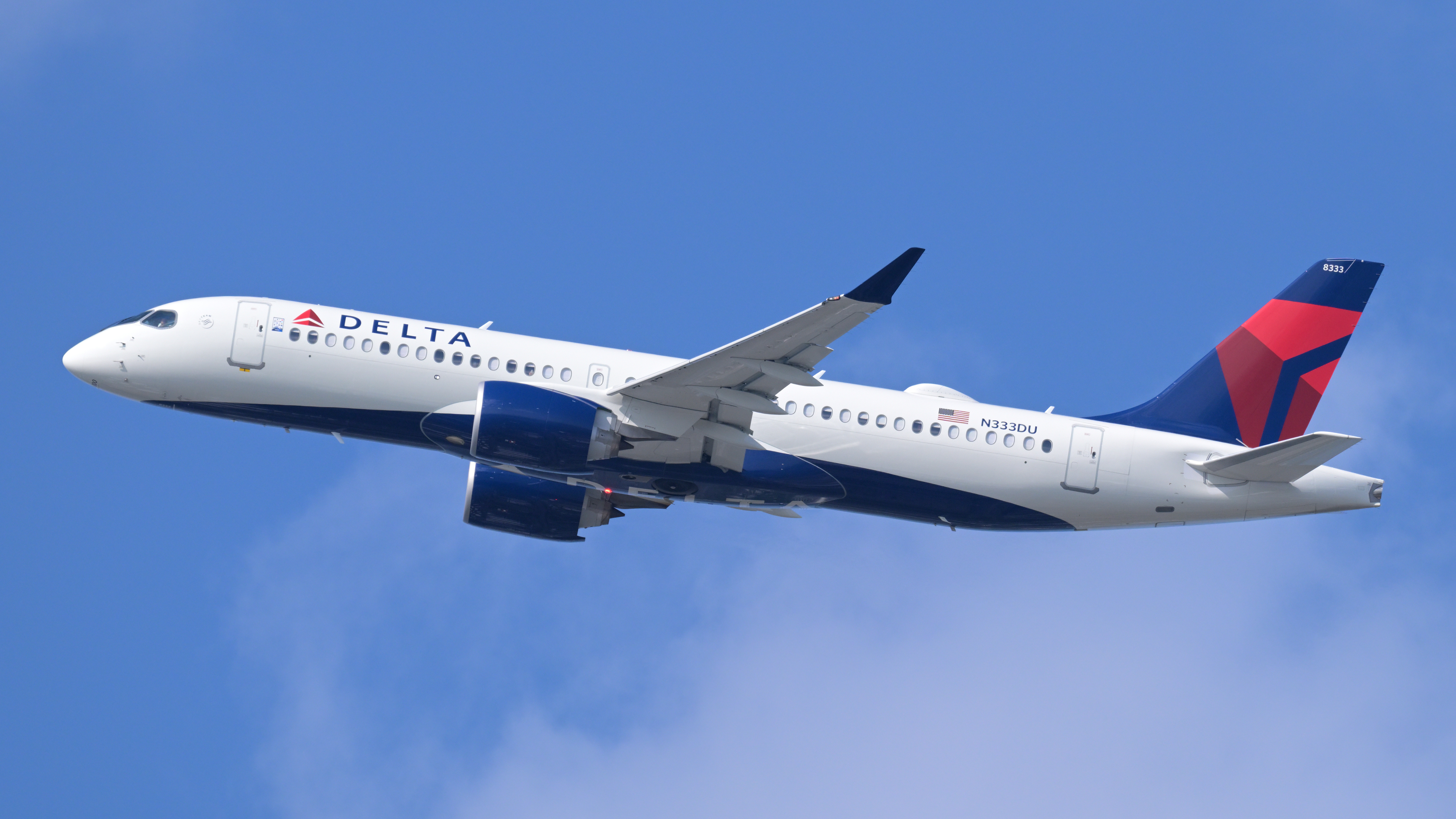
The A220-300 is the larger variant with a 38.71 m (127 ft) long fuselage or 3.7 m (12 ft) longer than A220-100.

The A220-300 (ICAO code: BCS3) is the larger variant with a 38.71 m (127 ft) long fuselage or 3.7 m (12 ft) longer than A220-100 and can carry between 120 and 160 passengers over a distance of 3,600 nmi (6,700 km; 4,100 mi). The former CS300 had its maiden flight on 27 February 2015, and the first delivery to airBaltic, the type launch operator, in November 2016. The type entered service on 14 December with a revenue flight from Riga to Amsterdam in a 145 seat two-class configuration. In several performance improvements, the MTOW and thus the permissible tank content were increased, where Delta received the first improved aircraft on 18 June 2019. Airbus offered a further 1 t (2,200 lb) increase to the MTOW of the A220-300, to 70.9 t (156,000 lb) in March 2021, providing another 200 nmi (370 km; 230 mi) of additional range to 3,550 nmi (6,570 km; 4,090 mi). On long routes the payload will be increased by about 900 kg (2,000 lb). The model marketing designation is the BD-500-1A11 for aircraft from serial number 55003.

The A220-300 complements the A319neo in the Airbus fleet and competes with the Boeing 737 MAX 7 and, to some extent, with the Embraer E195-E2, replacing previous generation airliners, smaller variants of the 737 Next Gen/737 Classic and McDonnell Douglas MD-90/MD-80 series. The A220-300 was designed to be 6 t (13,000 lb) lighter than the A319neo and nearly 8 t (18,000 lb) lighter than the 737 MAX 7, giving it better operating costs of up to 12%. Furthermore, the unit price of an A220-300 is estimated at just $91.5 million, while an A319neo is priced at $101.5 million. These cost advantages and other aspects contribute to the A220-300 outselling the A319neo as well as the 737-7. As of October 2026, there are 480 A220-300s in commercial service with 23 operators, where JetBlue is the largest operator with 70 aircraft in its fleet.

=== ACJ TwoTwenty ===
Since 2020, the Airbus A220 has also been available as a business jet under the name ACJ TwoTwenty, which is a variant of the A220-100 with a range of 5,650 nmi (6,500 mi; 10,460 km) and customisable cabin space of 73 m^{2} (790 sq ft) for 18 passengers. To increase its range, the type is offered with up to five removable auxiliary centre fuel tanks. The ACJ TwoTwenty made its first flight on 14 December 2021, and was to be outfitted with a VIP cabin in Indianapolis, before its first delivery to Comlux expected in 2023.

== Operators ==
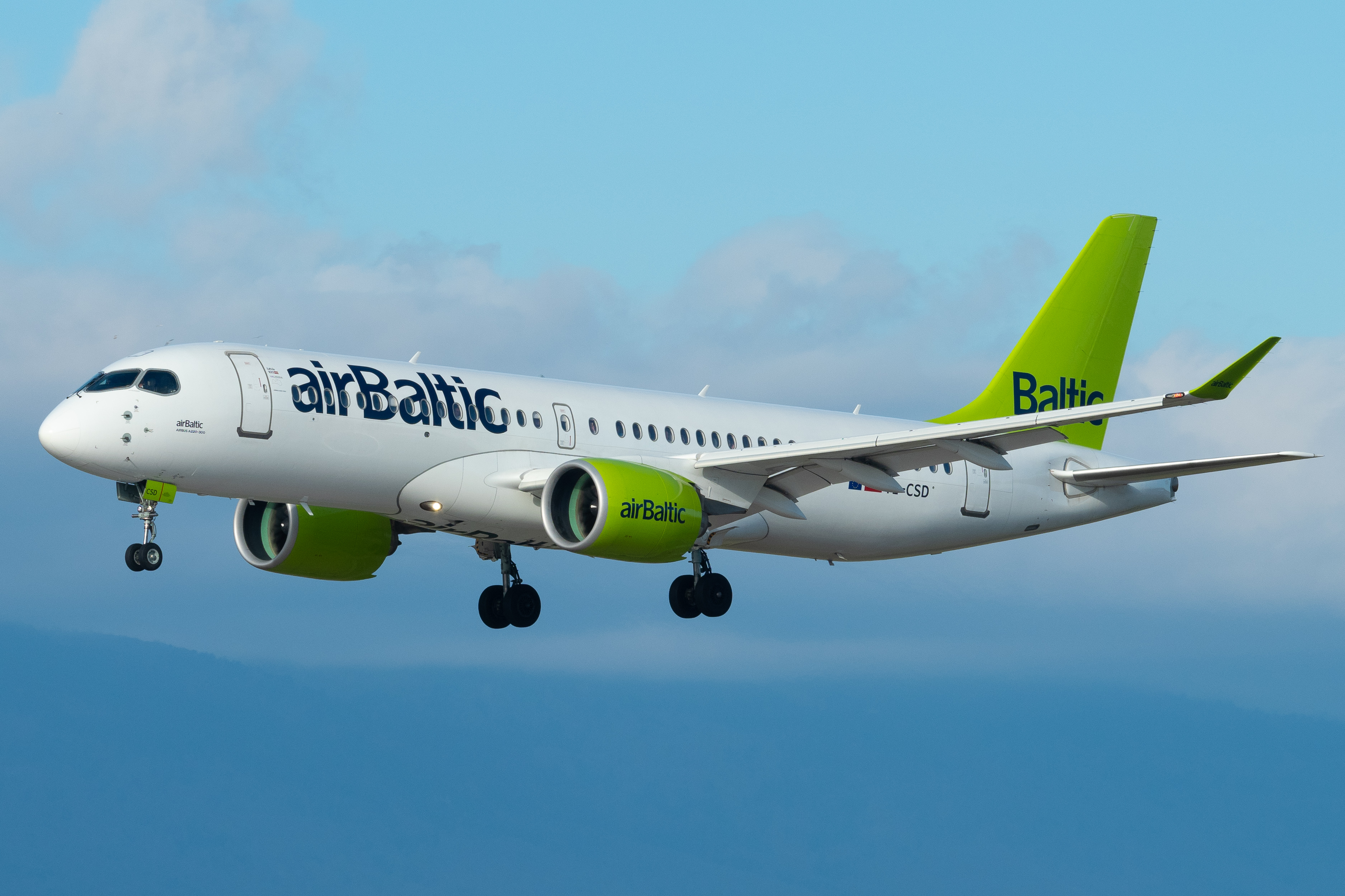
airBaltic has a pure A220-300 fleet and was the launch operator of the type.

As of October 2026, there are 555 A220 family aircraft in service with 21 commercial operators amongst other undisclosed operators. The five largest A220 operators are Delta Air Lines (96), JetBlue (70), Breeze Airways (67), Air France (59) and airBaltic (54).

=== Orders and deliveries ===
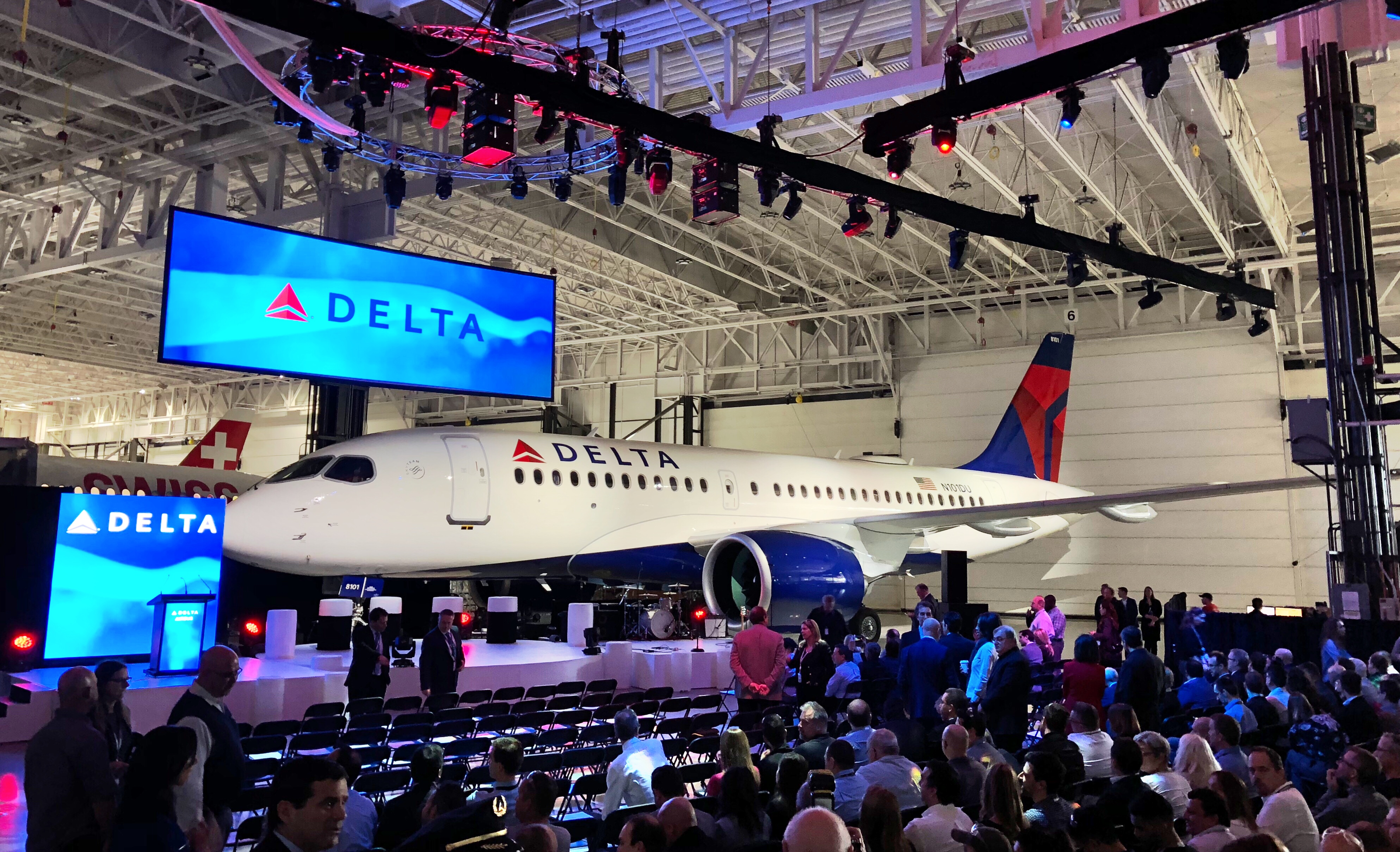
Delta took delivery of its first A220 in October 2018 and has since become the largest operator of the A220 family.

The A220 family has a market share of more than 55% in the small commercial aircraft sector as of July 2024.. In May 2026, the total order for the A220 family exceeded 1,000 aircraft. It has 1,105 firm orders from 35 customers, of which AirAsia is the largest with 150 orders, and a total of 559 aircraft have been delivered as of October 2026.

In May 2026, AirAsia placed a record order of 150 A220-300 and became the first customer for the high-density A220-300 with 160 seat configuration. The order confirmed the aircraft's ability to serve both premium regional sector and the low-cost sector, which was seen as "one of the most strategically important developments for the programme since airBaltic transformed the aircraft from a niche regional jet into a globally recognised narrowbody success story."

Orders and deliveries by type (summary)
Type	Orders	Deliveries	Backlog
A220-100	108	75	33
A220-300	997	484	513
A220 family	1,105	559	546

A220 family orders and deliveries by year (distributive)
	2009	2010	2011	2012	2013	2014	2015	2016	2017	2018	2019	2020	2021	2022	2023	2024	2025	2026	Total
Orders	50	40	43	15	34	61	—	117	12	165 (Note: The first 402 firm orders through June 2018 were booked as CSeries, but some of these were later canceled)	63	30	38	105	141	−9	44	156	1,105
Deliveries	—	—	—	—	—	—	—	7	17	33 (Note: The first 37 deliveries through June 2018 were made as CSeries: 8 as CS100 and 29 as CS300)	48	38	50	53	68	75	93	77	559

A220 family orders and deliveries by year (cumulative)
Orders Deliveries
Data as of October 2026.

== Accidents and incidents ==
The A220 family has recorded one engine-related accident with one fatality due to smoke on board, and one hull loss following a ground fire, as of March 2026.

=== Accidents ===
- On 23 December 2024, a SWISS International Air Lines A220-300 operating as Flight 1885 from Henri Coanda International Airport to Zurich Airport, diverted to Graz Airport after smoke developed in the cabin and cockpit due to an engine problem, while in cruise flight at FL400. All 79 people on board were evacuated via emergency slides, and the five crew members plus twelve passengers received medical treatment, while an incapacitated cabin crew member was rushed to hospital by helicopter, but died a week later on 30 December.
- On 14 June 2025, an airBaltic Airbus A220-300 was undergoing an auxiliary power unit ground-run during scheduled maintenance when a fire ignited in the centre section of the aircraft. The fire was reportedly caused by an ozone filter and resulted in significant thermal damage to the fuselage and wing root section, but no injuries. In December 2025, Airbus Engineering concluded that the aircraft was uneconomical to repair. The aircraft was then written off, marking the first hull loss of an A220 family aircraft.

=== Incidents ===
- After three inflight shutdowns due to PW1500G engine failure in July, September, and October 2019, Swiss International Air Lines temporarily withdrew its fleet for inspection.
- On 1 January 2024, a trespasser on the apron at Salt Lake City International Airport died after climbing into the idling engine of a Delta Air Lines A220 that was standing at a de-icing pad.
- On 4 January 2025, an Air Canada A220-300 operating as AC609 from Halifax Stanfield International Airport to Toronto-Pearson International Airport suffered a pressurization issue during the climb. Unable to adjust the cabin altitude in manual control, the crew decided to return to base (RTB). After replacing the aft cargo vent flap idler bearing, which had sheared off and caused the vent to open, the aircraft was returned to service.

== Aircraft on display ==
- The third flight test vehicle or FTV3 (A220-100) with around 1,400 flight hours was officially donated on 17 October 2018 at St-Hubert airport to Quebec’s École Nationale d’Aérotechnique (ÉNA), the Canadian province’s sole provider of technical training for aerospace workers, a school affiliated with cégep Édouard-Montpetit.
- The first flight test vehicle or FTV1 (A220-100) with around 760 flight hours was converted into an A220 full-size mock-up on 28 May 2021, at the Airspace Customer Showroom (ACS) located in Toulouse, France. The mock-up will be used by customers who have already selected the A220 and for Airbus to design new cabin layouts. Airlines that are in the final stages of configuring their aircraft will be able to test their lighting and seat selection on the mock-up before their aircraft is delivered.
- The second and seventh flight test vehicles FTV2 (A220-100) and FTV7 (A220-300) respectively were repatriated in December 2023 from Wichita, Kansas (USA) to the main facility in Mirabel, Quebec, where both became part of the A220 Flight and Integration Tests Center, which began operations on 1 January 2024. It is the second Airbus flight test center, consisting of the two aforementioned test aircraft and aircraft test beds, and is intended to ensure continuous improvement of the A220 family aircraft, in particular by supporting the development of sustainable aviation fuels and studies on the recycling of aviation materials through the partnerships between Airbus, SMEs, research centers and universities.

== Specifications ==
Airbus A220 specifications
Variant	A220-100	A220-300
Cockpit crew	Two	
Max. seating	135	160
Typical 2-class seating	100–120	120–150
Seat pitch	71 cm (28 in) in Y, 97 cm (38 in) in J	
Seat width	47 to 53 cm (18.5 to 21 in)	
Cargo volume	23.7 m^{3} (840 cu ft)	31.6 m^{3} (1,120 cu ft)
Length	35 m (114 ft 10 in)	38.71 m (127 ft)
Wing	35.1 m (115 ft 2 in) span 112.3 m^{2} (1,209 sq ft) area (10.97 AR)	
Height	11.5 m (37 ft 9 in)	
Fuselage diameter	3.5 m (11 ft 6 in)	
Cabin	3.28 m (10 ft 9 in) width, 2.11 m (6 ft 11 in) height	
Cabin length	23.7 m (77 ft 9 in)	27.5 m (90 ft 3 in)
MTOW	63.7 t (140,000 lb)	70.9 t (156,000 lb)
Maximum payload	15.1 t (33,300 lb)	18.7 t (41,200 lb)
OEW	35.22 t (77,650 lb)	37.08 t (81,750 lb)
Fuel capacity	21,918 L (5,790 US gal; 4,821 imp gal)	
Range	3,600 nmi (6,700 km; 4,200 mi)	3,400 nmi (6,300 km; 3,900 mi)
Cruise speed	Mach 0.82 (488 kn; 905 km/h; 562 mph) max at 27,500 ft Mach 0.78 (447 kn; 829 km/h; 515 mph) typical	
Takeoff distance (@ MTOW)	1,500 m (4,800 ft)	1,900 m (6,200 ft)
Landing distance (@ MLW)	1,390 m (4,550 ft)	1,510 m (4,950 ft)
Ceiling	12,500 m (41,000 ft)	
Engines	2× Pratt & Whitney PW1500G	
Unit thrust	PW1519G: 88 kN (20,000 lb); PW1521G: 98 kN (22,000 lb); PW1524G: 108.5 kN (24,400 lb); PW1525G: 108.5 kN (24,400 lb)	PW1521G-3: 98 kN (22,000 lb); PW1524G-3: 108.5 kN (24,400 lb); PW1525G-3: 108.5 kN (24,400 lb)
ICAO type	BCS1	BCS3

=== Aircraft type designations ===
Aircraft model	Certification date	Engines
A220-100	9 May 2023	PW1519G
A220-100	18 October 2021	PW1521G
A220-100	16 June 2016	PW1524G
A220-300	7 October 2016	PW1521G-3
A220-300	26 April 2017	PW1524G-3

== See also ==
Related development

- Bombardier CRJ700/900/1000
- Comac C919 (agreement between Comac and Bombardier for program commonalities)
- Yakovlev MC-21 (agreement between Irkut and Bombardier for joint customer support)

Aircraft of comparable role, configuration, and era

- Airbus A320neo family
- Boeing 717
- Boeing 737 MAX
- Comac C909
- Embraer E-Jets/E-Jets E2
- Yakovlev SJ-100

Related lists

- List of civil aircraft
- List of jet airliners
