= Limits and fits =

In mechanical engineering, limits and fits are a set of rules regarding the dimensions and tolerances of mating machined parts. Limits and Fits are given to a part's dimensions to gain the desired type of fit. This is seen most commonly in regulating shaft sizes with hole sizes.

Limits and Fits are standardized by the International Organization for Standardization (ISO) and the American National Standards Institute (ANSI). Tables are used to quickly calculate required tolerances for bolt holes, shafts, mating parts, and many similar scenarios.

Units for limits and fits are typically specified in thousandths of an inch or hundredths of a millimeter.

== Types of fit ==
There are three main types of fit:

- Clearance Fit: a fit between mating parts with positive space in-between. Parts will freely move between each other.
- Transition Fit: a fit between mating parts between the clearance and interference fit. Parts fit together easily enough so that force is not required, but will still hold together on its own.
- Interference/Press Fit: a fit between mating parts with negative space in-between. The parts will need applied force to fit together and hold firmly together once assembled.

These main three types of fit are umbrella categories for different sub-categories of fits. Sub-categories include sliding fit, running fit, push fit, wringing fit, force fit, tight fit, and shrink fit. Every different type of fit is used for a different type of interaction between mating parts.

== See also ==
[edit]

- Engineering fit
- Engineering tolerance
- Geometric dimensioning and tolerancing
- Precision engineering
- Specification (technical standard)
- Tolerance analysis
- Tolerance coning
- Tolerance interval
- Verification and validation
