= Japanese Aero Engine Corporation =

Consortium of 3 Japanese companies

- Company type: Joint venture
- Industry: Aerospace
- Founded: 1981; 45 years ago
- Headquarters: Chūō-ku, Tokyo, Japan
- Products: Aircraft engines
- Owners: Kawasaki Heavy Industries; Ishikawajima-Harima Heavy Industries; Mitsubishi Heavy Industries
- Website: www.jaec.or.jp

The Japanese Aero Engine Corporation is a consortium of several large Japanese companies (Kawasaki Heavy Industries, Ishikawajima-Harima Heavy Industries, Mitsubishi Heavy Industries that develops and manufactures aero engines.

The joint venture was formally established during 1981, it became a part of the larger International Aero Engines (IAE) consortium in the following year. Via IAE, the group was involved in the manufacture of the V2500 turbofan engine, which became the second most successful commercial jet engine program in production today in terms of volume, and the third most successful commercial jet engine program in aviation history. The Japanese Aero Engine Corporation has been involved in a number of other engines, including the General Electric CF34-8/-10, General Electric GEnx, Rolls-Royce Trent 1000, Pratt & Whitney PW1100/1400G-JM, General Electric Passport 20 engine and General Electric GE9X.

== History ==
During the late 1970s, Kawasaki Heavy Industries, Ishikawajima-Harima Heavy Industries, Mitsubishi Heavy Industries partnered with British engine manufacturer Rolls-Royce, originally to help develop the 20000 lbf RJ500 civil turbofan. Although two prototype engines were built and ground tested, the RJ500 project was cancelled when American aerospace manufacturer Boeing decided to reject the engine in favour of the competing CFM56-3 to power the 737-300 instead.

Around 1982, the consortium's attention was redirected towards the co-development of a more advanced engine in the 25000lb_{f} thrust class for the 150 seater market. Pratt & Whitney, MTU and FiatAvio joined the consortium, by then named International Aero Engines, shortly afterwards. The V in V2500 denotes the five original partners, whilst 2500 symbolizes the original thrust level of 25000 lb_{f}. FiatAvio later withdrew from the V2500 consortium. Workshare on the joint venture's first engine, the V2500, was divided between the constituent aero-engine companies. Rolls-Royce based the high pressure compressor on a scale-up of the RC34B eight stage research unit used in the RB401-06 Demonstrator Engine, but with a zero-stage added at the front and a tenth stage added to the rear. Pratt & Whitney developed the combustor and the 2-stage air-cooled high pressure turbine, while the Japanese Aero Engine Corporation provided the low pressure compression system. MTU Aero Engines were responsible for the 5-stage low pressure turbine, while Fiat Avio designed the gearbox. The initial version of this engine, the V2500-A1, first entered service with Slovenian flag carrier Adria Airways.

The Japanese Aero Engine Corporation provides investigation, research, testing, and analysis on the development of commercial aircraft engines, along with various services related to the production, sales, and maintenance of aero engines. In the decades since its establishment, the consortium has been involved in the development of numerous civil aero engines via international collaborations. Under such structures, it has manufactured elements of the following engines: IAE V2500, General Electric CF34-8/-10, General Electric GEnx, Rolls-Royce Trent 1000, Pratt & Whitney PW1100/1400G-JM, General Electric Passport 20 engine and General Electric GE9X.
