= IAE V2500 =

High-bypass turbofan engine

V2500
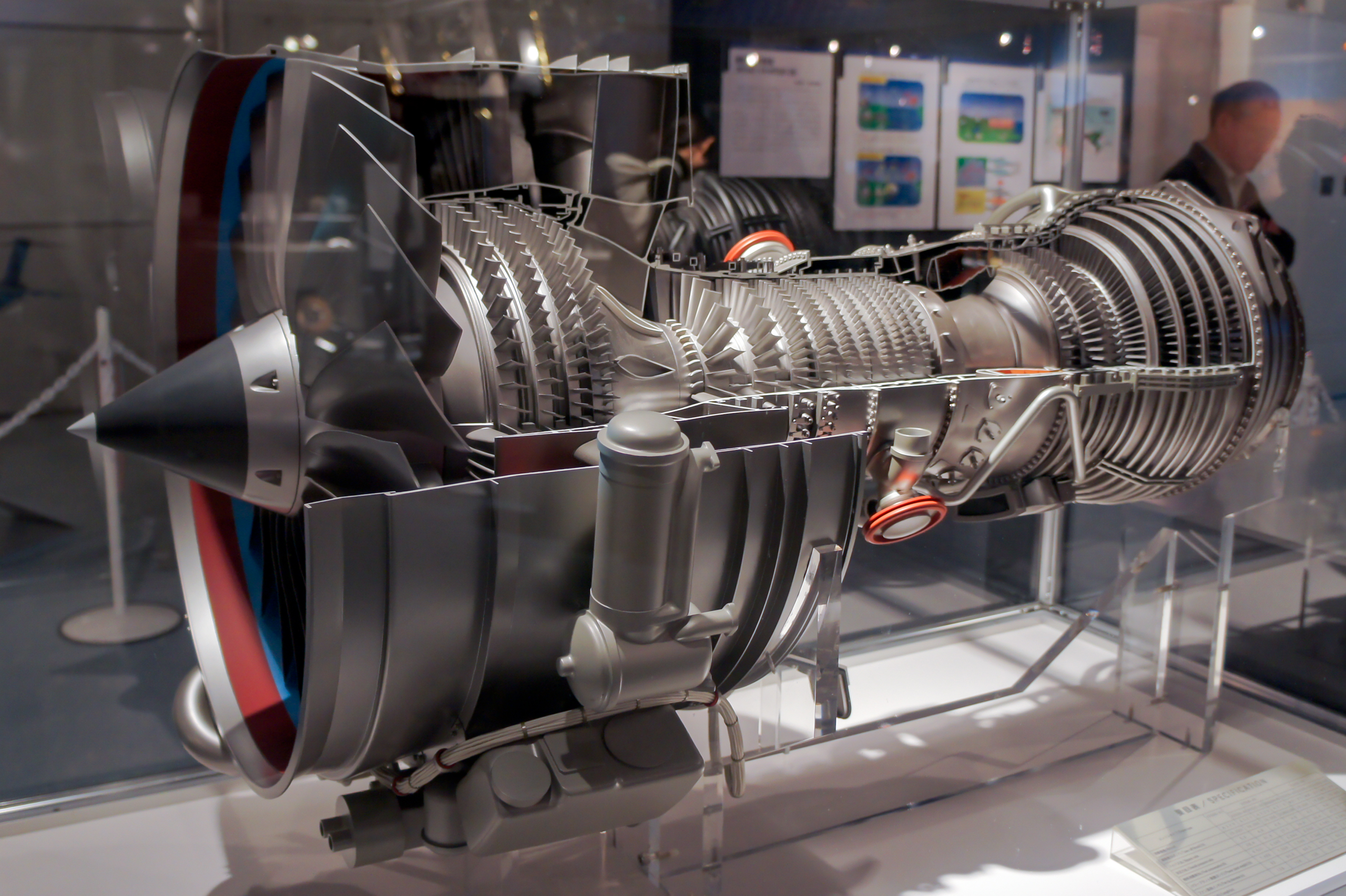
- The V2500-A5/D5/E5 has one fan, four low- and ten high-pressure compressor stages, and two high- and five low-pressure turbine stages.
- Type: Turbofan
- Manufacturer: International Aero Engines
- First run: 1987
- Major applications: Airbus A320 family; McDonnell Douglas MD-90; Embraer C-390
- Number built: Over 7,600 (June 2018)

The IAE V2500 is a two-shaft high-bypass turbofan engine built by International Aero Engines (IAE) which powers the Airbus A320 family, the McDonnell Douglas MD-90, and the Embraer C-390 Millennium.

The engine's name is a combination of the Roman numeral V, symbolizing the five original members of the International Aero Engines consortium, formed in 1983 to produce the engine, and 2500, which represents the 25,000-pound-force (110 kN) thrust produced by the original engine model, the V2500-A1. FAA type certification for the V2500 was granted in 1988.

The maintenance, repair, and operations market for the V2500 is close to US$3 billion as of 2015.

== Development ==
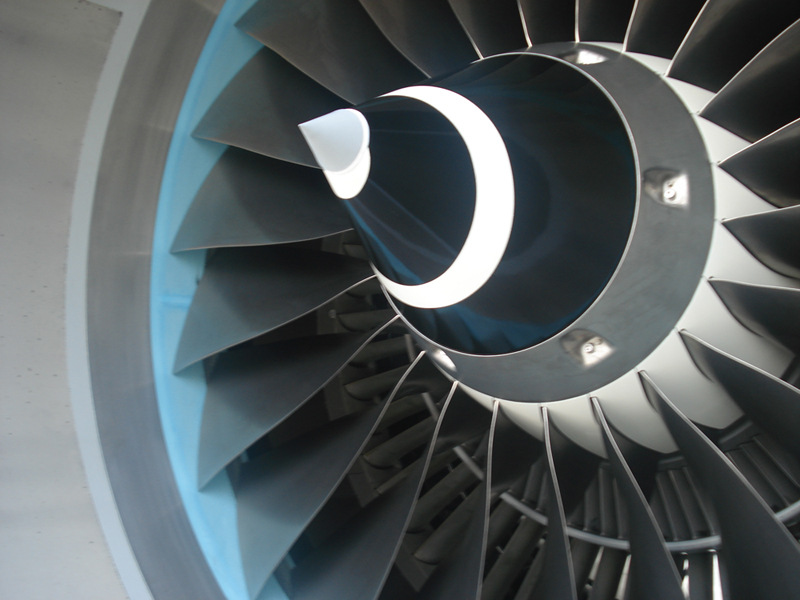
The 22-blade fan of an A320's V2500-A1

Rolls-Royce based the ten-stage high-pressure compressor on an eight-stage run in the RB401 in the mid 1970s followed by a nine-stage run in the RJ.500. The V.2500 would use ten stages, with the first four with variable stators, giving a pressure ratio of 20:1. A single-stage booster was also part of the original configuration. Serious handling problems (inability to accelerate without surging) with this arrangement resulted in a redesigned compression system. The pressure ratio was reduced to 16:1 which needed a fifth variable stage and revised blading in the rear stages. Two extra booster stages were required to restore the original overall pressure ratio. A fourth booster stage would be added after the initial variant entered service. Pratt & Whitney developed the combustor and the two-stage air-cooled high-pressure turbine, while the Japanese Aero Engine Corporation provided the low-pressure compression system. MTU Aero Engines were responsible for the five-stage low-pressure turbine and Fiat Avio designed the gearbox.

In 1989, its unit cost was US$4.7 million. The 4,000th V2500 was delivered in August 2009 to the Brazilian flag carrier TAM and installed on the 4,000th Airbus A320 family aircraft, an A319. In early 2012, the 5,000th V2500 engine was delivered to SilkAir, and IAE achieved 100 million flying hours. Six years later, in June 2018, over 7,600 engines were delivered and the V2500 achieved 200 million flight hours on 3,100 aircraft in service.

== Variants ==
=== V2500-A1 ===
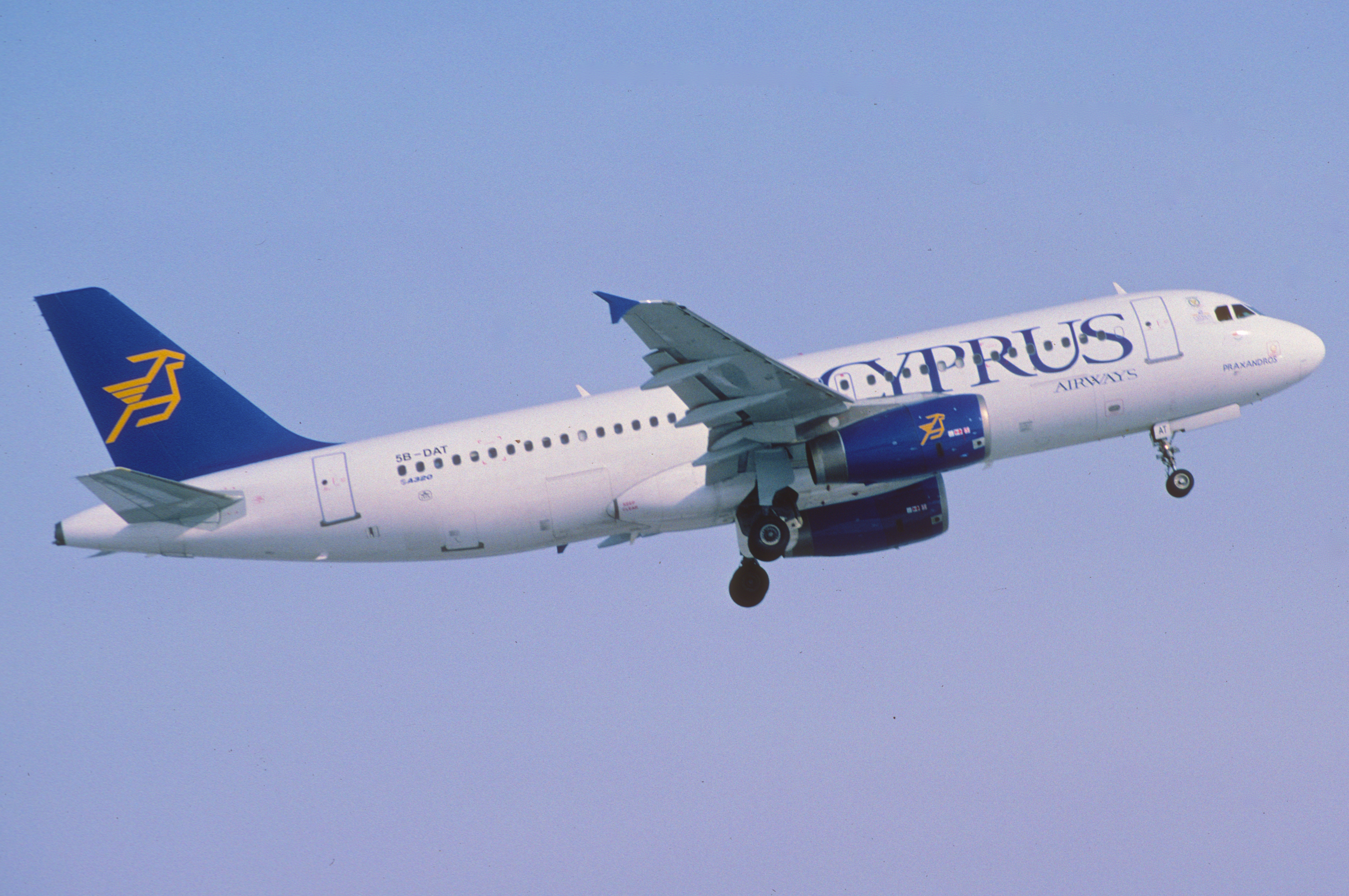
First A320-231 of Cyprus Airways with the original V2500-A1 engines, as seen in 2004.

The original version has one fan stage, three low- and ten high-pressure compression stages, and two high- and five low-pressure turbine stages. This engine promised better fuel burn on the Airbus A320 than the competing CFM56-5A; however, initial reliability issues, coupled with insufficient thrust for the larger A321, prompted the development of the improved V2500-A5 variant. It first entered service with Cyprus Airways.

=== V2500-A5 ===
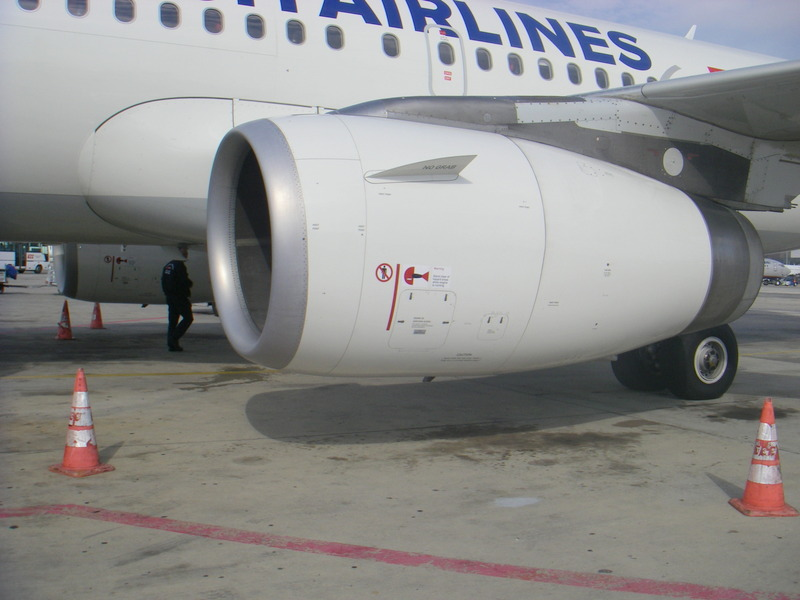
An IAE V2500-A5 fitted on a Turkish Airlines Airbus A319

A fourth booster stage was introduced into the engine basic configuration to increase core flow. This, together with a minor fan diameter and airflow increase, helped to increase the maximum thrust to 33,000 lbf (147 kN) thrust, to meet the requirements of the larger Airbus A321. Soon, Airbus offered derated versions of the V2500-A5 on the Airbus A319 and Airbus A320, enabling the same engine hardware to be used across all Airbus A320 family aircraft, with the exception of the Airbus A318. The vast majority of V2500s are of the A5 variety.

=== V2500-D5 ===
This engine retains the configuration of the V2500-A5 but is fitted with different mounting hardware and accessory gearboxes to facilitate installation on the McDonnell Douglas MD-90.

=== V2500-E5 ===
This engine retains the configuration of the V2500-A5 but is fitted with different mounting hardware and accessory gearboxes to facilitate installation on the Embraer KC-390.

=== De-rated and increased-thrust variants ===
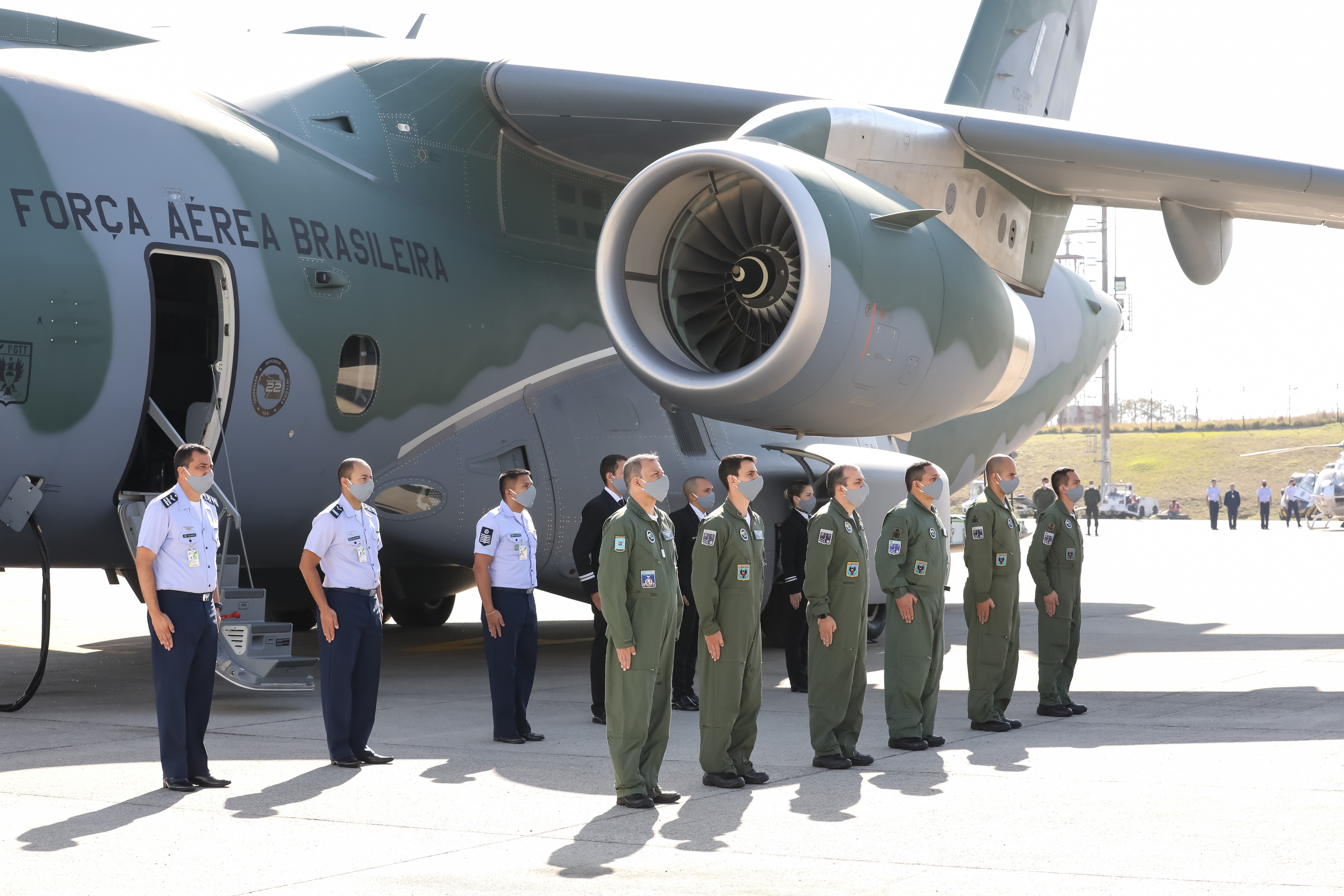
An IAE V2500 fitted on a Brazilian Air Force Embraer C-390

A number of de-rated engines compliant with Stage 4 noise regulations have been produced from the -A5 configuration, as well as two variants with significant increase in thrust, thus expanding the thrust range from 23,500 lbf to 33,000 lbf:

- The 23,500 lbf (105 kN) thrust V2524-A5 for the Airbus A319
- The 24,800 lbf (110 kN) thrust V2527-A5 for the Airbus A320
- The 25,000 lbf (110 kN) thrust V2525-D5 for the McDonnell Douglas MD-90-30. Engine accessories are mounted on the side instead of bottom to accommodate lateral mounting.
- The 28,000 lbf (120 kN) thrust V2528-D5 for the McDonnell Douglas MD-90-30. Same as V2525-D5 but with 3,000 pounds (13 kN) more thrust.
- The 33,000 lbf (150 kN) thrust V2533-A5 for the Airbus A321
- The 31,330 lbf (139.4 kN) thrust V2531-E5 for the Embraer C-390 Millennium

=== V2500SelectOne ===
On October 10, 2005, IAE announced the launch of the V2500Select—later called V2500SelectOne—with a sale to IndiGo to power 100 A320-series aircraft. The V2500SelectOne is a combination performance improvement package and aftermarket agreement. In February 2009, Pratt & Whitney upgraded the first V2500-A5 to the SelectOne Retrofit standard; the engine was owned by US Airways and had been in use since 1998.

=== V2500SelectTwo ===
On March 15, 2011, IAE announced an upgrade option of V2500 SelectOne Engines to the SelectTwo Program. It offers reduced fuel consumption due to a software upgrade and Reduced Ground Idle (RGI), and is available since 2014 for the V2500-A5 variants.

== Applications ==
- Airbus A320ceo family (excluding A318)
- Embraer C-390 Millennium
- McDonnell Douglas MD-90

== Specifications ==
Data from Type Certificate Data Sheet

==== General characteristics ====
- Type: Dual-rotor, axial-flow, high-bypass turbofan
- Length: 3.201 m (126.0 in)
- Diameter: 1.682 m (66.2 in) width, 63.5 in (1.613 m) fan diameter (Note: V2500-A1: 63 in (1.600 m))
- Dry weight: 2,404–2,595 kg (5,300–5,721 lb)

==== Components ====
- Compressor: 1 fan, 4 low-pressure, 10 high-pressure
- Combustors: Annular
- Turbine: 2 high-pressure, 5 low-pressure

==== Performance ====
- Maximum thrust: 102.48–140.56 kN (23,040–31,600 lbf)
- Thrust-to-weight ratio: 4.18–5.73
- Rotor speed: low pressure: 5,650 RPM, high pressure: 14,950 RPM
- Control: Dual channel FADEC

Variants
| Variant | Certification | Take-Off Thrust | Weight | T/W | BPR | Comp. | Application |
|---|---|---|---|---|---|---|---|
| V2500-A1 | 1 June 1988 | 110.31 kN (24,800 lbf) | 2,404 kg (5,300 lb) | 4.68 | 5.4:1 | 35.8:1 | Airbus A320 |
| V2527E-A5 | 14 August 1995 | 110.31 kN (24,800 lbf) | 2,404 kg (5,300 lb) | 4.50 | 4.8:1 | 32.8:1 | Airbus A320 |
| V2527-A5 | 21 November 1992 | 108.89 kN (24,480 lbf) | 2,404 kg (5,300 lb) | 4.44 | 4.8:1 | 32.8:1 | Airbus A320 |
| V2527M-A5 | 24 May 1999 | 133.00 kN (29,900 lbf) | 2,404 kg (5,300 lb) | 5.43 | 4.8:1 | 32.8:1 | Airbus A320 |
| V2522-A5 | 10 June 1996 | 102.48 kN (23,040 lbf) | 2,404 kg (5,300 lb) | 4.18 | 4.9:1 | 32.8:1 | Airbus A319 |
| V2524-A5 | 10 June 1996 | 102.48 kN (23,040 lbf) | 2,404 kg (5,300 lb) | 4.18 | 4.9:1 | 32.8:1 | Airbus A319 |
| V2530-A5 | 29 November 1992 | 133.30 kN (29,970 lbf) | 2,404 kg (5,300 lb) | 5.73 | 4.6:1 | 35.2:1 | Airbus A321 |
| V2533-A5 | 14 August 1996 | 140.56 kN (31,600 lbf) | 2,404 kg (5,300 lb) | 5.73 | 4.5:1 | 35.2:1 | Airbus A321 |
| V2531-E5 | 20 June 2015 | 139.36 kN (31,330 lbf) | 2,404 kg (5,300 lb) | 5.68 | 4.7:1 | 36.2:1 | Embraer KC-390 |
| V2525-D5 | 29 November 1992 | 111.20 kN (25,000 lbf) | 2,595 kg (5,721 lb) | 4.20 | 4.8:1 | 34.5:1 | McDonnell Douglas MD-90 |
| V2528-D5 | 29 November 1992 | 124.55 kN (28,000 lbf) | 2,595 kg (5,721 lb) | 4.71 | 4.7:1 | 35.2:1 | McDonnell Douglas MD-90 |

== See also ==
Comparable engines

- CFM International CFM56
- Pratt & Whitney PW6000

Related lists

- List of aircraft engines
