= Pratt & Whitney PW1000G =

Geared turbofan engine produced beginning 2007

PW1000G

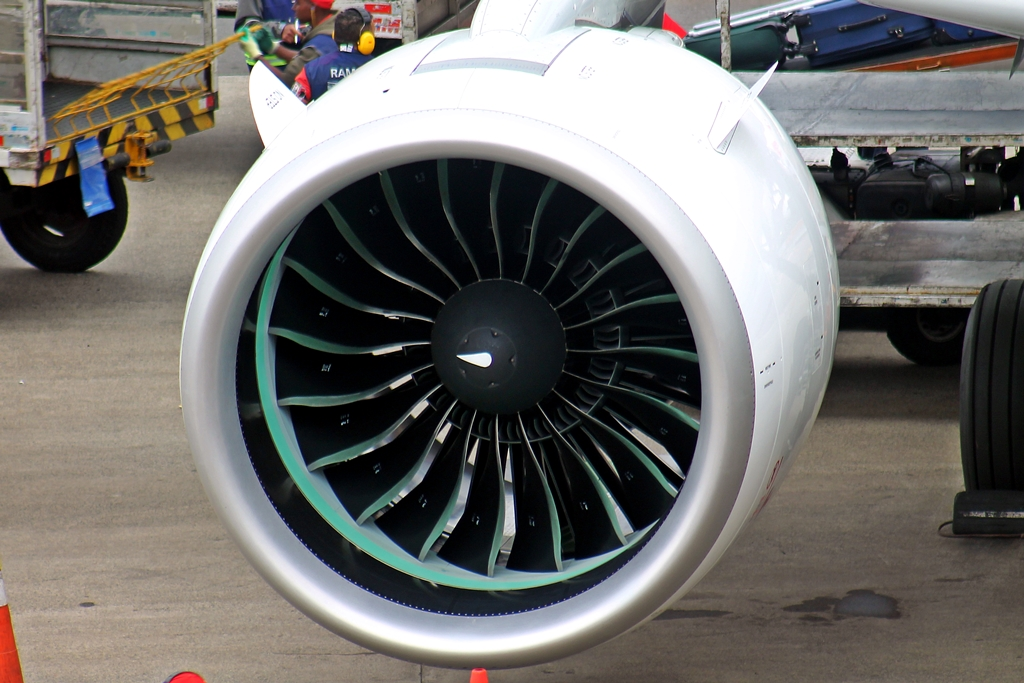
- A PW1100G mounted on an Airbus A320neo
- Type: Geared turbofan
- National origin: United States
- Manufacturer: Pratt & Whitney
- First run: November 2007
- Major applications: Airbus A220; Airbus A320neo family; Embraer E-Jet E2 family
- Status: In production
- Developed from: Pratt & Whitney PW6000

The Pratt & Whitney PW1000G family, also marketed as the Pratt & Whitney GTF (geared turbofan), is a family of high-bypass geared turbofan engines produced by Pratt & Whitney. The various models can generate 15,000 to 33,000 pounds-force (67 to 147 kilonewtons) of thrust. As of 2025, they are used on the Airbus A220, Airbus A320neo family, and Embraer E-Jet E2. They were also used on Yakovlev MC-21s until exports to Russia were stopped in 2022 as part of the international sanctions during the invasion of Ukraine.

Following years of development and testing on various demonstrators, the program officially launched in 2008 with the PW1200G destined for the later-canceled Mitsubishi SpaceJet. The first successful flight test occurred later that year. The PW1500G variant, designed for the A220, became the first certified engine in 2013. P&W is estimated to have spent $10 billion to develop the engine family. The type certificate for the PW1100G is held by International Aero Engines while the other versions are held by Pratt & Whitney.

Unlike traditional turbofan engines whose single shaft forces all components to turn at the same speed, the PW1000G has a gearbox between the fan and the low-pressure core. This allows each section to operate at its optimal speed. Pratt & Whitney says this enables the PW1000G to use 16% less fuel and produce 75% less noise than previous generation engines.

The engine family initially garnered interest from airlines due to its fuel efficiency, but technical problems have hurt its standing in the market. For example, early problems with the PW1100G variant, which powers the A320neo family, grounded aircraft and caused in-flight failures. Some engines were built with contaminated powdered metal, requiring repairs of 250 to 300 days. Some airlines chose the CFM LEAP engine instead.

== Development ==
=== Precursors ===
Wind tunnel tests were conducted at the NASA Glenn Research Center in the late 1980s using Pratt & Whitney’s 17-inch diameter ducted fan model. In summer 1993, Pratt & Whitney started to test its 53,000 lbf (240 kN) Advanced Ducted Propulsor (ADP) demonstrator at the NASA Ames 40–80 ft (12–24 m) Wind Tunnel, using a 4:1, 40,000 hp (30 MW) gearbox. Its 118.2 in (300 cm) fan with 18 reversing pitch composite blades had a 15:1 bypass ratio. It aimed to cut fuel consumption by 6–7%, emissions by 15%, and generate less noise due to lower fan tip speed of 950 ft/s (290 m/s), down from 1,400 ft/s (430 m/s) in conventional 5:1 bypass turbofans. While the gearbox and larger fan weighed more, this was mitigated by using 40% composites by weight, up from 15%. In 1994 P&W was planning to run a 60,000 hp (45 MW) gearbox for 75,000 lbf (330 kN) of thrust. Additional model scale tests of the ADP were conducted in the NASA Glenn 9–15 ft (2.7–4.6 m) Low-Speed Wind Tunnel from 1995 through 1997 to investigate lower fan tip speeds and lower fan pressure ratios.

P&W first attempted to build a production geared turbofan starting around 1998, with the PW8000, targeted for the 25,000–35,000 lbf (110–160 kN) range. This was an upgrade of the existing PW6000 that replaced the fan section with a gear box and a new single-stage fan, which would provide about 90% of the propulsive power of the engine. The PW8000 engine aimed for 10% lower operating costs, or $600,000 per aircraft annually.

The PW8000 had an 11:1 bypass ratio (twice that of the V2500), a 40:1 overall pressure ratio, and 13 rotor stages instead of the 17 in the V2500 for similar thrusts. Preliminary development was to end by June 1, the first test for 10 months later, and certification 20 months after, for $400 million. Pratt had tested gearboxes for 950 hours for $350 million in the previous decade and aimed for 99.5% efficiency. The ADP gearbox was 30% more powerful and the reversing pitch fan was not retained for the PW8000. P&W was to control 60% of the program, shared with IAE partners MTU and FiatAvio but not Rolls-Royce, and possibly with Volvo and MHI.

Its LP turbine ran at 9,160 rpm, reduced by 3:1 for a 3,250 rpm fan having a 1,050 ft/s (320 m/s) blade tip speed down from 1,400 ft/s (430 m/s), dropping noise to 30 EPNdB cumulated below Stage 3 requirements. The 76–79 in (190–200 cm) fan had 20 titanium blades, and moved 1,369 lb (621 kg) of air per second in climb. The conventional 3-stage LP compressor was followed by a 5-stage, 12:1 HP compressor fitted with 700 blades inspired by the military ATEGG program's low aspect-ratio airfoils. A floatwall/TALON combustor was followed by a single stage HP turbine and a counter rotating 3-stage LP turbine with 400 blades, both computational fluid dynamics (CFD) optimized. The gearbox could handle 50 hp/lb (82 kW/kg). The physical size of the gearbox was 17 inches (430 mm) in diameter, or no more than half the gearbox size of the PW-Allison 578-DX propfan demonstrator engine that Pratt & Whitney worked jointly on with Allison in the 1980s. The gearbox consisted of 40 components, weighed 500 lb (230 kg), and shared a 3-U.S.-gallon (11 L) oil tank with the rest of the engine. The efficiency of the gearbox was 99.7%. Eight engines would have been used for certification. After several years, the PW8000 project was abandoned.

Soon afterwards the ATFI project appeared, using a PW308 core but with a new gearbox and a single-stage fan. It had its first run on March 16, 2001. This led to the Geared Turbofan (GTF) program, which was based around a newly designed core jointly developed with German MTU Aero Engines.

=== Geared turbofan (GTF) ===
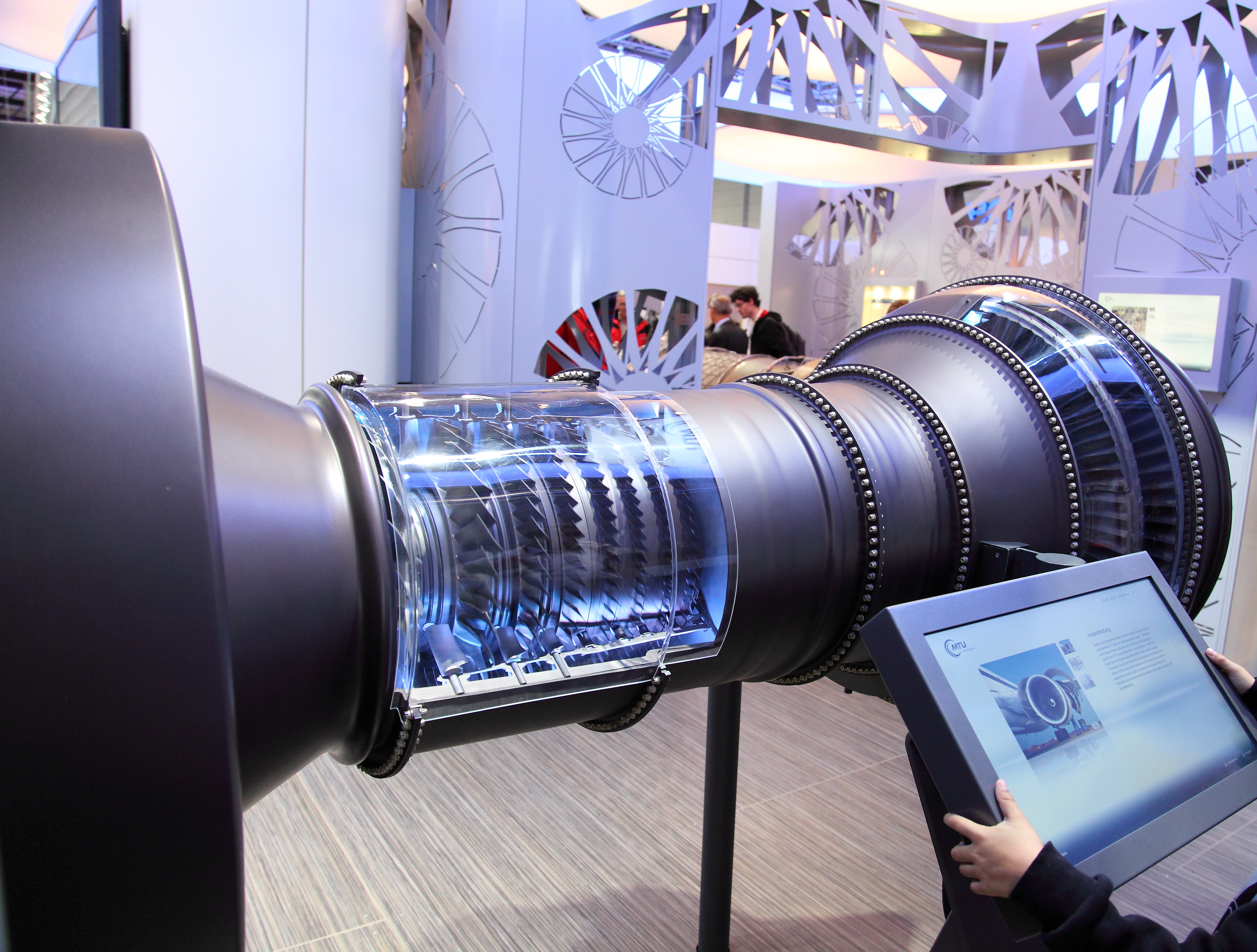
Mockup with compressor and turbine cutaway

By 2006, Pratt & Whitney was spending $100 million per year on geared turbofan development for the next generation of single-aisle airliners, and focusing on the 25,000–35,000 lbf (110–160 kN) thrust range. At the time, P&W was supporting 36% of the engines in the Western-operated commercial fleet, compared to CFM's 33% (growing), GE's 13%, Rolls-Royce's 11%, and IAE's 6% (growing); but it was decreasing as it was mostly based on the older JT8D. The company was hoping the GTF could cut fuel burn by up to 12% and noise by 31 dB compared with then-current engines. P&W was planning a ground engine demonstration in late 2007, aimed at 30,000 lbf (130 kN) thrust with a 2 m (80 in)-diameter fan. The first ground test of the demonstrator was performed in November 2007 at West Palm Beach, Florida.

In October 2007, the GTF was selected to power the 70- to 90-seat Mitsubishi Regional Jet (MRJ). In March 2008, Mitsubishi Heavy Industries launched the MRJ with an order for 25 aircraft from All Nippon Airways, then targeting a 2013 entry into service. In July 2008, the GTF was renamed PW1000G, the first in a new line of "PurePower" engines.

=== Flight testing ===
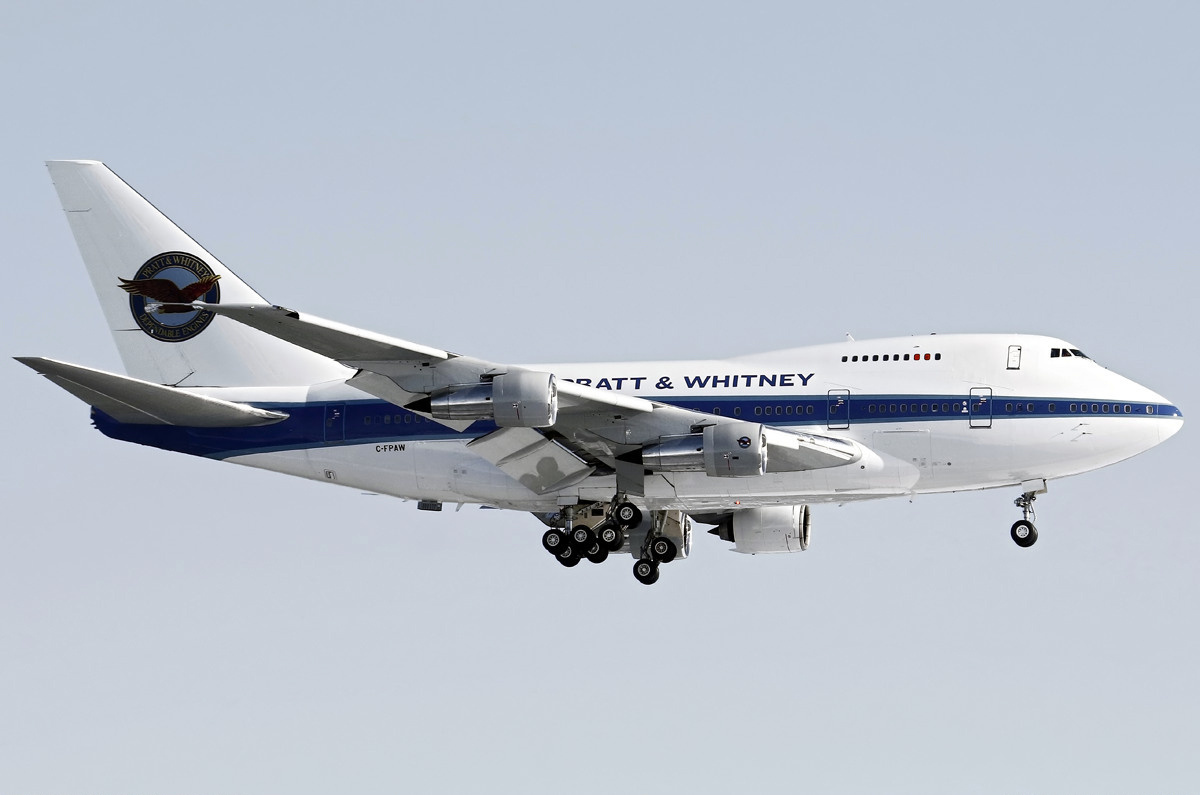
Flight testing on a 747SP, in #2 position

The engine was first tested on the Pratt & Whitney Boeing 747SP on July 11, 2008 through mid-August 2008, totaling 12 flights and 43.5 flight hours. It then flew starting October 14, 2008 on an Airbus A340-600 in Toulouse on the number two pylon.

Testing of the CSeries bound PW1524G model began in October 2010. In addition to the geared turbofan, the initial designs included a variable-area fan nozzle (VAFN), which allows improvements in propulsive efficiency across a range of the flight envelope. However, the VAFN has since been dropped from production designs due to high system weight. The PW1500G engine achieved Transport Canada type certification on February 20, 2013. The first flight test on one of its intended production airframes, the Bombardier CSeries (Airbus A220), was on September 16, 2013.

The A320 engine, the PW1100G, had made its first static engine test run on November 1, 2012, and was first tested on the 747SP on May 15, 2013. The first flight of the Airbus A320neo followed on September 25, 2014. The PW1100G engine achieved FAA type certification on December 19, 2014. The fourth variant of the engine, the PW1900G for the Embraer E2, first flew on November 3, 2015 from Mirabel in Canada fitted to the Boeing 747SP test aircraft.

=== Production ===
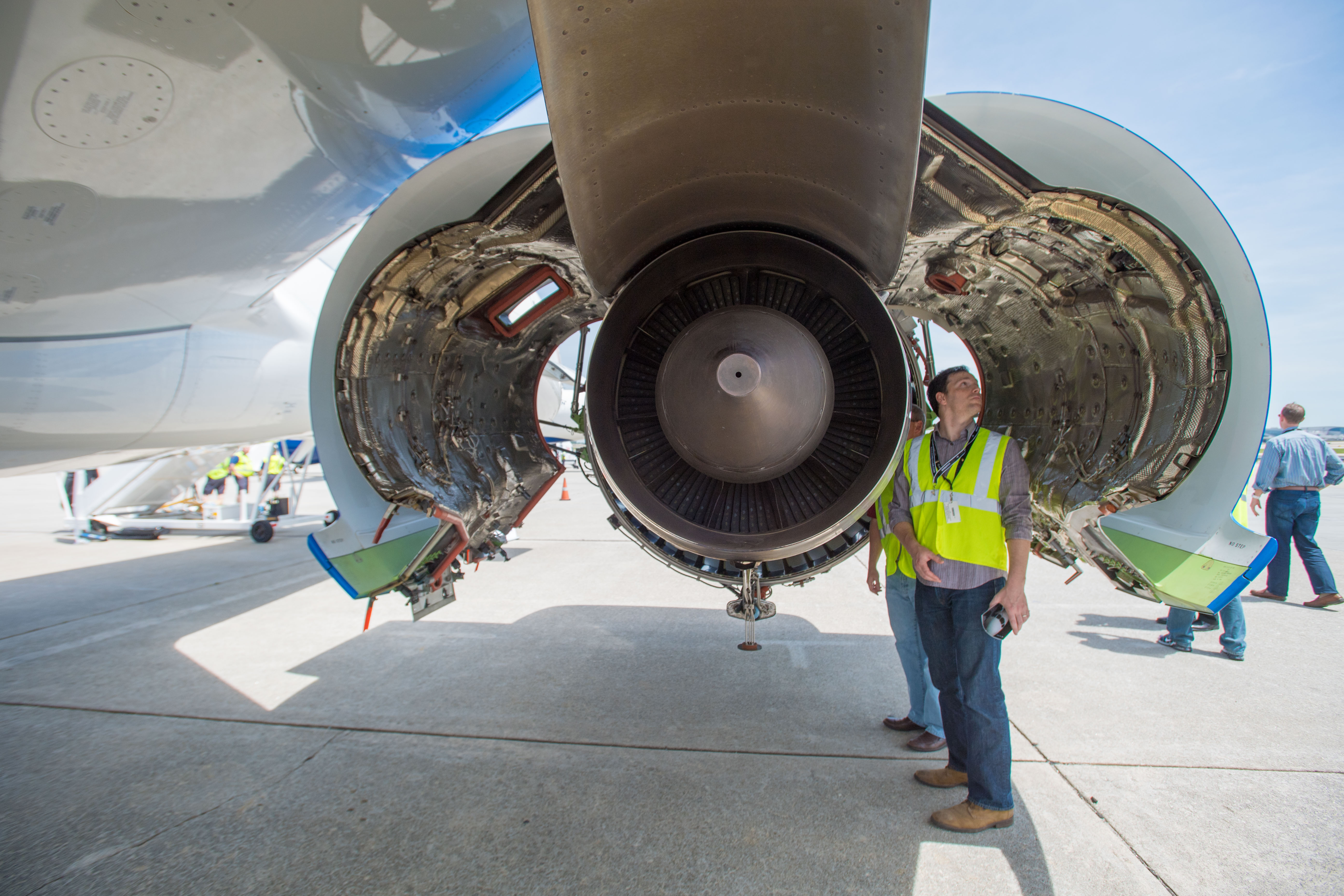
Underneath the wing of an A220 with cowlings open

The program cost is estimated at $10 billion. The list price was $12 million in 2011. At the start of production in 2016, each GTF was costing PW $10m to build, more than the sale price, but was expected eventually to fall below $2 million per engine. MTU provides the first four stages of the high-pressure compressor, the low-pressure turbine and other components. In October 2016, MTU started to deliver the engine assembled on its line to Airbus.

In November 2016, Pratt had fixed the engine-start problem and aimed to deliver 150 powerplants by year's end, 50 fewer than planned. This was because less than one-third of fan blades were passing inspection at the start of the year, a figure that rose to 75% as the year went on. Fuel-burn performance was 16% better than the IAE V2500 baseline, on target, and even 18% better in best cases. The 2017 delivery goal was set at 350 to 400 engines.

The troubled introduction led customers to choose the CFM LEAP, which won 396 A320neo orders compared to 39 for the GTF from January through early August 2017: 46% of the GTF-powered A320neos were out of service for at least one week in July 2017 compared with just 9% of those using the LEAP. The GTF's market share fell from 45% to 40% in 2016, but 1,523 planes (29%) were still undecided, and as of August 2017 Pratt had an 8,000-engine orderbook including 1,000 non-Airbus planes.

On 24 October 2017, a 99.8% dispatch reliability was attained and Pratt remained on track to deliver 350 to 400 engines in 2017, as 254 have been delivered including 120 in the third quarter, but 12–15% were diverted for spares as the carbon air seal and combustor liners were wearing out quickly, requiring engine removals to change the part. P&W expects to deliver over 2,500 GTFs from 2018 to 2020, more than 10,000 engines by 2025.

After 15 PW1200Gs for the Mitsubishi MRJ development were built in Mirabel and Middletown, Mitsubishi Heavy Industries started final assembly in Nagoya in mid 2018 for the MRJ 2020 introduction. Icing, thermal environment, stall, drainage, performance, operability and other development tests were completed. MHI manufactures the combustor and high-pressure turbine disks. The first engine was completed by November 2019.

=== Ultra high-bypass version ===
In 2010, Pratt & Whitney launched the development of an ultra high-bypass version, with a ratio higher than the PW1100G's 12.2:1 for the A320neo, to offer 20% better fuel consumption than a CFM56-7 and 25 dB less noise than the FAA's Stage 4. In 2012, wind tunnel tests were completed on an earlier version of the fan; in 2015, 275 hours of testing were completed on a fan rig. More than 175 hours of ground testing of key components were completed in October 2017, on a shorter duct inlet, a part of the nacelle and a fan with lower-pressure ratio blades, fewer than the 20 blades of the PW1100G. The US FAA Continuous Lower Energy, Emissions and Noise (CLEEN) program sponsors the tests, with its technologies to be validated in a flight test campaign. It could power the Boeing New Midsize Airplane in the mid-2020s and Airbus' response, and would compete against the Rolls-Royce UltraFan and a CFM LEAP higher-thrust version.

=== GTF Advantage (PW1000G/2-JM) ===
In December 2021, Pratt & Whitney announced an updated GTF Advantage version of the A320neo's PW1100G. The said it would offers 1% more fuel efficiency, more durability, and 34,000 lbf (151 kN) of thrust, up to 8% more than before at hot and high airports. These improvements would be achieved by adding flow into the core; tweaking the active clearance control between the turbine and seals, lowering the temperature in the high-pressure compressor; and using better, more durable coatings and damage-resistant blisk rotors. Officials said the new version would need more than a year of ground and flight testing and would become available in 2024. They also said some improvements could trickle down to the other variants.

On 7 October, 2025, the PW1100G/2-JM series engine, also marketed as GTF Advantage, was certified by EASA.

=== PW9000 ===
In 2010, Pratt & Whitney proposed the PW9000 as a family of military engines based on the PW1000G core. One variant was a medium-bypass engine for the Next-Generation Bomber, using a low-pressure section akin to the F135 and the PW1000G core with a direct-drive fan for a 4:1 bypass ratio. The Northrop Grumman B-21 Raider is reputed to be powered by two 27,000 lbf (120 kN) PW9000s. Other proposed members of the PW9000 family include a 15,000 lbf (67 kN)-thrust variant based on the PW1215, offered as a replacement on the Northrop Grumman RQ-4 Global Hawk; and a 30,000 lbf (130 kN)-thrust-class fighter engine variant, offered to replace the company's F100 family.

== Design ==
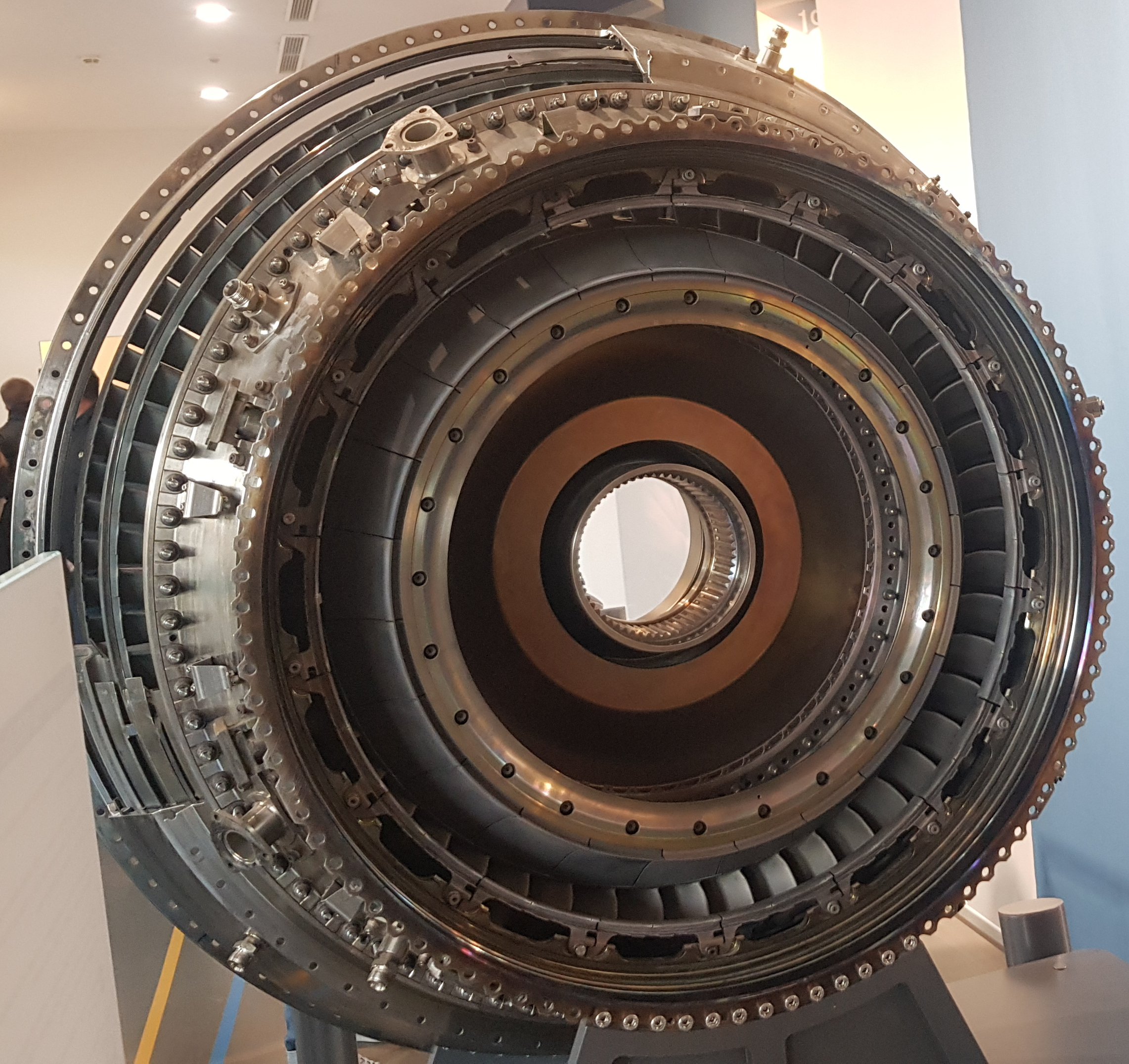
Part of Pratt & Whitney’s PW 1000G Turbofan.

The family of engines generates 15,000 to 34,000 lbf (67 to 151 kN) of thrust, it uses gearboxes rated between 12 MW (16,000 hp) and 24 MW (32,000 hp). By putting a 3:1 gearbox between the fan and the low-pressure spool, each spins at its optimal speed: 4,000–5,000 RPM for the fan and 12,000–15,000 RPM for the spool, the high-pressure spool spinning at more than 20,000 RPM. The PW1431G variant has a compression ratio of 42. As the geared fan is slower, the tensile stresses on the blades are reduced, allowing high-strength aluminum alloys. The A320 PW1100G fan has 20 blades, down from 36 in the CFM56-5B.

Pratt & Whitney claims the PW1000G is 16% more fuel-efficient and up to 75% quieter than engines currently used on regional and single-aisle jets. As the higher bypass ratio and gear create a higher propulsive efficiency, there is less need for a high-performance engine core than the CFM LEAP, leaving a larger fuel burn gain margin of 5–7% over the next decade, averaging 1% per year combined with gear ratio tweaks. The PW1400G has a cruise thrust-specific fuel consumption of 0.51 lb/lbf/h (14.4 g/kN/s).

The 30,000 hp (22 MW) gearbox is designed as a lifetime item with no scheduled maintenance other than changing oil. It has up to 25,000 cycles LLPs, 25% better than others at 20,000 cycles, reducing maintenance costs, while the fan gear has no limit. The fan drive gear system (FDGS) is expected to stay on wing for 30,000 flight hours or more before it needs its first overhaul.

== Operational history ==
=== Introduction ===
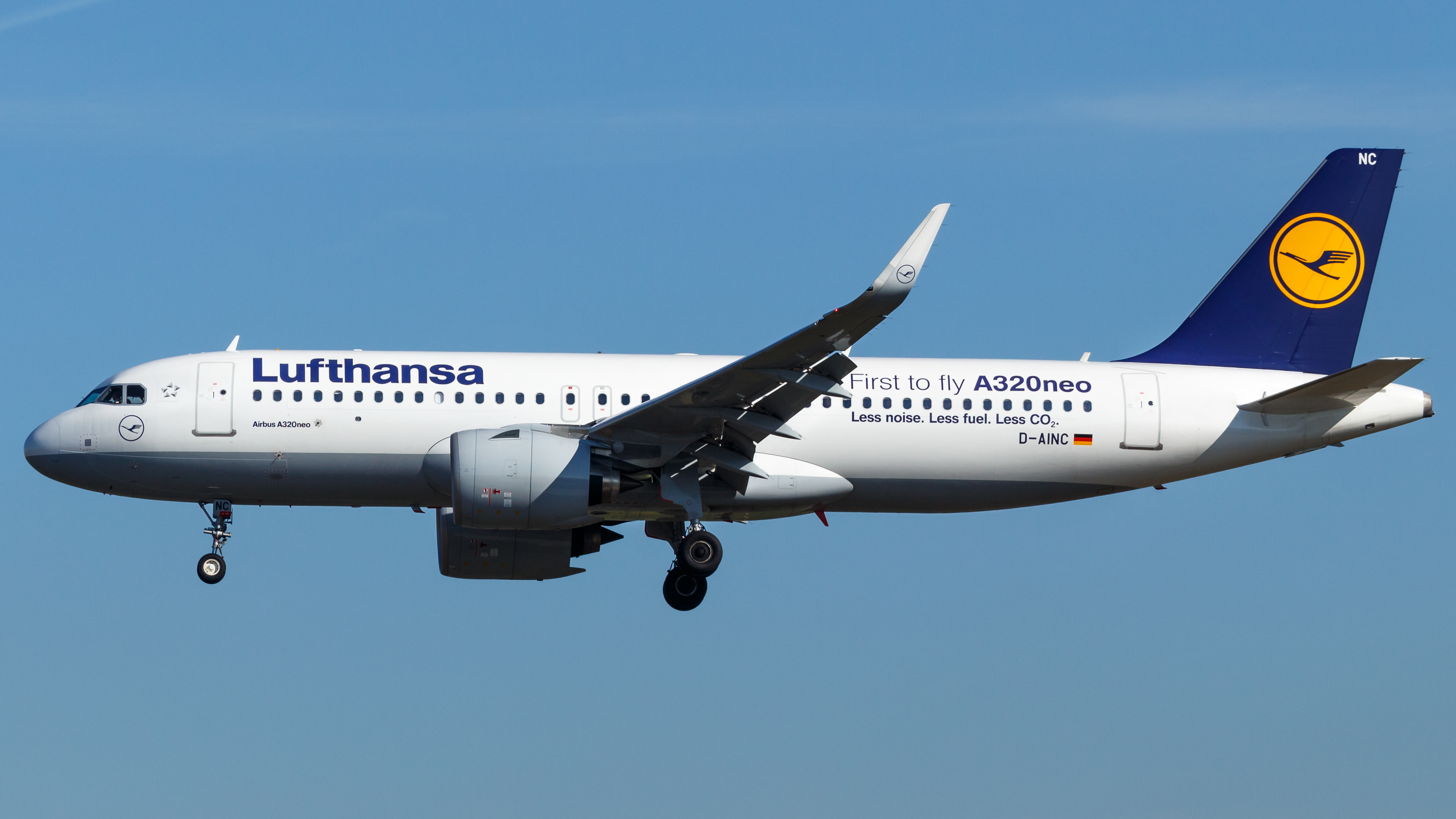
Lufthansa was the first to fly the PW1000G-powered A320neo in early 2016

The first delivery to a commercial operator, an A320neo to Lufthansa, occurred on January 20, 2016. It entered commercial use later that month. As of early August 2017, Pratt was supporting 75 aircraft: 59 Airbus A320neos with PW1100Gs and 16 Airbus A220s with PW1500Gs. In January 2018, it reached 500,000 flight hours on a fleet of 135 aircraft flown by 21 operators. Due to teething problems, overall losses on the GTF program rose to $1.2 billion.

In May 2018, after receiving and operating five A320neos, Spirit Airlines confirms a fuel burn reduction better than the 15% promised, perhaps by 1%–2%. Air Lease Corporation's A320neos deliveries are 11 months late but its executive chairman Steven Udvar-Hazy believes 12–18 months will be needed to get back to normal. On 17 July 2018, Pratt & Whitney announced that the PW1500G had been granted ETOPS 180 approval by the FAA.

=== Starting times ===
The first delivery was to Lufthansa instead of Qatar Airways due to rotor bow, or thermal bowing, due to asymmetrical cooling after shut-down on the previous flight. Differences in temperature across the shaft section supporting the rotor lead to different thermal deformation of the shaft material, causing the rotor axis to bend; this results in an offset between the center of gravity of the bowed rotor and the bearing axis, causing a slight imbalance and potentially reducing the tight clearance between the rotor blade tips and the compressor wall. All production standard engines now feature a damper on the third and fourth shaft bearings to help stiffen the shaft and data from engines in service and under accelerated testing is expected to gradually reduce engine start times. According to P&W President Bob Leduc, "by the time we get to June (2016), it will be down to 200 seconds for start time and by the time we get to December (2016) we will be down to 150 seconds for start time".

In an earnings briefing on 26 July the CEO of Pratt & Whitney's parent company United Technologies Gregory Hayes stated when asked about the start up issues on the PW1100G-JM; "On the technical stuff, I would tell you it is in the rearview mirror. The start time with the software drops have been pretty well addressed". Airbus group chief Tom Enders said while releasing Airbus's 2016 first half financial results that the first upgraded "golden engine" would be delivered to Lufthansa in early August 2016.

Initially, the PW1000G start up sequence took about seven minutes, compared to one to two and a half minute startups on the similar CFM56 and IAE V2500 engines; hardware fixes and software upgrades decreased the time required by a little over a minute, and cooling down both engines at the same time saved slightly over two minutes, for a total reduction of three and a half minutes. These modifications were included on new-build engines, as well as retrofitting existing units. Pratt & Whitney continued to improve start up times, with fuel-nozzle modifications and oil filling procedure changes expected to save another minute when introduced by the end of 2017.

To create a better seal and reduce cooling time by 1 min, a cubic boron nitride coating was applied to the 11 integrally bladed rotors tips: the A321neo production engines start times will be similar to the V2500.

=== Engine removals ===
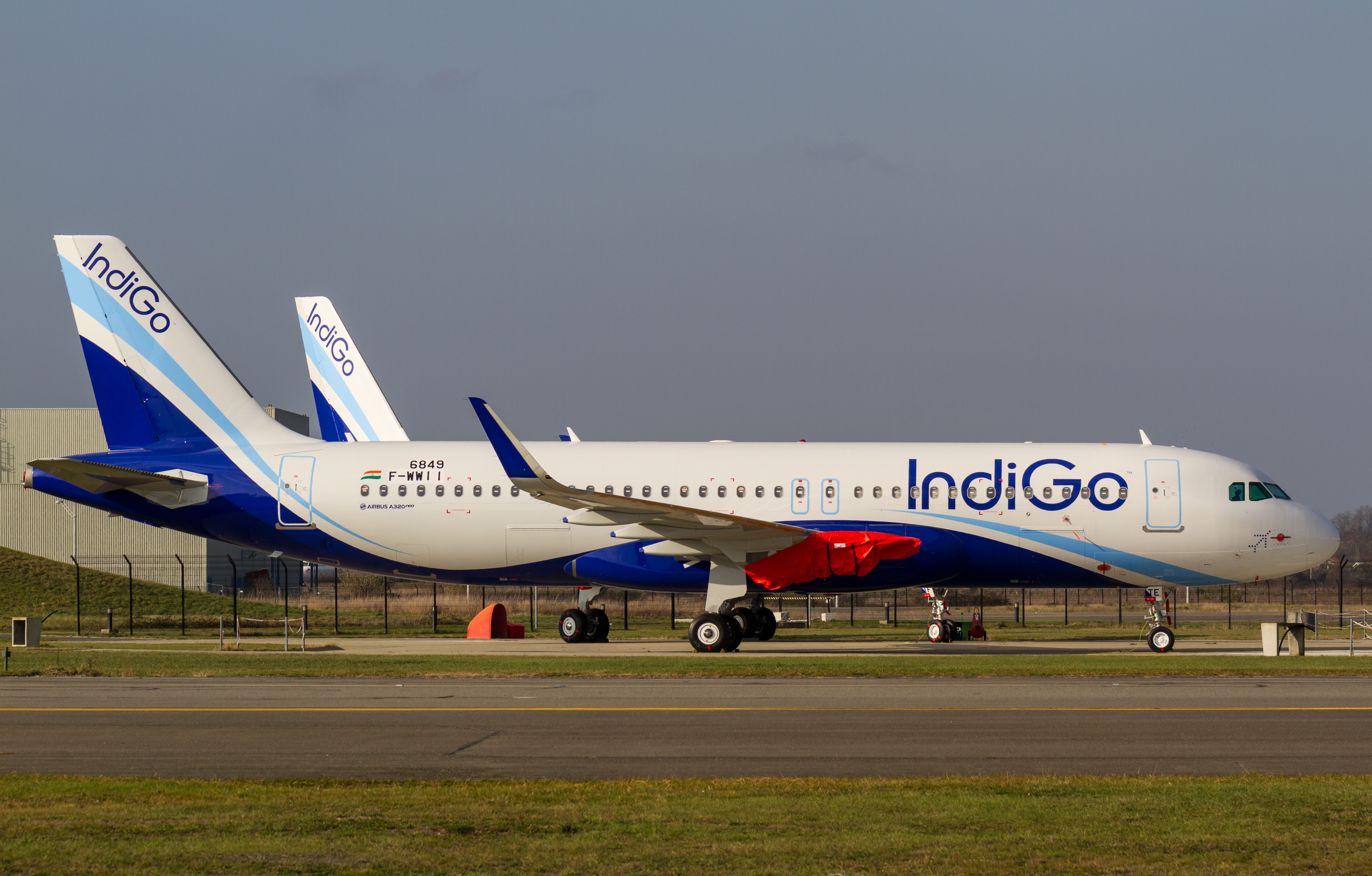
IndiGo A320neo waiting for its engines

As IndiGo and Go Air operate in a humid, hot, polluted and salty environment, 42 engines were prematurely removed from those companies' aircraft by 24 February, with more removals scheduled, after warnings, mandatory checks, and possible repairs were due after only three flight hours instead of ten. 28 engine removals were due to an air seal leakage in the third bearing, which allowed metal particles to enter the oil system, triggering detectors. Pratt & Whitney discovered these issues in 2015 and revised the design in 2016 after the 160th engine with improved bearing compartments and damping for the third and fourth bearings to offset the rotor-bow, with the repairs retrofitted on-wing after testing at Airbus and Pratt. Boosting durability of the third bearing compartment air seal, the upgraded carbon seal package was certified on April 12 and can be retrofitted over a typical night stop.

Thirteen engine removals were due to borescope inspections revealing blocked cooling holes in combustion chamber panels, apparently due to saltier air, and Pratt & Whitney developed and tested a more durable combustor design to address a tone problem, to be introduced in September. Spirit Airlines reported that the bleed air system froze shut on occasion due to cold temperatures on four of its five A320neos, a problem also experienced by IndiGo, leading Spirit to impose a 30,000 feet (9,100 m) ceiling on their aircraft. To avoid troubles with the P&W1100G engines, JetBlue Airways switched its first three Airbus A321neos in 2018 to A321ceos, deferring delivery of its first A321neos to 2019 among its order for 60.

In 2017, IndiGo had to ground seven planes, two in May, four in June and one in July after, their engines out of service, waiting for upgrades: a lack of spare parts—grounding also All Nippon Airways and Hong Kong Express Airways A320s—has been compounded by a new Indian tax on goods and services, impeding imports. With removals without sufficient spare engines available, IndiGo had to ground as many as nine jets on some days. The disruptions to operations were compensated for by Pratt & Whitney which at the time said it would be able to sort out the issues within one and a half years. Indigo had to replace 69 engines from mid 2016 till early 2018.

=== Knife edge seal ===
In February 2018, after in-flight failures of PW1100G with its high pressure compressor aft hub modified – apparently problems of its knife edge seal, the EASA and Airbus grounded some A320neo family aircraft until they are fitted with spares. Later, Airbus decided to stop accepting additional PW1100G engines for A320neo aircraft. Despite the part failure that could hold up engine deliveries to Airbus until April, P&W reaffirmed its 2018 delivery goal of doubling its 2017 rate of 374 engines as nearly 100 engines delivered to Airbus are problematic, including 43 in service.

To solve the issue, a revised configuration with a mature and approved design will be released from early March engine deliveries. The EASA and FAA imposed flying A320neos with mixed engines and forbid ETOPS, but the Indian DGCA went further and grounded all A320neo with an affected engine. The design flaw will cost Pratt & Whitney $50 million to resolve. P&W will replace the seals in the 55 engines delivered to Airbus and in the 43 in-service GTFs, as the target of 750 deliveries in 2018 seems more remote.

=== Engine vibrations ===
By September 2018, the A320neo's PW1100Gs were experiencing increasing engine vibrations, sometimes before 1,000 flight hours and mostly at high power settings in the climb phase, requiring an early engine change. Lufthansa's A320neos were grounded 254 days since first delivery, 13 times worse than for its A320ceos, 78% of the time due to engine issues as 14 unplanned engine changes were made. In September 2018 its A320neos utilization was half of its A320ceos. By the end of November, Airbus planned to explain the root cause and give an in-depth analysis by the end of 2018. Pratt & Whitney stated the A220's and Embraer E2's PW1500G/PW1900Gs are free from the issue and that less than 2% of PW1100Gs are affected while 182 GTF-powered A320/A321neos have been delivered.

The PW1500G's whale-like noise can be heard at the beginning of this video of a JetBlue Airbus A220 taking off from Boston.

In 2018 some PW1500G engines were reported as emitting "a strange howling noise" similar to that of a whale by people below the aircraft as it made its landing approach. Pratt & Whitney had not established what was causing the noise at that time. In a podcast in April 2020, Graham Webb, the Vice President and General Manager of the regional jet geared turbofan engine program at Pratt and Whitney claimed that the engine noise was caused by a "low power transient combustor tone" which generally occurs on approach when the engine is at low or idle power. Under those conditions, the flame front inside the combustor behaves in a way that causes pressure perturbations that interact with the walls of the combustor to create the whale sound. The noise has no repercussions on the operation of the engine.

By October 2018 about 10 P&W-powered A320neos were typically grounded for repairs at any given time.

=== Excessive corrosion ===
Pratt & Whitney has reduced life limits on PW1500G (installed on the Airbus A220) and PW1900G (installed on Embraer E190/E195-E2) high-pressure compressor front hubs after corrosion was discovered during routine engine overhaul. This corrosion reduces the low-cycle fatigue capability and may lead to cracking before the component reaches its life limit.

=== Go First suspension of operations ===
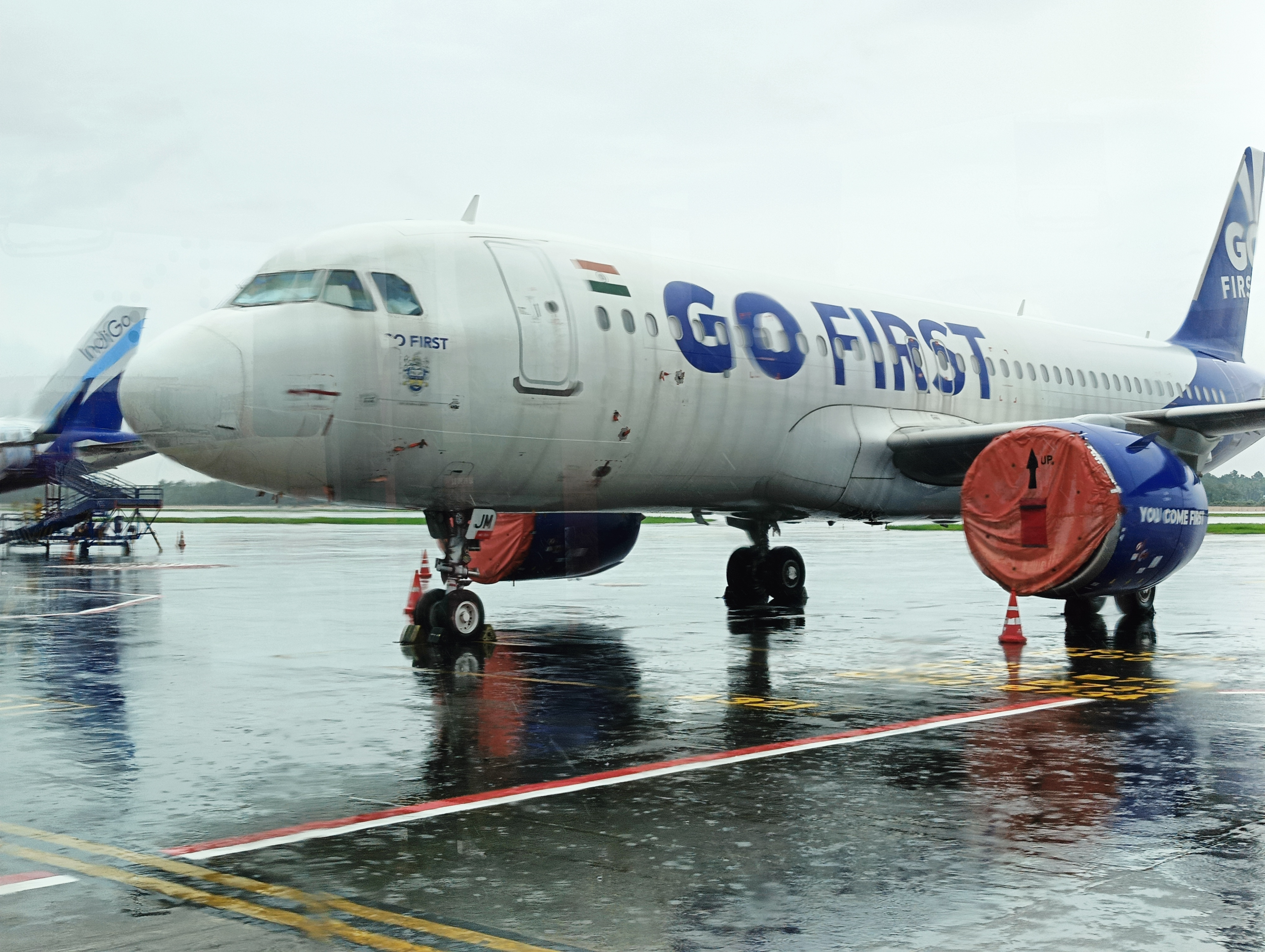
A Go First A320neo being mothballed at Cochin in 2023.

In March 2023 Indian operator Go First (formerly Go Air) suspended operations and filed for bankruptcy, initially until May 2023, later until July 2023. The airline cited poor reliability of the PW1100G engines as reason for suspension and claimed that Pratt & Whitney did not comply with a previous arbitration settlement in the Singapore International Arbitration Centre to supply 5 spare engines per month to Go First between August and December 2023. Pratt & Whitney disputed the claims and said that Go First "had no right" to get new engines because the leases over the aircraft that required engines had been terminated; the lease terminations had happened due to Go First's financial issues caused by Pratt & Whitney's defective engines grounding the fleet.

=== Metal contamination recall ===
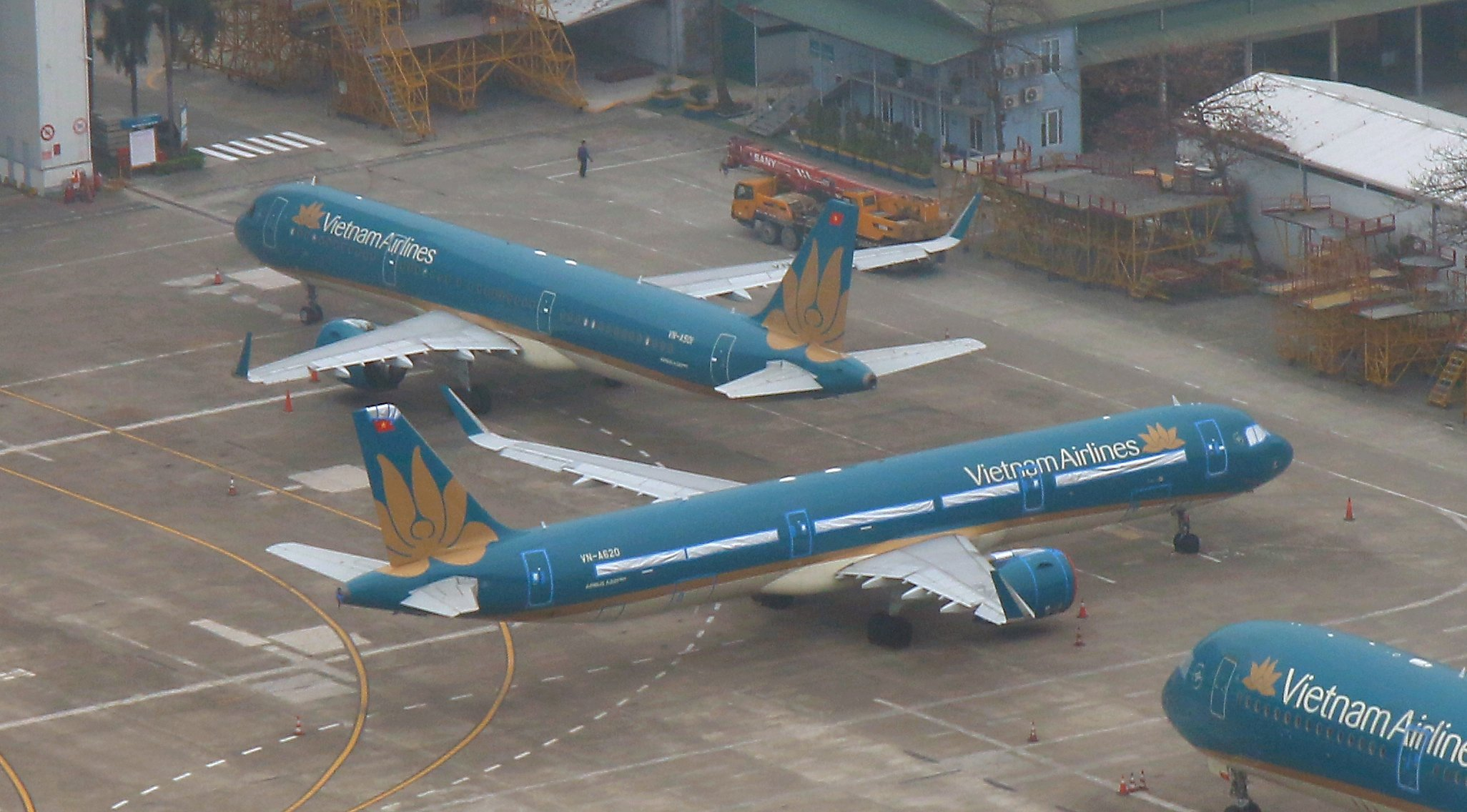
A group of Airbus A321neo serving Vietnam Airlines is being grounded at Noi Bai due to GTF engine issue.

In July 2023 P&W ordered a recall to inspect 1,200 of the 3,000 PW1100G geared turbofan engines used on the A320neo due to the discovery that contaminated powdered metal was used in production of some engine parts. The inspections led to the discovery of cracked parts. In September 2023, P&W expanded this recall to include all 3,000 engines. P&W says the inspections take 250 to 300 days to complete, and the company said it expected an average of 350 airplanes to be on the ground through 2026 with the highest number coming in early 2024. P&W estimated that the metal contamination issue will cost Pratt & Whitney and its partners $6 to $7 billion, 80% of which is customer compensation.

=== In-flight failures ===
==== PW1100G failures ====
Indian airline IndiGo reported four incidents involving in-flight engine stall during climb followed by shutdown, which occurred on the 24th, 25th and 26 October 2019. The cause of the shutdowns has been traced to problems with the Low-Pressure Turbine (LPT). On 1 November 2019 the Indian Directorate General of Civil Aviation (DGCA) asked IndiGo to replace engines on all of the 98 A320neo airplanes it currently operates by January 31, 2020 and suggested to defer future deliveries until the existing fleet is re-engined. Later DGCA extended the deadline to May 31, 2020.

==== PW1500G failures ====
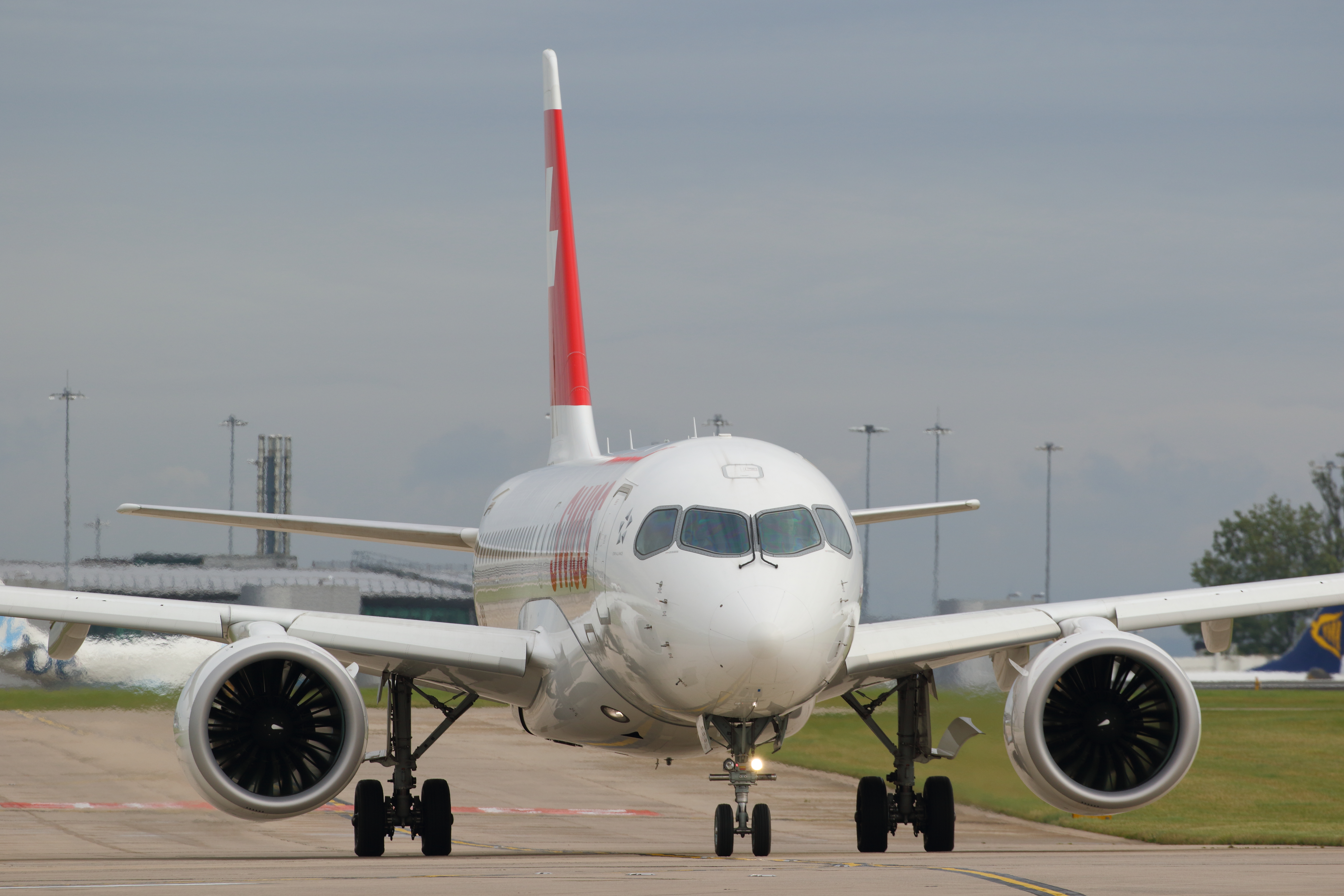
The PW1500G powers the Airbus A220 of Swiss International Air Lines

On 13 October 2018, an Airbus A220-100 operated by Swiss International Air Lines had an inflight shutdown of one of its PW1500G engines after a faulty O-ring seal on the engine's fuel oil cooler led to a loss of oil pressure.

On 25 July 2019, an Airbus A220-300 operated by Swiss International Air Lines had an engine failure and diverted to Paris–Charles de Gaulle. The low-pressure compressor of one its PW1500G engines disintegrated while climbing through 32,000 ft.

On 16 September 2019, a similar accident happened just before reaching 35,000 ft and the crew returned to Geneva. The inspection has shown that "stage-one rotor in the low-pressure compressor had separated and there was a hole in the compressor case". On 26 September the FAA issued an Airworthiness Directive mandating borescope inspections on the engines.

On 15 October 2019, another engine failed and the crew diverted to Paris-Charles de Gaulle, after which Swiss withdrew its fleet for inspection. Swiss returned some aircraft to flight status the same day after engine checks and planned to restore flight operations by 17 October. A software update may have caused damaging vibrations of fast-moving parts, leading to the failures.

After those engine failures, Transport Canada issued an emergency airworthiness directive limiting the power to 94% of N1 (low pressure spool) above 29,000 ft (8,800 m), disengaging the autothrottle for the climb over this altitude before engaging it again in cruise. For the PW1500G, N1 is the Low Pressure Spool, with a nominal speed of 10,600 RPM, with the fan geared with a ratio of 1:3.0625 (nominal speed 3461 RPM). The top of climb is the most demanding point for a turbofan, where the compressor spins the fastest. The directive states that "high altitude climbs at higher thrust settings for engines with certain thrust ratings" may be a contributor to the failures, and cautions that "this condition, if not corrected, could lead to an uncontained failure of the engine and damage to the aeroplane". The EASA adopted the directive, and others are expected to follow.

The engines involved in the July and September incidents had 154 and 230 cycles, respectively, while the October failure occurred to an engine with 1,654 cycles since new but within 300 cycles after an electronic engine-control update. Pratt & Whitney recommends inspections on engines with up to 300 cycles after the update.

On 12 February 2020, another PW1500G suffered an uncontained engine failure on an A220-300 belonging to Latvia's airBaltic during flight BT-677 from Riga, Latvia to Malaga, Spain.

Following these Airbus A220 PW1500G failures, the similar PW1900G electronic control software was upgraded for the Embraer E195-E2 in 2021.

To address the issue for the PW1500G, Pratt & Whitney developed a software update for the engine control system that was specifically designed to improve engine performance during all flight operations. The update was first approved by the FAA in March 2019, and was subsequently incorporated into the engines of a number of Airbus A220 aircraft. The software update addressed the root cause of the compression stall problem by adjusting the engine's control logic to provide more consistent and stable airflow through the engine core. This was achieved by optimizing the engine's inlet guide vanes and airflow sensors, as well as altering the engine's response to certain flight conditions.

Pratt & Whitney also conducted a comprehensive review of the PW1500G engine and its components to identify any other potential issues. Extensive testing and data analysis have resulted in further modifications to the engine's design and performance characteristics.

As of June 2023, there have been no other reported incidents of compression stalls on PW1500G-powered aircraft since the software update was implemented.

On 23 December 2024, an Airbus A220-300, operating as Swiss International Air Lines Flight 1885 experienced an engine failure at FL400, leading to smoke entering the cabin and forcing the aircraft to divert to Graz Airport. Of the 79 occupants, 1 died and 21 were injured.

== Applications ==
- Airbus A220: PW1500G (exclusive)
- Airbus A320neo: PW1100G (alongside the CFM International LEAP-1A)
- Embraer E-Jet E2 family : PW1700G & PW1900G (exclusive)
- Mitsubishi SpaceJet: PW1200G (exclusive), project canceled
- Yakovlev MC-21: PW1400G (used in six test aircraft only; replaced with the Aviadvigatel PD-14 due to sanctions)

Before sanctions, it was proposed for the Russian SJ-130. It has also been proposed for the Rekkof Aircraft F-120NG.

== Specifications ==
The PW1000G Family
Program (Note: The first digit of the program or model number indicates the generation (1 for this engine family). The second digit represents the customer (1 for Airbus, 2 for Mitsubishi, 4 for Irkut, and 5 for ex-Bombardier). The last two digits denote the nominal thrust in kilopounds of a model. (The digits "00" just represent the overall engine program, not a particular thrust model.) The suffix "G" indicates a geared turbofan engine.)	PW1100G	PW1400G	PW1500G	PW1900G	PW102XG	PW1700G	PW1200G
Fan Diameter	81 in (206 cm), 20 blades		73 in (185 cm), 18 blades			56 in (142 cm), 18 blades	
Bypass ratio	12.5:1	12:1	12.5:1	12:1		9:1	
Static Thrust	24,000–35,000 lbf (110–160 kN)	28,000–31,000 lbf (120–140 kN)	19,000–23,300 lbf (85–104 kN)	17,000–23,000 lbf (76–102 kN)	24,000 lbf (107 kN)	15,000–17,000 lbf (67–76 kN)	15,000 lbf (67 kN)
Compressor	Axial flow, 1 geared fan, 3 stage LPC, 8 stage HPC					Axial flow, 1 geared fan, 2 stage LPC, 8 stage HPC	
Combustor	Talon-X Lean-Burn Combustor						
Turbine	Axial flow, 2-stage HP, 3-stage LP						
Application	A320neo family	Yakovlev MC-21	A220 family	E-Jet E2 190/195	X-66	E-Jet E2 175	SpaceJet M90/M100
Service entry	25 January 2016	Likely cancelled (Note: Exports of the engine have been indefinitely halted as a result of the international sanctions during the Russian invasion of Ukraine.)	15 July 2016	24 April 2018	–	–	Cancelled
Length (Note: fan spinner face to aft flange)	133.9 in (3.401 m)		125.4 in (3.184 m)			113.5 in (2.88 m)	
Fan case diameter	87.6 in (2,230 mm)		79 in (2,000 mm)			62 in (1,600 mm)	
Weight	6,300 lb (2,858 kg)		4,800 lb (2,177 kg)			3,800 lb (1,724 kg)	
Takeoff thrust	30/33G: 33,110 lbf (147.28 kN); 27G: 27,075 lbf (120.43 kN); 24/22G: 24,240 lbf (107.82 kN)	31,572 lbf (140.39 kN)	19G: 19,775 lbf (87.96 kN); 21G: 21,970 lbf (97.73 kN); 24/25G: 24,400 lbf (108.54 kN)	19G: 20,860 lbf / 92.79 kN; 21G: 22,550 lbf / 100.31 kN; 22/23G: 23,815 lbf / 105.93 kN			19,190 lbf (85.4 kN)
Thrust-to-weight ratio	3.85 – 5.26	5.01	4.12 – 5.08	4.35 – 4.96		5.05	
Max. LP Rotor speed	10,047 RPM		10,600 RPM			12,680 RPM	
Max. Fan speed	3,281 RPM		3,461 RPM			5,264 RPM	
Max. HP Rotor speed	22,300 RPM		24,470 RPM			25,160 RPM	

== See also ==
Related development

- Pratt & Whitney/Allison 578-DX
- Pratt & Whitney PW6000
- Pratt & Whitney Canada PW800

Comparable engines

- ACAE CJ-1000A
- Aviadvigatel PD-14
- CFM International LEAP

Related lists

- List of aircraft engines
