= Engineering apprentice =

An engineering apprenticeship in the United Kingdom is an apprenticeship in mechanical engineering or electrical engineering or aeronautical engineering to train craftsmen, technicians, senior technicians, Incorporated Engineers and Chartered Engineer for vocational oriented work and professional practice. Chartered Engineers are usually formed through a university degree programme at the Masters Engineering level and may undertake a short form of post graduate apprenticeship. A typical example is the apprenticeships formerly available at the British Thomson-Houston and English Electric companies at Rugby in England. Subjects covered included mathematics, engineering sciences, limits and fits, metallurgy, foundry technology, engineering drawing, design, materials science for engineering materials, metalworking by hand, operating machine tools, and basic features of engineering design. Also refer to apprenticeship and the UK and German section. Elite technical apprenticeships (4-6 years long) have been a decades long tradition at UK companies such as BAE Systems, Rolls-Royce Holdings, Bombardier Aerospace (Short Brothers), and Babcock International.
