= Pratt & Whitney PW6000 =

Turbofan aircraft engine

PW6000
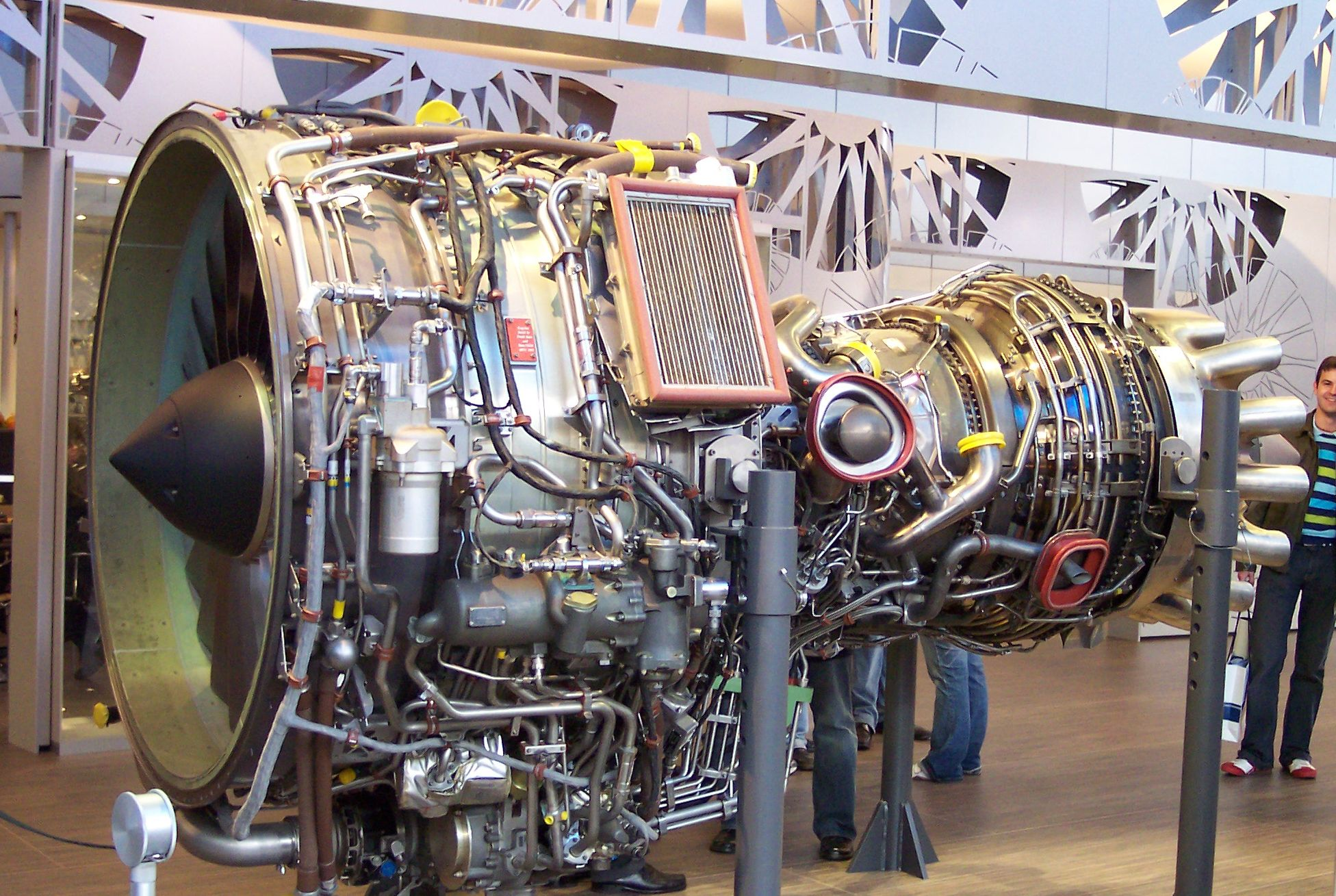
- Type: Turbofan
- National origin: United States
- Manufacturer: Pratt & Whitney
- First run: 21 August 2000
- Major applications: Airbus A318
- Status: Withdrawn from service
- Developed from: Pratt & Whitney PW2000
- Developed into: Pratt & Whitney PW1000G

The Pratt & Whitney PW6000 is a retired high-bypass turbofan jet engine designed for the Airbus A318 with a design thrust range of 18,000–24,000 lbf (80–107 kN). Due to disappointing performance, this engine was a commercial failure and all airframes being powered by PW6000 have been retired by 2019.

== Design and development ==
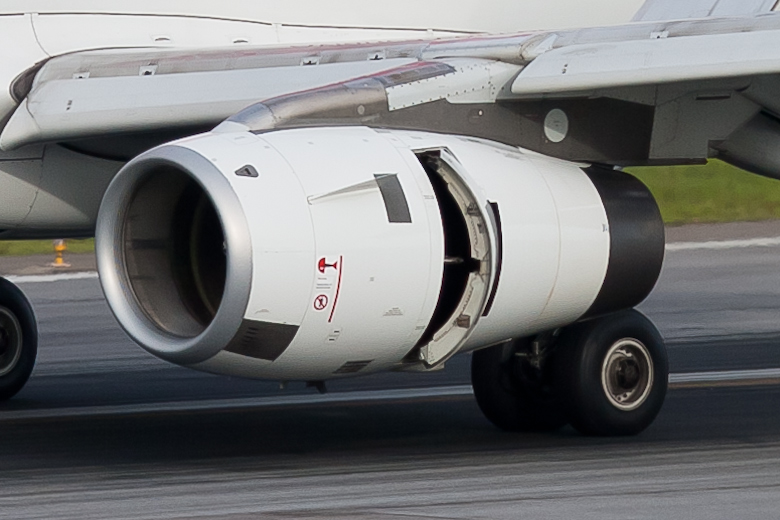
PW6000 with thrust reverser deployed on an Avianca A318.

Pratt & Whitney designed the engine with minimum complexity to significantly reduce maintenance costs and achieve weight and fuel consumption savings. This initial design used a five-stage high-pressure compressor. However, tests revealed that the engine did not meet promised fuel burn performance. As a result, many of the original customers switched their orders to the rival CFM56-5. To address the problem, Pratt & Whitney certified an updated design using a six-stage high-pressure compressor designed by MTU Aero Engines in order to achieve promised performance. MTU manufactured the high-pressure compressor and the low-pressure turbine. The HP compressor is driven by a single-stage turbine. On the LP spool a three-stage turbine drives a single-stage fan and a four-stage LP compressor.

The engine made its first flight August 21, 2000 on a test aircraft flown from Plattsburgh International Airport (KPBG), successfully completing a 1-hour-20-minute flight. The engine final assembly line is located at MTU Aero Engines at their location in Hanover, Germany.

LAN Airlines confirmed an order for 15 Airbus A318 aircraft, for a total of 34 engines (30 installed and 4 spares) powered by PW-6000 engines on 15 August 2005. In addition, LAN signed with Pratt and Whitney to power up to 25 option aircraft. If LAN exercises all options it would mean an additional 56 (50 installed and six spare) engines.

Prior to the LAN order, 84 CFM56-5 powered Airbus A318 aircraft had been ordered, with 28 in service as of December 2005.

== Applications ==
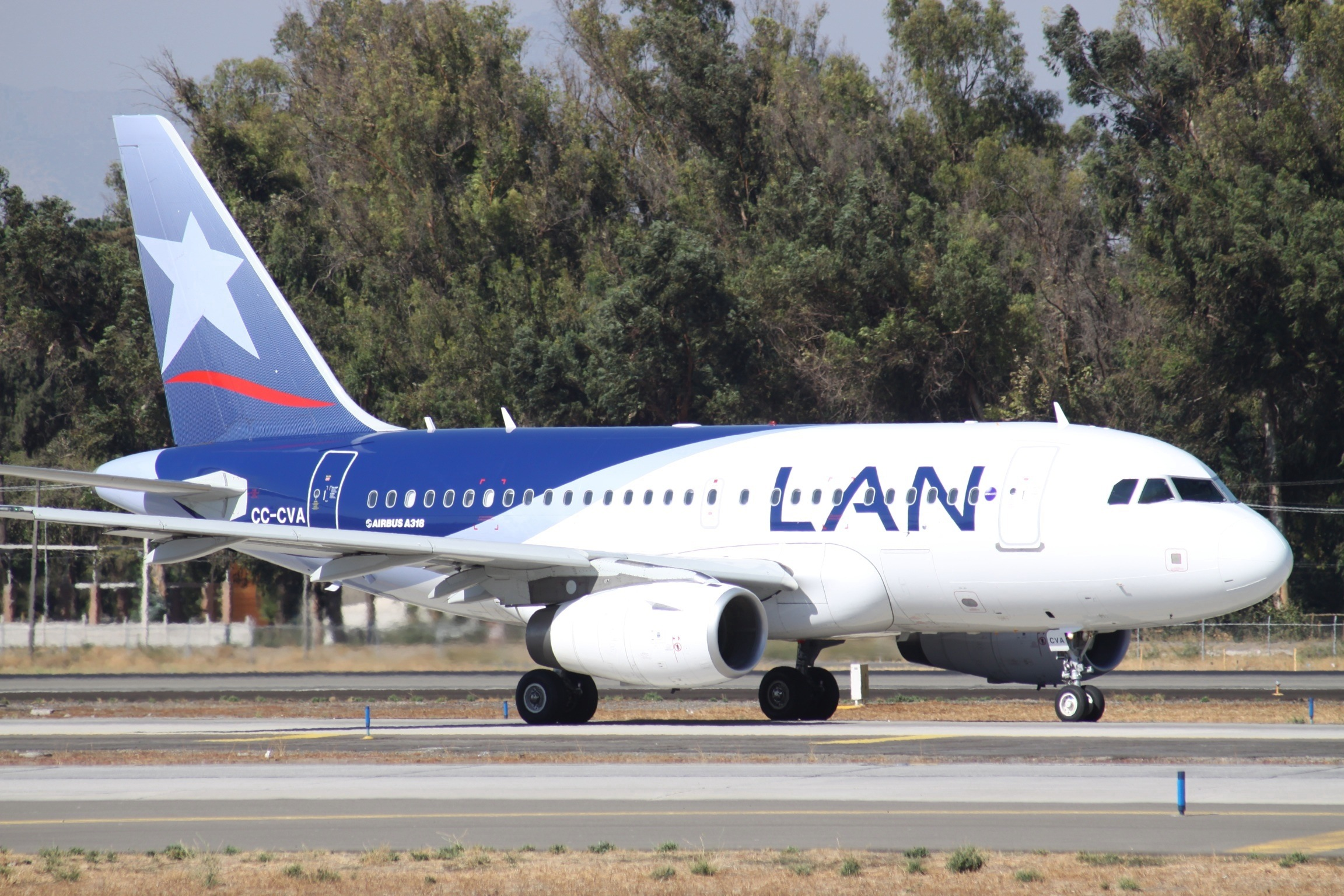
A PW6000-equipped Airbus A318 of LAN.

- Airbus A318

== Specifications ==
Data from

==== General characteristics ====
- Type: Two-spool high-bypass turbofan
- Length: 108 in (2.7 m)
- Diameter: 56.5 in (1.44 m)
- Dry weight: 5,046 lb (2,289 kg)

==== Components ====
- Compressor: Axial, single stage fan, four stage LP compressor, six stage HP compressor
- Combustors: Annular
- Turbine: Axial, single stage HP turbine, three stage LP turbine

==== Performance ====
- Maximum thrust: 22,100–23,800 lbf (98–106 kN)
- Overall pressure ratio: 26.1 - 28.2:1
- Bypass ratio: 4.8 - 5.0:1
- Thrust-to-weight ratio: 4.7

== See also ==
Related development

- Pratt & Whitney PW1000G

Comparable engines

- CFM International CFM56
- General Electric CF34
- IAE V2500
- PowerJet SaM146
- Progress D-436
- Rolls-Royce BR700

Related lists

- List of aircraft engines
