= Allowance (engineering) =

Planned deviation from an ideal dimension

In engineering and machining, an allowance is a planned deviation between an exact dimension and a nominal or theoretical dimension, or between an intermediate-stage dimension and an intended final dimension. The unifying abstract concept is that a certain amount of difference allows for some known factor of compensation or interference. For example, an area of excess metal may be left because it is needed to complete subsequent machining. Common cases are listed below. An allowance, which is a planned deviation from an ideal, is contrasted with a tolerance, which accounts for expected but unplanned deviations.

Allowance is basically the size difference between components that work together. Allowance between parts that are assembled is very important. For example, the axle of a car has to be supported in a bearing otherwise it will fall to the ground. If there was no gap between the axle and the bearing then there would be a lot of friction and it would be difficult to get the car to move. If there was too much of a gap then the axle would be jumping around in the bearing. It is important to get the allowance between the axle and the bearing correct so that the axle rotates smoothly and easily without juddering.

== Examples of engineering and machining allowances ==
- Outer dimensions (such as the length of a bar) may be cut intentionally oversize, or inner dimensions (such as the diameter of a hole) may be cut intentionally undersize, to allow for a predictable dimensional change following future cutting, grinding, or heat-treating operations. For example:
  - the outer diameter of a pin may be ground to 0.0005 inches (0.013 mm) oversize because it is known that subsequent heat-treatment of the pin is going to cause it to shrink by 0.0005 inches (0.013 mm).
  - A hole may be drilled 0.012 inches (0.30 mm) undersize to allow for the material that will be removed by subsequent reaming.
- Outer dimensions (such as the diameter of a railroad car's axle) may be cut intentionally oversize, or inner dimensions (such as the diameter of the railroad car's wheel hub) may be cut intentionally undersize, to allow for an interference fit (press fit).
- A part may be cast intentionally too big when it is desired to later machine the surface. This ensures that the roughness that the casting process leaves is removed, and a smooth machined surface is produced. This machining allowance may be e.g. 1mm, but this depends on the size of the part and the accuracy of the casting process.
- A chain segment may be oversized so that at the end of its useful service life (around 20 years), the corroded chain is still above the minimum diameter required to meet the minimum break strength. This is called a corrosion allowance and accounts for the steel molecules lost through oxidation, erosion and wear, and microbially influenced corrosion.

== Confounding of the engineering concepts of allowance and tolerance ==
Often the terms allowance and tolerance are used inaccurately and are improperly interchanged in engineering contexts. This is because both words generally can relate to the abstract concept of permission — that is, of a limit on what is acceptable. However, in engineering, separate meanings are enforced, as explained below.

- A tolerance is the expected limit of acceptable unintended deviation from a nominal or theoretical dimension. Therefore, a pair of tolerances, upper and lower, defines a range within which an actual dimension may fall while still being acceptable.

In contrast,

- an allowance is a planned deviation from the nominal or theoretical dimension. In other words, it is an intended difference between the maximum material conditions of mating parts.

=== Example ===
An example of the concept of tolerance is that a shaft for a machine is intended to be precisely 10 mm in diameter: 10 mm is the nominal dimension. The engineer designing the machine knows that in reality, the grinding operation that produces the final diameter may introduce a certain small-but-unavoidable amount of random error. Therefore, the engineer specifies a tolerance of ±0.01 mm ("plus-or-minus" 0.01 mm).

As long as the grinding machine operator can produce a shaft with actual diameter somewhere between 9.99 mm and 10.01 mm, the shaft is acceptable. Understanding how much error is predictable in a process and how much is easily avoidable; how much is unavoidable (or whose avoidance is possible but simply too expensive to justify); and how much is truly acceptable involves considerable judgment, intelligence, and experience.

An example of the concept of allowance can be shown in relation to the hole that this shaft must enter. It is evident that the above shaft cannot be certain to freely enter a hole that is also 10 mm with the same tolerance. It might, if the actual shaft diameter is 9.99 mm and the actual hole diameter is 10.01 mm, but it would not if conversely the actual shaft diameter is 10.01 mm and the actual hole diameter is 9.99 mm.

To be sure that there will be enough clearance between the shaft and its hole, taking account of the tolerance, an allowance is intentionally introduced in the dimensions specified. The hole diameter might be specified as 10.03 mm with a manufacturing tolerance of ±0.01 mm ("plus-or-minus" 0.01 mm). This means that the smallest acceptable hole diameter will be 10.02 mm while the largest acceptable shaft diameter will be 10.01 mm, leaving an "allowance" of 0.01 mm. The minimum clearance between the hole and the shaft will then be 0.01 mm. This will occur when both the shaft and the hole are at maximum material condition.
