= Rolls-Royce/JAEC RJ500 =

RJ500
- Type: Turbofan
- Manufacturer: Rolls-Royce; Japanese Aero Engines Corporation
- Number built: 2

The Rolls-Royce/JAEC RJ500 was a 20,000 lbf (89 kN) civil turbofan which Rolls-Royce and the Japanese Aero Engine Corporation (JAEC) consortium hoped to develop for aircraft like the Boeing 737-300 and the McDonnell Douglas MD-80.

A single-stage fan, driven by a three-stage LP turbine, supercharged the nine-stage HP compressor, which was driven by a two-stage air-cooled HP turbine. The combustor was annular and the exhaust separate jets. The HP compressor was based on a scale-up of the Rolls-Royce RB401 HP compressor, with a ninth stage added at the rear. Fan diameter was restricted to 60 in (1,524 mm), because of the relatively short undercarriage of the 737. Even then, the engine nacelle required an oblate shape so as to improve ground clearance.

Although two prototype engines were built and ground tested, the project was cancelled in the early 1980s.

== Specifications (RJ500) ==
Data from Rolls-Royce Aero Engines

==== General characteristics ====
- Type: Turbofan
- Length: 101 in (2,571 mm)
- Diameter: 59 in (1,499 mm) (fan)
- Dry weight: 4,081 lb (1,851 kg)

==== Components ====
- Compressor: Single-stage fan, nine-stage HP
- Combustors: Annular
- Turbine: Three-stage LP, two-stage HP

==== Performance ====
- Maximum thrust: 20,000 lbf (89 kN)
- Air mass flow: 635 lb/s (288 kg/s)
- Thrust-to-weight ratio: 4.9:1

== See also ==
Related lists

- List of aircraft engines
