= International Aero Engines =

Japanese-German-Swiss-American aerospace joint venture

- Type: Joint venture
- Industry: Aerospace
- Founded: 1983; 43 years ago
- Headquarters: East Hartford, Connecticut, United States
- Products: Aircraft engines
- Owners: Pratt & Whitney (61%); MTU Aero Engines (16%); Japanese Aero Engine Corporation (23%)
- Website: links.prattwhitney.com/i-a-e/

IAE International Aero Engines AG is a Zürich-registered joint venture aeroengine manufacturing company.

IAE was founded during 1983 specifically to develop an aircraft engine to address the 150-seat single aisle aircraft market, the V2500 turbofan. Produced in collaboration between four of the world's leading aero engine manufacturers, this engine has become the second most successful commercial jet engine program in production today in terms of volume, and the third most successful commercial jet engine program in aviation history. At one stage, IAE was also engaged in the development of the SuperFan, a geared turbofan derived from the V2500; however, work on this project was terminated during the late 1980s. During 2011, an extension agreement was signed between the partner nations to continue to participate in IAE through to 2045.

== History ==
The original collaboration involved Pratt & Whitney of the United States, Rolls-Royce plc of the United Kingdom, Japanese Aero Engine Corporation of Japan and MTU Aero Engines of Germany. FiatAvio withdrew as a shareholder of the program early on, but the now-renamed Avio still remains as a supplier. The "V" product nomenclature remains as a legacy of the five original shareholders.

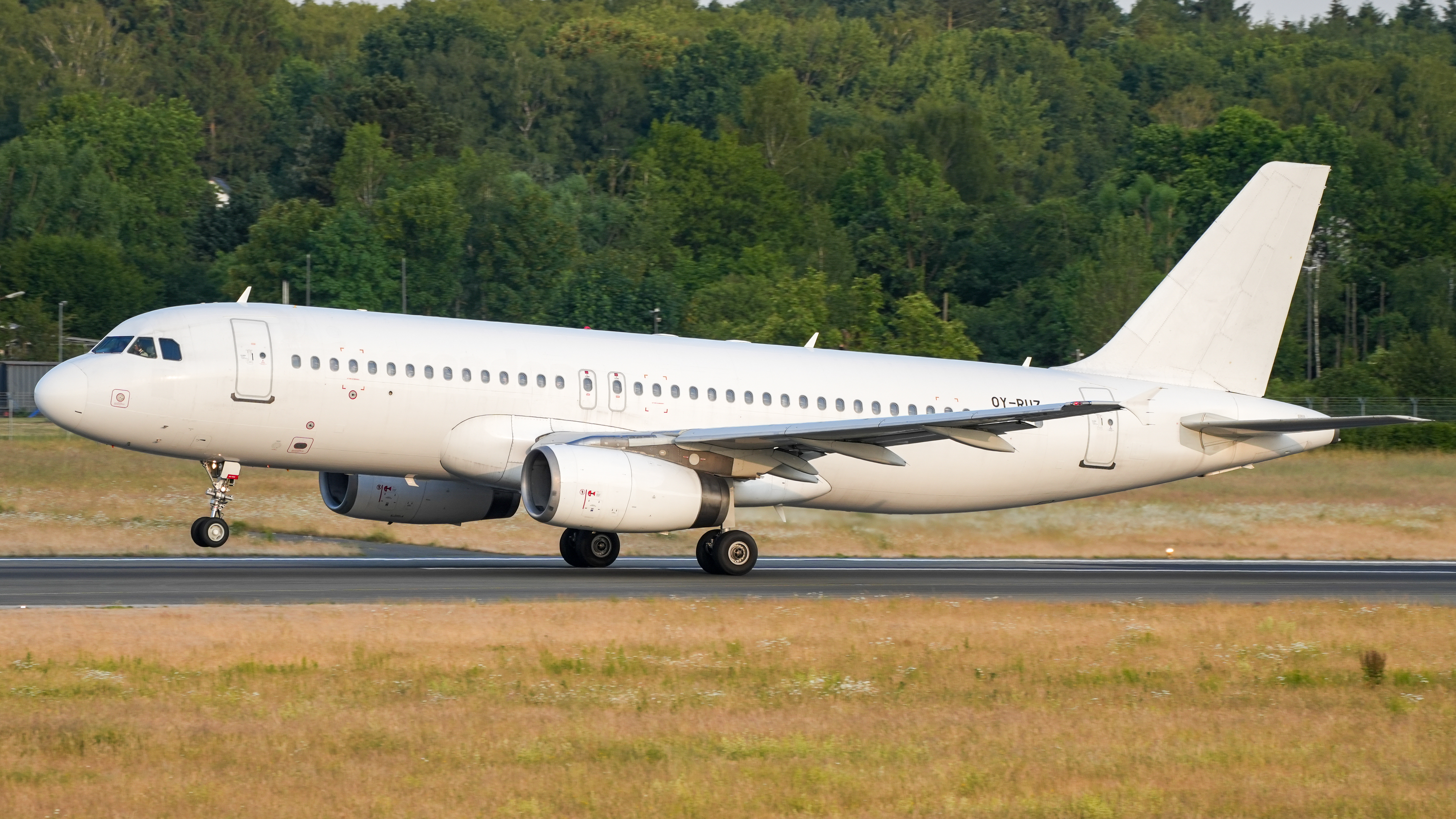
An Airbus A320-232 with V2500 engines

Workshare on the joint venture's first engine, the V2500, was divided between the constituent aero-engine companies. Rolls-Royce based the high pressure compressor on a scale-up of the RC34B eight stage research unit used in the RB401-06 Demonstrator Engine, but with a zero-stage added at the front and a tenth stage added to the rear. Pratt & Whitney developed the combustor and the 2-stage air-cooled high pressure turbine, while the Japanese Aero Engine Corporation provided the low pressure compression system. MTU Aero Engines were responsible for the 5-stage low pressure turbine, while Fiat Avio designed the gearbox. The initial version of this engine, the V2500-A1, first entered service with Slovenian flag carrier Adria Airways.

During July 1986, IAE confirmed to conduct a preliminary design study for a concept examining a high-bypass engine which used the V2500 core components. This engine, commonly referred to as the SuperFan, had a projected maximum thrust of around 28,000–32,000 lbf while having only 80% of the V2500's specific fuel consumption. Prior to that study, the IAE shareholders Rolls-Royce plc, Pratt & Whitney and MTU Aero Engines had examined several configuration for a high-bypass engine, including several design features like a variable fan blade pitch, a geared fan or counterrotating concepts (geared as well as ungeared). Review of these design studies in June indicated the design of such a high-bypass engine as a single-rotation, geared fan configuration with variable blade pitch. The fan diameter was expected to range from 108 to 118 in while having a bypass ratio of 18:1 to 20:1. Availability of the engine was estimated between 1992 and 1994.

In December 1986, the SuperFan was offered to Airbus as a powerplant for the Airbus A340 being developed at that time. In addition to the V2500 core engine, IAE claimed to be able to derive all further components from proven technology. The RB.211-sized fan was to be driven through a Tyne-technology gearbox. This configuration had a 20:1 bypass ratio and was expected to provide a thrust of 30,000 lbf. Due to the application of existing technology, the costs as well as the risks for the SuperFan development program were appraised lower than those of the competing CFM56-5 engine. Due to the lower specific fuel consumption and higher thrust rating, the design of the A340 was modified. Compared to the original design's range of 7,000 nautical miles, the revised version – designated the A340-200 – was projected to have a range up to 8,000 nautical miles with full passenger load. Airbus decided on 26 December 1986 to offer the SuperFan as a primary engine option for the A340. In late January, Boeing announced that it was studying the SuperFan as an option for the 150-seat 7J7 mid-range aircraft, with the SuperFan mounted under the wings instead of the aft fuselage mounting of the 7J7's baseline engine, the General Electric GE36 unducted fan. Airbus was also considering the SuperFan for a 175-seat stretched version of its upcoming Airbus A320 narrowbody aircraft. However, in a board meeting on 7 April 1987, the SuperFan program was officially announced as "indefinitely delayed".

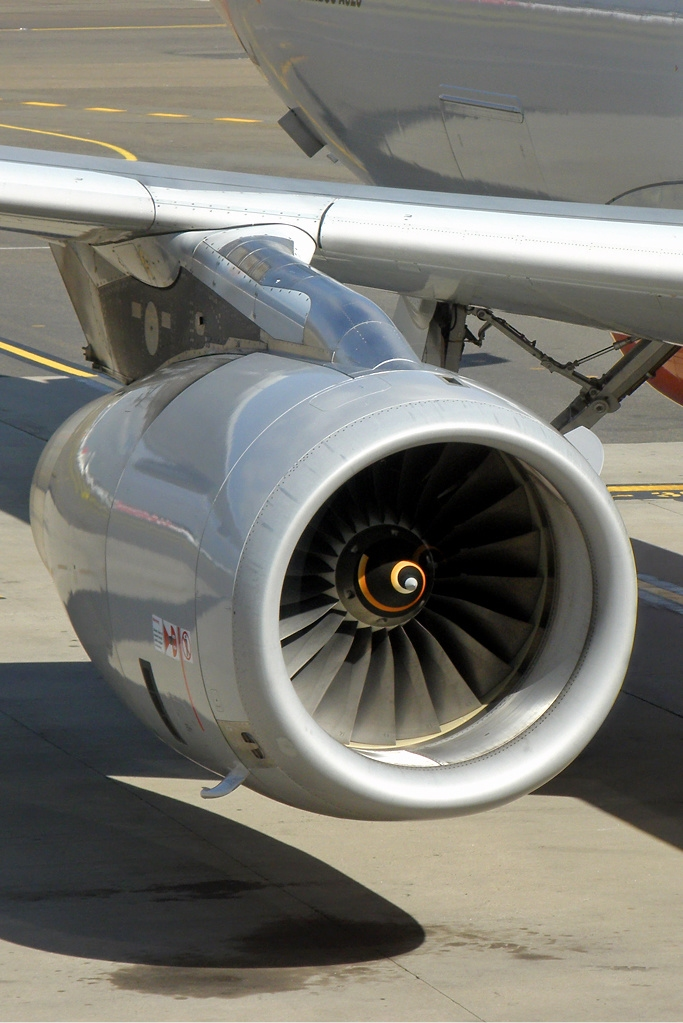
An V2527-A5 engine on an Airbus A320ceo.

By 2003, IAE's 20th year of operation, the consortium's V2500 engine was reportedly in service with in excess of 80 airlines around the world, totalling nearly 900 aircraft; the worldwide fleet had also surpassed 24 million cumulative flying hours. Furthermore, IAE's customers had placed engine orders valued at a combined figure of $25 billion, while the order backlog stood at roughly 2,600 engines. During the following year, the consortium was reportedly seeking to boost the output rate of the V2500 to meet strong demand from the civil sector of the market. During the latter half of the decade, IAE embarked on a sales drive in the growing Chinese market.

During early 2011, IAE announced a commitment to developing a new generation of the V2500 engine, referred to as SelectTwo, along with the provision of substantial support and continued investment in the family. The modifications were described by aerospace periodical Flight International as "unambitious", being mainly restricted to software improvements to the electronic engine control system. Plans for a further upgrade, designated as SelectThree, were also being discussed amongst the consortium's partner companies; an agreement to extend their partnerships through to 2045 has also been finalised that same year. Later that year, IAE clarified a statement from United Technologies that suggested that production of the V2500 engine would end in 2016; instead, IAE intends to continue to manufacture the engine so long as there are orders being placed for it.

During October 2011, it was announced that Rolls-Royce had agreed to sell its 32.5% stake in the joint venture to Pratt & Whitney. Via a separate risk revenue sharing agreement with Pratt & Whitney, MTU Aero Engines increased its program share from 11 to 16 percent. As a result, Pratt & Whitney's total program share in the IAE consortium stands at 61%. The transaction was completed on 29 June 2012. After the transaction, Rolls-Royce continued to make engine parts and assembled 50 percent of the V2500. During 2011, both Rolls-Royce and Pratt & Whitney proposed establishing a new joint venture to develop engines for future generation mid-size aircraft (120-230 passengers); however, during late 2013, it was announced that the two firms had decided to forego such a collaboration in favour of their own independent operations.

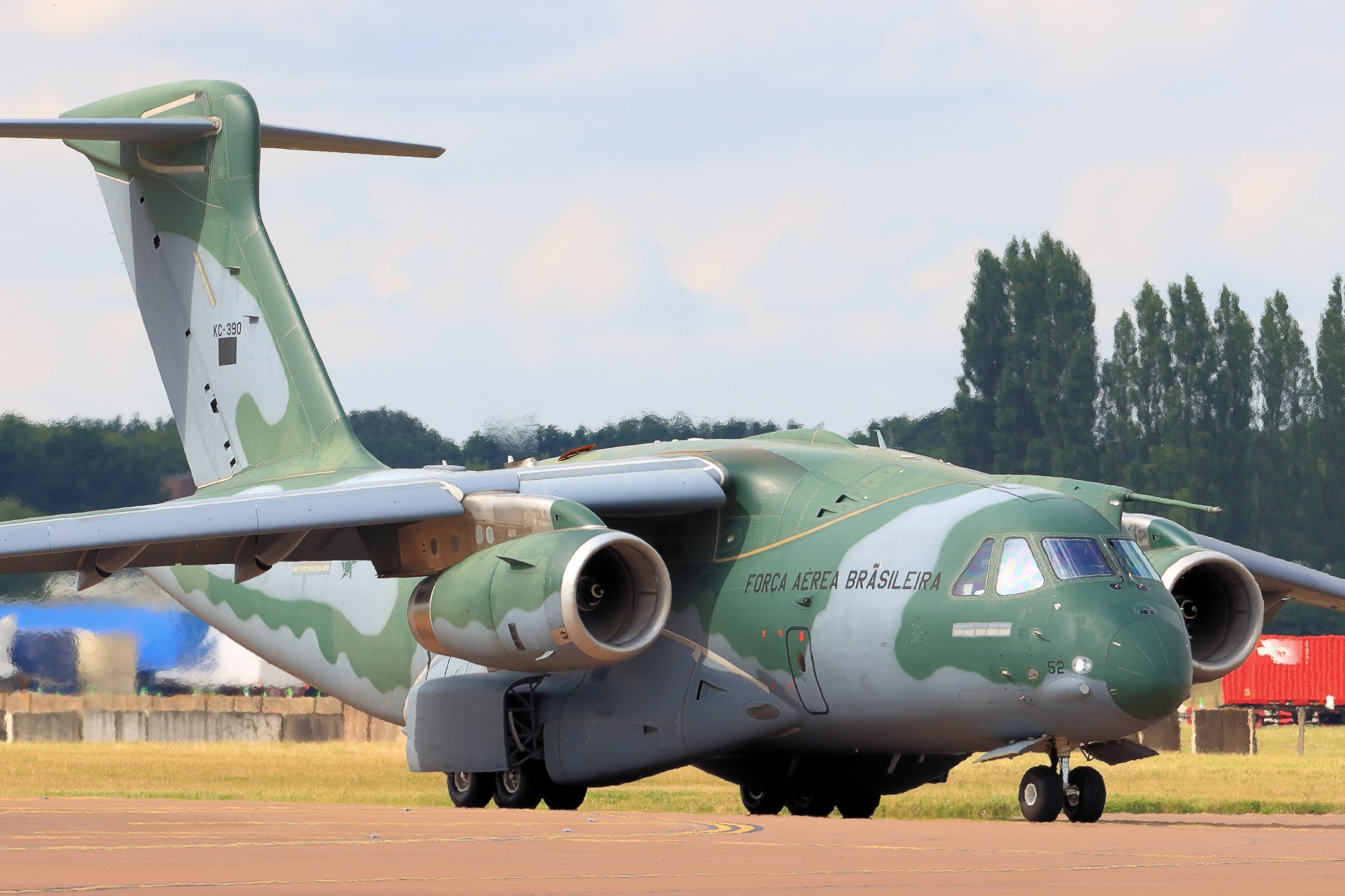
An IAE-powered Embraer C-390 Millennium.

IAE's current purpose is the development, production and aftermarket services of the V2500 aero engine family, which powers the Airbus A320 family and McDonnell Douglas MD-90 aircraft. IAE also supplies the V2500-E5 to power the Embraer KC-390 military transport aircraft; this arrangement is the first military application of the engine. They also hold the type certificate for the Pratt & Whitney PW1100G. The consortium is reportedly open to further military applications for the V2500, in addition to the commercial market. The engine's direct competitor is the CFM International CFM56.

== Shareholders ==
Current shareholders are:

| Company | Country | Interest |
|---|---|---|
| Pratt & Whitney | United States | 32.5% |
| Pratt & Whitney Aero Engines International GmbH | Switzerland | 32.5% |
| MTU Aero Engines | Germany | 12% |
| The Japanese Aero Engine Corporation, consisting of: Kawasaki Heavy Industries; Ishikawajima-Harima Heavy Industries; Mitsubishi Heavy Industries | Japan | 23% |

== Products ==
- IAE V2500
- IAE SuperFan
