= Tolerance coning =

Tolerance coning is the engineering discipline of creating a budget of all tolerances that potentially add/subtract to affect adequacy of a particular parameter. This is particularly critical where stages of design/manufacture precede test/use.

For example, when setting a test limit for a measurement on each manufactured item of some type, to assure that no bad items are shipped, the limit must be tighter than the requirement to allow for the worst case sum of measurement inaccuracies (e.g. equipment, test fixture etc.). The design of the item thus has to take into account not only the product requirement but also the test tolerances. The buildup of this budget is tolerance coning.

Electronics engineers intuitively do tolerance coning and tend to formalise it for critical parameters. However it is also relevant to other engineering disciplines.

== See also ==
- Test method
- Engineering tolerance
- Tolerance stack
