= Tolerance analysis =

Analysis of variation in mechanical parts and assemblies

Tolerance analysis is the general term for activities related to the study of accumulated variation in mechanical parts and assemblies. Its methods may be used on other types of systems subject to accumulated variation, such as mechanical and electrical systems. Engineers analyze tolerances for the purpose of evaluating geometric dimensioning and tolerancing (GD&T). Methods include 2D tolerance stacks, 3D Monte Carlo simulations, and datum conversions.

Tolerance stackups or tolerance stacks are used to describe the problem-solving process in mechanical engineering of calculating the effects of the accumulated variation that is allowed by specified dimensions and tolerances. Typically these dimensions and tolerances are specified on an engineering drawing. Arithmetic tolerance stackups use the worst-case maximum or minimum values of dimensions and tolerances to calculate the maximum and minimum distance (clearance or interference) between two features or parts. Statistical tolerance stackups evaluate the maximum and minimum values based on the absolute arithmetic calculation combined with some method for establishing likelihood of obtaining the maximum and minimum values, such as root sum square (RSS) or Monte-Carlo methods.

== Modeling ==
In performing a tolerance analysis, there are two fundamentally different analysis tools for predicting stackup variation: worst-case analysis and statistical analysis.

=== Worst-case ===
Worst-case tolerance analysis is the traditional type of tolerance stackup calculation. The individual variables are placed at their tolerance limits in order to make the measurement as large or as small as possible. The worst-case model does not consider the distribution of the individual variables, but rather that those variables do not exceed their respective specified limits. This model predicts the maximum expected variation of the measurement. Designing to worst-case tolerance requirements guarantees 100 percent of the parts will assemble and function properly, regardless of the actual component variation. The major drawback is that the worst-case model often requires very tight individual component tolerances. The obvious result is expensive manufacturing and inspection processes and/or high scrap rates. Worst-case tolerancing is often required by the customer for critical mechanical interfaces and spare part replacement interfaces. When worst-case tolerancing is not a contract requirement, properly applied statistical tolerancing can ensure acceptable assembly yields with increased component tolerances and lower fabrication costs.

=== Statistical variation ===
The statistical variation analysis model takes advantage of the principles of statistics to relax the component tolerances without sacrificing quality. Each component's variation is modeled as a statistical distribution and these distributions are summed to predict the distribution of the assembly measurement. Thus, statistical variation analysis predicts a distribution that describes the assembly variation, not the extreme values of that variation. This analysis model provides increased design flexibility by allowing the designer to design to any quality level, not just 100 percent.

There are two chief methods for performing the statistical analysis. In one, the expected distributions are modified in accordance with the relevant geometric multipliers within tolerance limits and then combined using mathematical operations to provide a composite of the distributions. The geometric multipliers are generated by making small deltas to the nominal dimensions. The immediate value to this method is that the output is smooth, but it fails to account for geometric misalignment allowed for by the tolerances; if a size dimension is placed between two parallel surfaces, it is assumed the surfaces will remain parallel, even though the tolerance does not require this. Because the CAD engine performs the variation sensitivity analysis, there is no output available to drive secondary programs such as stress analysis.

In the other, the variations are simulated by allowing random changes to geometry, constrained by expected distributions within allowed tolerances with the resulting parts assembled, and then measurements of critical places are recorded as if in an actual manufacturing environment. The collected data is analyzed to find a fit with a known distribution and mean and standard deviations derived from them. The immediate value to this method is that the output represents what is acceptable, even when that is from imperfect geometry and, because it uses recorded data to perform its analysis, it is possible to include actual factory inspection data into the analysis to see the effect of proposed changes on real data. In addition, because the engine for the analysis is performing the variation internally, not based on CAD regeneration, it is possible to link the variation engine output to another program. For example, a rectangular bar may vary in width and thickness; the variation engine could output those numbers to a stress program which passes back peak stress as a result and the dimensional variation be used to determine likely stress variations. The disadvantage is that each run is unique, so there will be variation from analysis to analysis for the output distribution and mean, just like would come from a factory.

While no official engineering standard covers the process or format of tolerance analysis and stackups, these are essential components of good product design. Tolerance stackups should be used as part of the mechanical design process, both as a predictive and a problem-solving tool. The methods used to conduct a tolerance stackup depend somewhat upon the engineering dimensioning and tolerancing standards that are referenced in the engineering documentation, such as American Society of Mechanical Engineers (ASME) Y14.5, ASME Y14.41, or the relevant ISO dimensioning and tolerancing standards. Understanding the tolerances, concepts and boundaries created by these standards is vital to performing accurate calculations.

Tolerance stackups serve engineers by:

- Helping them study dimensional relationships within an assembly
- Giving designers a means of calculating part tolerances
- Helping engineers compare design proposals
- Helping designers produce complete drawings

== Concept of tolerance vector loop ==
The starting point for the tolerance loop; typically this is one side of an intended gap, after pushing the various parts in the assembly to one side or another of their loose range of motion. Vector loops define the assembly constraints that locate the parts of the assembly relative to each other. The vectors represent the dimensions that contribute to tolerance stackup in the assembly. The vectors are joined tip-to-tail, forming a chain, passing through each part in the assembly in succession. A vector loop must obey certain modeling rules as it passes through a part. It must:

1. Enter through a joint
2. Follow the datum path to the datum reference frame (DRF)
3. Follow a second datum path leading to another joint
4. Exit to the next adjacent part in the assembly

Additional modeling rules for vector loops include:

1. Loops must pass through every part and every joint in the assembly.
2. A single vector loop may not pass through the same part or the same joint twice, but it may start and end in the same part.
3. If a vector loop includes exactly the same dimension twice, in opposite directions, the dimension is redundant and must be omitted.
4. There must be enough loops to solve for all of the kinematic variables (joint degrees of freedom). You will need one loop for each three variables.

The above rules will vary depending on whether 1D, 2D or 3D tolerance stackup method is used.

== Concerns with tolerance stackups ==
A safety factor is often included in designs because of concerns about:

- Operational temperature and pressure of the parts or assembly
- Wear
- Deflection of components after assembly
- The possibility or probability that the parts are slightly out of specification (but passed inspection)
- The sensitivity or importance of the stack (what happens if the design conditions are not met)

== See also ==
- Tolerance coning
