= Rolls-Royce RB401 =

1970s British turbofan aircraft engine

RB.401
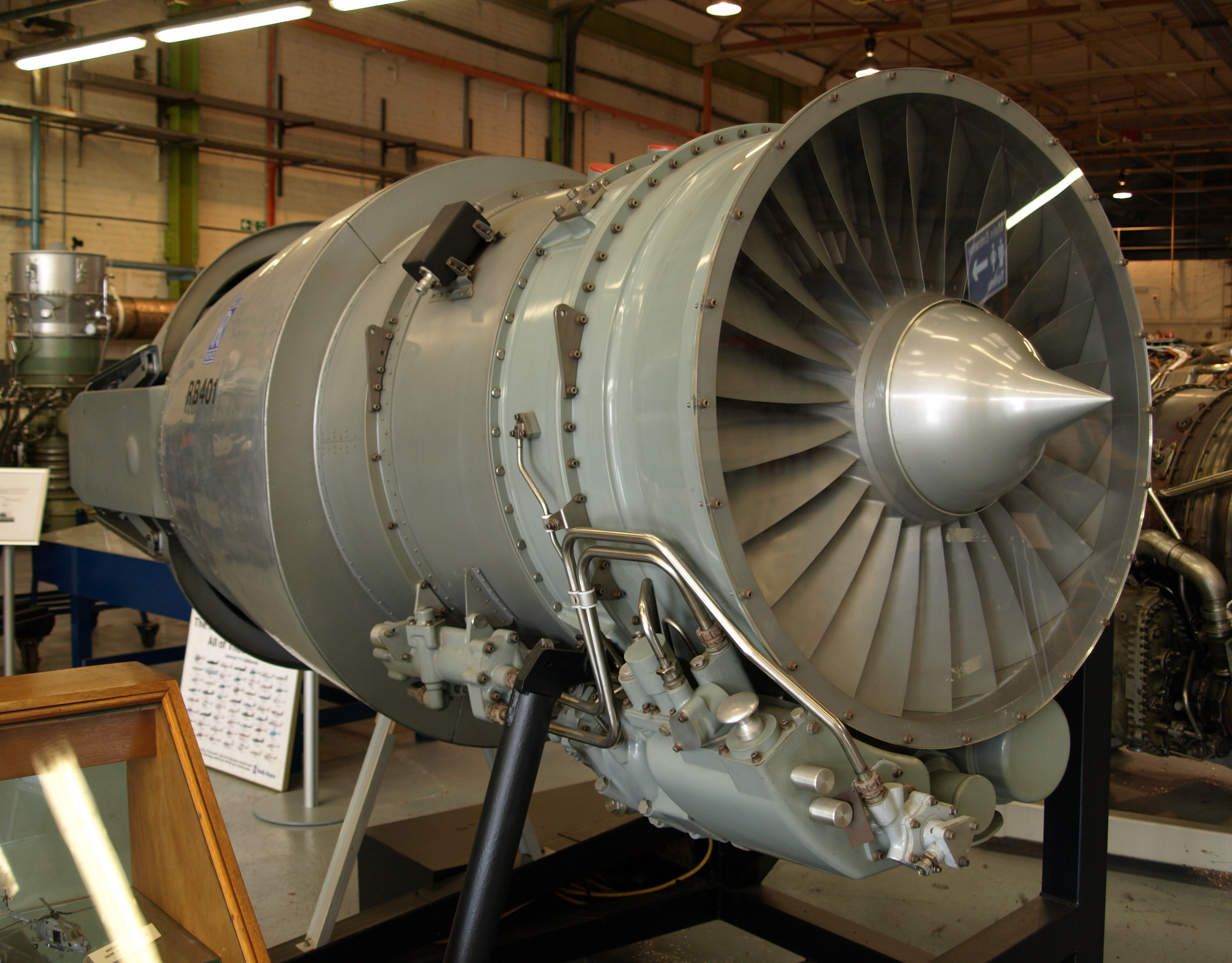
- Rolls-Royce RB.401 turbofan engine at the Rolls-Royce Heritage Trust, Derby
- Type: Turbofan
- Manufacturer: Rolls-Royce
- First run: 21 December 1975

The Rolls-Royce RB.401 was a British two-spool business jet engine which Rolls-Royce started to develop in the mid-1970s as a replacement for the Viper. RB.401-06 prototype engines were already being manufactured when a decision to develop the higher thrust RB.401-07 was taken.

Although ground testing of both the -06 and -07 continued into the early 1980s, a lack of funds caused the project to be cancelled.

== Design and development ==
Although the basic configuration of both engines was almost identical, the -07 variant had a larger fan diameter. The -06 version HP compressor was based on the eight-stage version of the RC34B research compressor, unscaled, whereas the -07 was a scaled-up unit. A single stage fan, driven by a two-stage LP turbine, supercharged the HP compressor which was driven by the single stage transonic HP turbine. The combustor was annular and the co-annular exhaust featured a lightweight target type thrust reverser.

== Specifications (RB.401-07) ==
Data from Jane's.

==== General characteristics ====
- Type: High-bypass two-spool turbofan
- Length: 60.8 in (1,545 mm)
- Diameter: 32.4 in (823 mm) (fan casing)
- Dry weight: 985 lb (447 kg)

==== Components ====
- Compressor: Fan:Single-stage axial, HP:8-stage axial, variable inlet guide vanes
- Combustors: Annular
- Turbine: Two-stage LP, single-stage HP with air-cooled blades
- Fuel type: Hydromechanical with provision for electronic monitoring
- Oil system: Self-contained (tank, pumps, filters and cooler)

==== Performance ====
- Maximum thrust: Take-off thrust: 5,540 lbf (24.7 kN)
- Overall pressure ratio: 11.5:1 (HP compressor)
- Bypass ratio: 4.2:1
- Air mass flow: 182 lb/s (82.5 kg)
- Thrust-to-weight ratio: 5.6:1

== See also ==
Related lists

- List of aircraft engines
