= Engineering tolerance =

Permissible limit or limits of variation

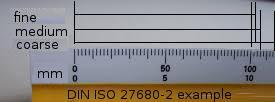
Example for the DIN ISO 2768-2 tolerance table. This is just one example for linear tolerances for a 100 mm value. This is just one of the 8 defined ranges (30–120 mm).

Engineering tolerance is the permissible limit or limits of variation in:

1. a physical dimension;
2. a measured value or physical property of a material, manufactured object, system, or service;
3. other measured values (such as temperature, humidity, etc.);
4. in engineering and safety, a physical distance or space (tolerance), as in a truck (lorry), train or boat under a bridge as well as a train in a tunnel (see structure gauge and loading gauge);
5. in mechanical engineering, the space between a bolt and a nut or a hole, etc.

Dimensions, properties, or conditions may have some variation without significantly affecting functioning of systems, machines, structures, etc. A variation beyond the tolerance (for example, a temperature that is too hot or too cold) is said to be noncompliant, rejected, or exceeding the tolerance.

== Considerations when setting tolerances ==
A primary concern is to determine how wide the tolerances may be without affecting other factors or the outcome of a process. This can be by the use of scientific principles, engineering knowledge, and professional experience. Experimental investigation is very useful to investigate the effects of tolerances: Design of experiments, formal engineering evaluations, etc.

A good set of engineering tolerances in a specification, by itself, does not imply that compliance with those tolerances will be achieved. Actual production of any product (or operation of any system) involves some inherent variation of input and output. Measurement error and statistical uncertainty are also present in all measurements. With a normal distribution, the tails of measured values may extend well beyond plus and minus three standard deviations from the process average. Appreciable portions of one (or both) tails might extend beyond the specified tolerance.

The process capability of systems, materials, and products needs to be compatible with the specified engineering tolerances. Process controls must be in place and an effective quality management system, such as Total Quality Management, needs to keep actual production within the desired tolerances. A process capability index is used to indicate the relationship between tolerances and actual measured production.

The choice of tolerances is also affected by the intended statistical sampling plan and its characteristics such as the Acceptable Quality Level. This relates to the question of whether tolerances must be extremely rigid (high confidence in 100% conformance) or whether some small percentage of being out-of-tolerance may sometimes be acceptable.

== An alternative view of tolerances ==
Genichi Taguchi and others have suggested that traditional two-sided tolerancing is analogous to "goal posts" in a football game: It implies that all data within those tolerances are equally acceptable. The alternative is that the best product has a measurement which is precisely on target. There is an increasing loss which is a function of the deviation or variability from the target value of any design parameter. The greater the deviation from target, the greater is the loss. This is described as the Taguchi loss function or quality loss function, and it is the key principle of an alternative system called inertial tolerancing.

Research and development work conducted by M. Pillet and colleagues at the Savoy University has resulted in industry-specific adoption. Recently the publishing of the French standard NFX 04-008 has allowed further consideration by the manufacturing community.

== Mechanical component tolerance ==
Summary of basic size, fundamental deviation and IT grades compared to minimum and maximum sizes of the shaft and hole

Dimensional tolerance is related to, but different from fit in mechanical engineering, which is a designed-in clearance or interference between two parts. Tolerances are assigned to parts for manufacturing purposes, as boundaries for acceptable build. No machine can hold dimensions precisely to the nominal value, so there must be acceptable degrees of variation. If a part is manufactured, but has dimensions that are out of tolerance, it is not a usable part according to the design intent. Tolerances can be applied to any dimension. The commonly used terms are:

Basic size
The nominal diameter of the shaft (or bolt) and the hole. This is, in general, the same for both components.
Lower deviation
The difference between the minimum possible component size and the basic size.
Upper deviation
The difference between the maximum possible component size and the basic size.
Fundamental deviation
The minimum difference in size between a component and the basic size.

This is identical to the upper deviation for shafts and the lower deviation for holes. If the fundamental deviation is greater than zero, the bolt will always be smaller than the basic size and the hole will always be wider. Fundamental deviation is a form of allowance, rather than tolerance.

International Tolerance grade
This is a standardised measure of the maximum difference in size between the component and the basic size (see below).

For example, if a shaft with a nominal diameter of 10 mm is to have a sliding fit within a hole, the shaft might be specified with a tolerance range from 9.964 to 10 mm (i.e., a zero fundamental deviation, but a lower deviation of 0.036 mm) and the hole might be specified with a tolerance range from 10.04 mm to 10.076 mm (0.04 mm fundamental deviation and 0.076 mm upper deviation). This would provide a clearance fit of somewhere between 0.04 mm (largest shaft paired with the smallest hole, called the Maximum Material Condition - MMC) and 0.112 mm (smallest shaft paired with the largest hole, Least Material Condition - LMC). In this case the size of the tolerance range for both the shaft and hole is chosen to be the same (0.036 mm), meaning that both components have the same International Tolerance grade but this need not be the case in general.

When no other tolerances are provided, the machining industry uses the following standard tolerances:

1 decimal place	(.x):	±0.2"
2 decimal places	(.0x):	±0.01"
3 decimal places	(.00x):	±0.005"
4 decimal places	(.000x):	±0.0005"

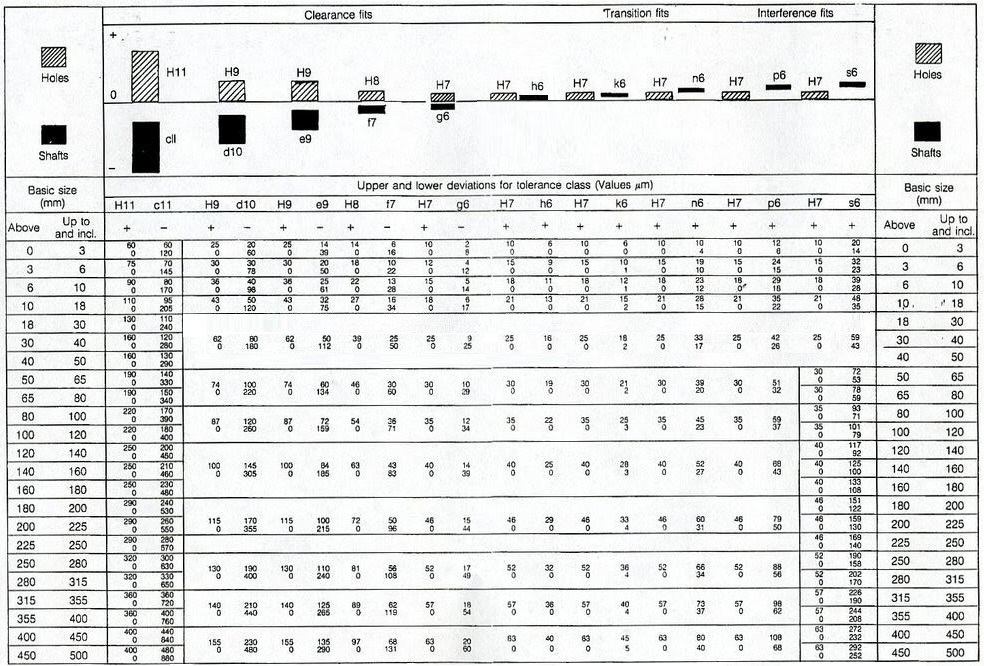
Limits and fits establish in 1980, not corresponding to the current ISO tolerances

=== International Tolerance grades ===
When designing mechanical components, a system of standardized tolerances called International Tolerance grades are often used. The standard (size) tolerances are divided into two categories: hole and shaft. They are labelled with a letter (capitals for holes and lowercase for shafts) and a number. For example: H7 (hole, tapped hole, or nut) and h7 (shaft or bolt). H7/h6 is a very common standard tolerance which gives a tight fit. The tolerances work in such a way that for a hole H7 means that the hole should be made slightly larger than the base dimension (in this case for an ISO fit 10+0.015−0, meaning that it may be up to 0.015 mm larger than the base dimension, and 0 mm smaller). The actual amount bigger/smaller depends on the base dimension. For a shaft of the same size, h6 would mean 10+0−0.009, which means the shaft may be as small as 0.009 mm smaller than the base dimension and 0 mm larger. This method of standard tolerances is also known as Limits and Fits and can be found in ISO 286-1:2010 (Link to ISO catalog).

The table below summarises the International Tolerance (IT) grades and the general applications of these grades:

	Measuring Tools									Material								
IT Grade	01	0	1	2	3	4	5	6	7	8	9	10	11	12	13	14	15	16
							Fits							Large Manufacturing Tolerances				

An analysis of fit by statistical interference is also extremely useful: It indicates the frequency (or probability) of parts properly fitting together.

== Electrical component tolerance ==
An electrical specification might call for a resistor with a nominal value of 100 Ω (ohms), but will also state a tolerance such as "±1%". This means that any resistor with a value in the range 99–101 Ω is acceptable. For critical components, one might specify that the actual resistance must remain within tolerance within a specified temperature range, over a specified lifetime, and so on.

Many commercially available resistors and capacitors of standard types, and some small inductors, are often marked with coloured bands to indicate their value and the tolerance. High-precision components of non-standard values may have numerical information printed on them.

Low tolerance means only a small deviation from the components given value, when new, under normal operating conditions and at room temperature. Higher tolerance means the component will have a wider range of possible values.

== Difference between allowance and tolerance ==
The terms are often confused but sometimes a difference is maintained. See Allowance (engineering) § Confounding of the engineering concepts of allowance and tolerance.

== Clearance (civil engineering) ==
In civil engineering, clearance refers to the difference between the loading gauge and the structure gauge in the case of railroad cars or trams, or the difference between the size of any vehicle and the width/height of doors, the width/height of an overpass or the diameter of a tunnel as well as the air draft under a bridge, the width of a lock or diameter of a tunnel in the case of watercraft. In addition there is the difference between the deep draft and the stream bed or sea bed of a waterway.

== See also ==
- Backlash (engineering)
- Geometric dimensioning and tolerancing
- Engineering fit
- Key relevance
- Loading gauge
- Margin of error
- Precision engineering
- Probabilistic design
- Process capability
- Slack action
- Specification (technical standard)
- Statistical process control
- Statistical tolerance
- Structure gauge
- Taguchi methods
- Tolerance coning
- Tolerance interval
- Tolerance stacks
- Verification and validation
