= Airbus A320 family =

Single-aisle airliner family

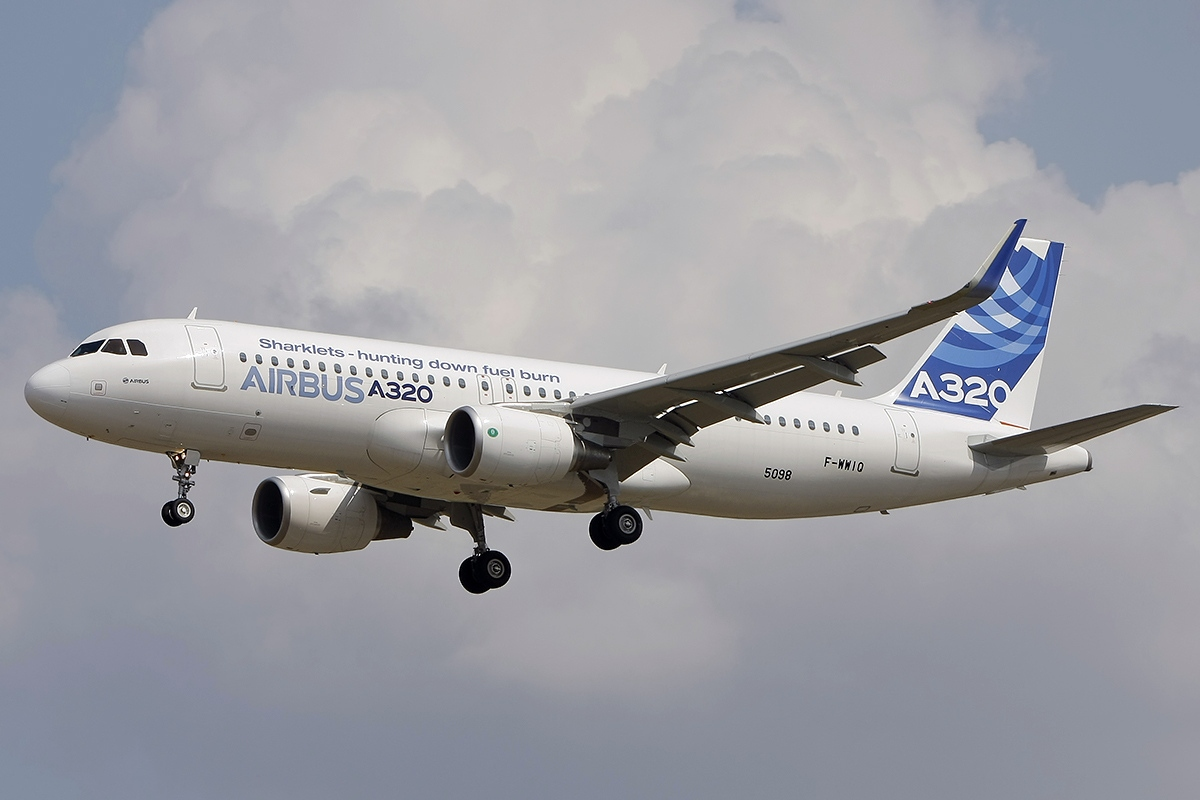
- An A320 in the Airbus corporate livery in 2012

General information
- Role: Narrow-body jet airliner
- National origin: Multi-national (Note: Final assembly in China, France, Germany or the United States.)
- Manufacturer: Airbus
- Status: In service
- Primary users: American Airlines: IndiGo; China Eastern Airlines; EasyJet
- Number built: 12,955 as of October 2026

History
- Manufactured: ceo: 1986–2021 neo: 2016–present
- Introduction date: 18 April 1988 with Air France
- First flight: 22 February 1987; 39 years ago
- Variants: Airbus A318; Airbus A319; Airbus A321
- Developed into: Airbus A320neo family

The Airbus A320 family is a series of narrow-body airliners developed and produced by Airbus, and is the best-selling airliner ever built. The A320 aircraft programme was launched in March 1984, first flew on 22 February 1987, and was introduced in April 1988 by Air France. The first member of the family was followed by the stretched A321 (first delivered in January 1994), the shorter A319 (April 1996), and the shortest variant, the A318 (July 2003). Final assembly takes place in Toulouse in France; Hamburg in Germany; Tianjin in China since 2009; and Mobile, Alabama, in the United States since April 2016.

The twinjet has a six-abreast economy cross-section and came with either CFM56-5A or -5B, or IAE V2500 turbofan engines, except the A318. The A318 has either two CFM56-5B engines or a pair of PW6000 engines in place of the IAE V2500. The family pioneered the use of digital fly-by-wire and side-stick flight controls in airliners. Variants offer maximum take-off weights from 68 to 93.5 tonnes (150,000 to 206,000 lb), with a range of 5,740–6,940 kilometres (3,570–4,320 mi; 3,100–3,750 nmi). The 31.4 m (103 ft) long A318 typically accommodates 107 to 132 passengers. The 124-156 seat A319 is 33.8 m (111 ft) long. The A320 is 37.6 m (123 ft) long and can accommodate 150 to 186 passengers. The 44.5 m (146 ft) A321 offers 185 to 230 seats. The Airbus Corporate Jets are modified business jet versions of the standard commercial variants.

In December 2010, Airbus announced the re-engined A320neo (new engine option), which entered service with Lufthansa in January 2016. With more efficient turbofans and improvements including "sharklet" winglets, it offers up to 15% better fuel economy. The previous A320 generation was renamed A320ceo (current engine option).

American Airlines is the largest A320 family operator with 498 aircraft in its fleet, while IndiGo is the largest customer with 930 aircraft on order as of October 2026. A total of 20,598 A320 family aircraft have been ordered of which 12,955 units have been delivered and 11,422 units are in service with more than 375 operators. It overtook the Boeing 737 family in terms of total fleet size in 2017, in terms of total orders in October 2019 and in terms of total deliveries in September 2025. The global A320 fleet had completed more than 176 million flights over 328 million block hours since its entry into service. The A320ceo initially competed with the 737 Classic and the MD-80, then their successors, the 737 Next Generation (737NG) and the MD-90 respectively, while the 737 MAX is Boeing's response to the A320neo.

== Development ==
=== Origins ===
The Joint European Transport JET2-100 concept

When Airbus designed the A300 during the late 1960s and early 1970s, it envisaged a broad family of airliners with which to compete against Boeing and McDonnell Douglas, two established US aerospace manufacturers. From the moment of formation, Airbus had begun studies into derivatives of the Airbus A300B in support of this long-term goal. Prior to the service introduction of the first Airbus airliners, engineers within Airbus had identified nine possible variations of the A300 known as A300B1 to B9. A 10th variation, conceived in 1973, later the first to be constructed, was designated the A300B10. It was a smaller aircraft which would be developed into the long-range Airbus A310. Airbus then focused its efforts on the single-aisle market, which was dominated by the 737 and McDonnell Douglas DC-9.

Plans from a number of European aircraft manufacturers called for a successor to the relatively successful BAC One-Eleven, and to replace the 737-200 and DC-9. Germany's MBB (Messerschmitt-Bölkow-Blohm), British Aircraft Corporation, Sweden's Saab and Spain's CASA worked on the EUROPLANE, a 180- to 200-seat aircraft. It was abandoned after intruding on A310 specifications. VFW-Fokker, Dornier and Hawker Siddeley worked on a number of 150-seat designs.

The design within the JET study that was carried forward was the JET2 (163 passengers), which then became the Airbus S.A1/2/3 series (Single Aisle), before settling on the A320 name for its launch in 1984. Previously, Hawker Siddeley had produced a design called the HS.134 "Airbus" in 1965, an evolution of the HS.121 (formerly DH.121) Trident, which shared much of the general arrangement of the later JET3 study design. The name "Airbus" at the time referred to a BEA requirement, rather than to the later international programme.

=== Design effort ===
In June 1977 a new Joint European Transport (JET) programme was set up, established by British Aerospace (BAe), Aerospatiale, Dornier and Fokker. It was based at the then-BAe (formerly Vickers) site in Weybridge, Surrey, UK. Although the members were all Airbus' partners, they regarded the project as a separate collaboration from Airbus. This project was considered the forerunner of Airbus A320, encompassing the 130- to 188-seat market, powered by two CFM56s. It would have a cruise speed of Mach 0.84 (faster than the Boeing 737). The programme was later transferred to Airbus, leading up to the creation of the Single-Aisle (SA) studies in 1980, led by former leader of the JET programme, Derek Brown. The group looked at three different variants, covering the 125- to 180-seat market, called SA1, SA2 and SA3. Although unaware at the time, the consortium was producing the blueprints for the A319, A320 and A321, respectively. The single-aisle programme created divisions within Airbus about whether to design a shorter-range twinjet rather than a longer-range quadjet wanted by the West Germans, particularly Lufthansa. However, works proceeded, and the German carrier would eventually order the twinjet.

In February 1981 the project was re-designated A320, with efforts focused on the blueprint formerly designated SA2. During the year, Airbus worked with Delta Air Lines on a 150-seat aircraft envisioned and required by the airline. The A320 would carry 150 passengers 5,280–3,440 km (3,280–2,140 mi; 2,850–1,860 nmi) using fuel from wing fuel tanks only. The −200 had the centre tank activated, increasing fuel capacity from 15,590 to 23,430 L; 4,118 to 6,190 US gal (3,429 to 5,154 imp gal). They would measure 36.04 and 39.24 m (118 ft 3 in and 128 ft 9 in) respectively. Airbus considered a fuselage diameter of "the Boeing 707 and 727, or do something better" and settled on a wider cross-section with a 3.7 m (12 ft 2 in) internal width, compared to Boeing's 3.45 m (11 ft 4 in). Although heavier, this allowed the A320 to compete more effectively with the 737. The A320 wing went through several design stages, eventually measuring 33.91 m (111 ft 3 in).

=== National shares ===
The UK, France and West Germany wanted responsibility over final assembly and its associated work, known as "work-share arguments". The Germans requested an increased work-share of 40%, while the British wanted the major responsibilities to be swapped around to give partners production and research and development experience. In the end, British work-share was increased from that of the two previous Airbuses.

France was willing to commit to launch aid, or subsidies, while the Germans were more cautious. The UK government was unwilling to provide funding for the tooling, requested by BAe and estimated at £250 million; it was postponed for three years. On 1 March 1984, the British government and BAe agreed that £50 million would be paid, whether the A320 flew or not, while the rest would be paid as a levy on each aircraft sold. In 1984, the program cost was then estimated at £2 billion ($2.8 billion) by Flight International, equivalent to £7 billion today.

=== Launch ===
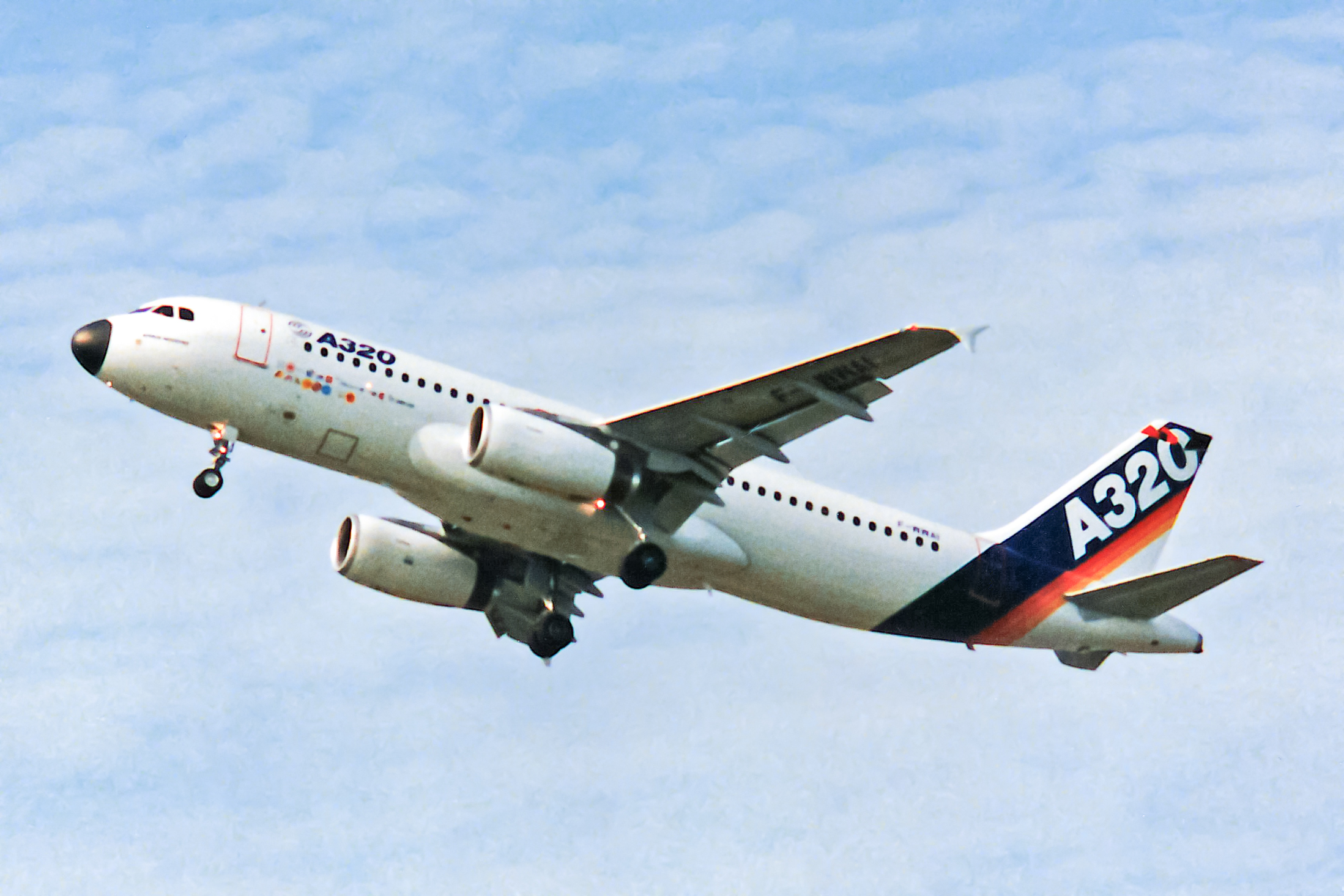
The A320 first prototype (retrofitted with IAE V2500-A1 engines) at the 1988 Farnborough Airshow

The programme was launched on 2 March 1984. At the time, Airbus had 96 orders. Air France was its first customer to sign a "letter of intent" for 25 A320s and options for 25 more at the 1981 Paris Air Show. In October 1983, British Caledonian placed seven firm orders, bringing total orders to more than 80. Cyprus Airways became the first customer to place an order for V2500-powered A320s in November 1984, followed by Pan Am with 16 firm orders and 34 options in January 1985, and then Inex Adria. One of the most significant orders occurred when Northwest Airlines placed an order for 100 A320s in October 1986, powered by CFM56 engines, later confirmed at the 1990 Farnborough Airshow.

During A320 development, Airbus considered propfan technology, which was backed by Lufthansa. At the time unproven, the technology essentially consisted of a fan placed outside the engine nacelle, offering turbofan speeds and turboprop economics; ultimately, Airbus stuck with turbofans.

Power on the A320 was to be supplied by two CFM56-5-A1s rated at 111 kN (25,000 pounds-force). It was the only engine available until the arrival of the IAE V2500, offered by International Aero Engines, a group composed of Rolls-Royce plc, Pratt & Whitney, Japanese Aero Engine Corporation, Fiat and MTU. The first V2500 variant, the V2500-A1, has a thrust output of 110 kN (25,000 pounds-force), hence the name. It is 4% more efficient than the CFM56, with cruise thrust-specific fuel consumption for the -A5 at 16.3 and 16.9 g/kN/s (0.58 and 0.60 lb/lbf/h) for the CFM56-5A1.

=== Entry into service ===
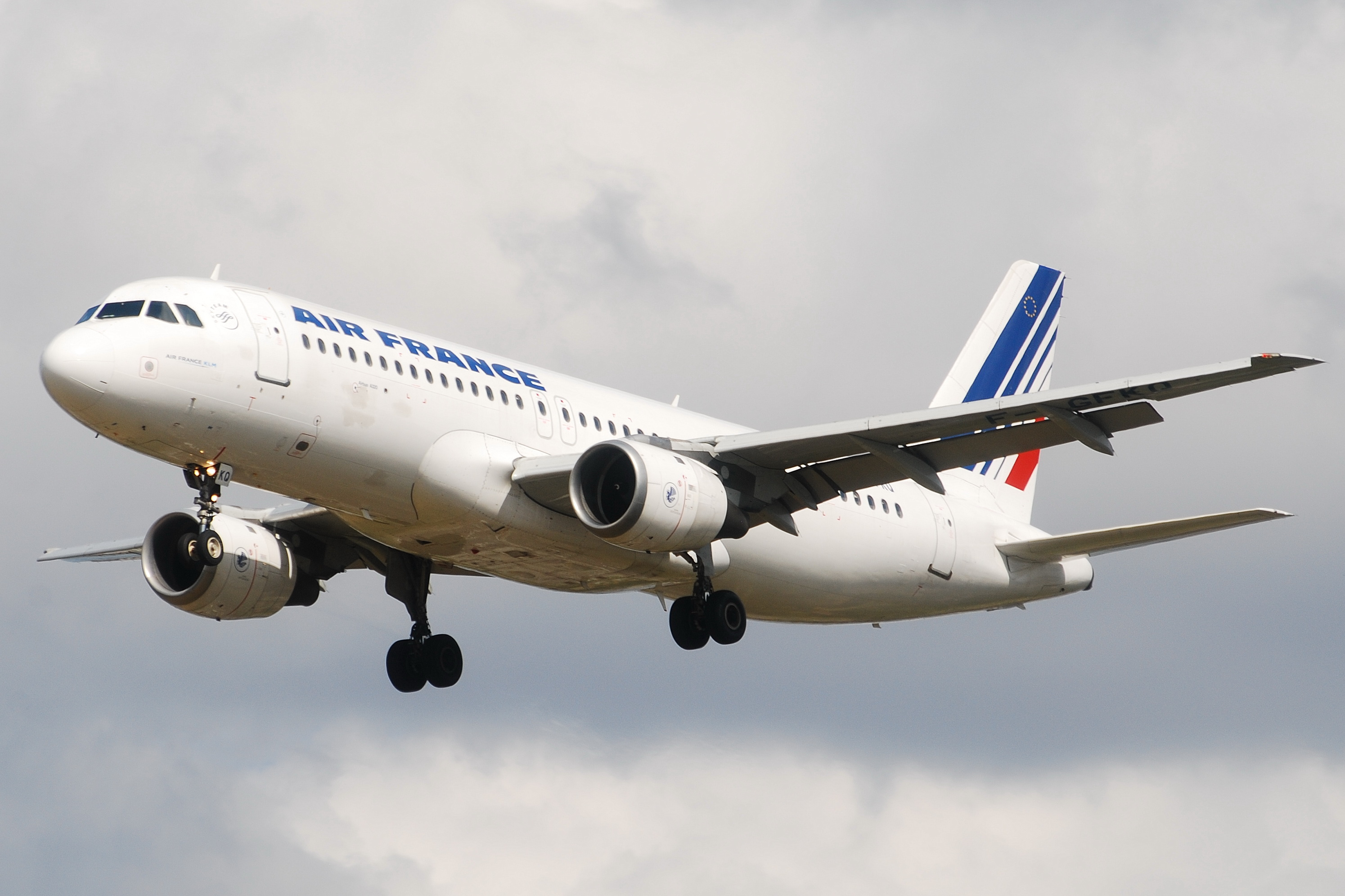
The first A320 was delivered to Air France on 28 March 1988; the early A320-100s had no wingtip fences.

In the presence of then-French Prime Minister Jacques Chirac and the Prince and Princess of Wales, the first A320 was rolled out of final assembly line at Toulouse on 14 February 1987 and made its maiden flight on 22 February in 3 hours and 23 minutes. The flight test programme took 1,200 hours over 530 flights. European Joint Aviation Authorities (JAA) certification was awarded on 26 February 1988. The first A320 was delivered to Air France on 28 March, and began commercial service on 8 April with a flight between Paris and Berlin via Düsseldorf. In 1988, the clean-sheet aircraft program cost was 5.486 billion French francs.

=== Stretching the A320: A321 ===
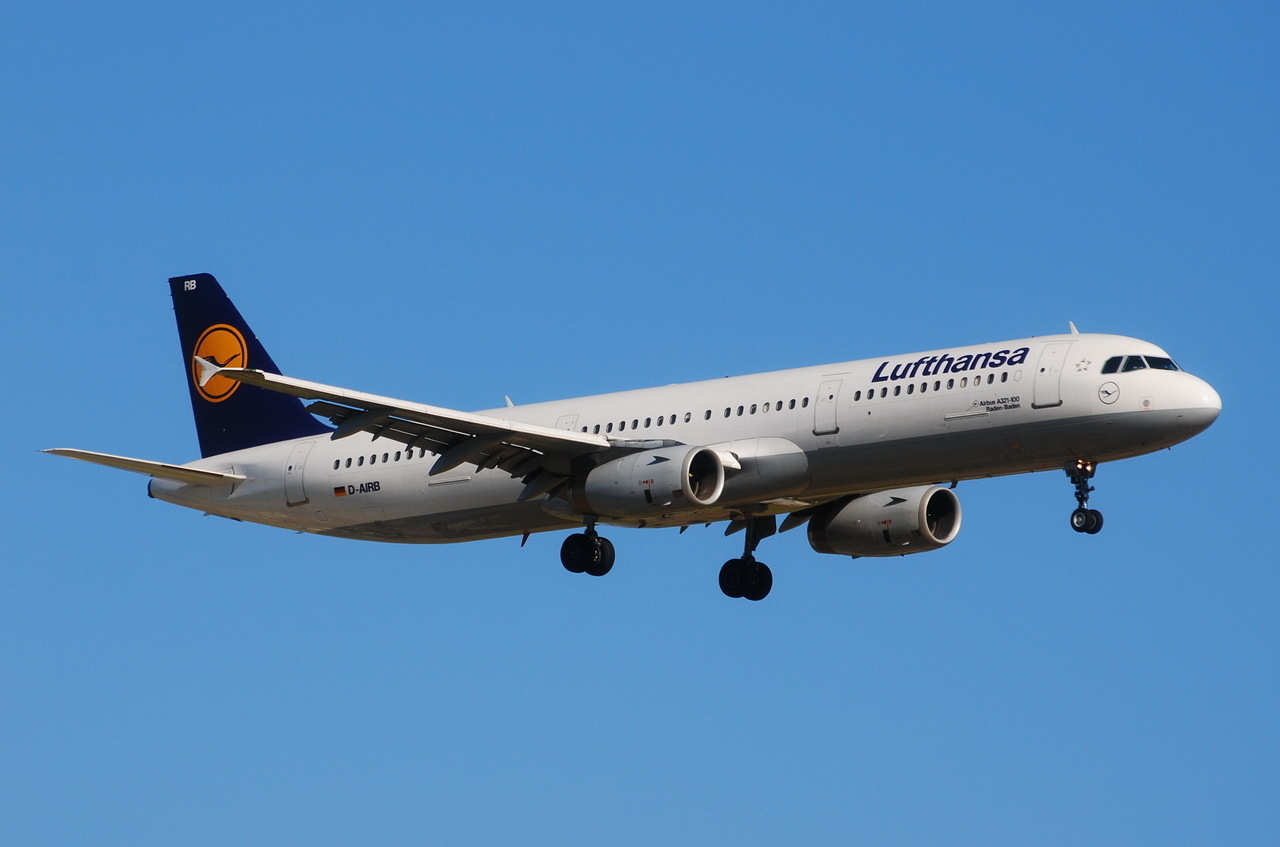
Lufthansa was the first to receive the stretched A321 on 27 January 1994.

The first variation of the baseline A320 was the Airbus A321, also known as the Stretched A320, A320-500 and A325. Launched on 24 November 1988 after commitments for 183 aircraft from 10 customers were secured. The aircraft was to be a minimally changed derivative, apart from minor wing modifications and a fuselage stretch. The wing would incorporate double-slotted flaps and minor trailing edge modifications, increasing wing area from 124 m^{2} (1,330 sq ft) to 128 m^{2} (1,380 sq ft). The fuselage was lengthened by four plugs (two ahead and two behind the wings), making the A321 6.94 metres (22 ft 9 in) longer than the A320 overall. The length increase required enlarged overwing exits, which were repositioned in front of and behind the wings. The centre fuselage and undercarriage were reinforced to accommodate an increase in maximum takeoff weight of 9,600 kg (21,200 lb), for a total of 83,000 kg (183,000 lb).

Final assembly for the A321 would be carried out in Germany (then West Germany), a first for any Airbus. This came after a dispute between the French, who claimed the move would incur $150 million (€135 million) in unnecessary expenditures associated with the new plant, and the Germans, who argued that it would be more productive for Airbus in the long run. The second production line was located at Hamburg, which would also subsequently produce the smaller Airbus A319 and A318. For the first time, Airbus entered the bond market, through which it raised $480 million (€475 million) to finance development costs. An additional $180 million (€175 million) was borrowed from the European Investment Bank and private investors.

The maiden flight of the Airbus A321 came on 11 March 1993, when the prototype, registration F-WWIA, flew with IAE V2500 engines; the second prototype, equipped with CFM56-5B turbofans, flew in May. Lufthansa and Alitalia were the first to order the stretched Airbuses, with 20 and 40 aircraft, respectively. The first of Lufthansa's V2500-A5-powered A321s arrived on 27 January 1994, while Alitalia received its first CFM56-5B-powered aircraft on 22 March.

=== Shrinking the A320: A319 ===
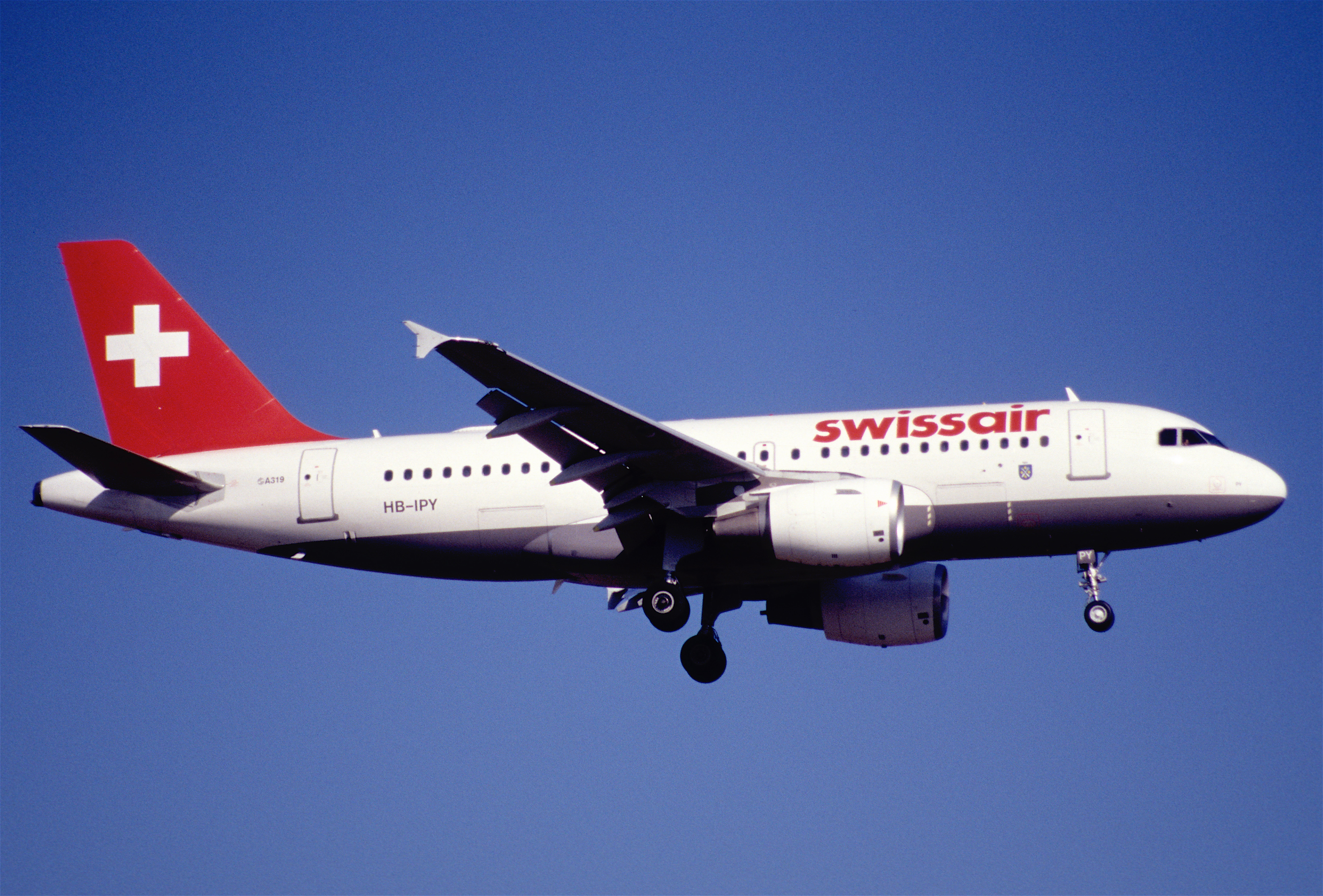
The first A319 was delivered to Swissair on 25 April 1996.

The A319 was the second variation of the baseline A320. The design was a "shrink", with origins in the 130- to 140-seat SA1, part of the Single-Aisle studies, which had been shelved as the consortium focused on its bigger siblings. After healthy sales of the A320/A321, Airbus focused once more on what was then known as the A320M-7, meaning A320 minus seven fuselage frames. It would provide direct competition for the 737-300/-700. The shrink was achieved through the removal of four fuselage frames fore and three aft of the wing, cutting the overall length by 3.73 metres (12 ft 3 in). Consequently, the number of overwing exits was reduced from four to two. The bulk-cargo door was replaced by an aft container door, which can take in reduced height LD3-45 containers. Minor software changes were made to accommodate the different handling characteristics; otherwise the aircraft was largely unchanged. Power is provided by the CFM56-5A, CFM56-5B, or V2500-A5, derated to 98 kN (22,000 lbf), with a 105 kN (24,000 lbf) thrust option.

Airbus began offering the new model from 22 May 1992, with the actual launch of the $275 million (€250 million) programme occurring on 10 June 1993; the A319's first customer was ILFC, which signed for six aircraft. On 23 March 1995, the first A319 underwent final assembly at Airbus' German plant in Hamburg, where A321s were also assembled. It was rolled out on 24 August 1995, with the maiden flight taking place the following day. The certification programme took 350 airborne hours involving two aircraft. Certification for the CFM56-5B6/2-equipped variant was granted in April 1996, and qualification for the V2524-A5 started the following month.

Delivery of the first A319, to Swissair, occurred on 25 April 1996; it entered service by month's end. In January 1997, an A319 broke a record during a delivery flight by flying the 6,645-kilometre (4,129 mi; 3,588 nmi) great circle route to Winnipeg, Manitoba from Hamburg in 9 hours and 5 minutes. The A319 has proven popular with low-cost airlines such as EasyJet, which purchased 172 of them.

=== Second shrink: A318 ===
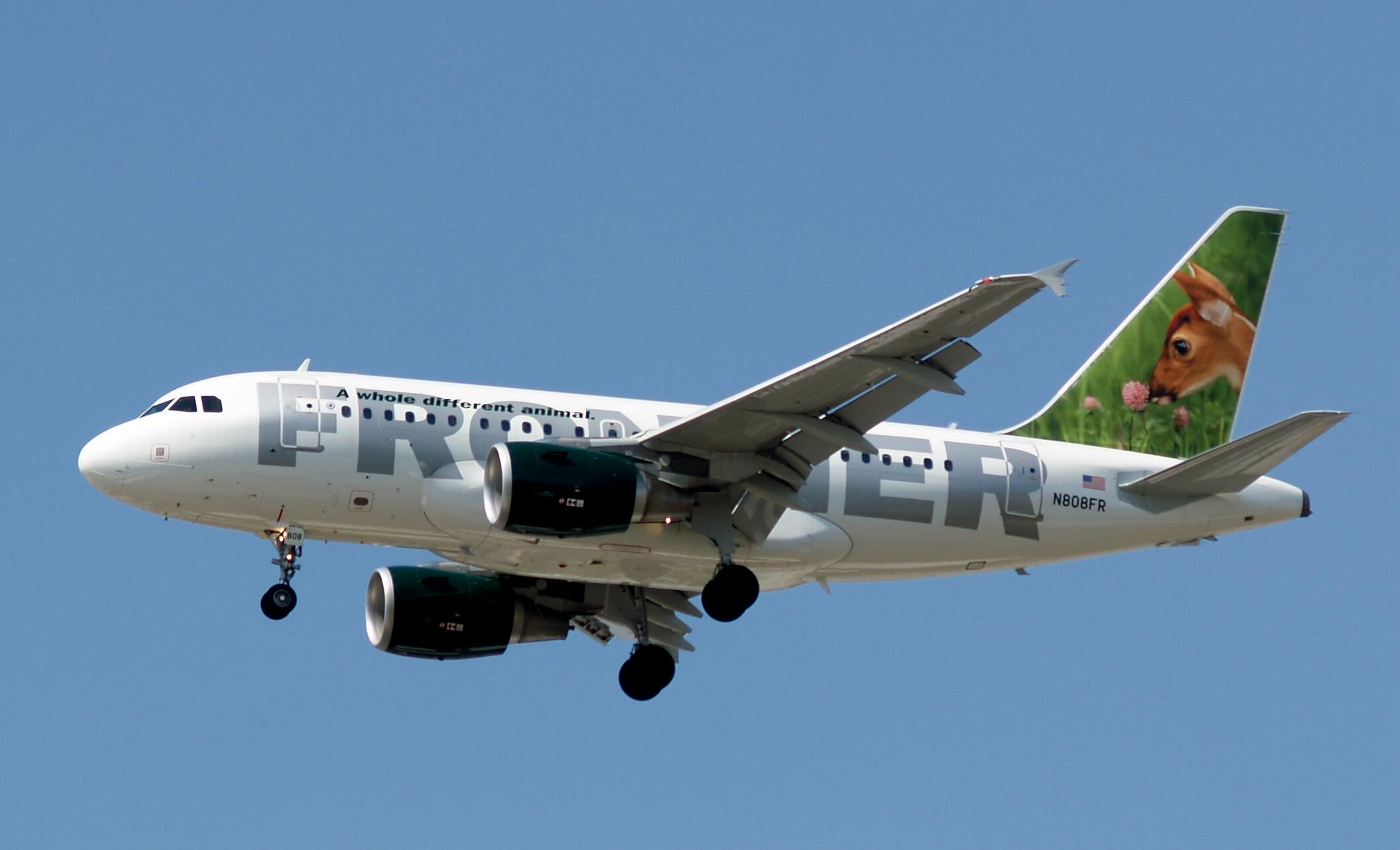
Frontier Airlines received the first A318 on 22 July 2003.

The A318, the fourth variant, was born out of mid-1990 studies between Aviation Industry Corporation of China (AVIC), Singapore Technologies Aerospace, Alenia and Airbus on a 95- to 125-seat aircraft project. The programme was called the AE31X, and covered the 95-seat AE316 and 115- to 125-seat AE317. The former would have had an overall length of 31.3 m (102 ft 8 in), while the AE317 was longer by 3.2 m (10 ft 6 in), at 34.5 m (113 ft 2 in). The engines were to be two Rolls-Royce BR715s, CFM56-9s, or the Pratt & Whitney PW6000; with the MTOW of 53.3 t (118,000 lb) for the smaller version and 58 t (128,000 lb) for the AE317, the thrust requirement were 77.9–84.6 kN (17,500–19,000 lbf) and 84.6–91.2 kN (19,000–20,500 lbf), respectively. Range was settled at 5,200 km (2,800 nmi; 3,200 mi) and 5,800 km (3,100 nmi; 3,600 mi) for the high gross weights of both variants. Both share a wingspan of 31.0 m (101 ft 8 in) and a flight deck similar to that of the A320 family. Costing $2 billion (€1.85 billion) to develop, aircraft production was to take place in China.

Simultaneously, Airbus was developing the Airbus A318. In early 1998, Airbus revealed that it was designing a 100-seat aircraft based on the A320. The AE31X project was terminated by September 1998, and Airbus officially announced the A318 at that year's Farnborough Airshow. The aircraft was the smallest in Airbus's product range, coincidentally developed at the same time as the largest commercial aircraft in history, the Airbus A380. First called A319M5 as early as March 1995, it was shorter by 0.79 metres (2 ft 7 in) ahead of the wing and 1.6 metres (5 ft 3 in) behind. These cuts reduced passenger capacity from 124 on the A319 to 107 in a two-class layout. Range was 5,700 kilometres (3,100 nmi; 3,500 mi), or 5,950 kilometres (3,210 nmi; 3,700 mi) with sharklets.

The 107-seater was launched on 26 April 1999 with the options and orders count at 109 aircraft. After three years of design, the maiden flight took place at Hamburg on 15 January 2002. Tests on the lead engine, the PW6000, revealed worse-than-expected fuel consumption. Consequently, Pratt & Whitney abandoned the five-stage high-pressure compressor (HPC) for the MTU-designed six-stage HPC. The 129 order book for the A318 shrank to 80, largely because of switches to other A320 family members. After 17 months of flight certification, during which 850 hours and 350 flights were accumulated, JAA certification was obtained for the CFM56-powered variant on 23 May 2003. On 22 July 2003, first delivery for launch customer Frontier Airlines occurred, entering service before the end of the month.

=== Production ===
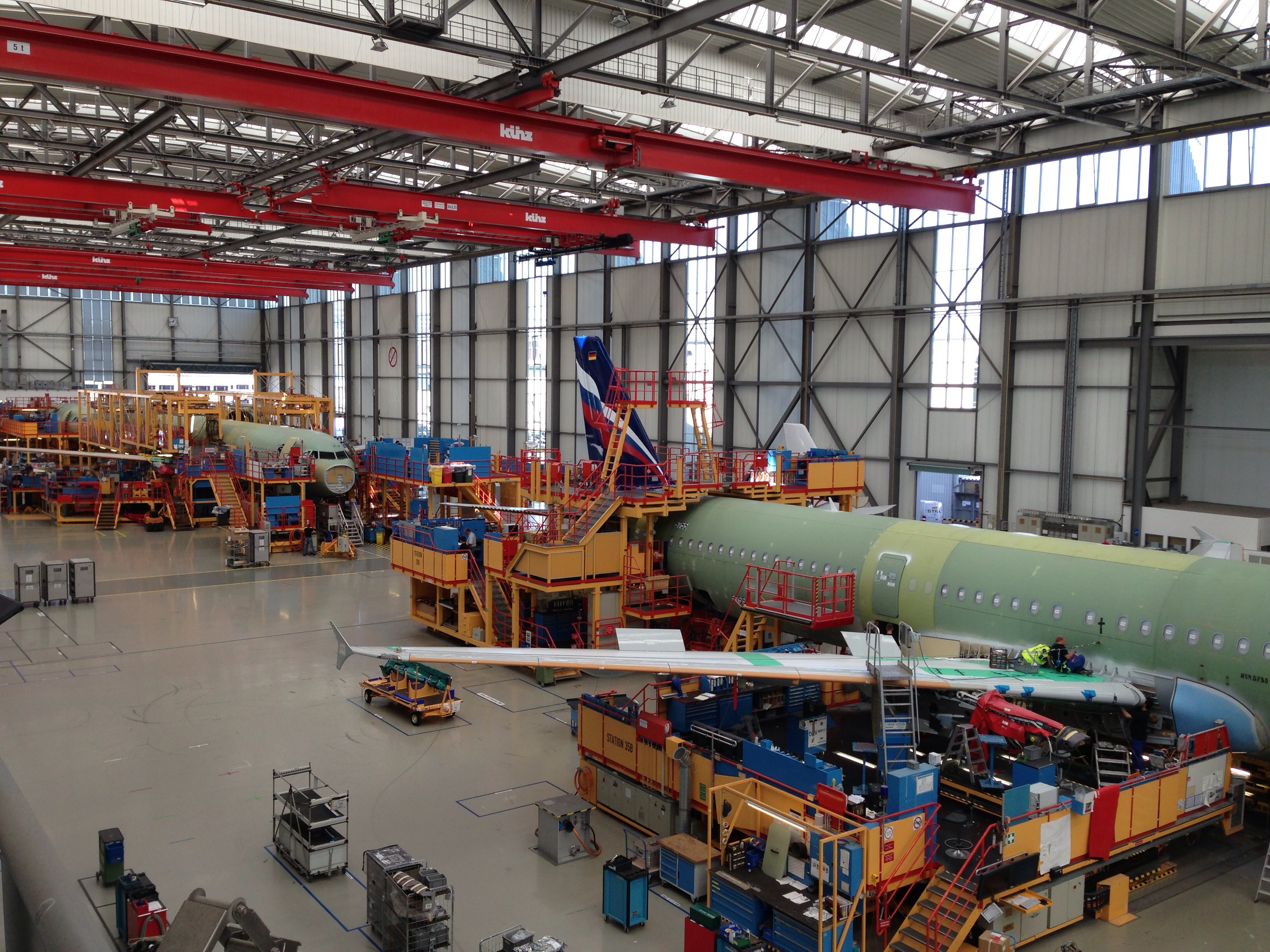
An Airbus A321 on final assembly line 3 in the Airbus Hamburg-Finkenwerder plant

The Toulouse Blagnac final assembly line builds A320s, whereas the Hamburg Finkenwerder final assembly line builds A318s, A319s, and A321s. The Airbus factory in Tianjin, China, assembles A319s, A320s, and A321s; A320s and A321s are also assembled at the Airbus Americas factory in Mobile, Alabama. Airbus produced a total of 42 A320s per month in 2015, and expected to increase to 50 per month in 2017.

Production of parts takes place in a large number of countries around the world. For example, the centre fuselage is made in Hamburg, Germany; the horizontal stabiliser is produced in Getafe, Spain.

As Airbus targets a 60 monthly global production rate by mid-2019, the Tianjin line delivered 51 in 2016 and it could assemble six per month from four as it starts producing A320neos in 2017; 147 Airbus were delivered in 2016 in China, 20% of its production, mostly A320-family, a 47% market share as the country should become the world's largest market ahead of the US before 2027.

In June 2018, along a larger and modernised delivery centre, Airbus inaugurated its fourth Hamburg production line, with two seven-axis robots to drill 80% of fuselage upper side holes and autonomous mobile tooling platforms, following Design Thinking principles. By January 2019, Mobile was outputting 4.5 A320s per month, raising to 5 by the end of the year.

In September 2019, Airbus reached a milestone with the delivery of the 9000th A320-family aircraft, to Easyjet. In October 2019, Airbus inaugurated a highly automated fuselage structure assembly line for A320 Family aircraft in Hamburg, showcasing an evolution in Airbus' industrial production system. Production rates continue to rise, and Airbus aims to reach a production rate of 63 aircraft per month by 2021, which would result in the 10,000th delivery occurring early that year.

Due to the impact of the COVID-19 pandemic on aviation, demand for new jets was reduced in 2020 and Airbus cut its monthly production from 60 to 40 A320s. In October 2020, the 500th A320 built in Tianjin, an A320neo, was delivered to China Southern, twelve years after the final assembly line start in 2008.

=== A320 Enhanced ===
In 2006, Airbus started the A320 Enhanced (A320E) programme as a series of improvements targeting a 4–5% efficiency gain, with large winglets (2%), aerodynamic refinements (1%), weight savings and a new aircraft cabin. Engine improvements that reduced fuel consumption by 1% were made to the A320 in 2007 with the CFM56 Tech Insertion and in 2008 with the V2500Select (One).

==== Sharklets ====
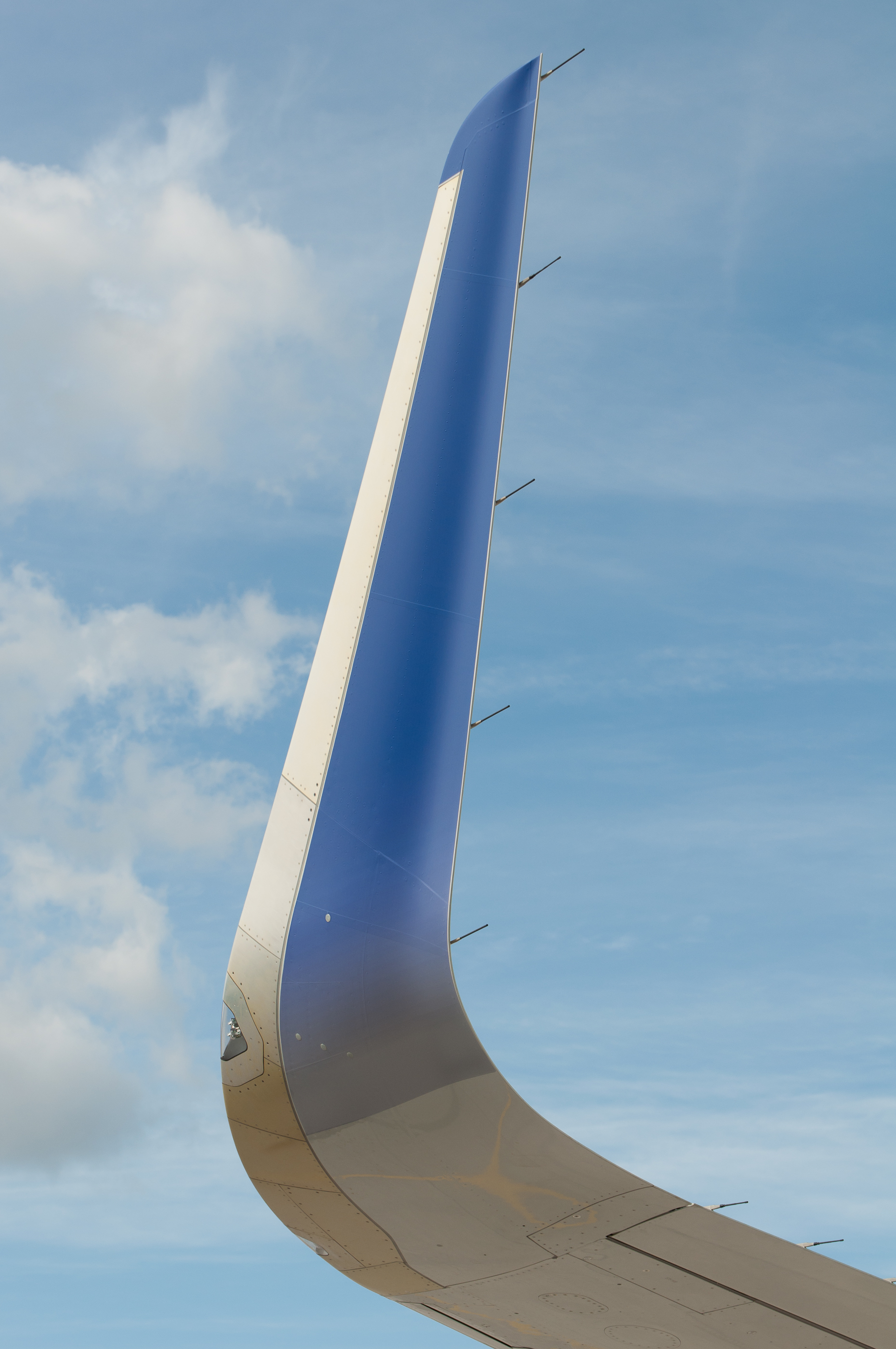
Wingtip sharklet

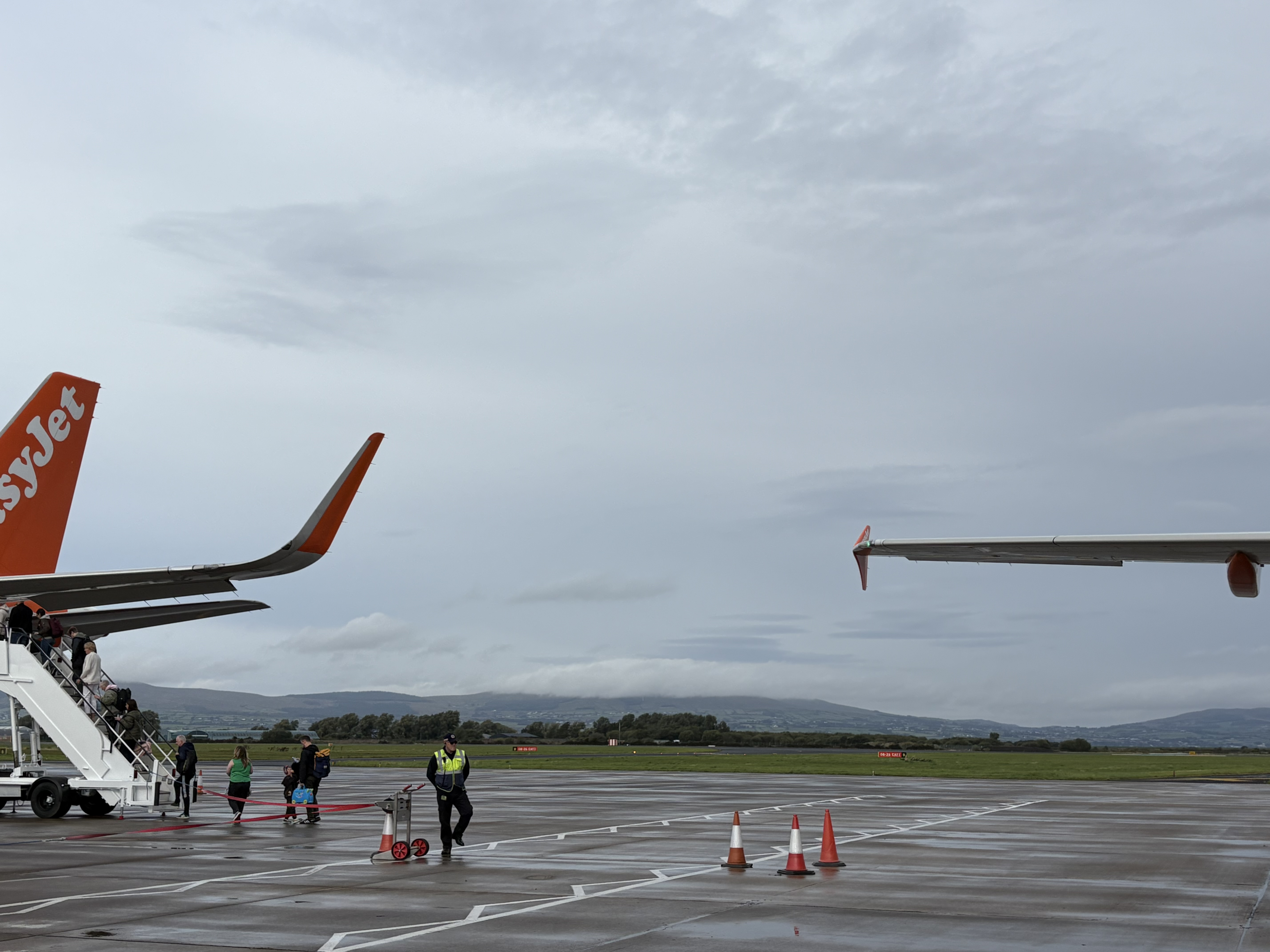
Comparison of wing tip designs on the A320 family. Left: Sharklet wing tip. Right: Wing Fence wingtip. Aircraft pictured are easyJet A320s.

In 2006, Airbus tested three styles of winglets intended to counteract the wing's lift-induced drag and wingtip vortices more effectively than the previous wingtip fence. The first design type to be tested was developed by Airbus and based on work done by the AWIATOR programme. The second type of winglet incorporated a more blended design and was designed by Winglet Technology, a company based in Wichita, Kansas, US. Two aircraft were used in the flight test evaluation campaign – the prototype A320, which had been retained by Airbus for testing, and a new build aircraft which was fitted with both types of winglets before it was delivered to JetBlue.

Despite the anticipated efficiency gains and development work, Airbus announced that those winglets would not be offered to customers, claiming that the weight of the modifications required negated any aerodynamic benefits. On 17 December 2008, Airbus announced it was to begin flight testing an existing blended winglet design developed by Aviation Partners Inc. as part of an A320 modernisation programme using the A320 prototype.

Airbus launched the sharklet blended winglets during the November 2009 Dubai Airshow. Installation adds 200 kg (440 lb) but offers a 3.5% fuel burn reduction on flights over 2,800 km (1,500 nmi; 1,700 mi), saving approximately US$220,000 and 700 t of CO_{2} per aircraft per year. The 2.5-metre-tall (8 ft 2 in) wingtip devices are manufactured by Korean Air Aerospace Division.

In December 2011, Airbus filed suit in the western district of Texas over Aviation Partners' claims of infringement of its patents on winglet design and construction which were granted in 1993. Airbus' lawsuit sought to reject responsibility to pay royalties to Aviation Partners for using its designs, despite work performed together with both parties to develop advanced winglets for the Airbus A320neo. The lawsuit was confidentially settled in 2018, with the result that Airbus paid a large but undisclosed settlement.

The first sharklet-equipped Airbus A320 was delivered to Indonesia AirAsia on 21 December 2012, offering a 450 kg (990 lb) payload and 190 km (100 nmi; 120 mi) range increases over the original aircraft specifications.

==== Cabin ====
In 2007, Airbus introduced a new enhanced, quieter cabin with better luggage storage and a more modern look and feel, and a new galley that reduced weight, increased revenue space and improved ergonomics and design for food hygiene and recycling. It offered a new air purifier with filters and a catalytic converter, removing unpleasant smells from the air before it is pumped into the cabin, as well as LEDs for mood lighting and a new passenger service unit (PSU).

Offering 10% more overhead bin volume, more shoulder room, a weight reduction, a new intercom and in-flight entertainment system, noise reduction and slimmer PSU, the enhanced cabin can be retrofitted. The flight crew controls the cabin through touchscreen displays.

=== Second generation (NEO: New Engine Option) ===
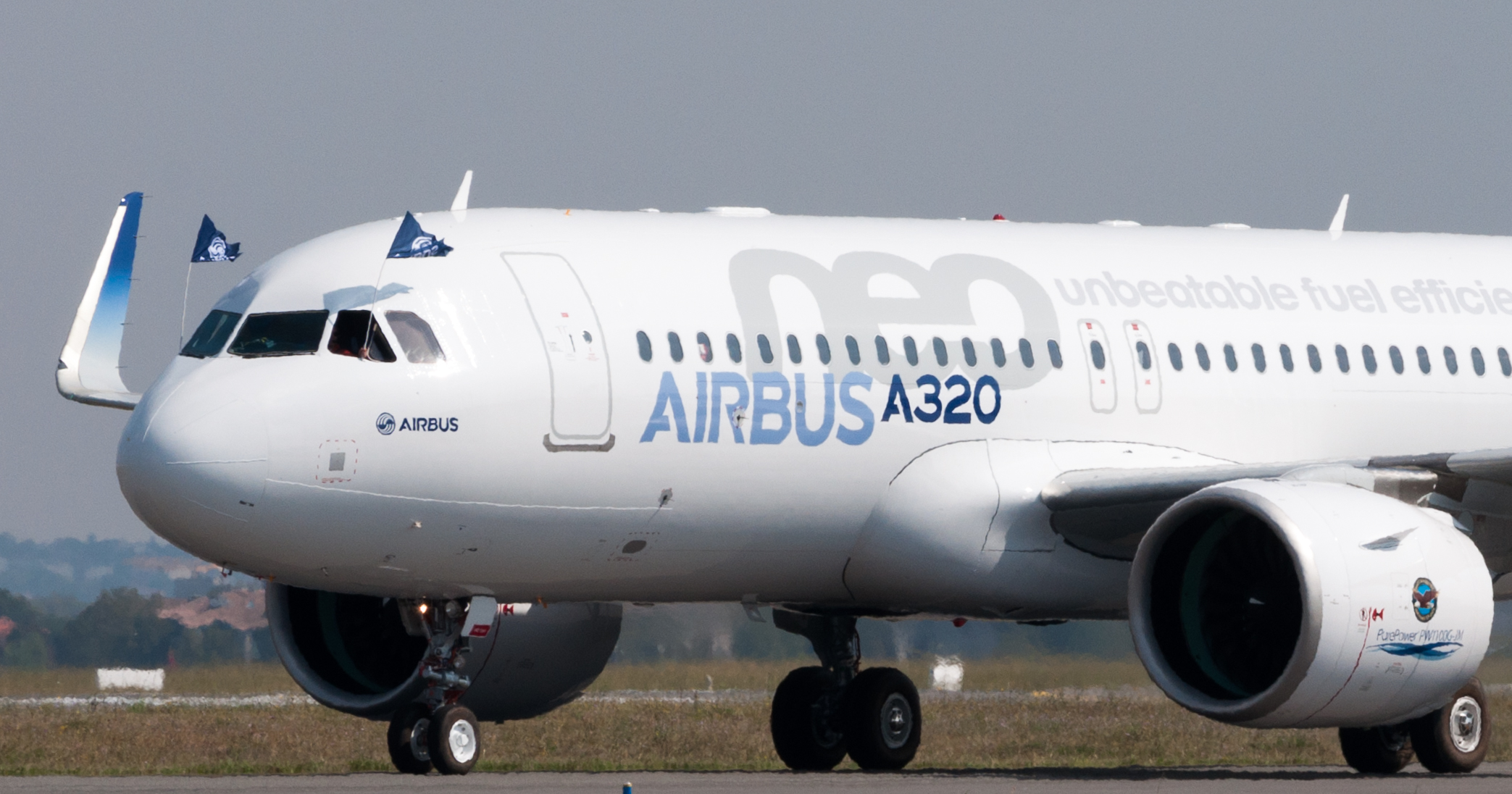
Airbus A320neo with larger engines and sharklets

The A320neo (neo for new engine option) is an incremental development launched on 1 December 2010, making its first flight on 25 September 2014 and introduced by Lufthansa on 25 January 2016. Re-engined with CFM International LEAP-1A or Pratt & Whitney PW1000G engines and with large sharklets, it was designed to be 15% more fuel efficient. Its three variants are based on the previous A319, A320 and A321. Airbus received 6,031 orders by March 2018 and delivered 318 by May 2018. The original family was renamed A320ceo, for current engine option. As of July 2024, IndiGo has 173 Airbus A320neos in service, making it the largest operator of this type of aircraft.

=== Replacement airliner ===
In 2006, Airbus was studying a future replacement for the A320 series, tentatively dubbed as NSR or "New Short-Range aircraft". The follow-on aircraft to replace the A320 was to be named A30X. In 2007, Airbus North America President Barry Eccleston stated that the earliest the aircraft could have been available was 2017. In January 2010, John Leahy, Airbus's chief operating officer-customers, stated that an all-new single-aisle aircraft was unlikely to be constructed before 2024 or 2025.

Airbus announced in July 2026 that it will test an A321neo with wing extensions as part of the "Wing of Tomorrow" programme, which is researching high-span wings for its next-generation single-aisle aircraft. Each extension will extend the wing by 4–5 metres (13–16 ft) on each side and replicate a folding wing in the fully-extended position. The flight testing will commence in the second half of 2027 and will last for about three years.

== Design ==
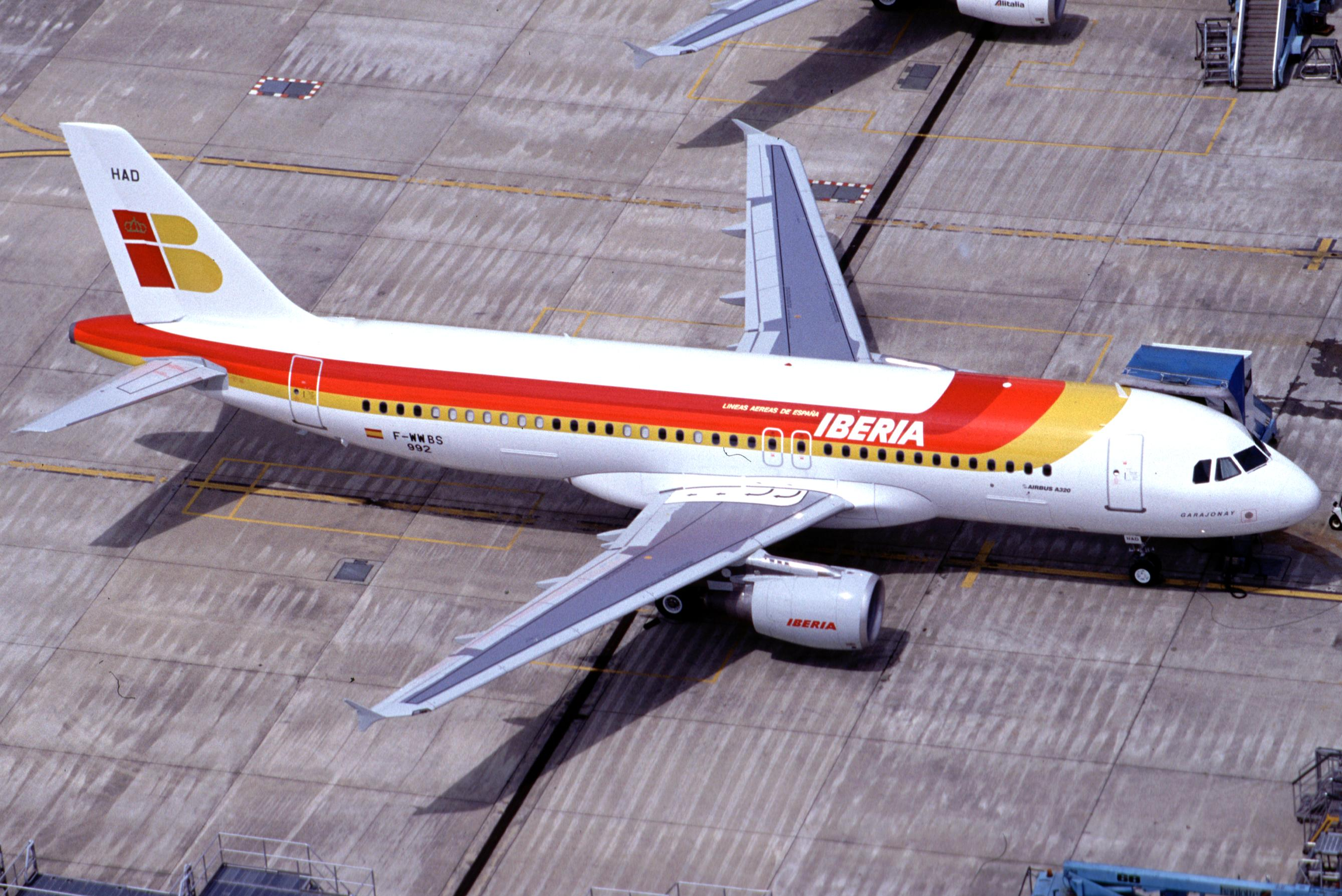
The Airbus A320 is a low-wing airliner with twin turbofans and a conventional tail.

The Airbus A320 family are narrow-body aircraft with a retractable tricycle landing gear and powered by two wing pylon-mounted turbofan engines. After the oil price rises of the 1970s, Airbus needed to minimise the trip fuel costs of the A320. To that end, it adopted composite primary structures for the empennage with a conventional tail configuration, centre-of-gravity control using fuel, a glass cockpit with side-stick controllers and a two-crew flight deck.

Airbus claimed the 737-300 burns 35% more fuel and has a 16% higher operating cost per seat than the V2500-powered A320. A 150-seat A320 burns 11,608 kg (25,591 lb) of jet fuel over 3,984 km (2,475 mi; 2,151 nmi) (between Los Angeles and New York City), or 2.43 L/100 km (97 mpg_{‑US}; 116 mpg_{‑imp}) per seat with a 0.8 kg/L fuel. Its wing is long and thin, offering better aerodynamic efficiency because of the higher aspect ratio than the competing 737 and MD-80.

=== Airframe ===
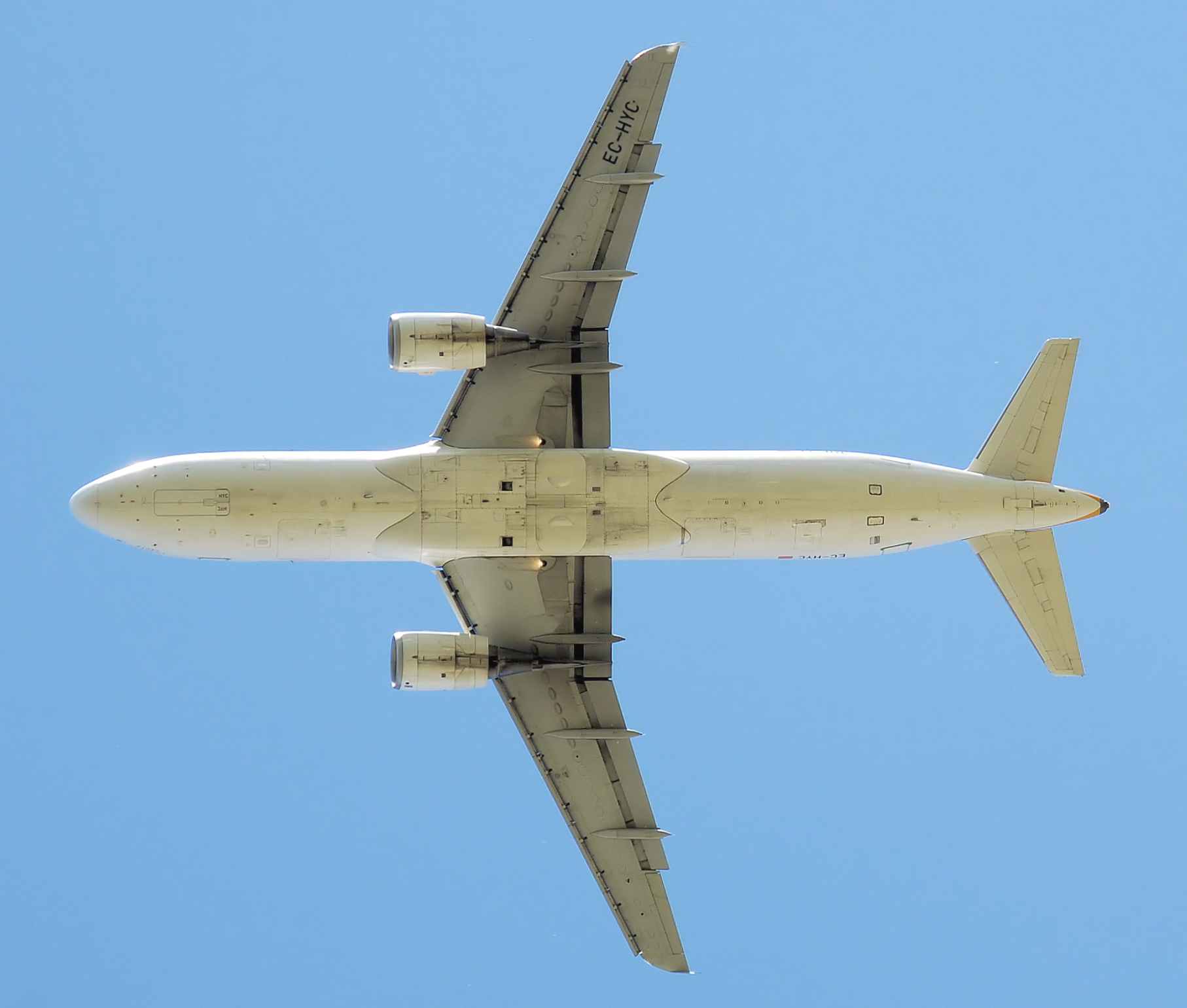
Planform view with flaps still partly extended, showing the 10.3 wing aspect ratio and 25° wing sweep

The Airbus A320 family are low-wing cantilever monoplanes with a conventional empennage with a single vertical stabiliser and rudder. Its wing sweep is 25 degrees. Compared to other airliners of the same class, the A320 features a wider single-aisle cabin of 3.95 metres (156 in) outside diameter, compared to the 3.8 m (148 in) of the Boeing 737 or 757, and larger overhead bins. Its cargo hold can accommodate unit load device containers.

The A320 airframe includes composite materials and aluminium alloys to save weight and reduce the total number of parts to decrease the maintenance costs. Its tail assembly is made almost entirely of such composites by CASA, which also builds the elevators, main landing gear doors, and rear fuselage parts.

=== Flight deck ===
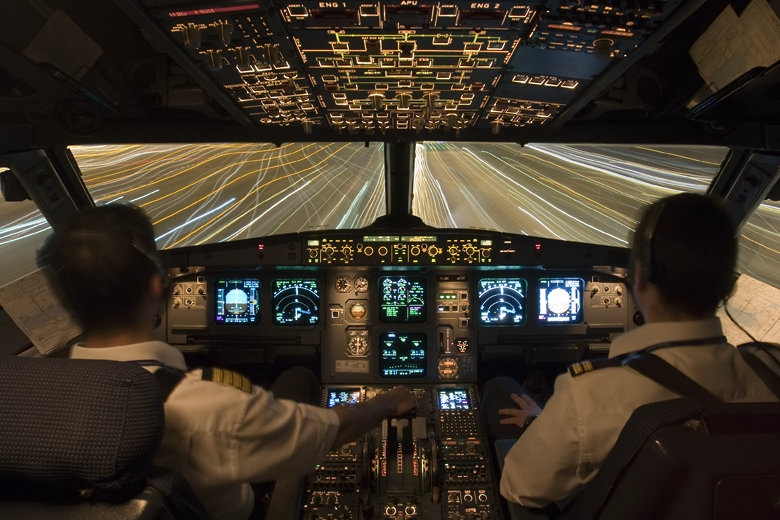
The A320 glass cockpit has fly-by-wire controls.

The A320 flight deck features a full glass cockpit, rather than the hybrid versions found in previous airliners. It is also equipped with an Electronic Flight Instrument System (EFIS) with side-stick controllers. The A320 has an Electronic Centralised Aircraft Monitor (ECAM) to give the flight crew information about all of the systems on the aircraft. The only analogue instruments were the radio-magnetic indicator and brake pressure indicator.

Since 2003, the A320 has featured liquid crystal display (LCD) units on the flight deck instead of the original cathode-ray tube (CRT) displays. These include both main displays and the backup artificial horizon, which also previously had an analogue display.

Airbus offers an avionics upgrade for older A320 aircraft, the In-Service Enhancement Package, to keep them updated. Digital head-up displays are also available.

The A320 retained the dark cockpit (where an indicator is off when its system is running; useful for drawing attention to dysfunctions when an indicator is lit) from the A310, the first widebody designed to be operated without a flight engineer and influenced by Bernard Ziegler, first Airbus CEO Henri Ziegler's son.

=== Fly-by-wire ===
The A320 is the world's first airliner with digital fly-by-wire (FBW) flight control system: input commands through the side-stick are interpreted by flight control computers and transmitted to flight control surfaces within the flight envelope protection; in the 1980s the computer-controlled dynamic system of the Dassault Mirage 2000 fighter cross-fertilised the Airbus team which tested FBW on an A300. At its introduction, fly-by-wire and flight envelope protection was a new experience for many pilots.

All following Airbuses have similar human/machine interface and systems control philosophy to facilitate cross-type qualification with minimal training. For Roger Béteille, then Airbus president, introducing fly-by-wire with flight envelope protection was one of the most difficult decisions he had ever made, explaining: "Either we were going to be first with new technologies or we could not expect to be in the market."

Early A320s used the Intel 80186 and Motorola 68010. In 1988, the flight management computer contained six Intel 80286 CPUs, running in three logical pairs, with 2.5 megabytes of memory.

=== Engines ===
The suppliers providing turbofan engines for the A320ceo family were CFM International with the CFM56, International Aero Engines offering its V2500, and Pratt & Whitney's PW6000 engines available only for the A318, while for the A320neo family are CFM International LEAP-1A or Pratt & Whitney PW1000G engines.

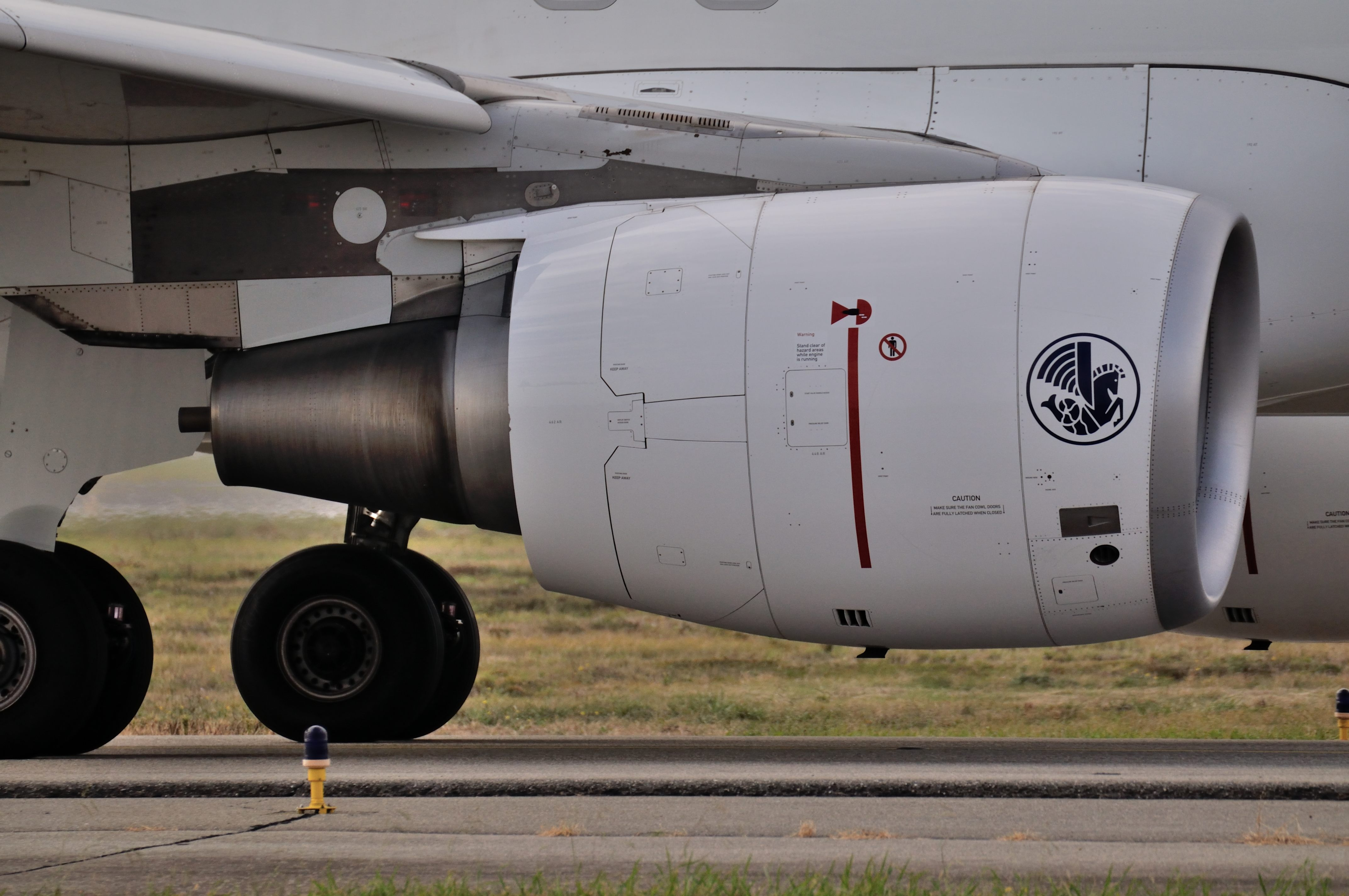
The CFM56, with unmixed exhaust, is available on all variants.

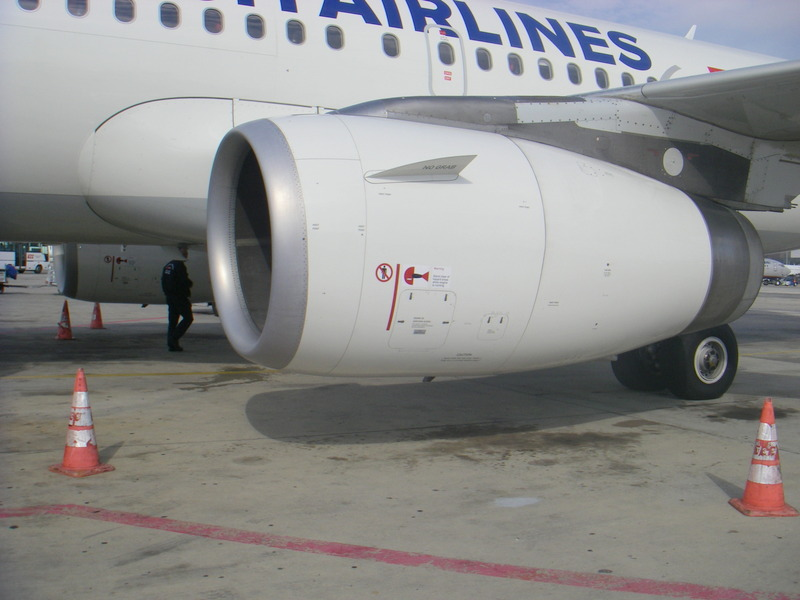
The IAE V2500, with mixed exhaust, equips the larger variants.

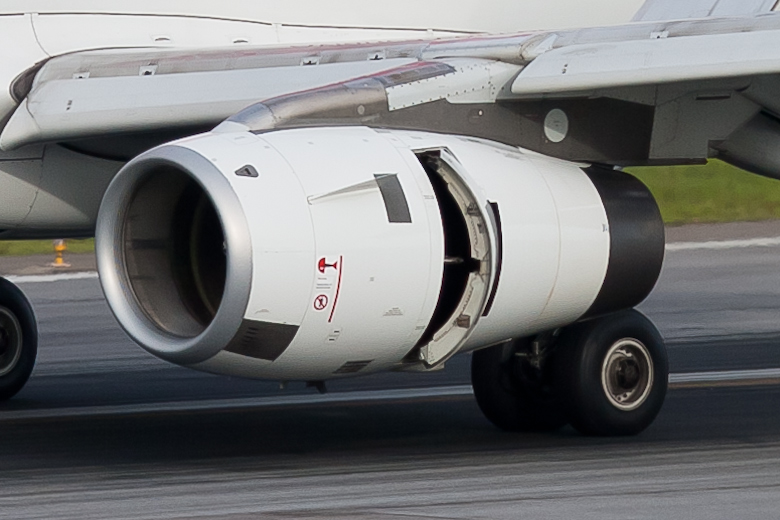
The PW6000 is available on the smallest A318.

== Operational history ==
The Joint Aviation Authorities (JAA) issued the type certificate for the A320 on 26 February 1988. After entering the market on 18 April 1988 with Air France, Airbus then expanded the A320 family rapidly, launching the 185-seat A321 in 1989 and first delivered it in 1994; launching the 124-seat A319 in 1993 and delivering it in 1996; and launching the 107-seat A318 in 1999 with first deliveries in 2003.

As of March 2024, the global A320 fleet had 99.7 per cent operational reliability in the last 12 months and completed more than 176 million flights over 328 million block hours since its entry into service.

After an incident where JetBlue Flight 1230 experienced a rapid descent when solar radiation inadvertently corrupted flight data on 30 October 2025, Airbus and EASA issued a mandatory safety notice at the end of November for over 6,000 aircraft, over half of the family's fleet. Most only required a patch reverting the flight control software for the aircraft's elevators that could be completed in three hours, while about 900 with older software needed a replacement of onboard hardware. The impact on airline operations was relatively minor; although there were some delays, most airlines were able to complete the change within three days. Avianca notably suffered bigger impacts as it had upgraded 92% of its aircraft to the software version that it had to roll back from, resulting in the airline closing ticket sales until 8 December. The update has been cited as a contributing factor to the major 2025 IndiGo disruption.

=== Competition ===
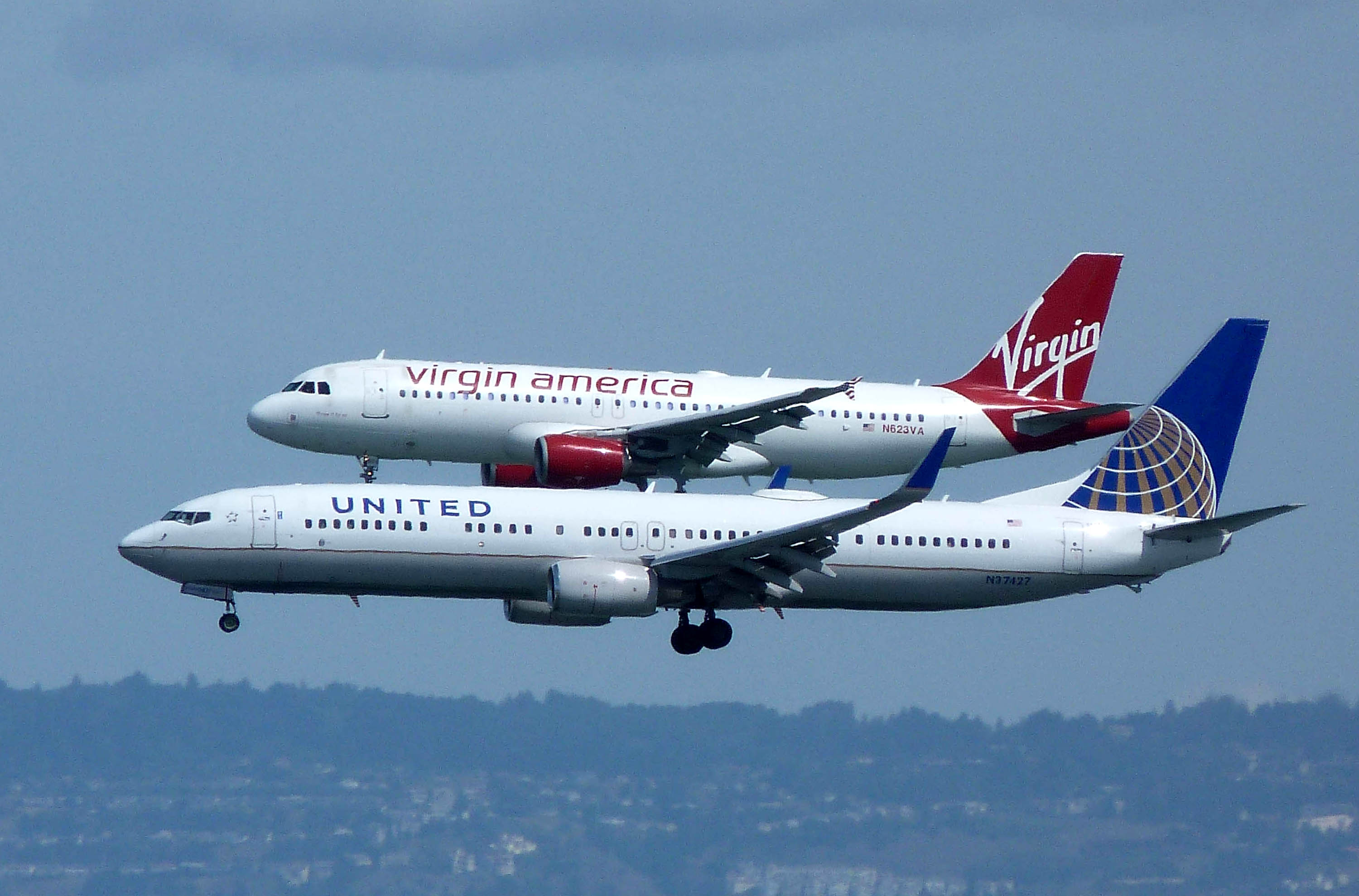
The main competition of the A320 family (background) is the Boeing 737 Next Generation (foreground).

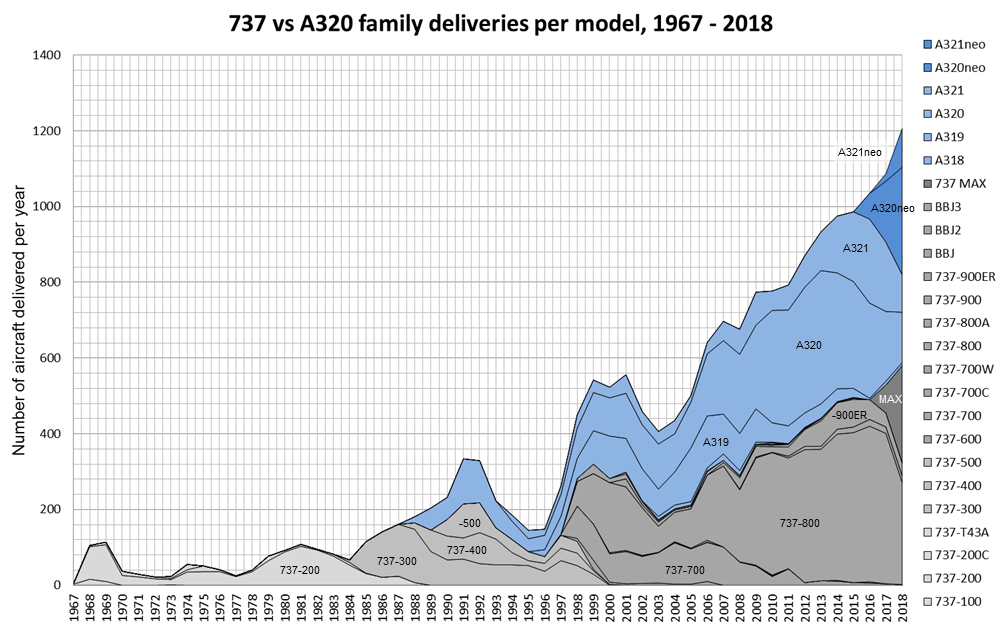
737 vs A320 family deliveries per model 1967–2018

The A320 family was developed to compete with the Boeing 737 Classics (−300/-400/-500) and the McDonnell Douglas MD-80/90 series, and has since faced challenges from the Boeing 737 Next Generation (−600/-700/-800/-900) and the 717 during its two decades in service. As of 2010, the A320 family also faced competition from Embraer's E-195 (to the A318) and the CSeries being developed by Bombardier (later Airbus A220) to the A318/A319.

Airbus has delivered 8,605 A320 family aircraft since their certification/first delivery in early 1988, with another 6,056 on firm order (as of 31 December 2018). In comparison, Boeing has shipped 10,444 737-series aircraft since late 1967, including 8,918 since March 1988, and has a further 4,763 on firm order (as of 31 December 2018).

By September 2018, there were 7,251 A320ceo family aircraft in service versus 6,757 737NGs, while Airbus expected to deliver 3,174 A320neos compared with 2,999 Boeing 737 MAX through 2022. Airbus sold the A320 well to low-cost startups and offering a choice of engines could make them more attractive to airlines and lessors than the single-sourced 737, but CFM engines are extremely reliable. The six-month head start of the A320neo allowed Airbus to rack up 1,000 orders before Boeing announced the MAX. The A321 has outsold the 737-900 three to one, as the A321neo is again dominating the 737-9 MAX, to be joined by the 737-10 MAX.

=== Maintenance ===
A Checks are every 750 flight hours and structural inspections are at 6 and 12-year intervals.

== Variants ==
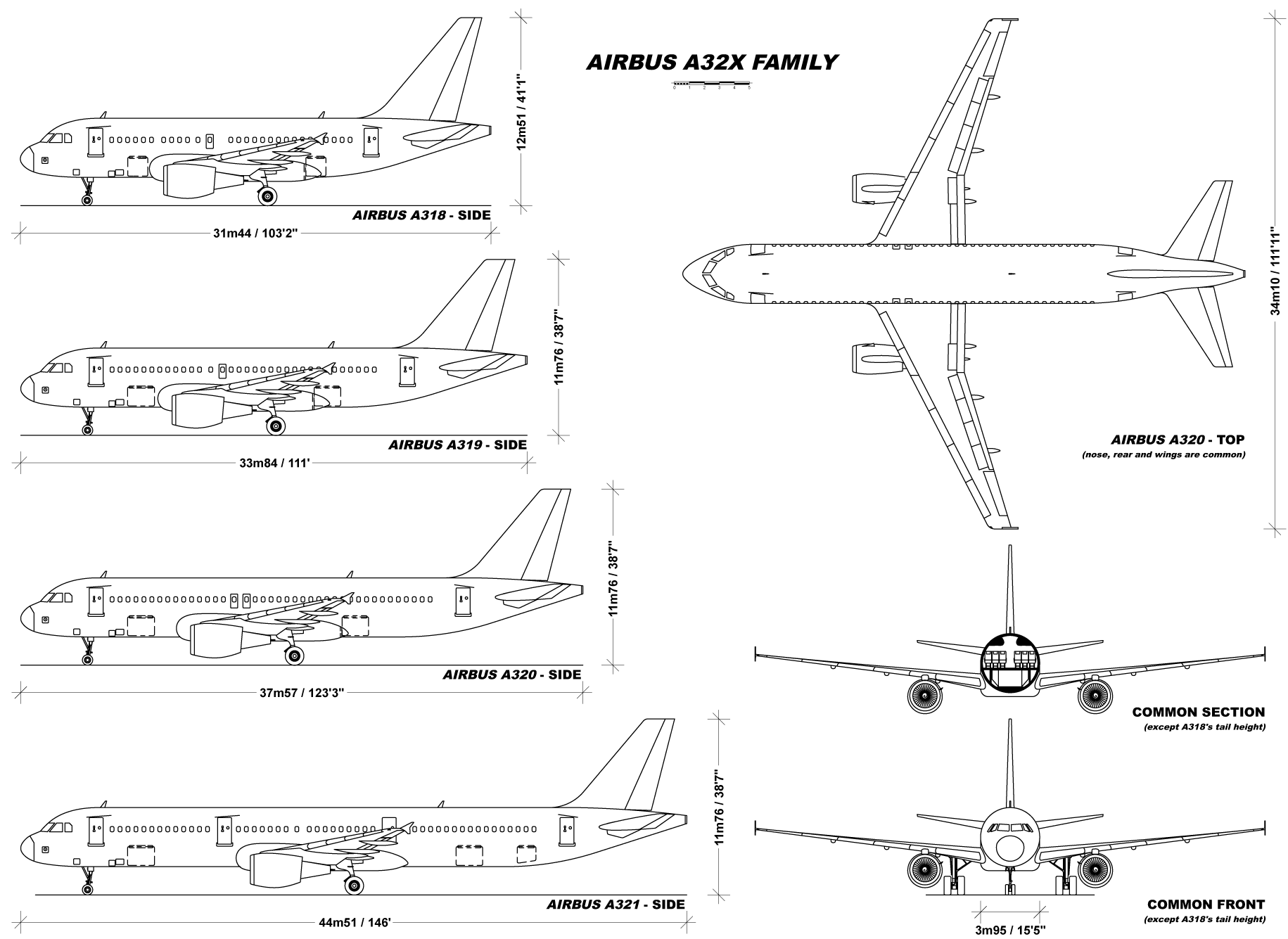
Airbus A32X family

The baseline A320 has given rise to a family of aircraft which share a common design but with passenger capacity ranges from 100, on the A318, to 220, on the A321. They compete with the 737, 757, and 717. Because the four A320 variants share the same flight deck, all have the same pilot type rating. Today all variants are available as corporate jets. An A319 variant known as A319LR was also developed. Military versions like A319 MPA also exist. American Airlines is the largest airline operator of the A320 family of aircraft, with 392 aircraft in service as of 30 September 2017.

Technically, the name "A320" only refers to the original mid-sized aircraft, but it is often informally used to indicate any of the A318/A319/A320/A321 family. All variants have had 180-minute ETOPS (extended-range twin-engine operational performance standards) certification capacity since 2004 (EASA) and 2006 (FAA).

=== A318 ===
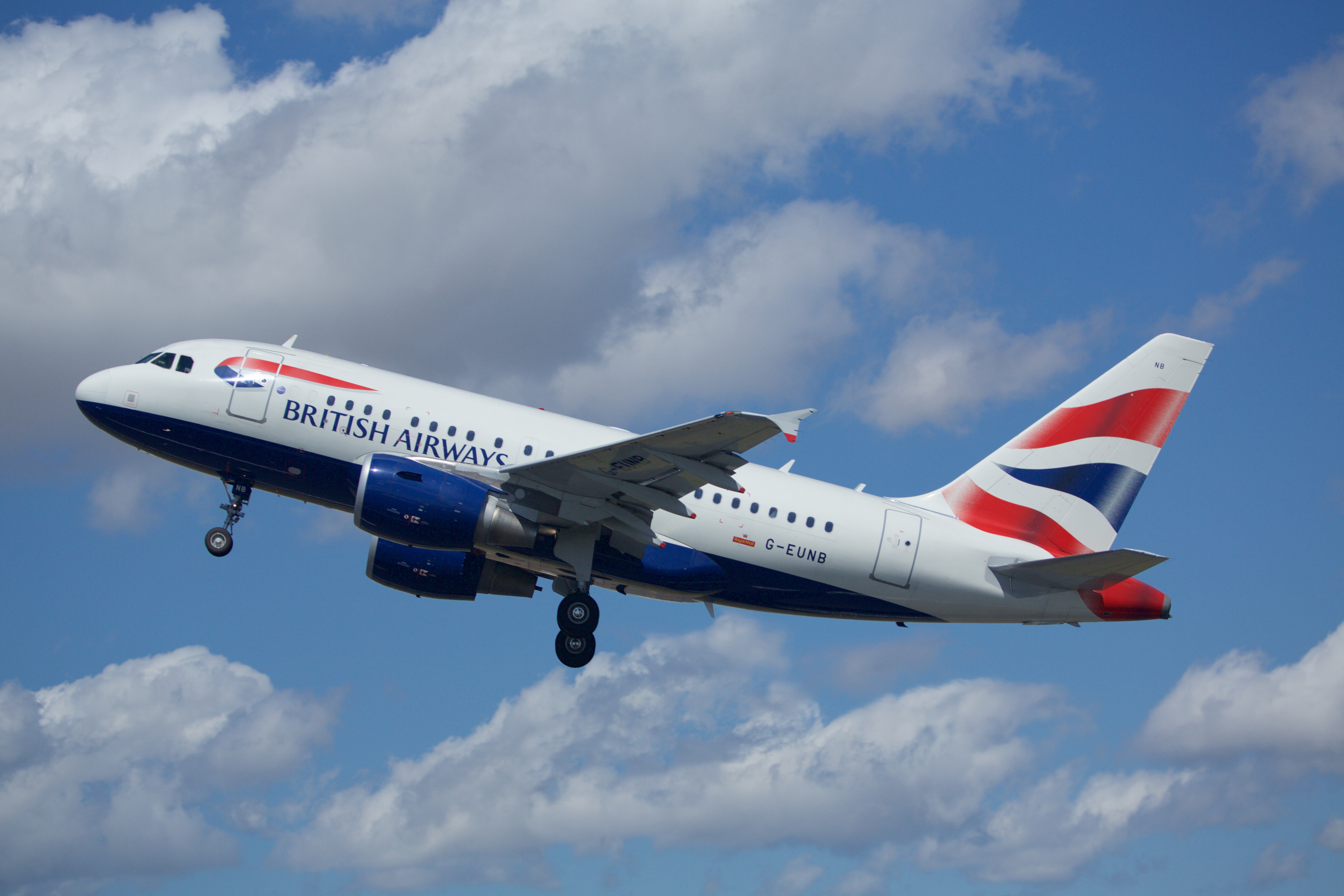
The 31.44 m (103.1 ft) long A318 is the shortest variant, here in the livery of British Airways.

The Airbus A318 is the smallest member of the Airbus A320 family. The A318 carries up to 132 passengers and has a maximum range of 5,700 km (3,600 mi; 3,100 nmi). The aircraft entered service in July 2003 with Frontier Airlines, and shares a common type rating with all other Airbus A320 family variants, allowing existing A320 family pilots to fly the aircraft without the need for further training. It is the largest commercial aircraft certified by the European Aviation Safety Agency for steep approach operations, allowing flights at airports such as London City Airport. Relative to other Airbus A320 family variants, the A318 has sold in only small numbers with total orders for only 80 aircraft placed as of 31 October 2015. In 2018, the A318 list price was US$77.4 million.

=== A319 ===
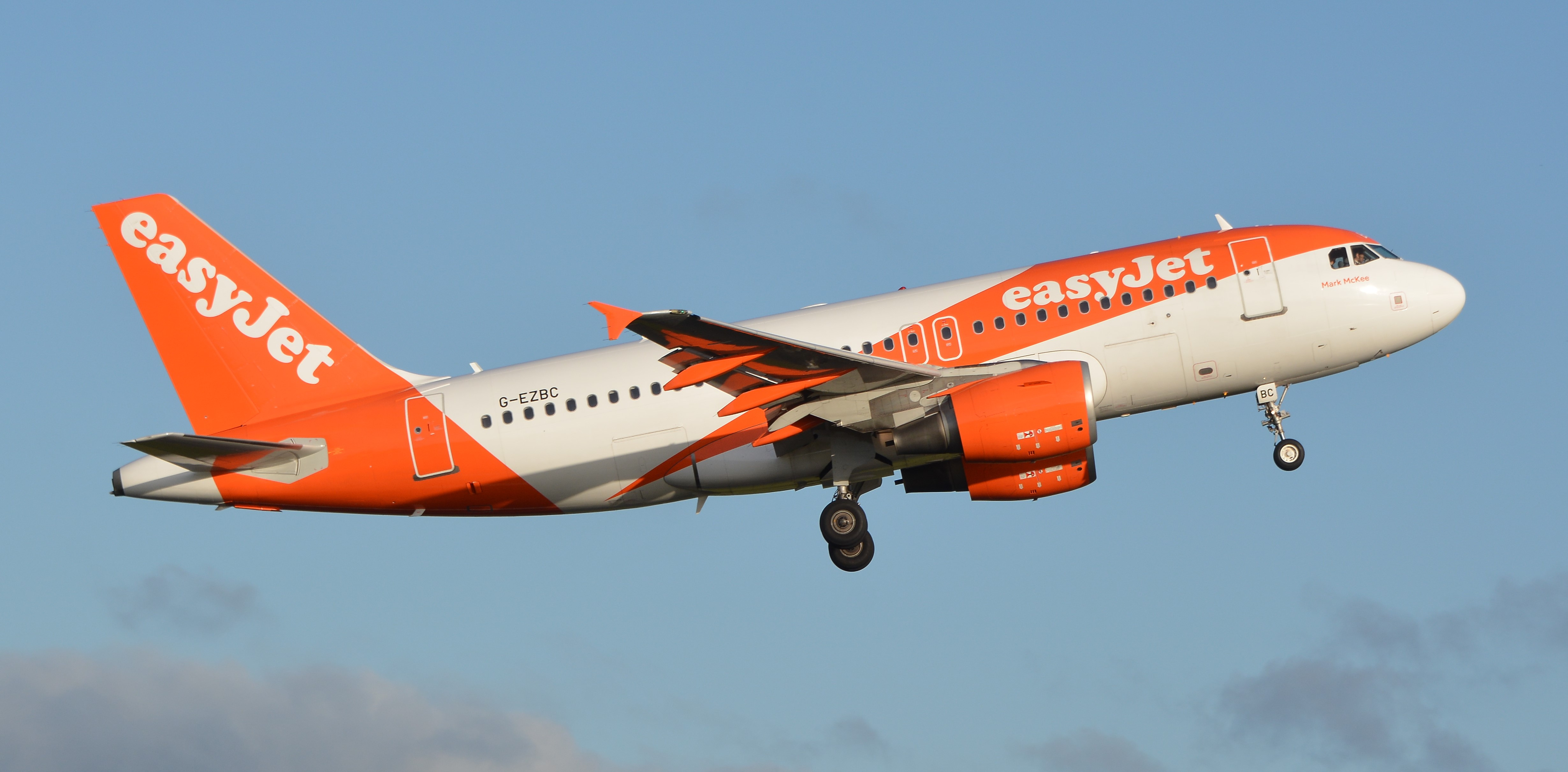
The A319 is 3.73 m (12 ft 3 in) shorter than the A320, as seen on this EasyJet aircraft.

The A319 is 3.73 m (12 ft 3 in) shorter than the A320. Also known as the A320M-7, it is a shortened, minimum-change version of the A320 with four frames fore of the wing and three frames aft of the wing removed. With a similar fuel capacity as the A320-200 and fewer passengers, the range with 124 passengers in a two-class configuration extends to 6,650 km (3,590 nmi; 4,130 mi), or 6,850 km (3,700 nmi; 4,260 mi) with the "sharklets". Four propulsion options available on the A319 are the 23,040–24,800 lbf (102.5–110.3 kN) IAE V2500, or the 22,000–27,000 lbf (98–120 kN) CFM56. Although identical to those of the A320, these engines are derated because of the A319's lower MTOW. When configured with a single overwing exit per side, seating capacity is limited to 145, while this is increased to 160 with two overwing exits.

The A319 was developed at the request of ILFC. The A319's launch customer, in fact, was ILFC, which had placed an order for six A319s by 1993. Anticipating further orders by Swissair and Alitalia, Airbus decided to launch the programme on 10 June 1993. Final assembly of the first A319 began on 23 March 1995 and it was first introduced with Swissair in April 1996. The direct Boeing competitor is the Boeing 737-700.

A total of 1,460 of the A319ceo model have been delivered with 24 remaining on order as of 30 September 2017. A 1998 A319 was $35 million new; the value was halved by 2009, and reached scrap levels by 2019. In 2018, the A319 list price was US$92.3 million.

==== ACJ319 ====
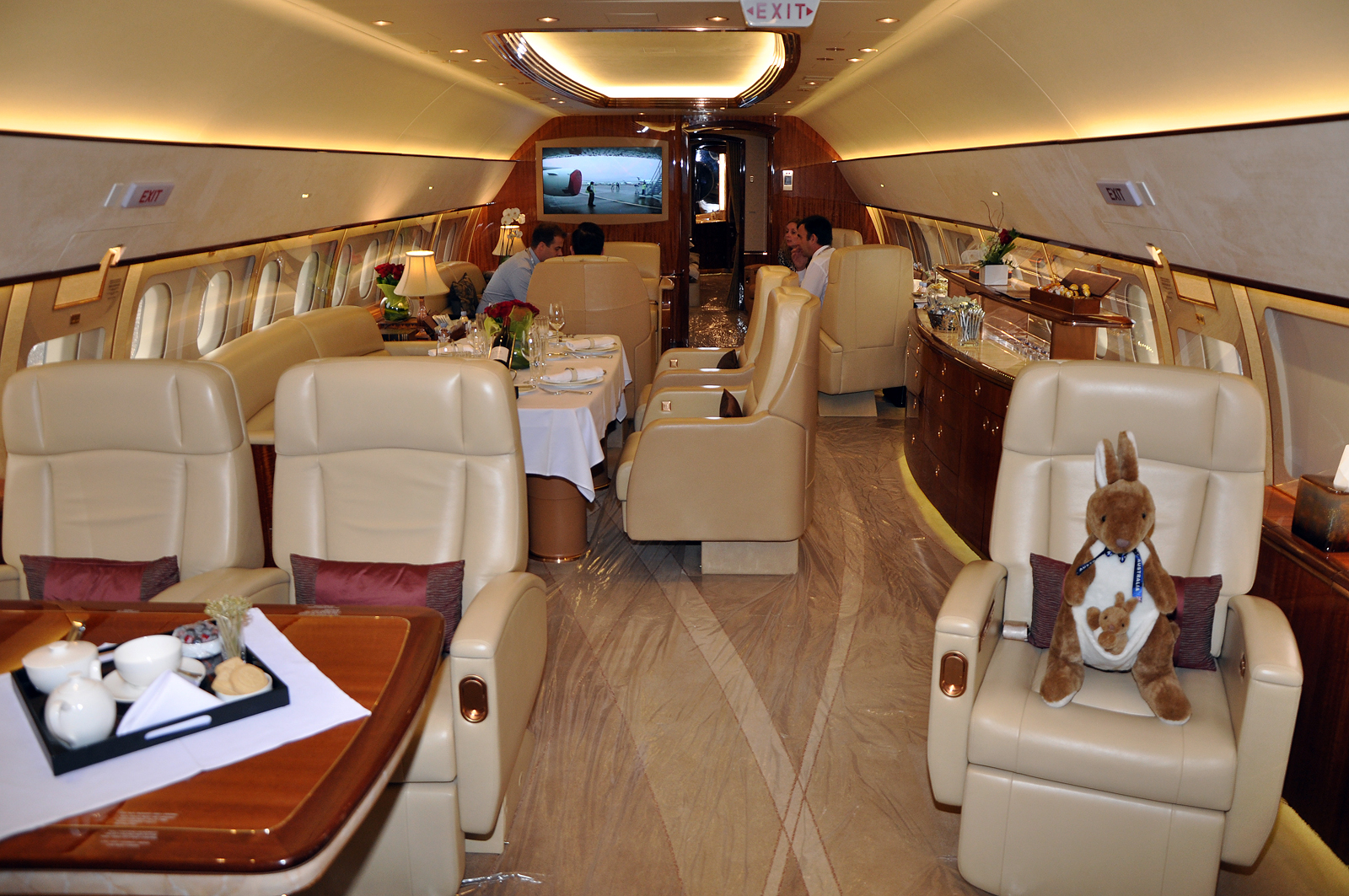
An ACJ319 cabin

The A319CJ (rebranded the ACJ319) is the corporate jet version of the A319. It incorporates removable extra fuel tanks (up to six additional centre tanks) which are installed in the cargo compartment, and an increased service ceiling of 12,500 m (41,000 ft). Range with eight passengers' payload and auxiliary fuel tanks (ACTs) is up to 6,000 nautical miles (11,000 km; 6,900 mi). Upon resale, the aircraft can be reconfigured as a standard A319 by removing its extra tanks and corporate cabin outfit, thus maximising its resale value. It was formerly also known as the ACJ, or Airbus Corporate Jet, while starting with 2014 it has the marketing designation ACJ319.

The aircraft seats up to 39 passengers, but may be outfitted by the customers into any configuration. Tyrolean Jet Services Mfg. GmbH & CO KG, MJET and Reliance Industries are among its users. The A319CJ competes with other ultralarge-cabin corporate jets such as the Boeing 737-700-based Boeing Business Jet (BBJ) and Embraer Lineage 1000, as well as with large-cabin and ultralong-range Gulfstream G650, Gulfstream G550 and Bombardier's Global 6000. It is powered by the same engine types as the A320. The A319CJ was used by the Escadron de Transport, d'Entraînement et de Calibration which is in charge of transportation for France's officials and also by the Flugbereitschaft of the German Air Force for transportation of Germany's officials. An ACJ serves as a presidential or official aircraft of Armenia, Azerbaijan, Brazil, Bulgaria, Czech Republic, Germany, Italy, Malaysia, Slovakia, Thailand, Turkey, Ukraine, and Venezuela.

=== A320 ===
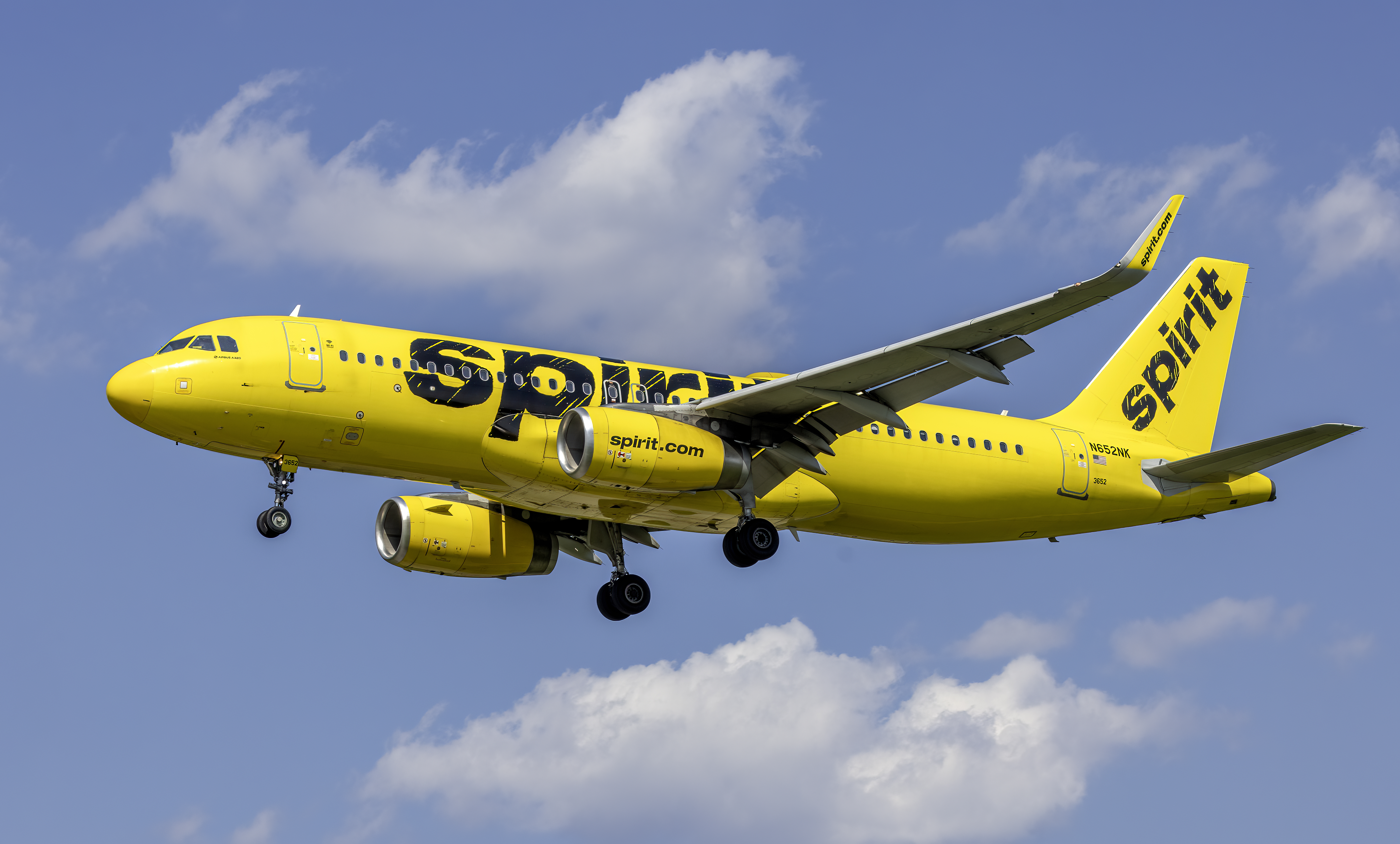
A Spirit Airlines A320-200 with sharklets

The A320 series has two variants, the A320-100 and A320-200. Only 21 A320-100s were produced. These aircraft, the first to be manufactured, were delivered to Air Inter – later acquired by Air France – and British Airways as a result of an order from British Caledonian made prior to its acquisition. The primary differences from the -100 were the -200's wingtip fences and increased fuel capacity, providing increased range.

Powered by two CFM56-5s or IAE V2500s with thrust ratings of 98–120 kN (22,000–27,000 lbf), the A320's typical range with 150 passengers is 6,100 km (3,800 mi; 3,300 nmi). A total of 4,512 of the A320ceo model have been delivered, with 220 remaining on order as of 30 September 2017. The closest Boeing competitor was the Boeing 737-800.

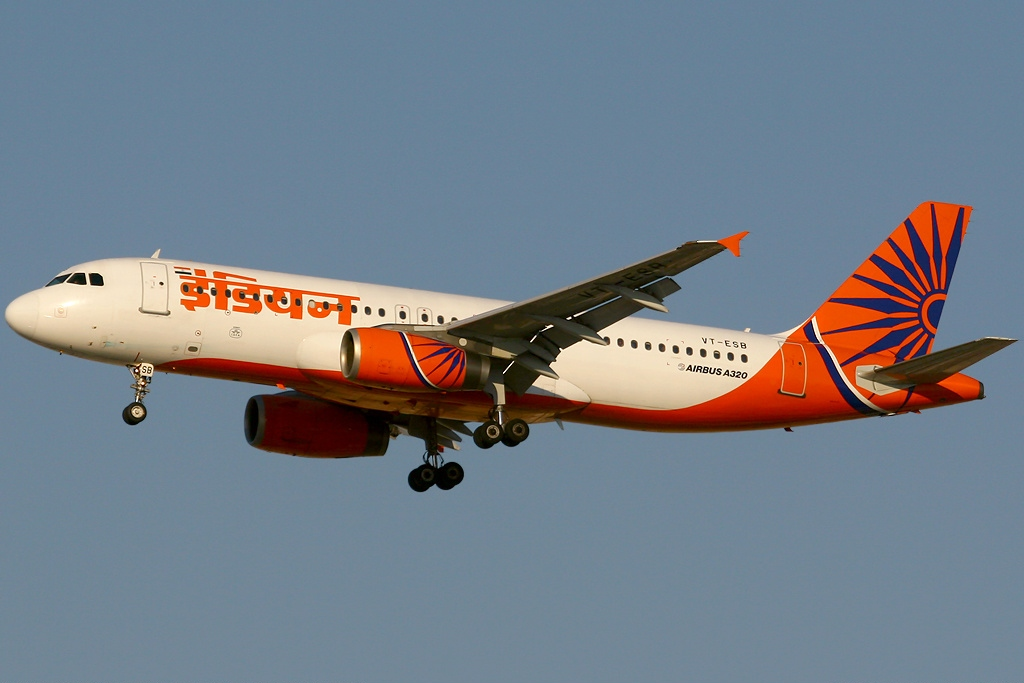
An Indian Airlines A320 with double-bogie main landing gear

Indian Airlines purchased 31 double-bogie variants which had an extra set of wheels to spread weight over wider space at more basic airstrips.

In 1988, the value of a new A320 was $30 million, reaching $40 million by the end of the 1990s, a 30% increase lower than inflation; it dipped to $37 million after 2001, then peaked to $47 million in 2008, and stabilised at $40–42 million until the transition to the A320neo. In 2018, its list price was US$101.0 million.

=== A321 ===
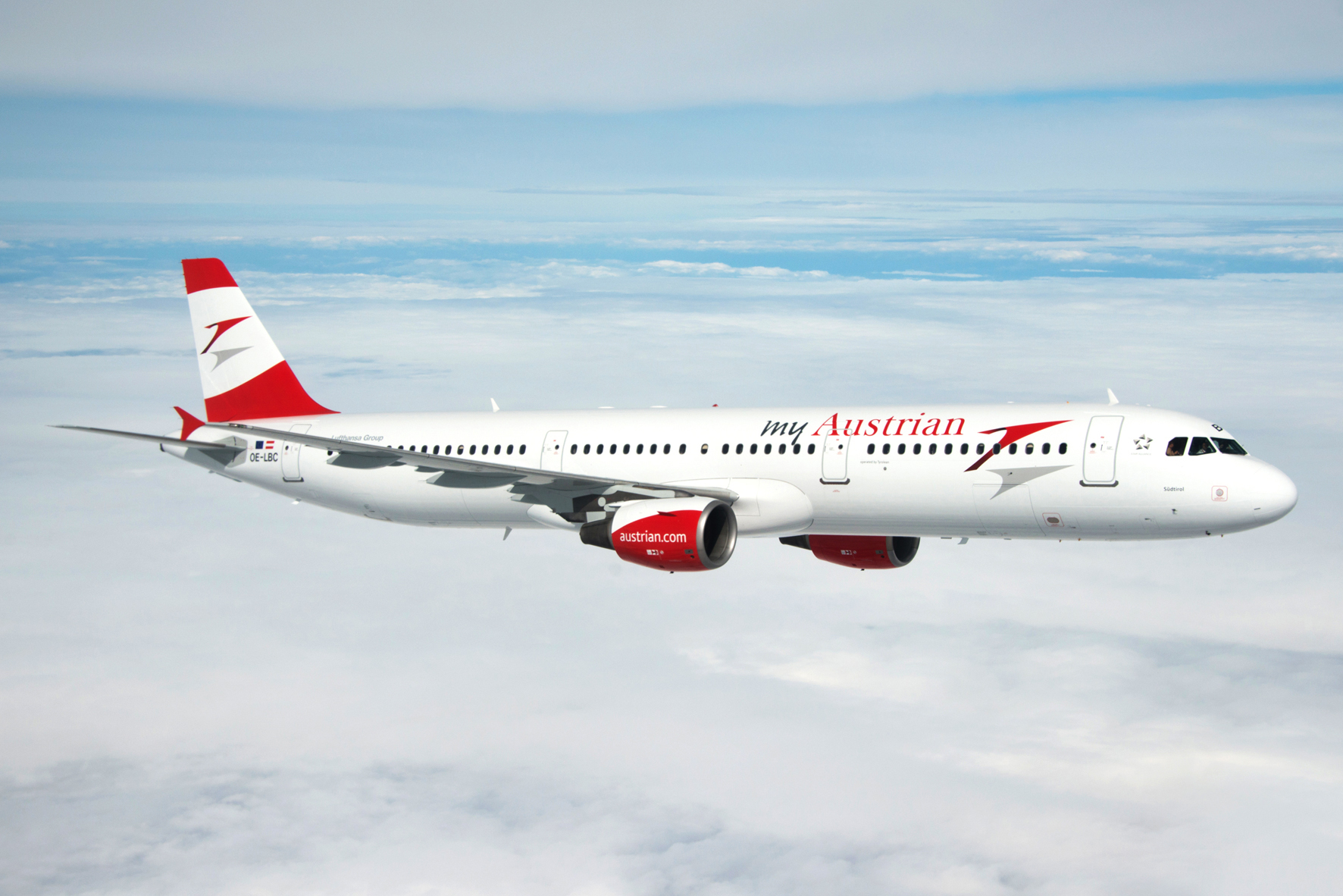
The A321 is 6.93 m (22 ft 9 in) longer than the A320; overwing exits are replaced by doors.

As the A320 was beginning operations in 1988, the A321 was launched as its first derivative the same year. The A321 fuselage is stretched by 6.93 metres (22 ft 9 in), with a 4.27 m (14 ft 0 in) front plug immediately forward of wing and a 2.67 m (8 ft 9 in) rear plug. The A321-100 maximum takeoff weight is increased by 9,600 kg (21,200 lb) to 83,000 kg (183,000 lb). To maintain performance, double-slotted flaps were included, in addition to increasing the wing area by 4 m^{2} (43 sq ft), to 128 m^{2} (1,380 sq ft). The maiden flight of the first of two prototypes came on 11 March 1993. The A321-100 entered service in January 1994 with Lufthansa.

As the A321-100 range was less than the A320, development of the heavier and longer range A321-200 began in 1995. The higher range was achieved through higher thrust engines (V2533-A5 or CFM56-5B3), minor structural strengthening, and an increase in fuel capacity with the installation of one or two optional 2,990 L (790 US gal; 660 imp gal) tanks in the rear underfloor hold. Its fuel capacity was increased to 30,030 L (7,930 US gal; 6,610 imp gal) and its maximum takeoff weight to 93,000 kg (205,000 lb). It first flew in December 1996 and entered service with Monarch Airlines in April 1997.

The A321's closest Boeing competitors are the 737-900/900ER, and the 757-200. In 2018, the A321 list price was US$118.3 million. A total 1,784 units of the A321ceo model have been delivered, with seven remaining on order as of 30 September 2023.

== Conversions ==
=== Civilian variants ===
==== Passenger-to-freighter (P2F) ====
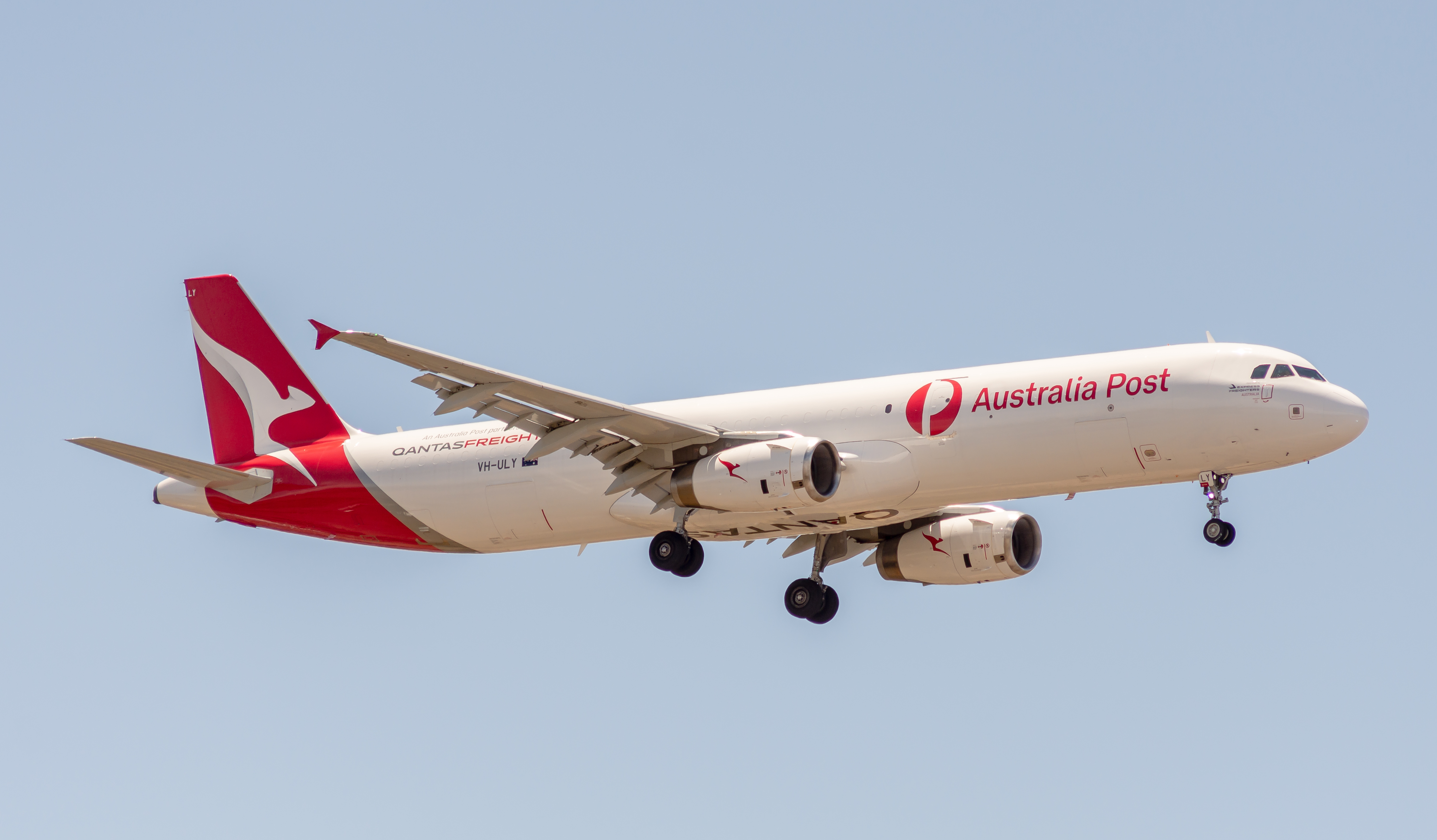
Airbus A321P2F of Australia Post

A programme to convert A320 and A321 aircraft into freighters was set up by Airbus Freighter Conversion GmbH. Airframes were to be converted by Elbe Flugzeugwerke GmbH (EFW) in Dresden, Germany, and Zhukovsky, Russia. Launch customer AerCap signed a firm contract on 16 July 2008 to convert 30 of its passenger A320/A321s into A320/A321P2F (passenger to freighter). However, on 3 June 2011, Airbus announced all partners would end the passenger-to-freighter programme, citing high demand on used airframes for passenger service. Finally, on 17 June 2015 ST Aerospace signed agreements with Airbus and EFW for a collaboration to launch the A320/A321 passenger-to-freighter (P2F) conversion programme.

A321P2F

In August 2019, Qantas was announced as launch operator for the A321P2F converted freighter. Titan Airways received its first of three A321P2F in January 2021.

The initial converted aircraft first flew on 22 January 2020, to be delivered to Vallair, and secured EASA supplementary type certificate in February. It was to replace older converted Boeing 757s with 14 main deck and 10 lower deck positions, carrying up to 27.9 t (62,000 lb) over 4,300 km (2,600 mi; 2,300 nmi). Airbus sees a market for 1,000 narrowbody conversions over the 2020-2040 period. On 27 October 2020, the first A321P2F was delivered to Qantas Airways, with windows and exit doors removed, and a large hydraulically actuated main cargo door installed.

A320P2F

After EFW began the first A320 conversion in March 2021, the A320P2F made its maiden three-hour flight on 8 December from Singapore. The aircraft was first delivered in 2006, and its first cargo operator was to be Nairobi-based Astral Aviation from the second quarter of 2022, leased from Middle Eastern lessor Vaayu Group. The A320P2F received its supplemental type certification at the end of March 2022.

The A320P2F is suitable for express domestic as well as regional operations and can accommodate up to 27 tonnes (60,000 lb) over 3,500 kilometres (2,200 mi; 1,900 nmi), offering space for 14 large containers/pallets on the main deck and 10 LD3-type containers on the lower deck.

=== Military variants ===
DRDO AEW&CS (Airborne Early Warning and Control System)

In late 2020, the Indian Defence Ministry greenlit the modification of six Air India A320s into Netra Mk2 airborne early warning and control aircraft for ₹105 billion (US$1.42 billion). They were to complement two Indian-built Netra and three Israeli-and-Russian-made Phalcons of the Indian Air Force.

DRDO SCA (Signals Intelligence and Communication Jamming Aircraft)

In 2019, the DRDO's Centre for Airborne Systems (CABS) initiated a programme to fulfil an Indian Air Force requirement for signals intelligence gathering, communications jamming, electronic warfare and spoofing roles. In 2023, at Aero India, DRDO showcased a 1:32 scale model of the SCA system, outlining its capabilities. DRDO plans to base the SCA system on a preowned Airbus A319 or Airbus A321. In February 2024, the Indian Defence Ministry's Defence Acquisition Council (DAC) granted Acceptance of Necessity (AoN) for the acquisition of three SCA systems initially at an estimated cost of ₹63 billion (US$717.14 million).

== Operators ==
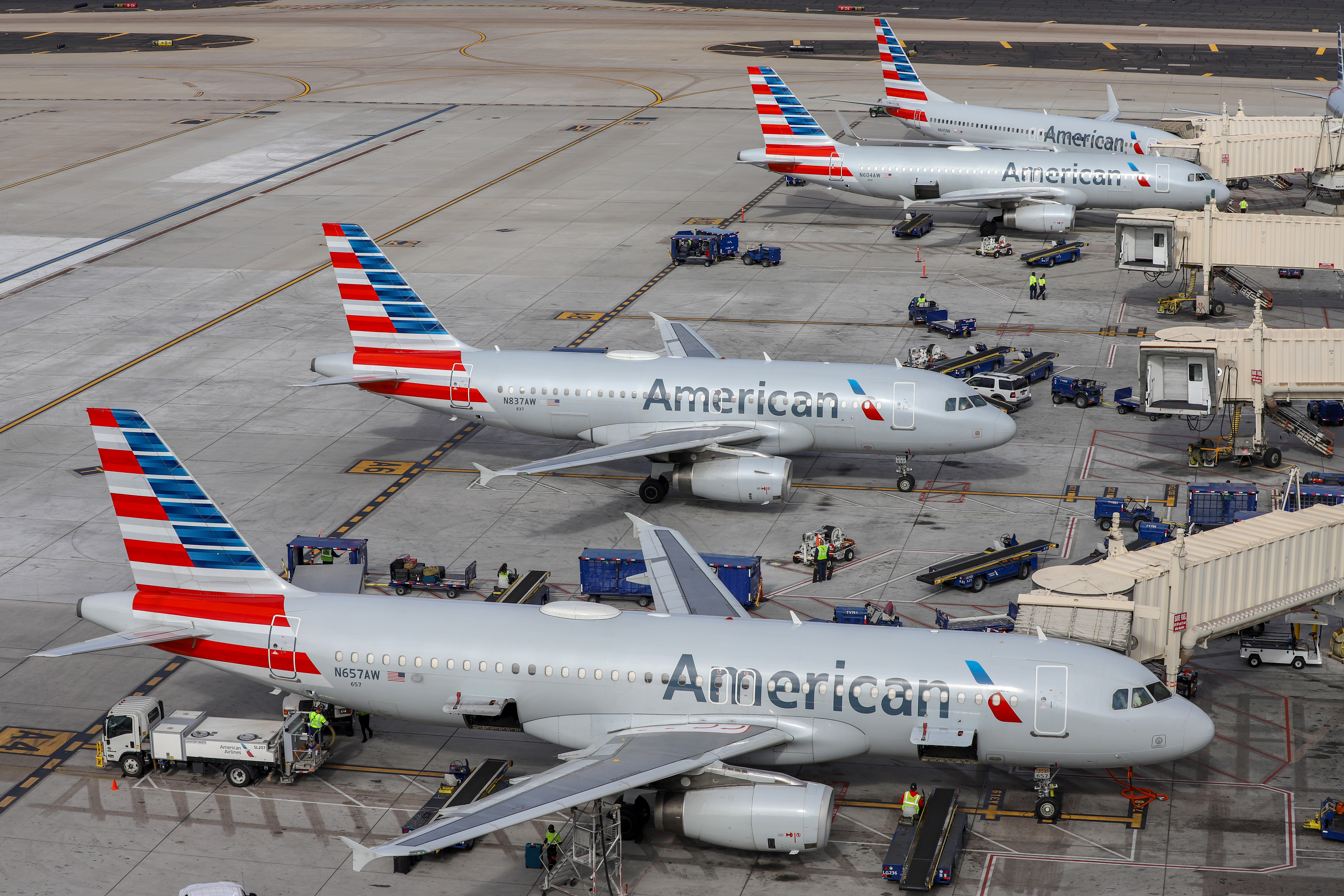
American Airlines is the largest A320 operator.

As of September 2026, there are 11,374 A320 family aircraft in commercial service with over 375 operators. The five largest operators are American Airlines (494), IndiGo (405), China Eastern Airlines (394), easyJet (370) and China Southern Airlines (359). Aircraft in operation include 26 A318s, 1,059 A319s (1,014 ceo, 45 neo), 6,373 A320s (3,903 ceo, 2,470 neo) and 3,916 A321s (1,655 ceo, 2,261 neo) aircraft. In addition, 1,502 A320ceo family aircraft (54 A318s, 470 A319ceos, 849 A320ceos and 129 A321ceos) and 24 A320neo family aircraft (22 A320neos + 2 A321neos) were out of service through retirement or write-off.

Air France, British Airways, and Frontier Airlines are the only operators to have operated all four variants of the A320ceo family. Middle East Airlines received two milestone aircraft. The first was an A320ceo with manufacturer serial number (MSN) 5,000 on 20 January 2012. Eight years later, on 9 October 2020, the airline received MSN 10,000, an A321neo, at the celebration of its 75th anniversary. In 2017, the A320 family became the most operated airliner family with a fleet of 6,965 aircraft, surpassing the Boeing 737 fleet of 6,864 aircraft. In December 2022, over 10,000 A320 family aircraft were operated by more than 330 airlines, completing more than 158 million flights, or 292 million hours in the air.

=== Orders and deliveries ===
The A320ceo family was the fastest-selling airliner from 2005 to 2007. Its successor, the A320neo family, improved on this with 1,420 orders and commitments in less than a year in 2011. In November 2013, the A320 family aircraft reached 10,000 orders. As of 2017, there were 6,965 A320 Family aircraft in service, more than the 6,864 Boeing 737s, making it the most-operated airliner ever. In October 2019, the A320 family became the highest-selling airliner family with 15,193 orders, surpassing the Boeing 737's total of 15,136. In August 2021, the A320 family passed the 10,000 delivery mark, 33 years after its introduction, versus 50 years for the Boeing 737, which passed the 10,000 delivery mark in March 2018. On 16 December 2021, the last member of the A320ceo family, an A321ceo (MSN 10315), was delivered from the Airbus Mobile assembly line in Alabama to Delta Air Lines, registered N129DN. In July 2022, total orders for the A320neo family reached 8,502, exceeding the total orders for the A320ceo family of 8,120. In June 2023, total orders for the A321neo reached 5,163, surpassing total orders for the A320ceo of 4,763, and making it the most-ordered variant of the A320 family. In July 2023, total orders for the A321neo reached 5,259, surpassing the record 5,205 orders for the Boeing 737-800, making it the most ordered variant of any airliner in history. In December 2023, the A320neo family became the first of airliner generations to reach a record order of 10,000 units and an order backlog of 7,000 units. In September 2025, the A320 family surpassed the Boeing 737 as the most-delivered jet aircraft and thus the best-selling airliner ever. In May 2026, the A320 family became the first airliner programme to reach 20,000 orders.

As of October 2026, a total of 12,955 A320 family aircraft have been delivered, with 6 A320ceos (2 A319s and 4 A320s from two defunct airlines) remaining in the backlog. In the first ten months of 2026, Airbus delivered 483 A320neo family aircraft, comprising 5 A319neo, 172 A320neos and 306 A321neos. The A320 family backlog remains over the 7,000 mark, of which A321s comprise 70%, and total orders have reached 20,598, while total orders for the competing Boeing 737 have increased slightly to 17,791 aircraft, of which 12,772 have been delivered.

Type	Orders		Deliveries											
Type	Total	Backlog	Total	2026	2025	2024	2023	2022	2021	2020	2019	2018	2017	2016
A318	80	–	80	–	–	–	–	–	–	–	–	–	–	1
A319	1,486	2	1,484	–	–	–	–	–	2	3	4	8	10	4
A320	4,756	4	4,752	–	–	–	–	–	–	3	49	133	184	251
A321	1,784	–	1,784	–	–	–	–	–	22	9	38	99	183	222
-- A320ceo --	8,106	6	8,100	–	–	–	–	–	24	15	91	240	377	477
A319neo	58	12	46	5	15	9	7	6	2	–	2	–	–	–
A320neo	4,417	1,910	2,507	172	205	232	247	246	258	253	381	284	161	68
A321neo	8,017	5,715	2,302	306	387	361	317	264	199	178	168	102	20	–
-- A320neo --	12,492	7,637	4,855	483	607	602	571	516	459	431	551	386	181	68
(A320 family)	(20,598)	(7,643)	(12,955)	(483)	(607)	(602)	(571)	(516)	(483)	(446)	(642)	(626)	(558)	(545)

Type	Deliveries															
Type	2015	2014	2013	2012	2011	2010	2009	2008	2007	2006	2005	2004	2003	2002	2001	2000
A318	–	1	2	2	2	6	13	–	17	8	9	10	9	–	–	–
A319	24	34	38	38	47	51	88	98	105	137	142	87	72	85	89	112
A320	282	306	352	332	306	297	221	209	194	164	121	101	119	116	119	101
A321	184	150	102	83	66	51	87	66	51	30	17	35	33	35	49	28
-- A320ceo --	490	491	493	455	421	401	402	386	367	339	289	233	233	236	257	241
-- A320neo --	–	–	–	–	–	–	–	–	–	–	–	–	–	–	–	–
(A320 family)	(490)	(491)	(493)	(455)	(421)	(401)	(402)	(386)	(367)	(339)	(289)	(233)	(233)	(236)	(257)	(241)

Type	Deliveries											
Type	1999	1998	1997	1996	1995	1994	1993	1992	1991	1990	1989	1988
A318	–	–	–	–	–	–	–	–	–	–	–	–
A319	88	53	47	18	–	–	–	–	–	–	–	–
A320	101	80	58	38	34	48	71	111	119	58	58	16
A321	33	35	22	16	22	16	–	–	–	–	–	–
-- A320ceo --	222	168	127	72	56	64	71	111	119	58	58	16
-- A320neo --	–	–	–	–	–	–	–	–	–	–	–	–
(A320 family)	(222)	(168)	(127)	(72)	(56)	(64)	(71)	(111)	(119)	(58)	(58)	(16)

Data as of October 2026

Airbus:; Boeing:; View source data.

== Accidents and incidents ==
As of June 2024, across the entire A320 family, 180 major aviation accidents and incidents have occurred, including 38 hull loss accidents. resulting in a total of 1490 fatalities. The deadliest incident involving the A320 family was the bombing of Metrojet Flight 9268 on 31 October 2015, with 224 fatalities. The A320 family has experienced 50 incidents in which several flight displays were lost.

As of 2015, the Airbus A320 family had experienced 0.12 fatal hull loss accidents for every million takeoffs and 0.26 total hull loss accidents for every million takeoffs.

As of 2023, the Airbus A320 family had experienced 0.095 (0.08 for A320ceo and 0.11 for A320neo) fatal hull loss accidents for every million takeoffs and 0.14 (0.17 for A320ceo and 0.11 for A320neo) total hull loss accidents for every million takeoffs.

== Aircraft on display ==
Photograph	Registration number	Model	Build date	First flight	Last flight	Operator	Location	Status	Notes	Refs.
	F-WWAI	Airbus A320-100	1987	22 February 1987	28 August 2019	Airbus	Aeroscopia, Blagnac, France	On static display, delivered in 2017	First A320 built	
	N106US	Airbus A320-214	1999	15 June 1999	15 January 2009	US Airways	Sullenberger Aviation Museum, Charlotte, North Carolina	On static display	Aircraft that flew US Airways Flight 1549	

== Specifications ==
Airbus A320 family specifications
Subtype	A318	A319	A320	A321
Cockpit crew	Two			
Exit limit EASA/FAA	136	160	180 188 (with Space Flex)	236
1-class max. seating	132 at 74–76 cm (29–30 in) pitch	156 at 71–76 cm (28–30 in) pitch	186 at 74 cm (29 in) pitch	230 at 28 in (71 cm) pitch
1-class, typical	117 at 81 cm (32 in) pitch	134 at 81 cm (32 in) pitch	164 at 81 cm (32 in) pitch	199 at 81 cm (32 in) pitch
2-class, typical	107 (8F @ 97 cm, 99Y @ 81 cm)	124 (8F @ 97 cm, 116Y @ 81 cm)	150 (12F @ 91 cm, 138Y @ 81 cm)	185 (16F @ 91 cm, 169Y @ 81 cm)
Cargo volume	21.20 m^{3} (749 cu ft)	27.70 m^{3} (978 cu ft)	37.40 m^{3} (1,321 cu ft)	51.70 m^{3} (1,826 cu ft)
Unit load devices		4× LD3-45	7× LD3-45	10× LD3-45
Length	31.44 m (103 ft 2 in)	33.84 m (111 ft 0 in)	37.57 m (123 ft 3 in)	44.51 m (146 ft 0 in)
Wingspan	34.10 m (111 ft 11 in)	35.8 m (117 ft 5 in) (Note: with sharklets)		
Wing area	122.4 m^{2} (1,318 sq ft), 9.5 AR	124 m^{2} (1,330 sq ft), 10.3 AR		128 m^{2} (1,380 sq ft), 10 AR
Wingsweep	25 degrees			
Height	12.56 m (41 ft 2 in)	11.76 m (38 ft 7 in)		
Fuselage	4.14 m (13 ft 7 in) height, 3.95 m (13 ft 0 in) width, 3.70 m (12 ft 2 in) cabin width			
MTOW	68 t (150,000 lb)	75.5 t (166,000 lb)	78 t (172,000 lb)	93.5 t (206,000 lb)
Max. payload	15 t (33,000 lb)	17.7 t (39,000 lb)	19.9 t (44,000 lb)	25.3 t (56,000 lb)
Fuel capacity	24,210 L (6,400 US gal; 5,330 imp gal)	30,190 L (7,980 US gal; 6,640 imp gal)	27,200 L (7,200 US gal; 6,000 imp gal)	30,030 L (7,930 US gal; 6,610 imp gal)
OEW	39.5 t (87,100 lb)	40.8 t (89,900 lb)	42.6 t (93,900 lb)	48.5 t (107,000 lb)
Minimum weight	34.5 t (76,000 lb)	35.4 t (78,000 lb)	37.23 t (82,100 lb)	47.5 t (105,000 lb)
Speed	Cruise: Mach 0.78 (448 kn; 829 km/h; 515 mph); MMO: Mach 0.82 (471 kn; 872 km/h; 542 mph)			
Range (Note: typical passengers and bags)	5,700 km (3,600 mi; 3,100 nmi)	6,940 km (4,320 mi; 3,750 nmi)	6,200 km (3,860 mi; 3,350 nmi)	5,900 km (3,700 mi; 3,200 nmi)
Takeoff (MTOW, SL, ISA)	1,780 m (5,840 ft)	1,850 m (6,070 ft)	2,100 m (6,900 ft)	
Landing (MLW, SL, ISA)	1,230 m (4,040 ft)	1,360 m (4,460 ft)	1,500 m (4,900 ft)	
Ceiling	39,100–41,000 ft (11,900–12,500 m)			
Engines (×2)	CFM International CFM56-5B, 68.3 in (1.73 m) fan			
Engines (×2)	PW6000A, 56.5 in (1.44 m) fan	IAE V2500-A5, 63.5 in (1.61 m) fan		
Thrust (×2)	96–106 kN (22,000–24,000 lb_{f})	98–120 kN (22,000–27,000 lb_{f})		133–147 kN (30,000–33,000 lb_{f})
ICAO code	A318	A319	A320	A321

=== Aircraft type designations ===
Aircraft model	Certification date	Engines
A318-111	23 May 2003	CFM56-5B8/P
A318-112	23 May 2003	CFM56-5B9/P
A318-121	21 December 2005	PW6122A
A318-122	21 December 2005	PW6124A
A319-111	10 April 1996	CFM56-5B5 or 5B5/P
A319-112	10 April 1996	CFM56-5B6 or 5B6/P or 5B6/2P
A319-113	31 May 1996	CFM56-5A4 or 5A4/F
A319-114	31 May 1996	CFM56-5A5 or 5A5/F
A319-115	30 July 1999	CFM56-5B7 or 5B7/P
A319-131	18 December 1996	IAE Model V2522-A5
A319-132	18 December 1996	IAE Model V2524-A5
A319-133	30 July 1999	IAE Model V2527M-A5
A320-111	26 February 1988	CFM56-5A1 or 5A1/F
A320-211	8 November 1988	CFM56-5A1 or 5A1/F
A320-212	20 November 1990	CFM56-5A3
A320-214	10 March 1995	CFM56-5B4 or 5B4/P or 5B4/2P
A320-215	22 June 2006	CFM56-5B5
A320-216	14 June 2006	CFM56-5B6
A320-231	20 April 1989	IAE Model V2500-A1
A320-232	28 September 1993	IAE Model V2527-A5
A320-233	12 June 1996	IAE Model V2527E-A5
A321-111	27 May 1995	CFM56-5B1 or 5B1/P or 5B1/2P
A321-112	15 February 1995	CFM56-5B2 or 5B2/P
A321-131	17 December 1993	IAE Model V2530-A5
A321-211	20 March 1997	CFM56-5B3 or 5B3/P or 5B3/2P
A321-212	31 August 2001	CFM56-5B1 or 5B1/P or 5B1/2P
A321-213	31 August 2001	CFM56-5B2 or 5B2/P
A321-231	20 March 1997	IAE Model V2533-A5
A321-232	31 August 2001	IAE Model V2530-A5

== See also ==
- Competition between Airbus and Boeing

Related development

- Airbus A320neo family

Aircraft of comparable role, configuration, and era

- Airbus A220
- Boeing 717
- Boeing 737 Classic
- Boeing 737 Next Generation
- Boeing 757
- Comac C919
- Embraer 195
- Irkut MC-21
- McDonnell Douglas MD-80
- McDonnell Douglas MD-90
- Tupolev Tu-204

Related lists

- List of aircraft
- List of jet airliners
