= Gerhard Neumann Museum =

Coordinates: 48.7665°N 13.0258°E

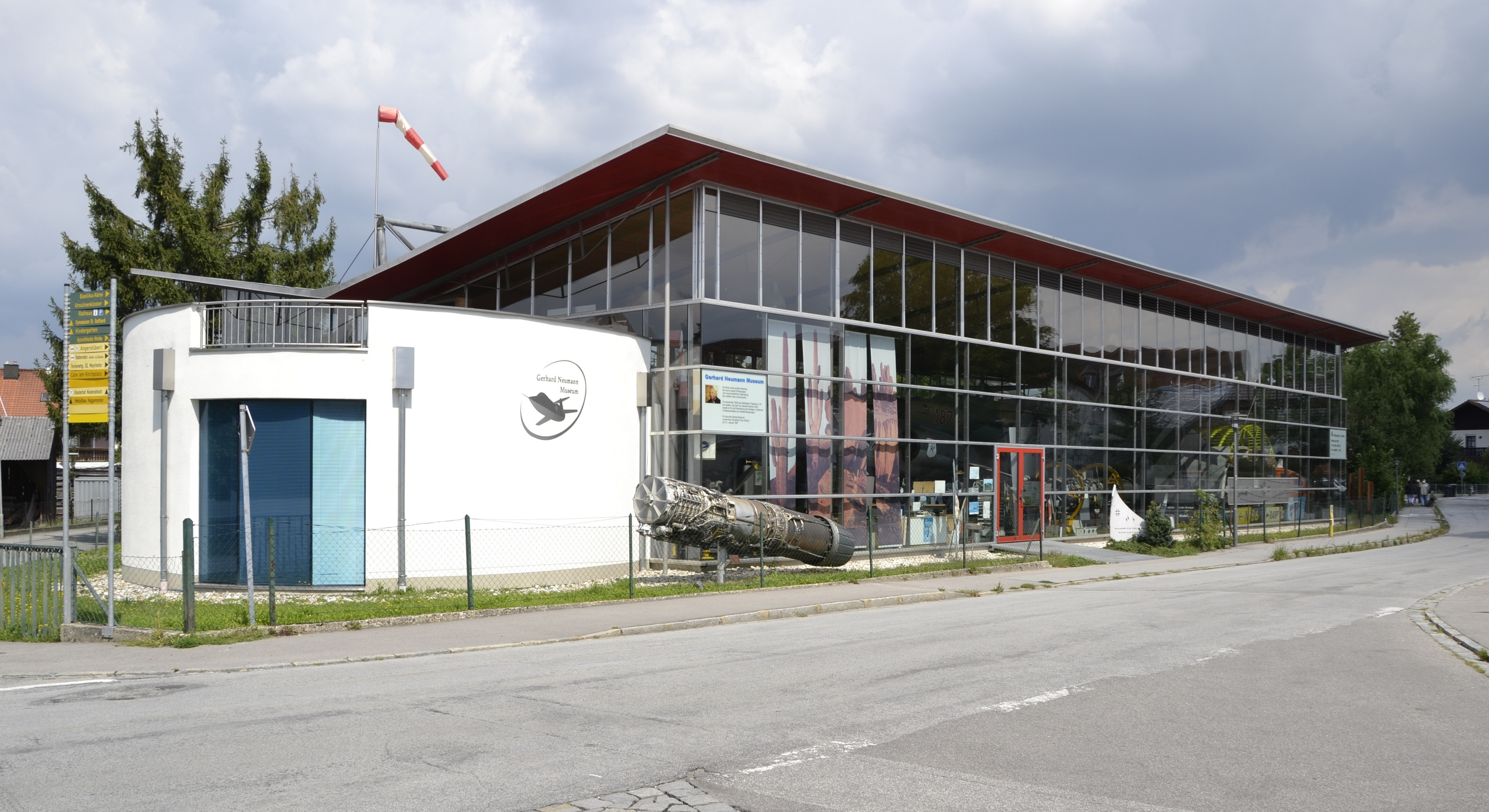
- Established: 2000
- Location: Niederalteich, Bavaria
- Type: Aviation museum
- Website: http://www.f-104.de/english/home_english.html

The Gerhard Neumann Museum is an aviation museum located in the German village of Niederalteich in Bavaria. The museum chronicles the work of German aero engine designer Gerhard Neumann, in particular the General Electric J79 turbojet and Lockheed F-104 Starfighter which this engine powered. Many aerospace exhibits are on display including fixed-wing aircraft and aircraft engines.

== Aircraft on display ==
The museum has four examples of the Lockheed F-104, a Mikoyan-Gurevich MiG-21 and fuselage sections of other aircraft types.

=== Jet aircraft ===
- Airbus A300 (fuselage section)
- Eurofighter Typhoon (fuselage section)
- Lockheed F-104G Starfighter, four airframes.
- Hamburger Flugzeugbau HFB-320 Hansa Jet
- MBB Lampyridae
- Mikoyan-Gurevich MiG-21
- Panavia Tornado (fuselage section)

== Aircraft engines ==
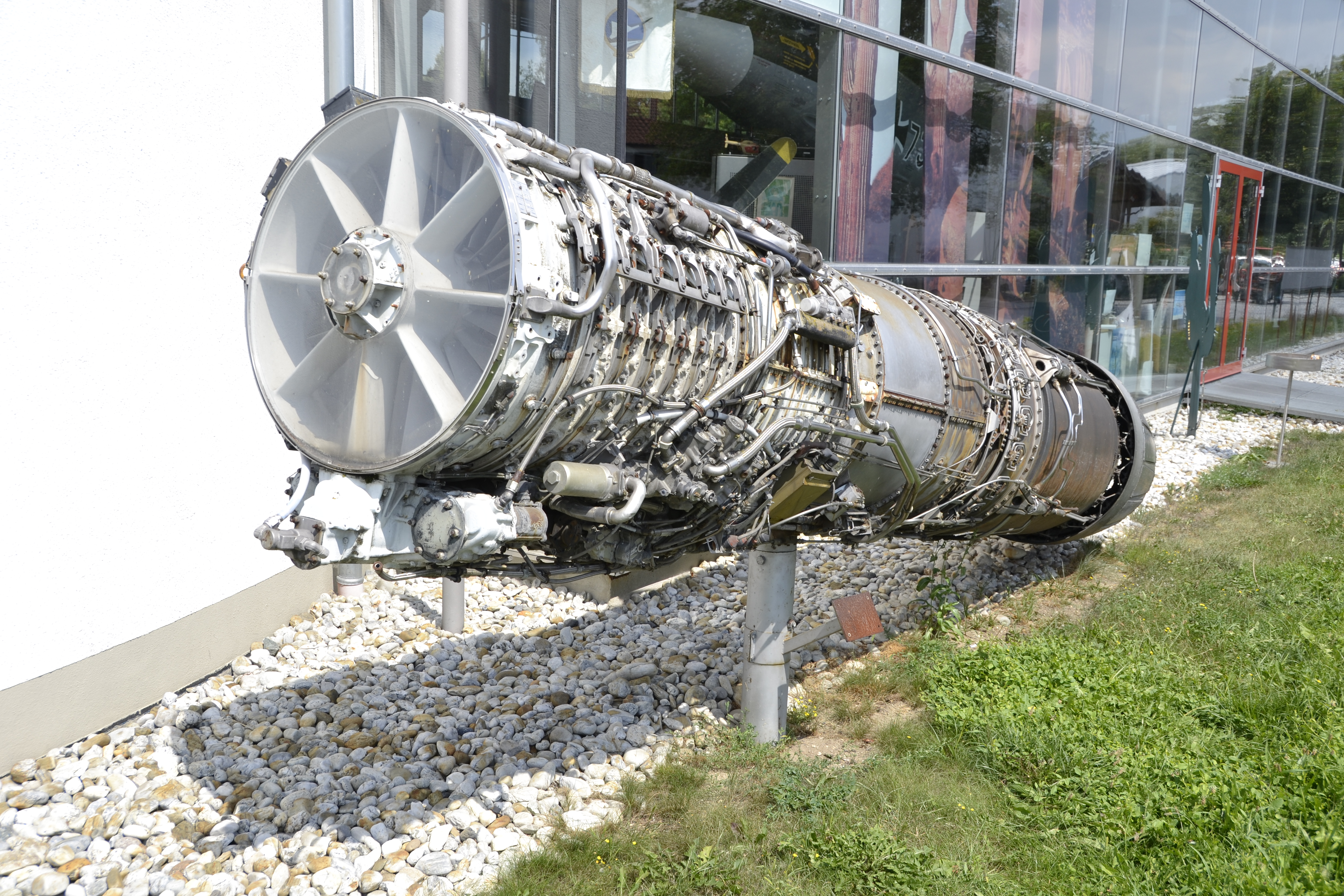
The General Electric J79 in front of the museum

=== Gas turbine engines ===
- General Electric J79

== See also ==
- List of aerospace museums
