= Gerhard Neumann =

German-American engineer (1917–1997)

- Born: October 8, 1917; Frankfurt (Oder), Germany
- Died: November 2, 1997 (aged 80)
- Occupations: executive, engineer
- Spouse: Clarice Neumann
- Awards: Daniel Guggenheim Medal (1979)

Gerhard Neumann (October 8, 1917 – November 2, 1997) was a German-American aviation engineer and executive for General Electric's aircraft engine division (which today is called GE Aerospace). Born and raised in Germany, he went to China shortly before World War II where he became an aircraft mechanic for the United States Army Air Forces. He was naturalised as an American citizen by an Act of Congress, and went on to a career in the aerospace manufacturing industry.

== Childhood and education ==
Neumann was born in Frankfurt (Oder) in the Prussian Province of Brandenburg. His parents Siegfried and Frieda were non-practicing Jewish Germans. As a teenager, Neumann apprenticed under a master auto mechanic, surnamed Schroth, who followed the traditional Prussian lifestyle of "First the work, then the pleasure." In 1935, Neumann entered the well-regarded technical college Ingenieurschule Mittweida and earned very high grades. With other students from the college, he learned to construct and pilot a one-person glider. His experience as an engine mechanic, aircraft designer, and practical engineer proved very useful in his career.

== Off to China ==
The winds of war were growing in Nazi Germany, and alliances were murky and shifting. In late 1938, Neumann saw a bulletin board posting at Mittweida saying that Chinese Generalissimo Chiang Kai-shek needed engineers in his fight against Japanese invaders. Engineers who got the jobs would receive deferment from conscription into the German army. Neumann decided to leave his family and embark on a long journey to the British colony of Hong Kong in May 1939. But upon arriving in Hong Kong, he found that the company for which he was to work had disappeared. Fortunately, his skills as an auto mechanic were in great demand.

A few months later, on 1 September 1939, Germany invaded Poland. On 3 September, the United Kingdom declared war on Germany, and all Germans in Hong Kong were rounded up and interned in La Salle College, Kowloon, a Christian Brothers High School for boys. Neumann was interned in the school together with some 100 Germans for several months. The British in Hong Kong considered any German citizen a potential fifth column and revoked his passport. No embassy would talk to him.

Neumann had a chance meeting with W. Langhorne Bond of the China National Aviation Corporation (CNAC). The company arranged for Neumann to enter China without a passport. He flew to Kunming, capital of the remote Yunnan province, and there he contacted the Chinese Air Force. He worked as an auto mechanic until the Pearl Harbor attack, when he accepted an offer from Colonel Claire Lee Chennault, who had established the Chinese Air Force with Madame Chiang Kai-shek, to work in support of that Air Force.

As the war with Japan progressed, the Chinese Air Force became the American Volunteer Group (AVG), nicknamed the "Flying Tigers." Neumann was part of the Headquarters Squadron as a Propeller Specialist. While with the Flying Tigers, Neumann was nicknamed "Herman the German". When the AVG was replaced by the U.S. Army Air Forces, Neumann was inducted into the USAAF in July 1942 although he was not yet a U.S. citizen. He helped the effort against the Japanese in many important ways. He led dangerous supply convoys, performed all types of mechanical repairs on P-40 aircraft, translated to and from Chinese, assembled a working enemy Zero fighter from crash parts to assess its flight characteristics (the other such Zero was the Akutan Zero), and even directed bombing attacks from the ground while disguised as a Chinese coolie.

Eventually Neumann was dispatched to Washington, D.C. to brief William Donovan, head of the OSS, where he met his future wife Clarice. Yet for all of Neumann's heroism in China, as a German he was still considered an enemy alien. It took an act of the United States Congress to correct this. After the war, he was finally permitted to work for Douglas Aircraft Research.

== Return to China ==
In late 1946, Chennault offered Neumann an engineering position with Chinese National Relief and Rehabilitation Airline, a new airline Chennault was forming using war-surplus C-46 transports. Neumann accepted, and on their way to China he and Clarice were married.

In the year that followed, the Chinese Civil War was raging and the Communist People's Liberation Army was taking over China. The Neumanns had no choice but to attempt to return to the United States. They chose an unusual route. Instead of flying or sailing across the Pacific, Clarice suggested that they drive over the Asian continent towards North Africa. Thus began their incredible and quite dangerous journey to the Mediterranean Sea, via Siam (now Thailand), Burma, India, Afghanistan, Iraq, and Palestine. Most border crossings were dangerous, because by 1948 most countries in Asia were undergoing political turmoil. Finally, after a journey of many thousands of miles on poor roads by Jeep, Neumann, Clarice and their dog Mr. Chips arrived in Tel Aviv during the first Arab-Israeli war and were able to travel conventionally to New York City.

== Jet engine innovator ==
In March 1948, Neumann began work as a test engineer for the General Electric Aircraft Gas Turbine Division, located in Lynn, Massachusetts. There he drove many innovations in jet engine design, which included promoting the variable stator compressor for the J79 jet engine which enabled aircraft such as the F-104 to reach speeds of Mach 2; The development team (Neumann, Neil Burgess, and Clarence L. Johnson of Lockheed) were awarded the Collier Trophy for 1958. As a Vice President at General Electric, he piloted various jet fighters during the 1960s to personally understand how engines behaved in flight and what pilots required from them.

A major success for GE was his guiding the design and development of the huge high-bypass turbofan jet engines (or simply called "fanjets") that now power the largest commercial and military cargo aircraft. These include the TF39, CF6, and (in 50/50 collaboration with SNECMA) the CFM56.

== Retirement ==
Neumann retired from GE on January 1, 1980, after 32 years of service. He remained active in retirement, until he developed leukemia and died on November 2, 1997.

In 1987, Neumann was inducted into the National Aviation Hall of Fame in Dayton, Ohio.

The Gerhard Neumann Museum in Niederalteich, Bavaria, honors his contributions to aviation.

The Massachusetts Institute of Technology Aeronautics and Astronautic Department's Neumann Hangar facility in Cambridge, Massachusetts, is named in his honor.

His autobiography "Herman the German: Just Lucky I Guess" chronicles his life.

GE Aerospace, located in Evendale, Ohio, is on 1 Neumann Way. This facility at one point housed over 4.5 million square feet under one roof.

== Bibliography ==
- Neumann, Gerhard (1984), Herman the German: Enemy Alien U.S. Army Master Sergeant, New York, NY, USA: Morrow, ISBN 0-688-01682-0.
- Neumann, Gerhard (1989), China, Jeep und Jetmotoren: Vom Autolehrling zum Topmanager, Planegg, Germany: Aviatic Verlag, ISBN 3-925505-04-0.
- Neumann, Gerhard (2004) [1984], Herman the German: Just Lucky I Guess, Bloomington, IN, USA: Authorhouse, ISBN 1-4184-7925-X. A republishing of the 1984 memoir titled Herman the German: Enemy Alien U.S. Army Master Sergeant [Morrow, New York, NY, USA], with a new title but with minor or no textual changes.
