= Chrysostom Blashkevich =

Chrysostom Blashkevich, OSB (January 27, 1915, Bely, Tver Oblast, Russian Empire – October 3, 1981, Niederalteich, Germany) was a Benedictine monk of Russian origin. Blashkevich was born in a Russian Orthodox family. During World War II was recruited into the Soviet Army, where he turned his coat and served as interpreter in the German Army. In 1945, he converted to Catholicism and entered the Benedictine Order, being dean of the monks of the Russian Greek Catholic Church at Niederalteich Abbey in West Germany.

Father Blashkevich was engaged in Catholic ecumenism with other Christian religions but he was also a critic of desacralisation of Catholic doctrine in relation to the dialogue with Protestant denominations and the real intentions of the Orthodox Christian clergy in ecumenism.

== Biography ==
A graduate of the Moscow Institute of Foreign Languages (1936-1941), was a rural teacher in the Smolensk Oblast. As a student Blashkevich belonged to the so-called Alexei Mechev of Moscow's circle who had in the Transfiguration Church in Dimitrov his secret center. The Orthodox Bishop of Dmitrov Seraphim (Zvezdinsky) brought him to the community of spiritual instruction. During the Second World War he surrendered and served as an interpreter and military translator for the Wehrmacht. In 1944 in Poland adopted Catholicism. In 1946 he entered the Benedictine monastery at Niederalteich Abbey, where in 1947 was tonsured. From 1947 to 1951 made philosophical and theological studies at the University of Passau, and from 1951 to 1954 in Russicum in Rome. In 1952 Blashkevich was ordained a deacon in the same year to the rank of priest of Russian Greek Catholic Church. He worked to evangelize the Russian diaspora, while maintaining the liturgy and traditions of the Russian Church.

== Scientific work ==
In 1954 Blashkevich defended his doctoral thesis on " Pomeranian answers as reflecting the teachings of Russian Old Believers first quarter of the 18th century." He worked as an assistant professor of Russian church history at the University of Salzburg. Their researches were published under the pseudonym "Andrew White Sea," or as "Hieromonk Chrysostomos," without giving names. In the USSR, the magazine Science and Religion put two of his pamphlets" Rule Does deniers religion, "and" deniers are right if the Church? "angry article. Collaborated with Russian publishers in Diaspora " Life with God "in Brussels and Russian Center. Vladimir Solovyov at Fortdamskom University in New York. The library Betty Ambiveri at the center of " Christian Russia "in Seriate, Italy Blashkevicha for books with his autograph .

== Works ==
Die «Pomorskie otvety» als Denkmal der Anschauungen der russischen Altglaubigen gegen Ende des 1. Viertels des 18. Jahrhunderts / / Orientalia Christiana Analecta. Roma, 1957. Vol. 148.

Die Religiosen Krafte der Russischen Geschichte. - Munchen, 1961. * Belomorsky A. What it means to be Orthodox? [B / m]. 1954. 55.

Kirchengeschichte Russlands der neuesten Zeit: 3 Bd. - Munchen; Salzburg, 1965–1968.

Belomorsky A. Orthodoxy and the Papacy. New York: Fortdamsky University, 1955. 36.

A. Right there Belomorsky deniers religion? New York: Fortdamsky University, 1959 (2nd ed. Brussels: Life with God, 1965). 91.

Chrysostom, Fr. Ecumenical council. New York: Fortdamsky University, 1959.

Chrysostom, Fr. Ecumenical Council and the Papacy. New York: Fortdamsky University, 1960.

Chrysostom, Fr. Is it possible to restore the unity between the Catholic and Orthodox Church. New York: Fortdamsky University, 1961.

Chrysostom, Fr. The primacy of St. Peter the Apostle and vsehvalnogo: How to understand his holy father John Chrysostom. Brussels: A Life with God, 1962. 24 s.

Chrysostom, Fr. Ecumenical Council: The word of the Pope John XXIII at the opening of II-Second Vatican Council. Brussels: A Life with God, 1963. 40.

== Notes ==
Totsk Irenaeus, Archimandrite. Together govern the ship of Christ / / New Europe. 1993, No. 3. with. 18 - 19
