= CFM International CFM56 =

Franco–American turbofan aircraft engine

CFM56
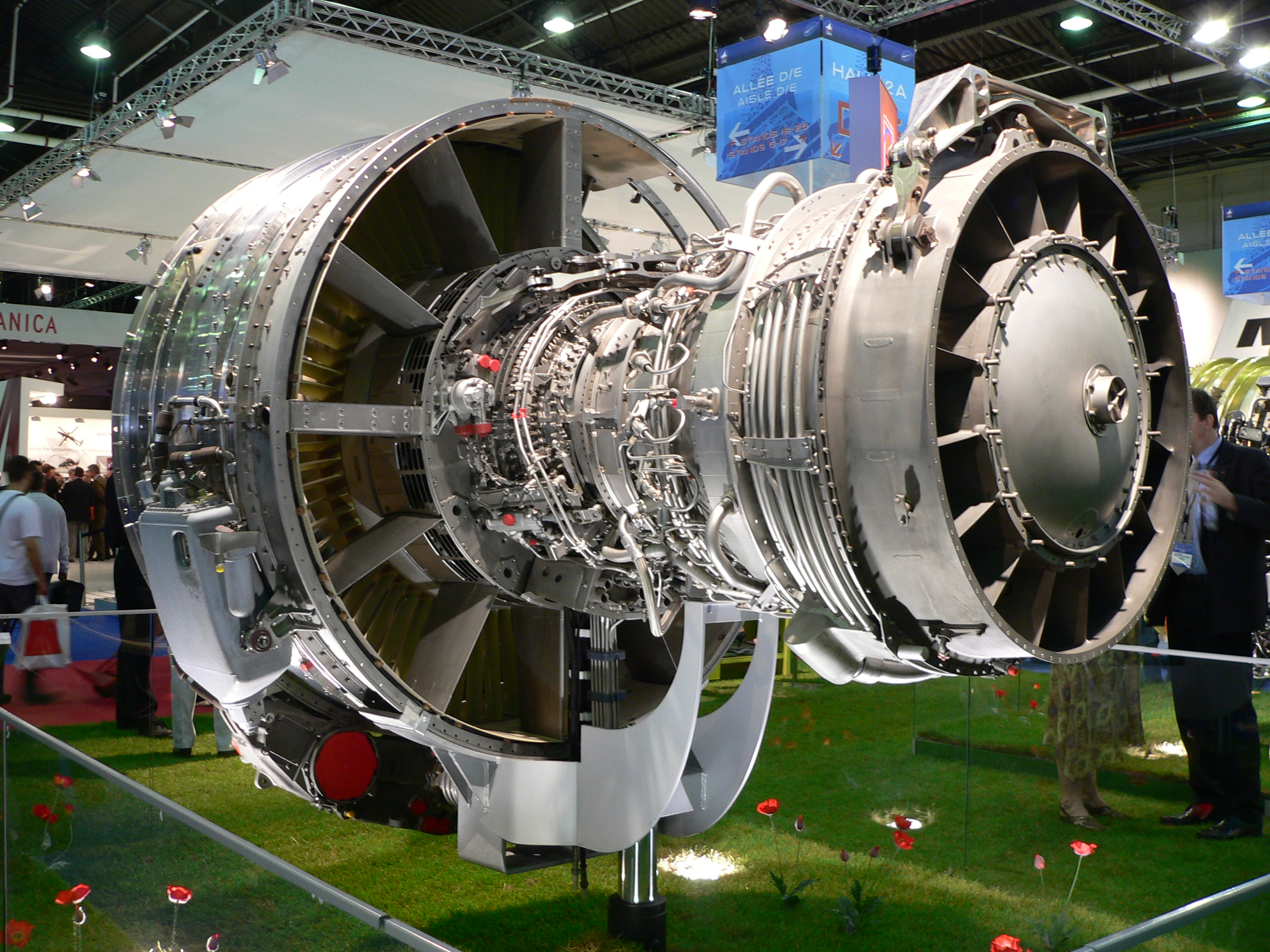
- Rear view of a CFM56-5
- Type: Turbofan
- National origin: France / United States
- Manufacturer: CFM International
- First run: 20 June 1974
- Major applications: Airbus A320 family; Airbus A340; Boeing 737 Classic; Boeing 737 Next Generation; Boeing KC-135R Stratotanker; Douglas DC-8-70
- Number built: 32,645 (June 2018)
- Developed from: General Electric F101
- Developed into: CFM International LEAP; General Electric Affinity

The CFM International CFM56 (U.S. military designation F108) series is a Franco-American family of high-bypass turbofan aircraft engines made by CFM International (CFMI), with a thrust range of 18,500 to 34,000 lbf (82 to 150 kN). CFMI is a 50–50 joint-owned company of Safran Aircraft Engines (formerly known as Snecma) of France, and GE Aerospace (GE) of the United States. GE produces the high-pressure compressor, combustor, and high-pressure turbine, Safran manufactures the fan, gearbox, exhaust and the low-pressure turbine, and some components are made by Avio of Italy and Honeywell from the US. Both companies have their own final assembly line, GE in Evendale, Ohio, and Safran in Villaroche, France. The engine initially had extremely slow sales but has gone on to become the most used turbofan aircraft engine in the world.

The CFM56 first ran in 1974. By April 1979, the joint venture had not received a single order in five years and was two weeks away from being dissolved. The program was saved when Delta Air Lines, United Airlines, and Flying Tigers chose the CFM56 to re-engine their Douglas DC-8 aircraft as part of the Super 70 program. The first engines entered service in 1982. The CFM56 was later selected to re-engine the Boeing 737. Boeing initially expected this engine program (later named the Boeing 737 Classic) to sell only modestly, but in fact the CFM56's lower noise and lower fuel consumption (compared to older engines for the 737) led to strong sales.

In 1987, the IAE V2500 engine for the A320, which had beaten the CFM56 in early sales of the A320, ran into technical trouble, leading many customers to switch to the CFM56. However, the CFM56 was not without its own issues; several fan blade failure incidents were experienced during early service, including one failure that was a cause of the Kegworth air disaster, and some CFM56 variants experienced problems when flying through rain or hail. Both of these issues were resolved with engine modifications.

== History ==
=== Origins ===
Research into the next generation of commercial jet engines, high-bypass ratio turbofans in the "10-ton" (20,000 lbf; 89 kN) thrust class, began in the late 1960s. Snecma (now Safran), who had mostly built military engines previously, was the first company to seek entrance into the market by searching for a partner with commercial experience to design and build an engine in this class. They considered Pratt & Whitney, Rolls-Royce, and GE Aviation as potential partners, and after two company executives, Gerhard Neumann from GE and René Ravaud from Snecma, introduced themselves at the 1971 Paris Air Show a decision was made. The two companies saw mutual benefit in the collaboration and met several more times, fleshing out the basics of the joint project.

At the time, Pratt & Whitney dominated the commercial market. GE needed an engine in this market class, and Snecma had previous experience of working with them, collaborating on the production of the CF6-50 turbofan for the Airbus A300. Pratt & Whitney was considering upgrading their JT8D to compete in the same class as the CFM56 as a sole venture, while Rolls-Royce dealt with financial issues that precluded them from starting new projects; this situation caused GE to gain the title of best partner for the program.

A major reason for GE's interest in the collaboration, rather than building a 10-ton engine on their own, was that the Snecma project was the only source of development funds for an engine in this class at this particular time. GE was initially considering only contributing technology from its CF6 engine rather than its much more advanced F101 engine, developed for the B-1 Lancer supersonic bomber. The company was faced with a dilemma when the United States Air Force (USAF) announced its Advanced Medium STOL Transport (AMST) project in 1972 which included funding for the development of a 10-ton engine – either to build a "limited" technology 10-ton engine with Snecma, or a similar engine with "advanced" technology on their own. Concerned that the company would be left with only the "limited" engine in its portfolio if it did not win the Air Force contract (for which it was competing with Pratt & Whitney and a General Motors division with its "advanced" engine), GE decided to apply for an export license for the F101 core technology.

=== Export issues ===
GE applied for the export license in 1972 as their primary contribution to the 10-ton engine project. The United States Department of State's Office of Munitions Control recommended the rejection of the application on national security grounds; specifically because the core technology was an aspect of a strategic national defense system (B-1 bomber), it was built with Department of Defense funding, and that exporting the technology to France would limit the number of American workers on the project. The official decision was made in a National Security Decision Memorandum signed by the National Security Advisor Henry Kissinger on 19 September 1972.

While national security concerns were cited as the grounds for rejection, politics played an important role as well. The project, and the export issue associated with it, was considered so important that French President Georges Pompidou appealed directly to U.S. President Richard Nixon in 1971 to approve the deal, and Henry Kissinger brought the issue up with President Pompidou in a 1972 meeting. GE reportedly argued at the highest levels that having half of the market was better than having none of it, which they believed would happen if Snecma pursued the engine on their own without GE's contribution. Nixon administration officials feared that this project could be the beginning of the end of American aerospace leadership.

There was also speculation that the rejection may have been, in part, retaliation for French involvement in convincing the Swiss not to purchase American-made LTV A-7 Corsair II aircraft that had been competing against a French design, the Dassault Milan. In the end, the Swiss did not purchase either aircraft, opting for the Northrop F-5E Tiger II instead.

==== 1973 Nixon–Pompidou meeting ====
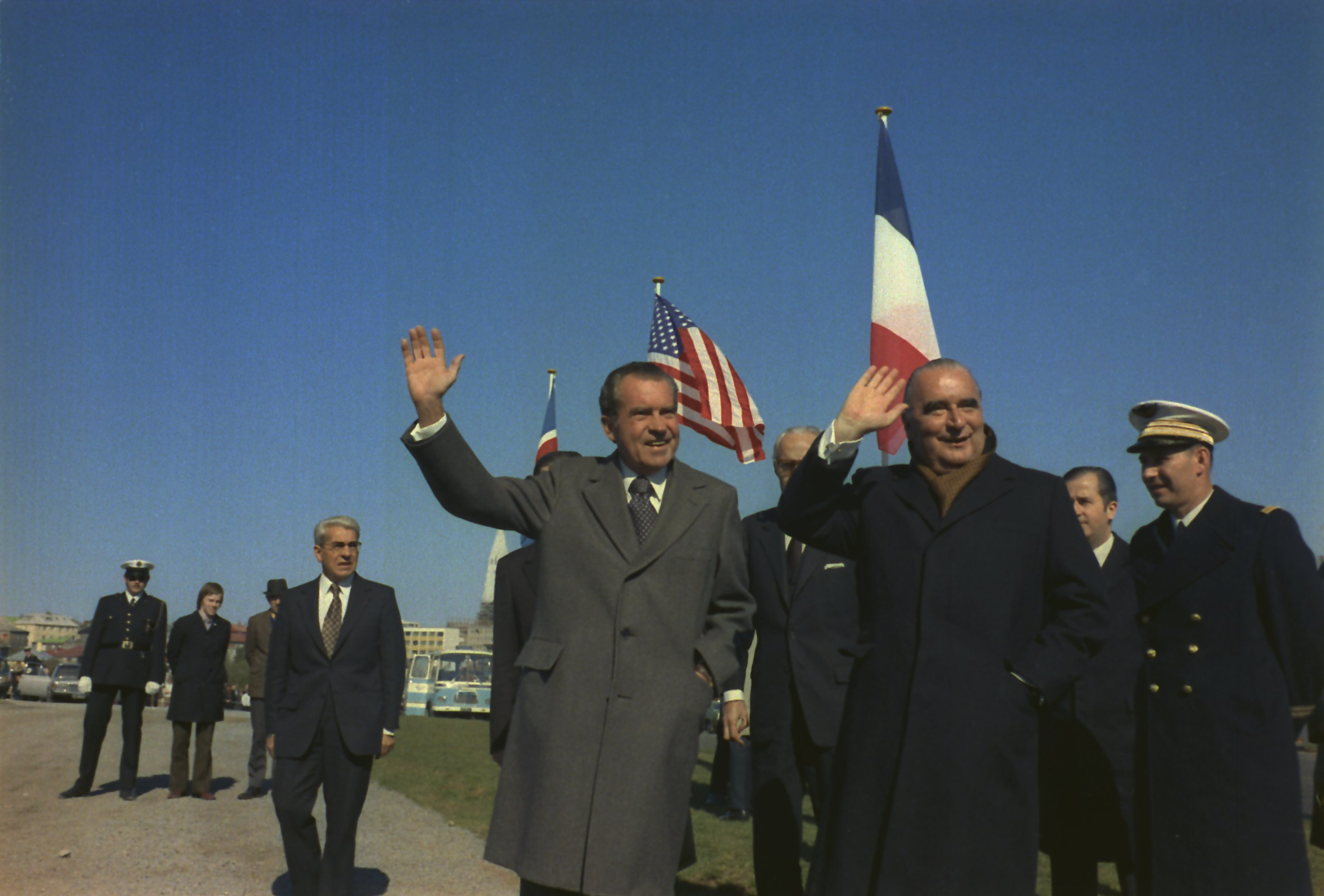
U.S. President Nixon (left) and French President Georges Pompidou (right) prior to the 1973 U.S.–French summit in Reykjavík, Iceland

Despite the export license being rejected, both the French and GE continued to push the Nixon Administration for permission to export the F101 technology. Efforts continued throughout the months following the rejection, culminating in the engine becoming an agenda topic during the 1973 meeting of Presidents Nixon and Pompidou in Reykjavík. Discussions at this meeting resulted in an agreement that allowed the development of the CFM56 to proceed. Contemporary reports state that the agreement was based on assurances that the core of the engine, the part that GE was developing from the military F101, would be built in the U.S. and then transported to France in order to protect the sensitive technologies. The joint venture also agreed to pay the U.S. an $80 million royalty fee (calculated at $20,000 per engine predicted to be built) as repayment for the development money provided by the government for the F101 engine core. Documents declassified in 2007 revealed that a key aspect of the CFM56 export agreement was that the French government agreed not to seek tariffs against American aircraft being imported into Europe.

=== CFM International ===
With the export issue settled, GE and Snecma finalized the agreement that formed CFM International (CFMI), a 50–50 joint company that would be responsible for producing and marketing the 10-ton engine, the CFM56. The venture was officially founded in 1974. The "CF" in the engine name stands for GE's designation for commercial turbofan engines, while the "M56" is the name of Snecma's original engine proposal. The two primary roles for CFMI were to manage the program between GE and Snecma, and to market, sell and service the engine at a single point of contact for the customer. CFMI was made responsible for the day-to-day decision making for the project, while major decisions (developing a new variant, for example) required the go-ahead from GE and Snecma management.

The CFMI board of directors is currently split evenly between Snecma and GE (five members each). There are two vice presidents, one from each company, who support the President of CFMI. The president tends to be drawn from Snecma and sits at CFMI's headquarters near GE in Cincinnati, Ohio.

The work split between the two companies gave GE responsibility for the high-pressure compressor (HPC), the combustor, and the high-pressure turbine (HPT); Snecma was responsible for the fan, the low-pressure compressor (LPC), and the low-pressure turbine (LPT). Snecma was also responsible for the initial airframe integration engineering, mostly involving the nacelle design, and was initially responsible for the gearbox, but shifted that work to GE when it became apparent that it would be more efficient for GE to assemble that component along with their other parts.

== Development ==
=== Overview ===
Development work on the CFM56 began before CFMI was formally created. While work proceeded smoothly, the international arrangement led to unique working conditions. For example, both companies had assembly lines, some engines were assembled and tested in the U.S. and others in France. Engines assembled in France were subject to the initially strict export agreement, which meant that GE's core was built in the U.S., then shipped to the Snecma plant in France where it was placed in a locked room into which even the President of Snecma was not allowed. The Snecma components (the fore and aft sections of the engine) were brought into the room, GE employees mounted them to the core, and then the assembled engine was taken out to be finished.

The first completed CFM56 engine first ran at GE plant in Evendale on 20 June 1974 with the second running in October 1974. The second engine was then shipped to France and first ran there on 13 December 1974. These first engines were considered "production hardware" as opposed to test examples and were designated as the CFM56-2, the first variant of the CFM56.

The engine flew for the first time in February 1977 when it replaced one of the four Pratt & Whitney JT8D engines on the McDonnell Douglas YC-15, an entrant in the Air Force's Advanced Medium STOL Transport (AMST) competition. Soon after, the second CFM56 was mounted on a Sud Aviation Caravelle at the Snecma flight test center in France. This engine had a slightly different configuration with a long bypass duct and mixed exhaust flow, (Note: Mixed Exhaust Flow refers to turbofan engines (both low and high bypass) that exhaust both the hot core flow and the cool bypass flow through a single exit nozzle. The core and bypass flows are "mixed".) rather than a short bypass duct with unmixed exhaust flow. (Note: Unmixed Exhaust Flow refers to turbofan engines (usually, but not exclusively high-bypass) that exhaust cool bypass air separately from their hot core flow. This arrangement is visually distinctive as the outer, wider, bypass section usually ends mid-way along the nacelle and the core protrudes to the rear. With two separate exhaust points, the flow is "unmixed".) It was the first to include a "Thrust Management System".

=== First customers ===
After testing the engine for several years, both in the air and on the ground, CFMI searched for customers outside of a possible AMST contract. The main targets were re-engine contracts for the Douglas DC-8 and the Boeing 707 airliners, including the related military tanker, the KC-135 Stratotanker. There was little initial interest in the engine, but Boeing realized that the CFM56 might be a solution to upcoming noise regulations. After announcing that a 707 would be configured with the CFM56 engine for flight tests in 1977, Boeing officially offered the 707-320 with the CFM56 engine as an option in 1978. The new variant was listed as the 707-700. Due to limited interest from the airlines in a re-engined 707, Boeing ended the 707-700 program in 1980 without selling any aircraft. Despite the lack of sales, having the commercial 707 available with the CFM56 helped the engine's competitiveness for the KC-135 re-engine contract.

==== KC-135R ====
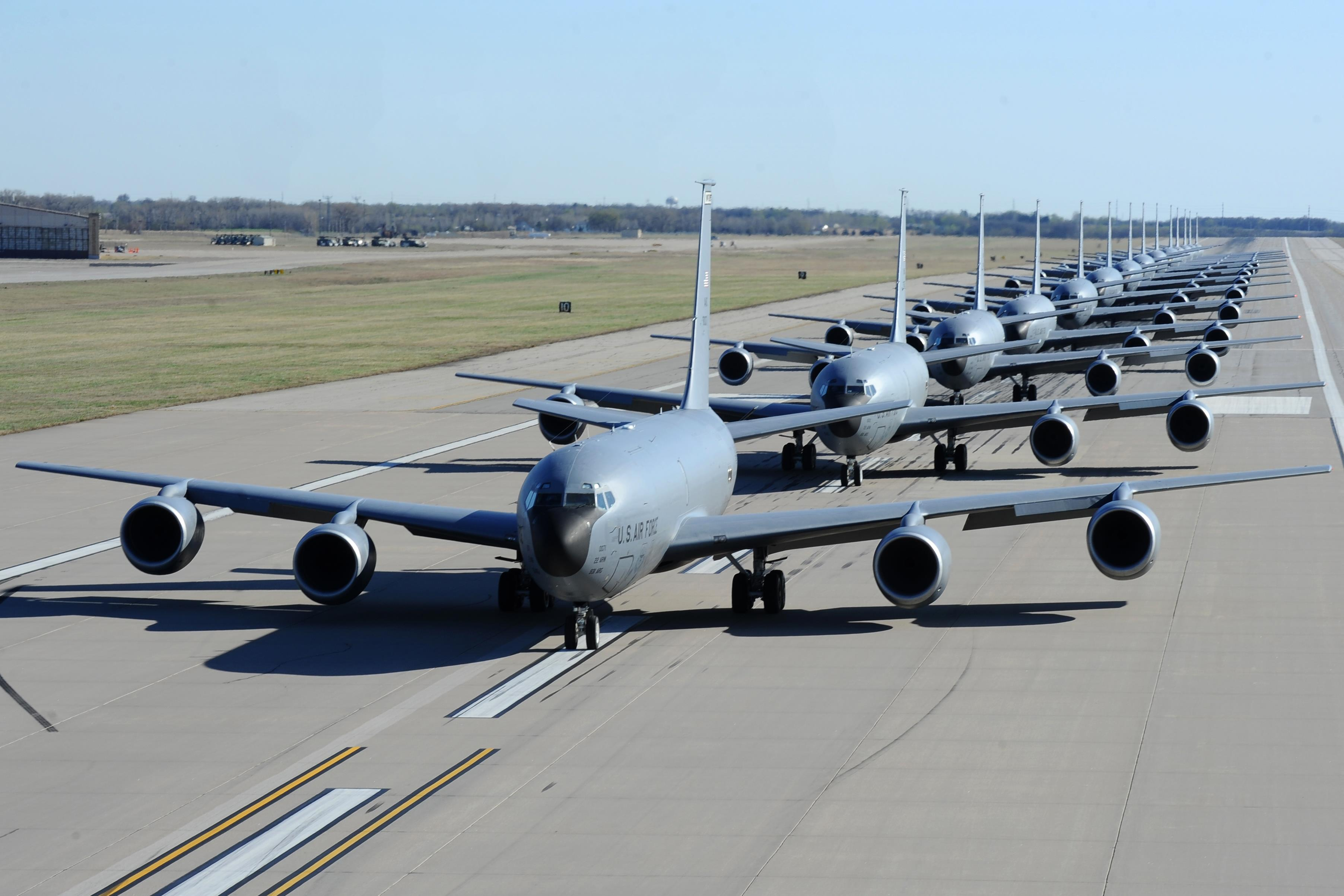
Several re-engined KC-135R aircraft performing an elephant walk. The new engines are CFM56-2 high-bypass turbofans.

Winning the contract to re-engine the KC-135 tanker fleet for the USAF would be a huge boon to the CFM56 project (with more than 600 aircraft available to re-engine), and CFMI aggressively pursued that goal as soon as the Request For Proposals (RFP) was announced in 1977. Like other aspects of the program, international politics played their part in this contract. In efforts to boost the CFM56's chances versus its competitors, the Pratt & Whitney TF33 and an updated Pratt & Whitney JT8D, the French government announced in 1978 that they would upgrade their 11 KC-135s with the CFM56, providing one of the first orders for the engine.

The USAF announced the CFM56 as the winner of the re-engine contract in January 1980. Officials indicated that they were excited at the prospect of replacing the Pratt & Whitney J57 engines currently flying on the KC-135A aircraft, calling them "...the noisiest, dirtiest, [and] most fuel inefficient powerplant still flying" at the time. The re-engined aircraft was designated the KC-135R. The CFM56 brought many benefits to the KC-135, decreasing takeoff distance by as much as 3,500 ft (1,100 m), decreasing overall fuel usage by 25%, greatly reducing noise (24 dB lower) and lowering total life cycle cost. With those benefits in mind, the United States Navy selected the CFM56-2 to power their variant of the Boeing 707, the E-6 Mercury, in 1982. In 1984 the Royal Saudi Air Force selected the CFM56-2 to power their E-3 Sentry aircraft (also related to the 707 airframe). The CFM56-2-powered E-3 also became the standard configuration for aircraft purchased by the British and French.

==== DC-8 ====
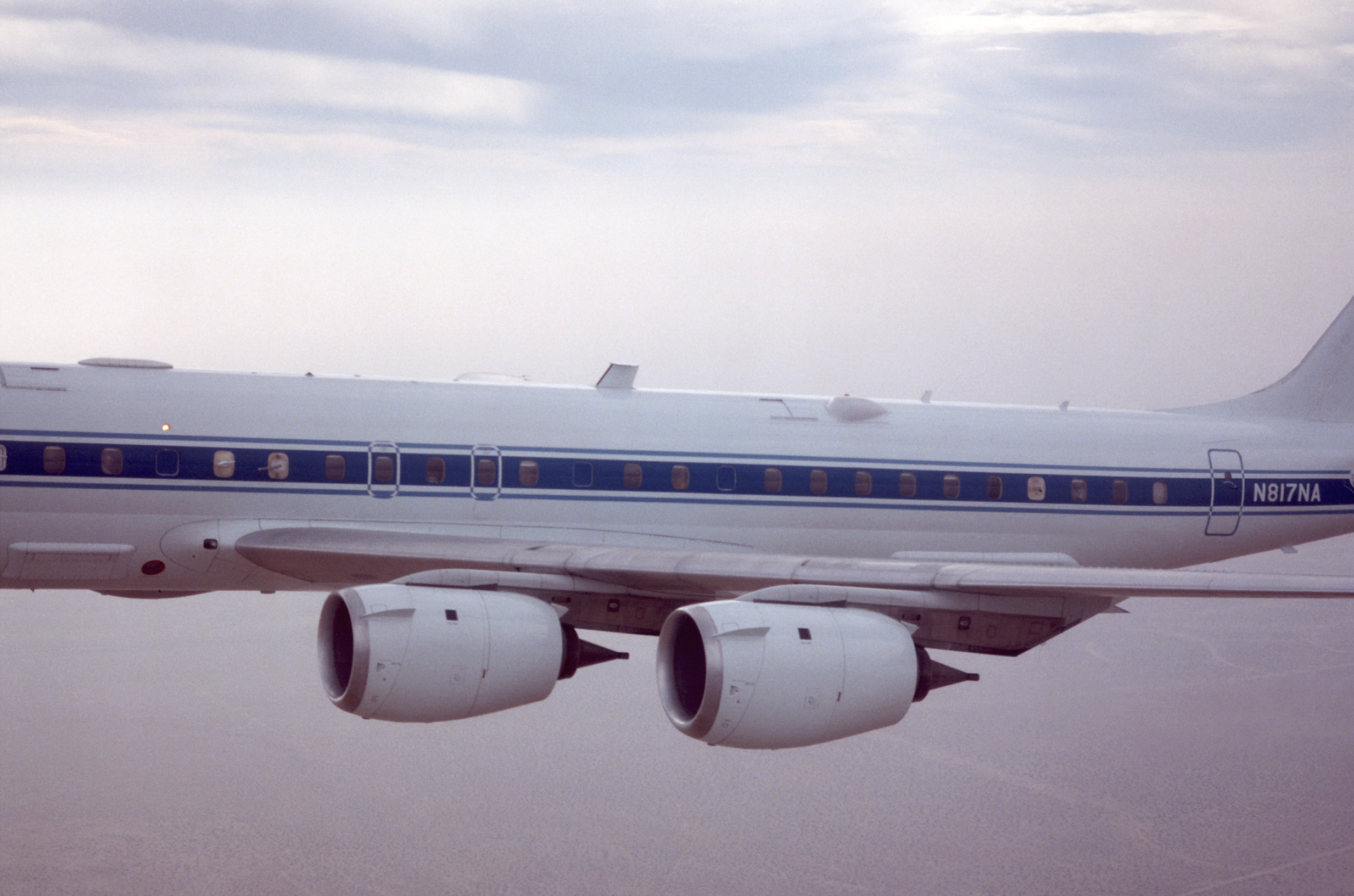
The CFM-56 installed on the DC-8

By the end of the 1970s, airlines were considering upgrading their aging Douglas DC-8 aircraft as an alternative to buying new quieter and more efficient aircraft. Following the French KC-135 order in 1978, the April 1979 decision by United Airlines to upgrade 30 of their DC-8-61 aircraft with the CFM56-2 was important for securing the development of the CFM56; GE and Snecma were two weeks away from freezing development had that order not materialized. This decision marked the first commercial purchase (rather than government/military) of the engine, and Delta Air Lines and Flying Tiger Line soon followed suit, giving the CFM56 a firm footing in both the military and commercial market.

==== Boeing 737 ====
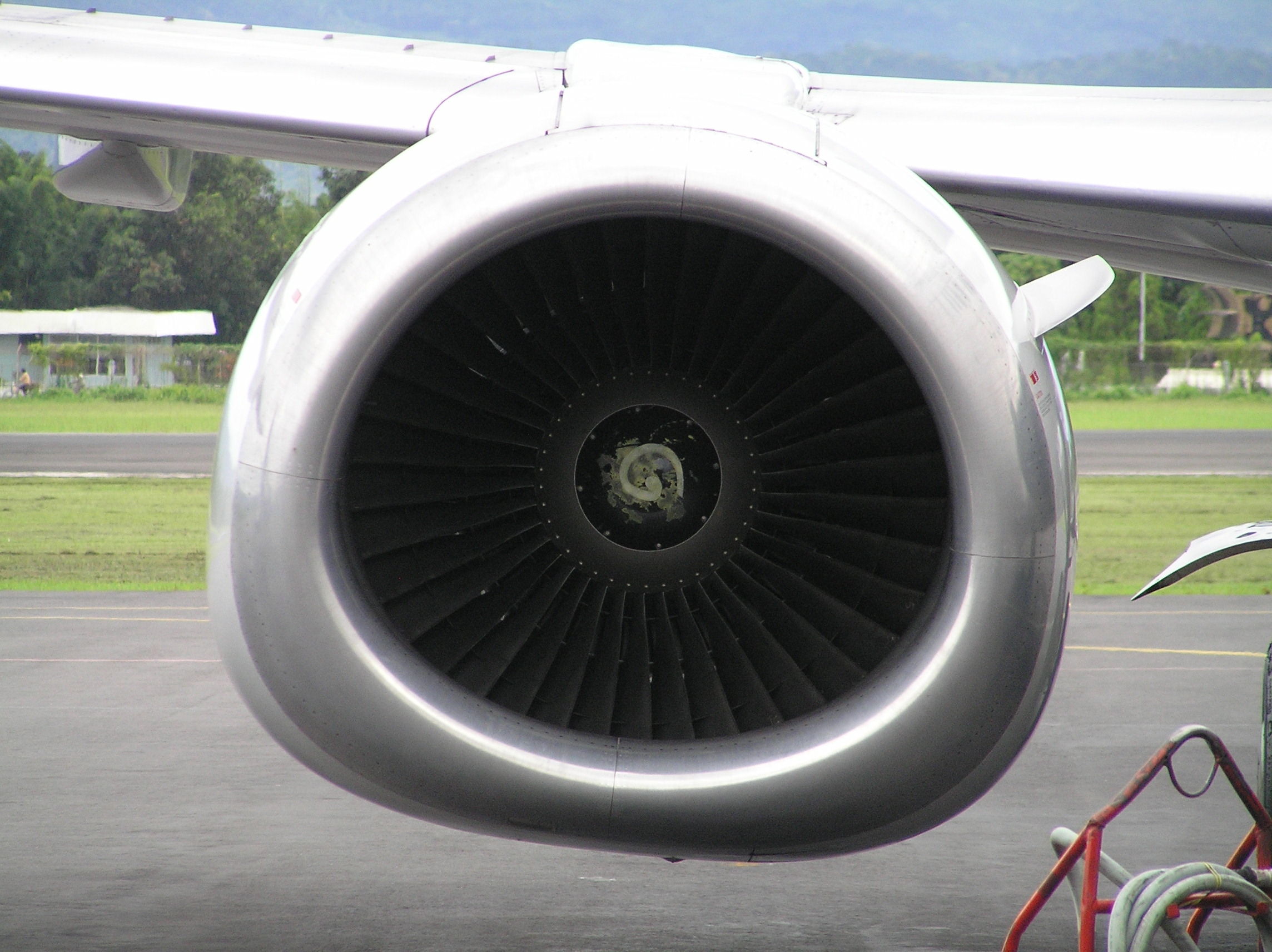
Engine inlet of a CFM56-3 engine on a Boeing 737-400 series showing the non-circular design

In the early 1980s Boeing selected the CFM56-3 to exclusively power the Boeing 737-300 variant. The 737 wings were closer to the ground than previous applications for the CFM56, necessitating several modifications to the engine. The fan diameter was reduced, which reduced the bypass ratio, and the engine accessory gearbox was moved from the bottom of the engine (the 6 o'clock position) to the 9 o'clock position, giving the engine nacelle its distinctive flat-bottomed shape. The overall thrust was also reduced, from 24,000 to 20,000 lbf (107 to 89 kN), mostly due to the reduction in bypass ratio.

Since the small initial launch order for twenty 737-300s split between two airlines, over 5,000 Boeing 737 aircraft had been delivered with CFM56 turbofans by April 2010.

=== Continued development ===
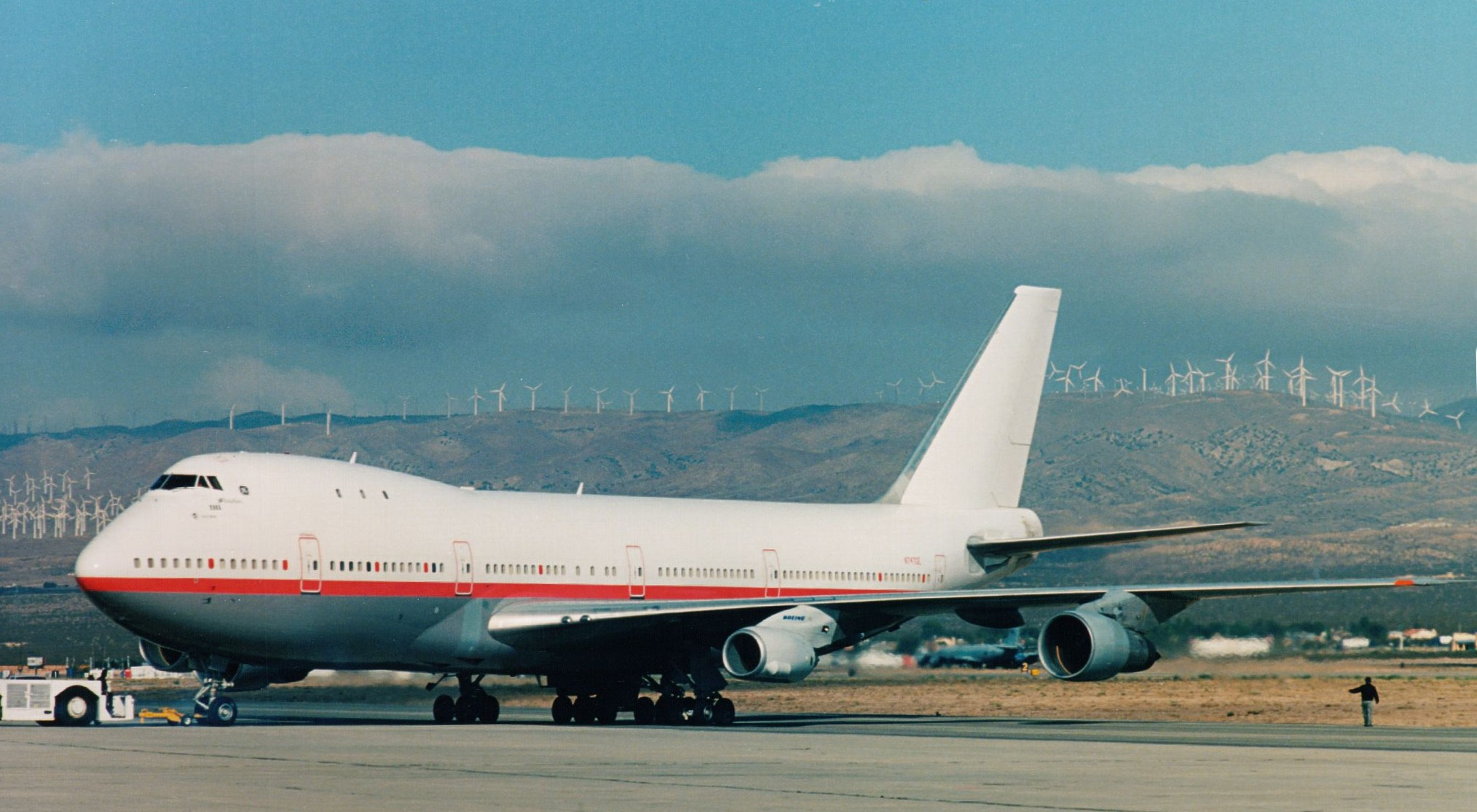
The CFM56 being tested on GE's 747 in 2002

==== Tech56 and Tech Insertion ====
In 1998, CFMI launched the "Tech56" development and demonstration program to create an engine for the new single-aisle aircraft that were expected to be built by Airbus and Boeing. The program focused on developing a large number of new technologies for the theoretical future engine, not necessarily creating an all-new design. When it became clear that Boeing and Airbus were not going to build all-new aircraft to replace the 737 and A320, CFMI decided to apply some of those Tech56 technologies to the CFM56 in the form of the "Tech Insertion" program which focused on three areas: fuel efficiency, maintenance costs and emissions. Launched in 2004, the package included redesigned high-pressure compressor blades, an improved combustor, and improved high- and low-pressure turbine components which resulted in better fuel efficiency and lower nitrogen oxides (NO_{x}) emissions. The new components also reduced engine wear, lowering maintenance costs by about 5%. The engines entered service in 2007, and all new CFM56-5B and CFM56-7B engines are being built with the Tech Insertion components. CFMI also offers the components as an upgrade kit for existing engines.

==== CFM56-7B "Evolution" ====
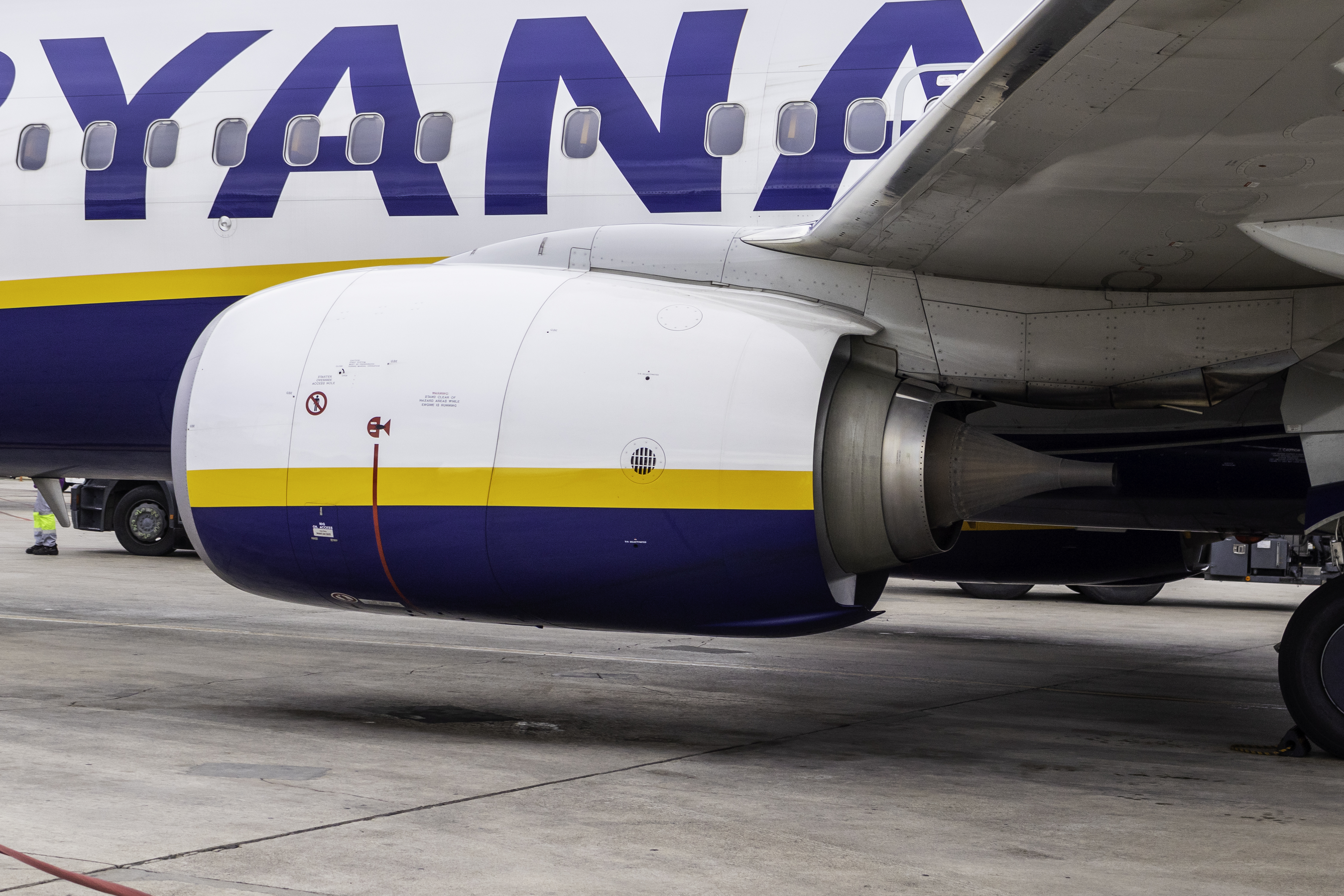
A CFM56-7BE with new nacelle.

In 2009, CFMI announced the latest upgrade to the CFM56 engine, the "CFM56-7B Evolution" or CFM56-7BE. This upgrade, announced with improvements to Boeing's 737 Next Generation, further enhances the high- and low-pressure turbines with better aerodynamics, as well as improving engine cooling, and aims to reduce overall part count. CFMI expected the changes to result in a 4% reduction in maintenance costs and a 1% improvement in fuel consumption (2% improvement including the airframe changes for the new 737); flight and ground tests completed in May 2010 revealed that the fuel burn improvement was better than expected at 1.6%. Following 450 hours of testing, the CFM56-7BE engine was certified by FAA and EASA on 30 July 2010 and delivered from mid-2011.

The CFM56-5B/3 PIP (Performance Improvement Package) engine includes these new technologies and hardware changes to lower fuel burn and lower maintenance cost. Airbus A320s were to use this engine version starting in late 2011.

==== LEAP ====
The LEAP is a new engine design based on and designed to replace the CFM56 series, with 16% efficiency savings by using more composite materials and achieving higher bypass ratios of over 10:1. LEAP entered service in 2016.

==== Electric power generation ====
FTAI Aviation in 2026 announced plans to rebuild 100 CFM56 engines annually into 25-megawatt aeroderivative electric power turbines.

== Operational history ==
As of June 2016, the CFM56 is the most-used high-bypass turbofan. It has achieved more than 800 million engine flight hours, and at a rate of one million flight hours every eight days it is expected to have achieved one billion flight hours by 2020. It has more than 550 operators and more than 2,400 CFM56-powered jet aircraft are in the air at any given moment. It is known for its dependability: its average time on wing is 30,000 hours before a first shop visit, with the current fleet record at 50,000 hours.

As of July 2016, 30,000 engines have been built: 9,860 CFM56-5 engines for the Airbus A320ceo and A340-200/300 and more than 17,300 CFM56-3/-7B engines for the Boeing 737 Classic and 737NG. In July 2016, CFM had 3,000 engines in backlog. Lufthansa, launch customer for the CFM56-5C-powered A340, has an engine with more than 100,000 flight hours, having entered commercial service on 16 November 1993, and overhauled four times since. In 2016 CFM delivered 1,665 CFM56 and booked 876 orders, it plans to produce CFM56 spare parts until 2045.

By October 2017, CFM had delivered more than 31,000 engines and 24,000 were in service with 560 operators, it attained 500 million flight cycles and 900 million flight hours, including over 170 million cycles and 300 million hours since 1998 for the B737NG's -7B and over 100 million cycles and 180 million hours for the A320ceo's -5B since 1996. By June 2018, 32,645 were delivered. Strong demand will extend production to 2020, up from 2019.

Exhaust gas temperature margin erodes with usage. One or two performance restoration shop visits, costing $0.3-$0.6m for a -5 series, can be performed before taking the engine off wing, which can restore 60% to 80% of the original margin. Once restored, the life limited parts must be replaced after: 20,000 cycles for the hot section ($0.5m), 25,000 for the axial compressor, and 30,000 for the fan and booster ($0.5m-$0.7m) for a recent CFM56. The whole engine parts cost more than $3m, $3.5 to $4m with the shop work-hours, around $150 per cycle.

By June 2019, the CFM56 fleet had surpassed one billion engine flight hours (nearly 115,000 years), having carried more than 35 billion people, over eight million times around the world.

The CFM56 production will wind down as the final 737NG engine was delivered in 2019 and the last A320ceo engine will be delivered in May 2020. Production will continue at low levels for military 737s and spare engines and will conclude around 2024.

Unit cost: US$10 million (list price)

== Design ==
=== Summary ===
The CFM56 is a high-bypass turbofan engine (most of the air accelerated by the fan bypasses the core of the engine and is exhausted out of the fan case) with several variants having bypass ratios ranging from 5:1 to 6:1, generating 18,500 to 34,000 lbf (80 kN to 150 kN) of thrust. The variants share a common design, and differ only in details. The CFM56 is a two-shaft (or two-spool) engine, meaning that there are two rotating shafts, one high-pressure and one low-pressure. Each is powered by its own turbine section (the high-pressure and low-pressure turbines, respectively). The fan and the booster (low-pressure compressor) evolved over the different iterations of the engine, as did the compressor, combustor and turbine sections.

=== Combustor ===
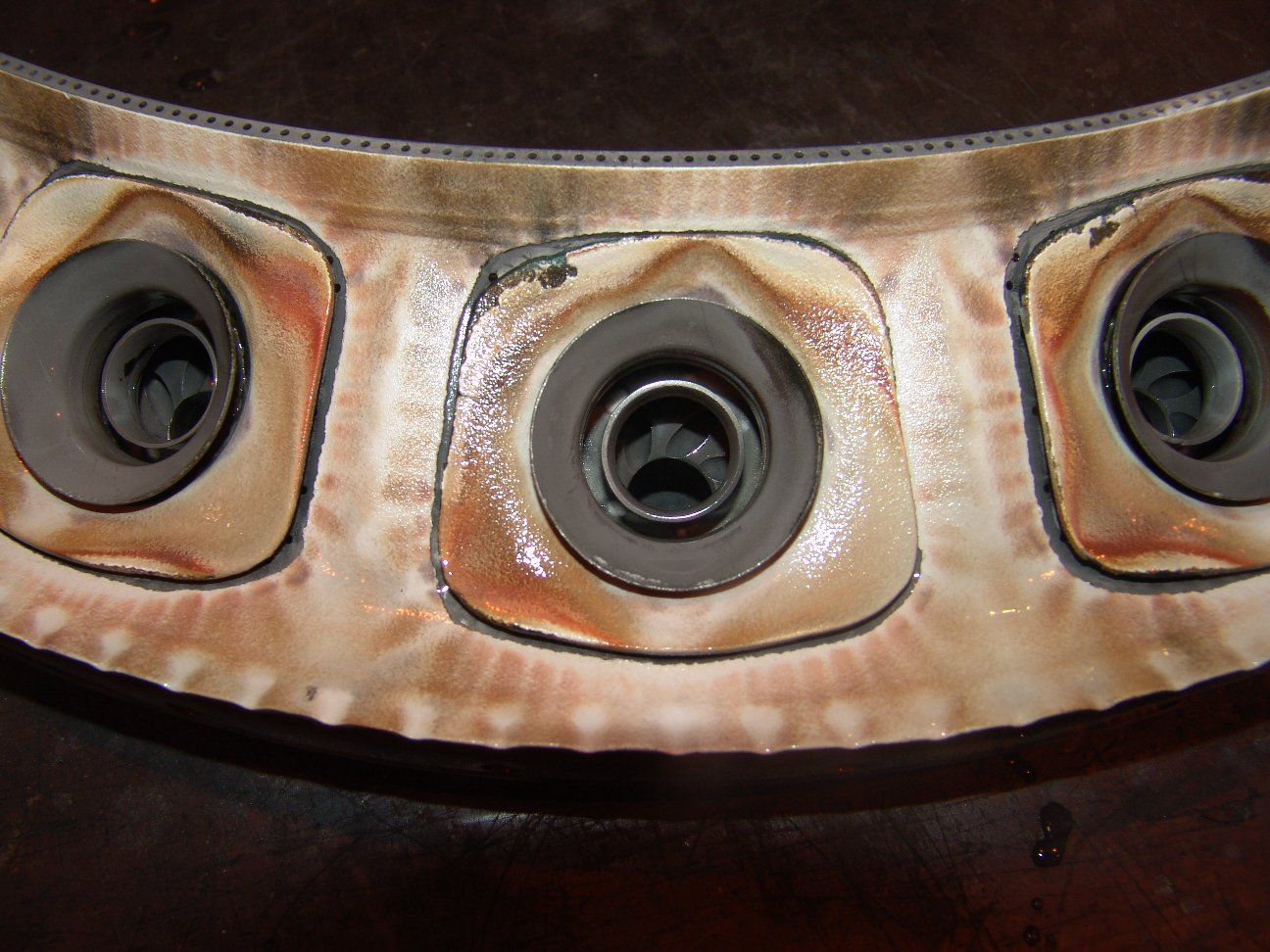
Swirl fuel nozzles of a CFM56 annular combustor

Most variants of the CFM56 feature a single-annular combustor. An annular combustor is a continuous ring where fuel is injected into the airflow and ignited, raising the pressure and temperature of the flow. This contrasts with a can combustor, where each combustion chamber is separate, and a cannular combustor which is a hybrid of the two. Fuel injection is regulated by a hydromechanical unit (HMU) built by Honeywell. It regulates the amount of fuel delivered to the engine by means of an electrohydraulic servo valve that, in turn, drives a fuel metering valve, that provides information to the full authority digital engine controller (FADEC).

In 1989, CFMI began work on a new, double-annular combustor. Instead of having just one combustion zone, the double-annular combustor has a second combustion zone that is used at high thrust levels. This design lowers the emissions of both nitrogen oxides (NO_{x}) and carbon dioxide (CO_{2}). The first CFM56 engine with the double-annular combustor entered service in 1995, and the combustor is used on CFM56-5B and CFM56-7B variants with the suffix "/2" on their nameplates.

GE started developing and testing a new type of combustor called the Twin Annular Premixing Swirler combustor, or "TAPS", during the Tech 56 program. This design is similar to the double-annular combustor in that it has two combustion zones; this combustor "swirls" the flow, creating an ideal fuel–air mixture. This difference allows the combustor to generate much less NO_{x} than other combustors. Tests on a CFM56-7B engine demonstrated an improvement of 46% over single-annular combustors and 22% over double-annular combustors. The analytical tools developed for TAPS have also been used to improve other combustors, notably the single-annular combustors in some CFM56-5B and -7B engines.

=== Compressor ===
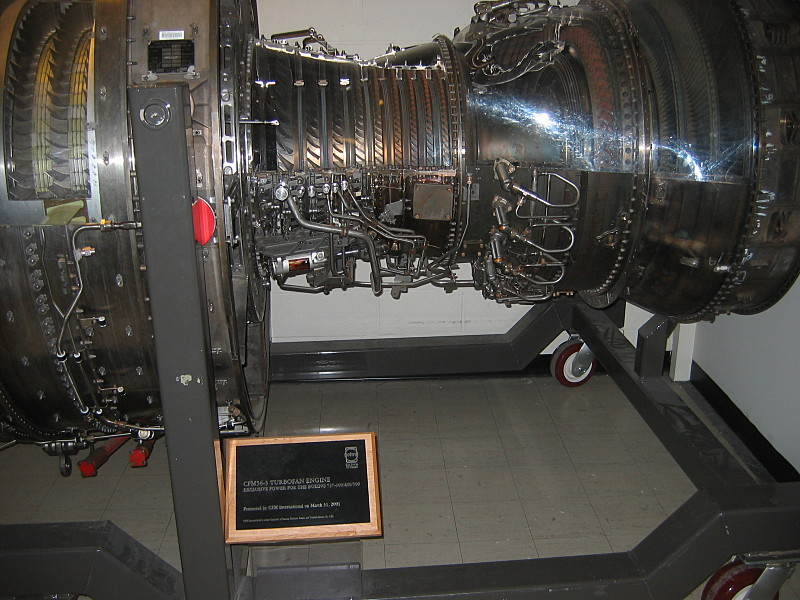
CFM56-3 showing 3 stages of LP compressor at left (section of bypass duct removed) and 9 stages of HP compressor

The high-pressure compressor (HPC), that was at the center of the original export controversy, features nine stages in all variants of the CFM56. The compressor stages have been developed from GE's "GE^{1/9} core" (namely a single-turbine, nine-compressor stage design) which was designed in a compact core rotor. The small span of the compressor radius meant that the entire engine could be lighter and smaller, as the accessory units in the system (bearings, oiling systems) could be merged to the main fueling system running on aviation fuel. As design evolved HPC design improved through better airfoil design. As part of the Tech-56 improvement program CFMI has tested the new CFM-56 model with six-stage high-pressure compressor stages (discs that make up the compressor system) that was designed to deliver same pressure ratios (pressure gain 30) similar to the old nine-stages compressor design. The new one was not fully replacing the old one, but it offered an upgrade in HPC, thanks to improved blade dynamics, as a part of their "Tech Insertion" management plan from 2007.

=== Exhaust ===
CFMI tested both a mixed and unmixed exhaust design at the beginning of development; most variants of the engine have an unmixed exhaust nozzle. Only the high-power CFM56-5C, designed for the Airbus A340, has a mixed-flow exhaust nozzle.

GE and Snecma also tested the effectiveness of chevrons on reducing jet noise. (Note: Chevron is the name for sawtooth cutouts that are sometimes applied to the exhaust nozzles of jet engines to reduce the jet noise. An example can be seen here. (The pictured engine is not a CFM56.)) After examining configurations in the wind tunnel, CFMI chose to flight-test chevrons built into the core exhaust nozzle. The chevrons reduced jet noise by 1.3 perceived loudness decibels during takeoff conditions, and are now offered as an option with the CFM56 for the Airbus A321.

=== Fan and booster ===
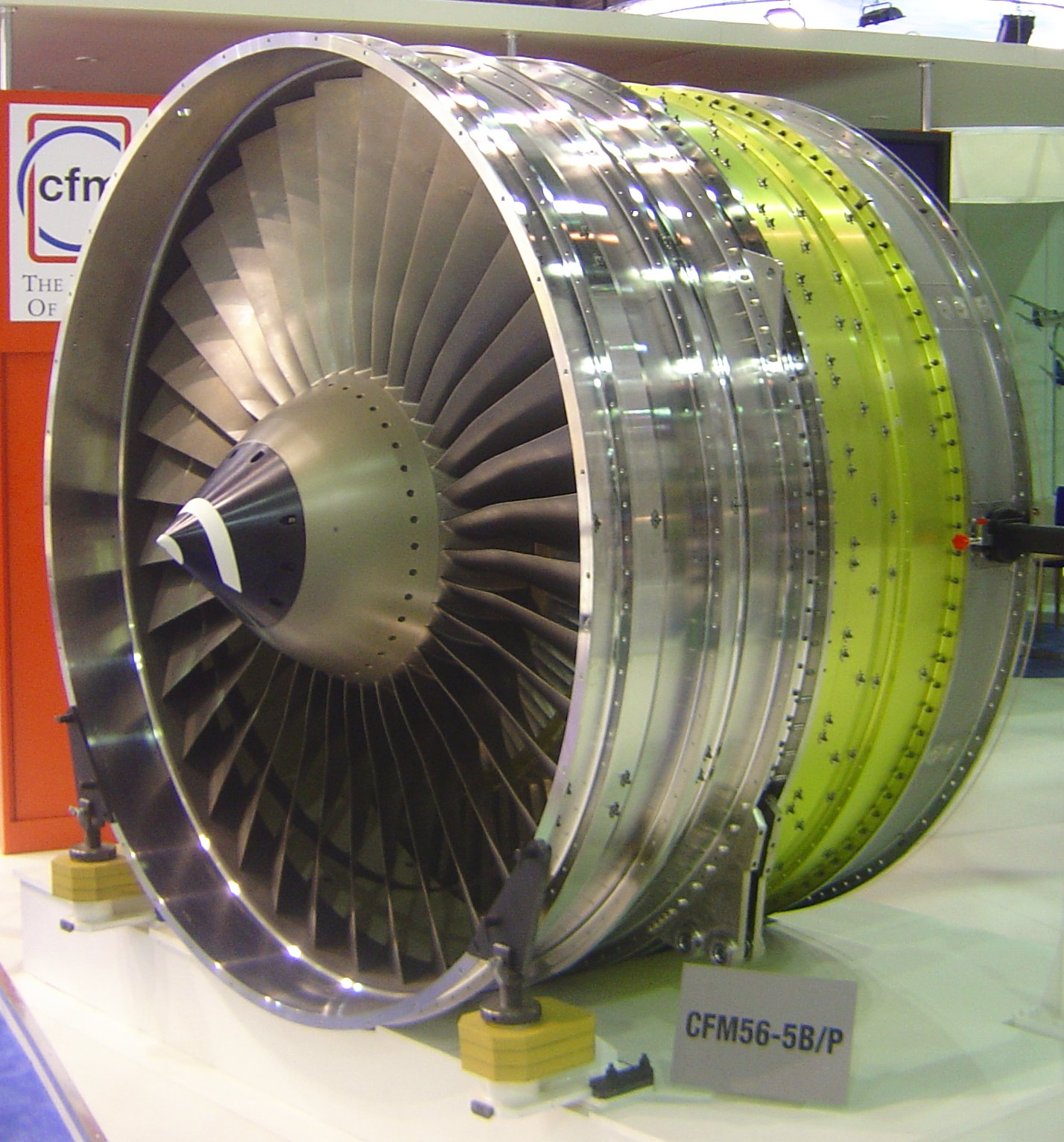
Fan and fan case of a CFM56-5

The CFM56 features a single-stage fan, and most variants have a three-stage booster on the low-pressure shaft, (Note: The Low-Pressure Shaft, in a two-shaft engine, is the shaft that is turned by the low-pressure turbine (LPT). Generally the fan section(s) and the booster section(s) (also known as the "low-pressure compressor") are located on the low-pressure shaft.) with four stages in the -5B and -5C variants. The booster is also commonly called the "low-pressure compressor" (LPC) as it is part of the low-pressure spool and continues the air compression done by the inner part of the fan before it reaches the high-pressure compressor. The original CFM56-2 variant featured 44 tip-shrouded fan blades, (Note: Shrouds are plates that are a part of a fan (or compressor, or turbine) blade. Generally, the shroud of one blade rests on the shroud of the adjacent blade, forming a continuous ring. Shrouds in the middle of blades are often used to dampen vibrations. Shrouds at the tips of fan blades are often used to minimize air leakage around the tips. A midspan shroud is visible on the fan blades here . (Note that these fan blades are not from a CFM56.) (Gunston, Bill (2004). Cambridge Aerospace Dictionary. Cambridge University Press. 2004. p.558-9.)) although the number of fan blades was reduced in later variants as wide-chord blade technology developed, down to 22 blades in the CFM56-7 variant.

The CFM56 fan features dovetailed fan blades which allows them to be replaced without removing the entire engine, and GE/Snecma claim that the CFM56 was the first engine to have that capability. This attachment method is useful for circumstances where only a few fan blades need to be repaired or replaced, such as following bird strikes.

The fan diameter varies with the different models of the CFM56, and that change has a direct impact on the engine performance. For example, the low-pressure shaft rotates at the same speed for both the CFM56-2 and the CFM56-3 models; the fan diameter is smaller on the -3, which lowers the tip speed of the fan blades. The lower speed allows the fan blades to operate more efficiently (5.5% more in this case), which increases the overall fuel efficiency of the engine (improving specific fuel consumption nearly 3%).

=== Thrust reverser ===
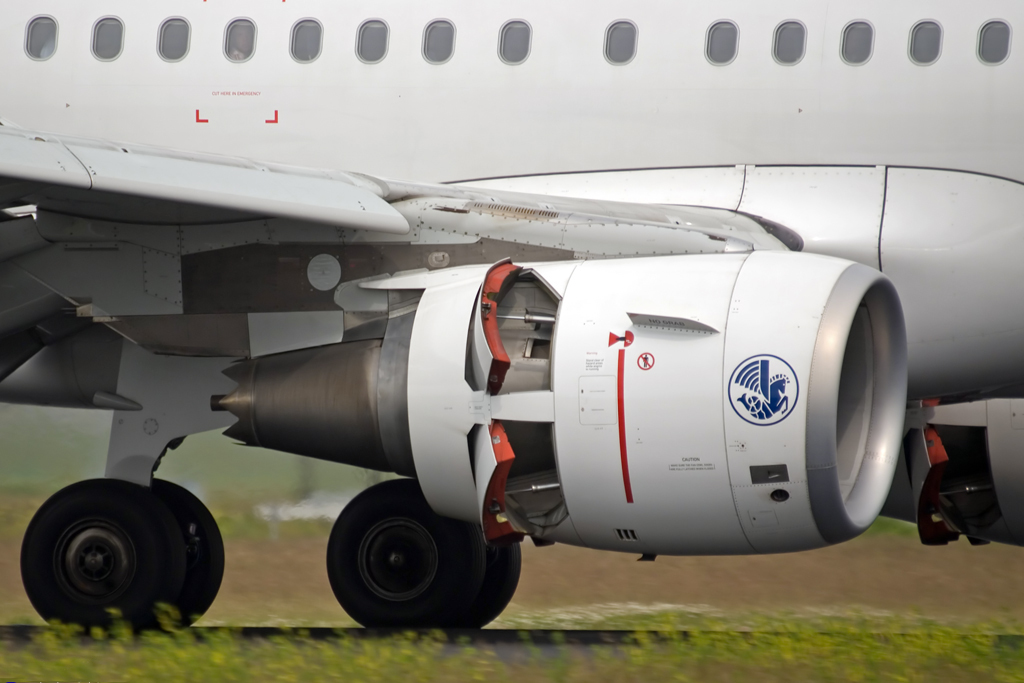
Pivoting-door thrust reversers are installed on the CFM56-5. Noise-reducing chevrons can also be seen at the engine's rear.

The CFM56 is designed to support several thrust reverser systems which help slow and stop the aircraft after landing. The variants built for the Boeing 737, the CFM56-3 and the CFM56-7, use a cascade type of thrust reverser. This type of thrust reverse consists of sleeves that slide back to expose mesh-like cascades and blocker doors that block the bypass air flow. The blocked bypass air is forced through the cascades, reducing the thrust of the engine and slowing the aircraft down.

The CFM56 also supports pivoting-door type thrust reversers. This type is used on the CFM56-5 engines that power many Airbus aircraft such as the Airbus A320. They work by actuating a door that pivots down into the bypass duct, both blocking the bypass air and deflecting the flow outward, creating the reverse thrust.

=== Turbine ===
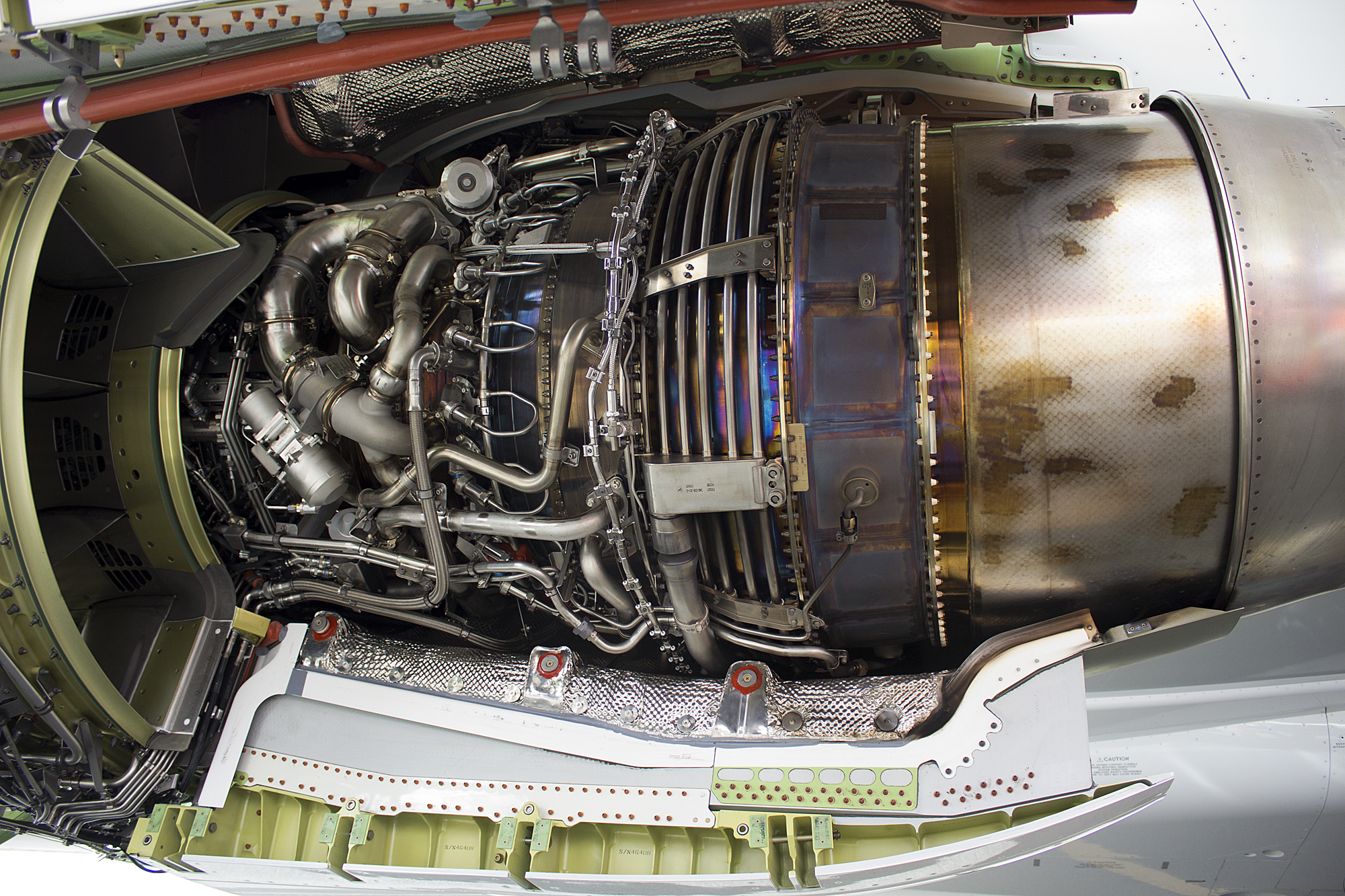
Cooling air tubes (for control of the clearance between the turbine blade tips and the shroud) circle the iridescent turbine casing on a CFM56-7B26.

All variants of the CFM56 feature a single-stage high-pressure turbine (HPT). In some variants, the HPT blades are "grown" from a single crystal superalloy, giving them high strength and creep resistance. The low-pressure turbine (LPT) features four stages in most variants of the engine, but the CFM56-5C has a five-stage LPT. This change was implemented to drive the larger fan on this variant. Improvements to the turbine section were examined during the Tech56 program, and one development was an aerodynamically optimized low-pressure turbine blade design, which would have used 20% fewer blades for the whole low-pressure turbine, saving weight. Some of those Tech56 improvements made their way into the Tech Insertion package, where the turbine section was updated. The turbine section was updated again in the "Evolution" upgrade.

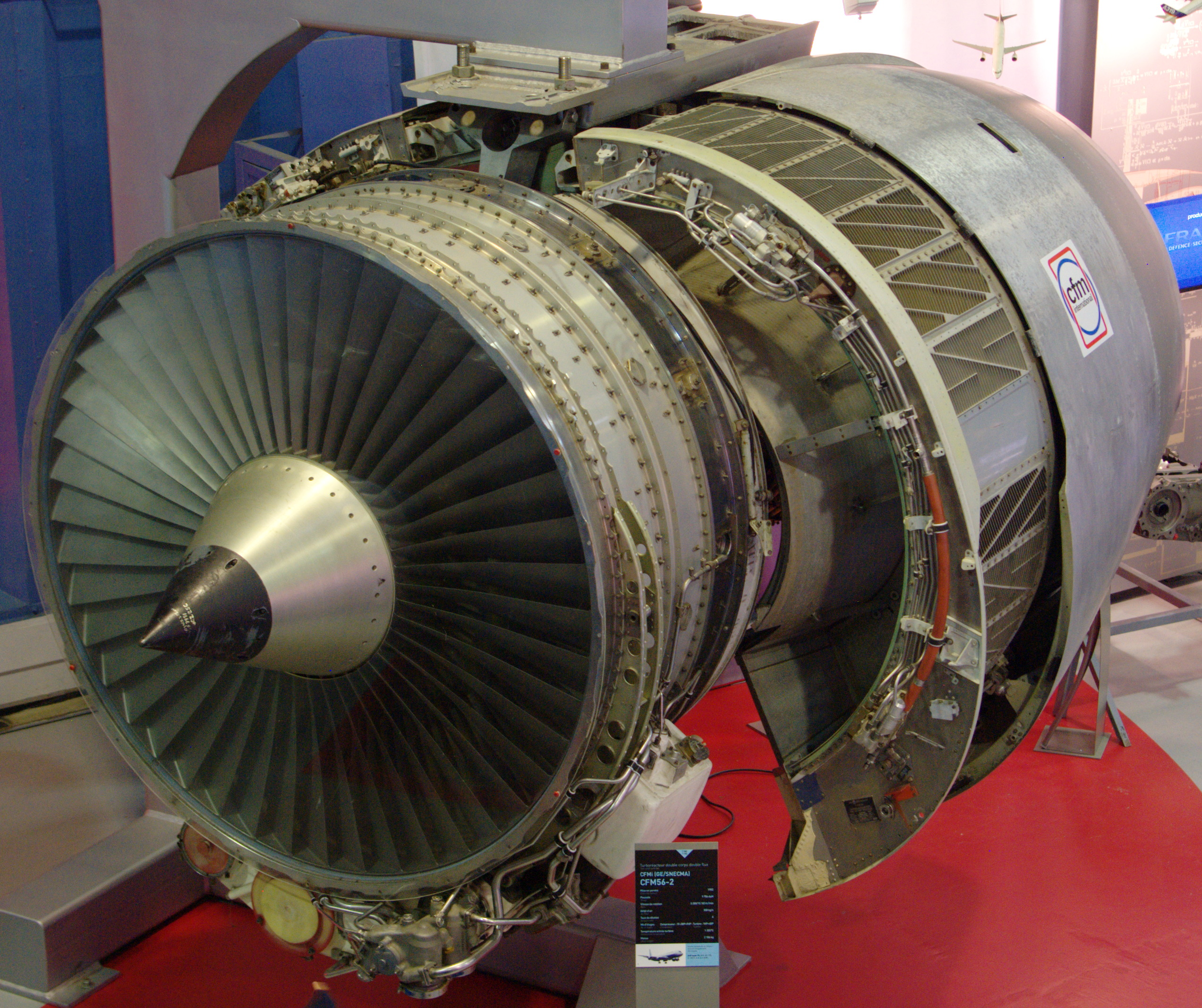
An original CFM56-2 at the Safran museum

The high-pressure turbine stages in the CFM56 are internally cooled by air from the high-pressure compressor. The air passes through internal channels in each blade and ejects at the leading and trailing edges.

== Variants ==
=== CFM56-2 series ===
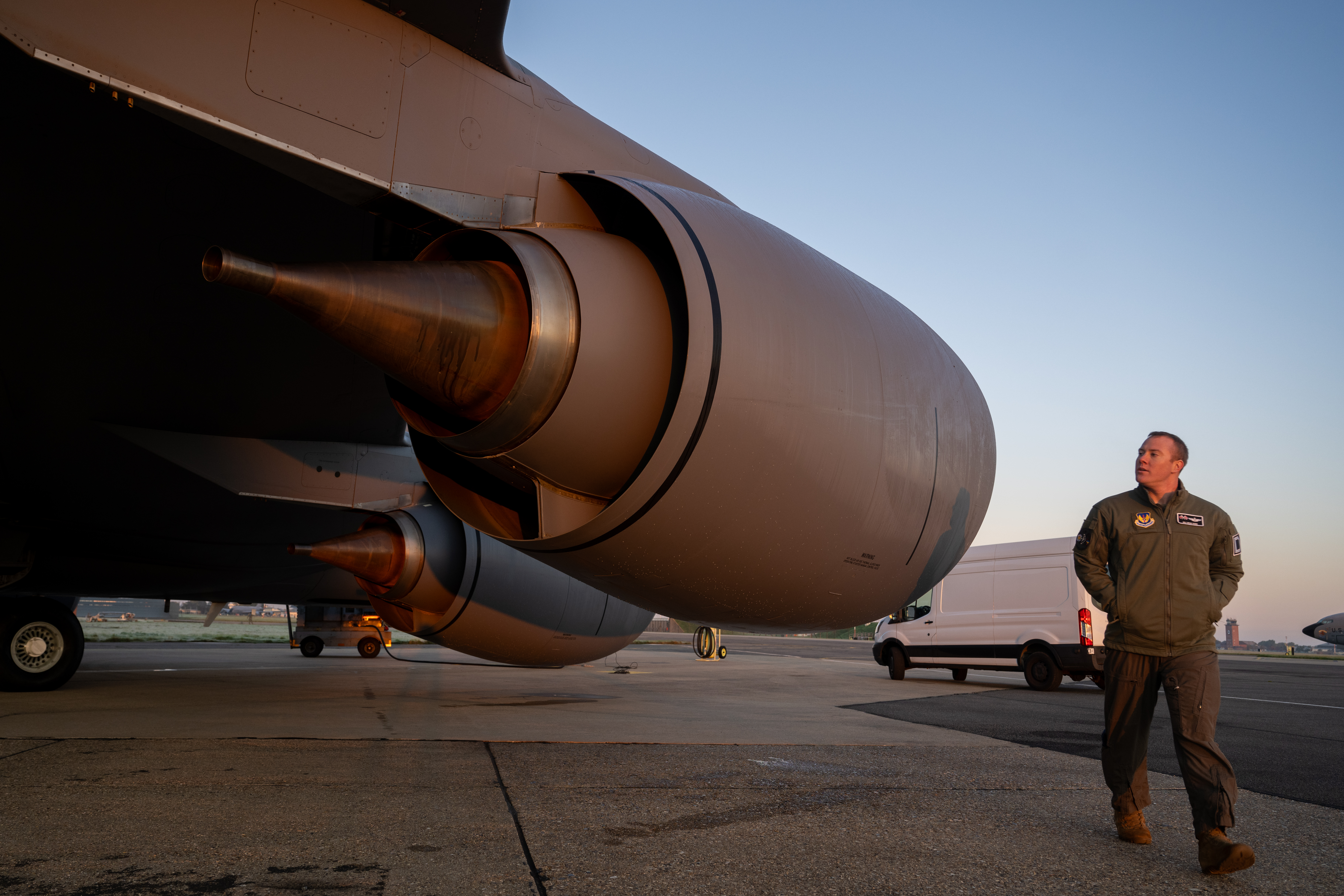
The CFM56-2 on a Royal Air Force RC-135.

The CFM56-2 series is the original variant of the CFM56. It is most widely used in military applications where it is known as the F108; specifically in the KC-135, the E-6 Mercury and some E-3 Sentry aircraft. The CFM56-2 comprises a single-stage fan with 44 blades, with a three-stage LP compressor driven by a four-stage LP turbine, and a nine-stage HP compressor driven by a single-stage HP turbine. The combustor is annular. It was also used in Douglas's DC-8 "Super 70s" aircraft, which reengined the previous Super 60s.

Model	Thrust	BPR	OPR	Dry weight (Note: Dry Weight is the weight of an engine without any fluids in it, such as fuel, oil, hydraulic fluid, etc. Very similar to the dry weight of an automobile)	Applications
CFM56-2A2 (A3)	24,000 lbf (110 kN)	5.9	31.8	4,820 lb (2,190 kg)	E-3 Sentry, E-6 Mercury
CFM56-2B1	22,000 lbf (98 kN)	6.0	30.5	4,671 lb (2,120 kg)	KC-135R Stratotanker, RC-135
CFM56-2C1	22,000 lbf (98 kN)	6.0	31.3	4,635 lb (2,100 kg)	Douglas DC-8-70

=== CFM56-3 series ===
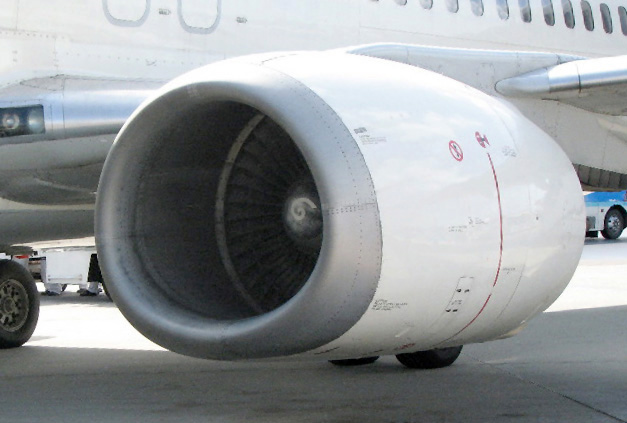
A CFM56-3–series engine mounted on a Boeing 737-400 airliner, showing flattening of the nacelle at the bottom of the inlet lip

The first derivative of the CFM56 series, the CFM56-3 was designed for Boeing 737 Classic series (737-300/-400/-500), with static thrust ratings from 18,500 to 23,500 lbf (82.3 to 105 kN). A "cropped fan" derivative of the -2, the -3 engine has a smaller fan diameter at 60 in (1.5 m) but retains the original basic engine layout. The new fan was primarily derived from GE's CF6-80 turbofan rather than the CFM56-2, and the booster was redesigned to match the new fan.

A significant challenge for this series was achieving ground clearance for the wing-mounted engine. This was overcome by reducing the intake fan diameter and relocating the gearbox and other accessories from beneath the engine to the sides. The resulting flattened nacelle bottom and intake lip yielded the distinctive appearance of the Boeing 737 with CFM56 engines.

Model	Thrust	BPR	OPR	Dry weight	Applications
CFM56-3B1	20,000 lbf (89 kN)	6.0	27.5	4,276 lb (1,940 kg)	Boeing 737-300, Boeing 737-500
CFM56-3B2	22,000 lbf (98 kN)	5.9	28.8	4,301 lb (1,950 kg)	Boeing 737-300, Boeing 737-400
CFM56-3C1	23,500 lbf (100 kN)	6.0	30.6	4,301 lb (1,950 kg)	Boeing 737-300, Boeing 737-400, Boeing 737-500

=== CFM56-4 series ===
The CFM56-4 series was a proposed improved version of the CFM56-2 designed for the Airbus A320 family of aircraft. Competing with the RJ500 engine being developed by Rolls-Royce, the -4 series was designed to produce 25,000 lbf (110 kN) and was to feature a new 68 in (1.73 m) fan, a new low-pressure compressor and a full authority digital engine controller (FADEC). Soon after the upgrade project was launched in 1984, International Aero Engines offered their new V2500 engine for the A320. CFMI realized that the CFM56-4 did not compare favorably with the new engine and scrapped the project to begin working on the CFM56-5 series.

=== CFM56-5 series ===
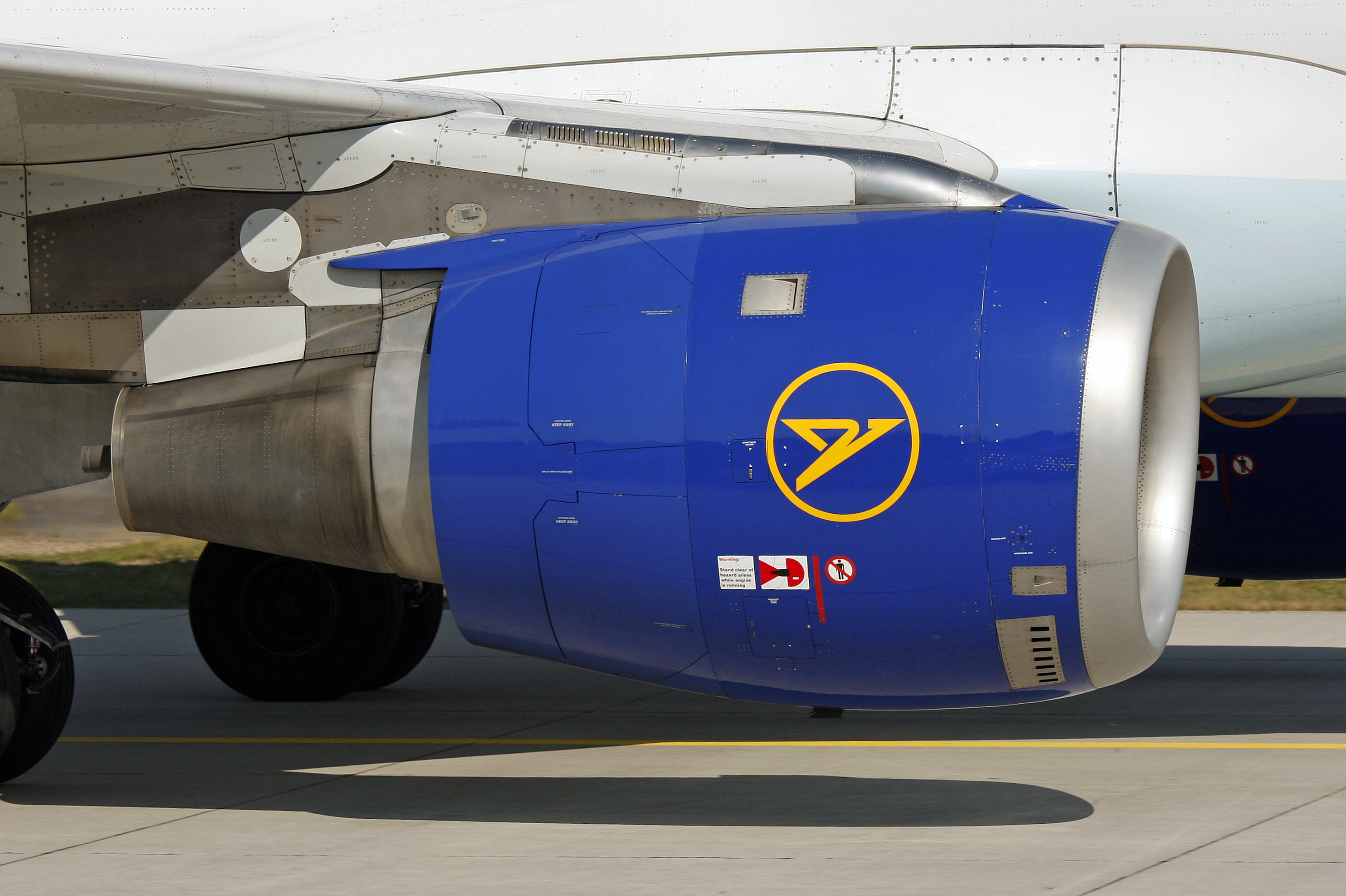
CFM56-5A on an Airbus A320. The CFM56-5A and the improved CFM56-5B can be distinguished by a slightly extended nacelle on the 5B. The two engines are otherwise identical.

The CFM56-5 series is designed for the Airbus aircraft and has a very wide thrust rating of between 22,000 and 34,000 lbf (97.9 and 151 kN). It has three distinct sub-variants; the CFM56-5A, CFM56-5B and CFM56-5C, and differs from its Boeing 737 Classic-fitted cousins by featuring a FADEC and incorporating further aerodynamic design improvements.

==== CFM56-5A series ====
The CFM56-5A series is the initial CFM56-5 series, designed to power the short-to-medium range Airbus A320 family. Derived from the CFM56-2 and CFM56-3 families, the -5A series produces thrusts between 22,000 and 26,500 lbf (98 kN and 118 kN). Aerodynamic improvements such as an updated fan, low-pressure compressor, high-pressure compressor and combustor make this variant 10–11% more fuel efficient than its predecessors.

Model	Thrust	BPR	OPR	Dry weight	Applications
CFM56-5A1	25,000 lbf (111 kN)	6.0	31.3	4,995 lb (2,270 kg)	Airbus A320
CFM56-5A3	26,500 lbf (118 kN)	6.0	31.3	4,995 lb (2,270 kg)	Airbus A320
CFM56-5A4	22,000 lbf (97.9 kN)	6.2	31.3	4,995 lb (2,270 kg)	Airbus A319
CFM56-5A5	23,500 lbf (105 kN)	6.2	31.3	4,995 lb (2,270 kg)	Airbus A319

==== CFM56-5B series ====
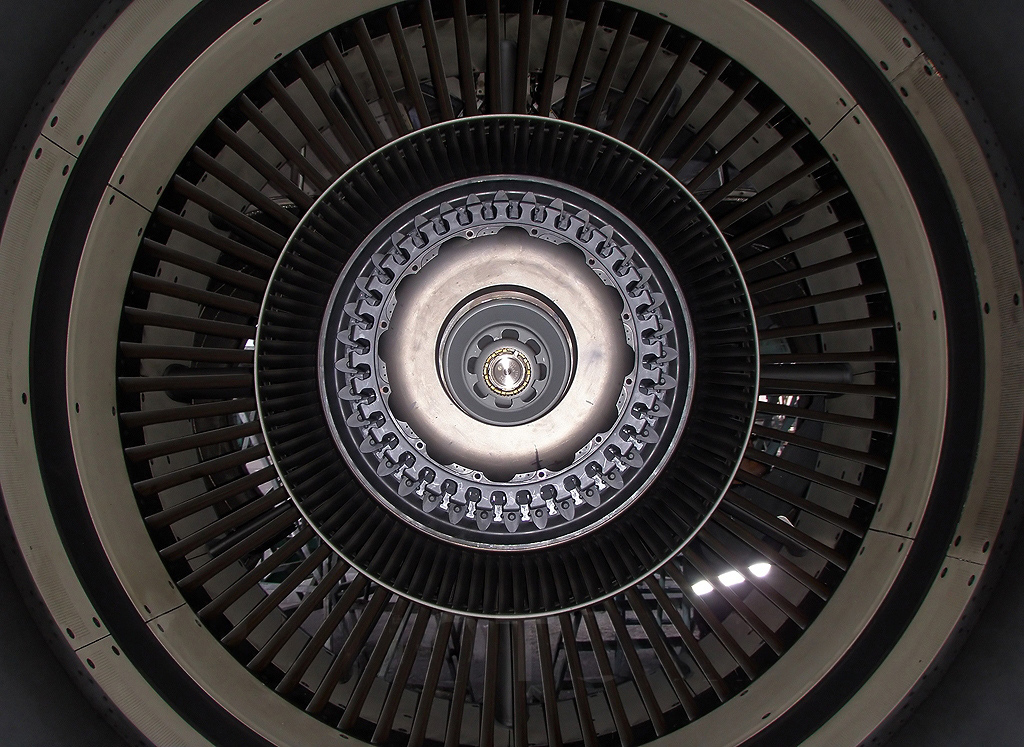
Front view of an A319-112 CFM56-5B6 with its fan removed. The relative sizes of the air passages to the core and bypass duct for a BPR of 6:1 are apparent.

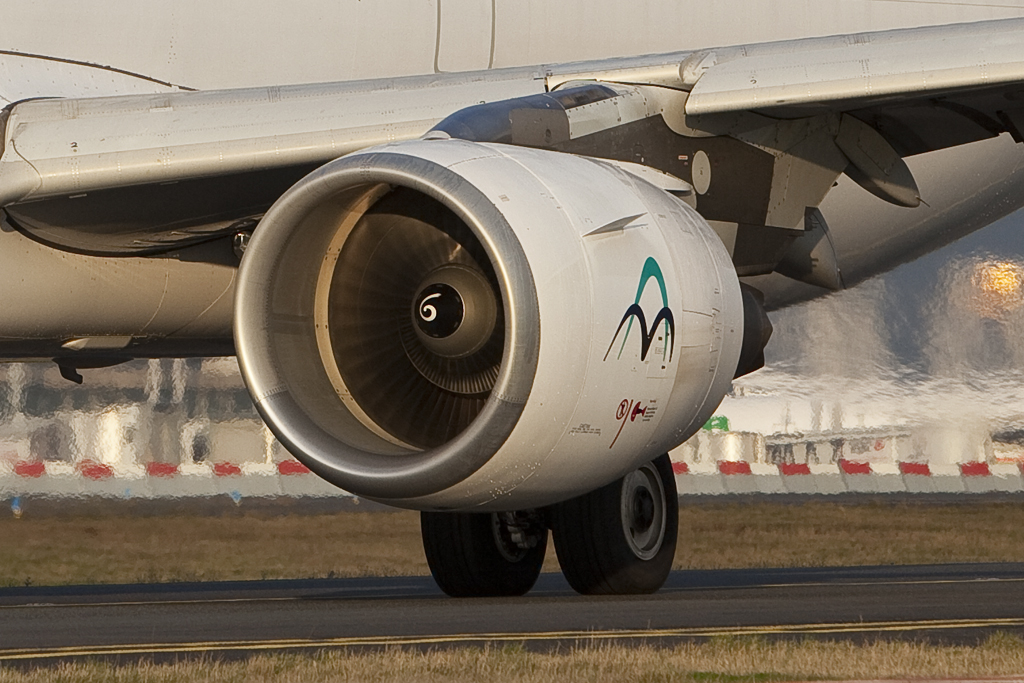
The CFM56-5B3 powering the A321-200

An improvement of the CFM56-5A series, it was originally designed to power the A321. With a thrust range between 22,000 and 33,000 lbf (98 kN and 147 kN) it can power every model in the A320 family (A318/A319/A320/A321) and has superseded the CFM56-5A series. Among the changes from the CFM56-5A is the option of a double-annular combustor that reduces emissions (particularly NO_{x}), a new fan in a longer fan case, and a new low-pressure compressor with a fourth stage (up from three in earlier variants). It is the most numerous engine supplied to Airbus.

Model	Thrust	BPR	OPR	Dry weight	Applications
CFM56-5B1	30,000 lbf (130 kN)	5.5	35.4	5,250 lb (2,380 kg)	Airbus A321
CFM56-5B2	31,000 lbf (140 kN)	5.5	35.4	5,250 lb (2,380 kg)	Airbus A321
CFM56-5B3	33,000 lbf (150 kN)	5.4	35.5	5,250 lb (2,380 kg)	Airbus A321
CFM56-5B4	27,000 lbf (120 kN)	5.7	32.6	5,250 lb (2,380 kg)	Airbus A320
CFM56-5B5	22,000 lbf (98 kN)	6.0	32.6	5,250 lb (2,380 kg)	Airbus A319
CFM56-5B6	23,500 lbf (100 kN)	5.9	32.6	5,250 lb (2,380 kg)	Airbus A319, A320
CFM56-5B7	27,000 lbf (120 kN)	5.7	35.5	5,250 lb (2,380 kg)	Airbus A319, A319CJ
CFM56-5B8	21,600 lbf (96 kN)	6.0	32.6	5,250 lb (2,380 kg)	Airbus A318, A318CJ
CFM56-5B9	23,300 lbf (100 kN)	5.9	32.6	5,250 lb (2,380 kg)	Airbus A318, A318CJ

==== CFM56-5C series ====
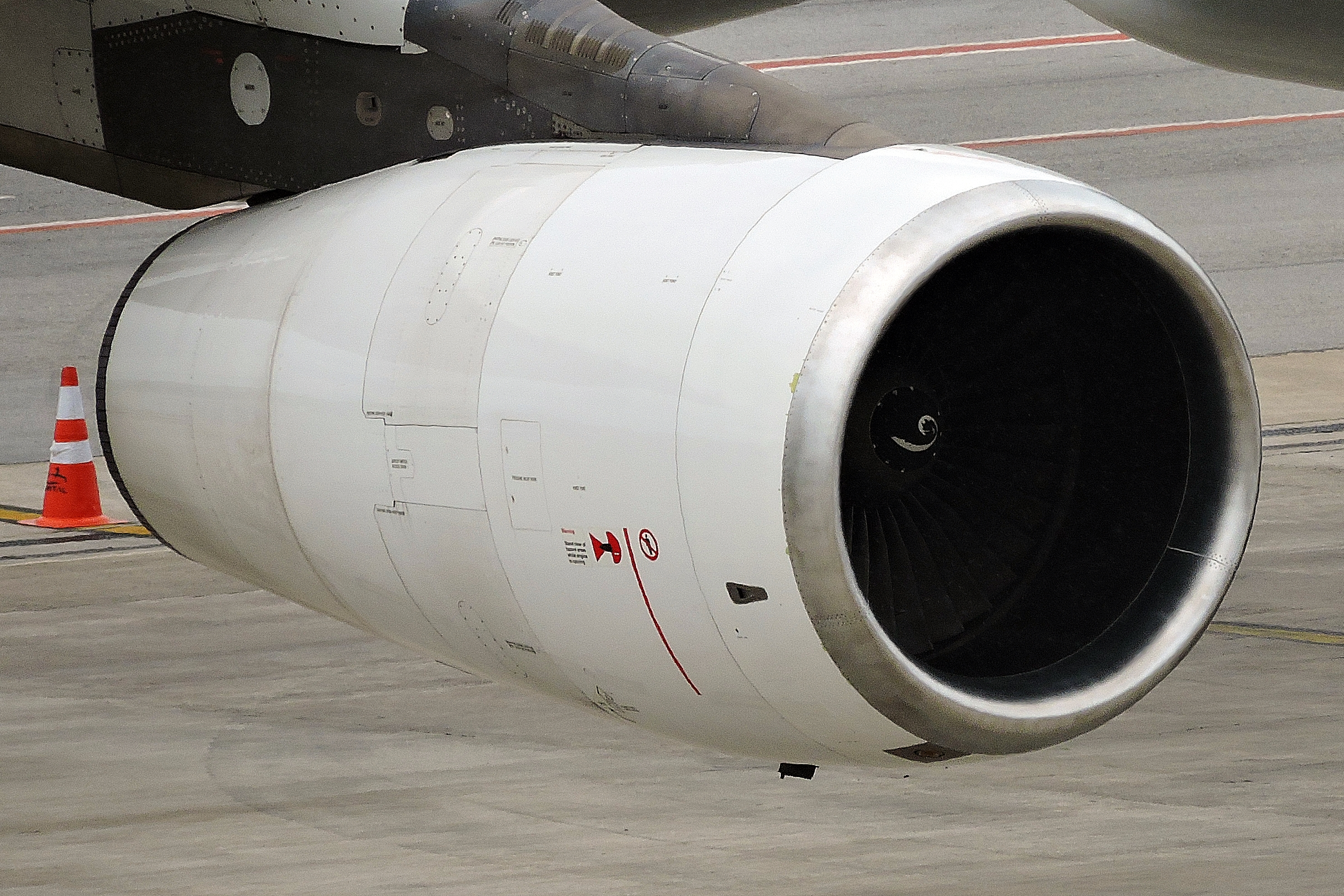
An CFM56-5C on an A340

With a thrust rating of between 31,200 and 34,000 lbf (139 kN and 151 kN), the CFM56-5C series is the most powerful of the CFM56 family. It powers Airbus' long-range A340-200 and -300 airliners, and entered service in 1993. The major changes are a larger fan, a fifth low-pressure turbine stage, and the same four-stage low-pressure compressor found in the -5B variant.

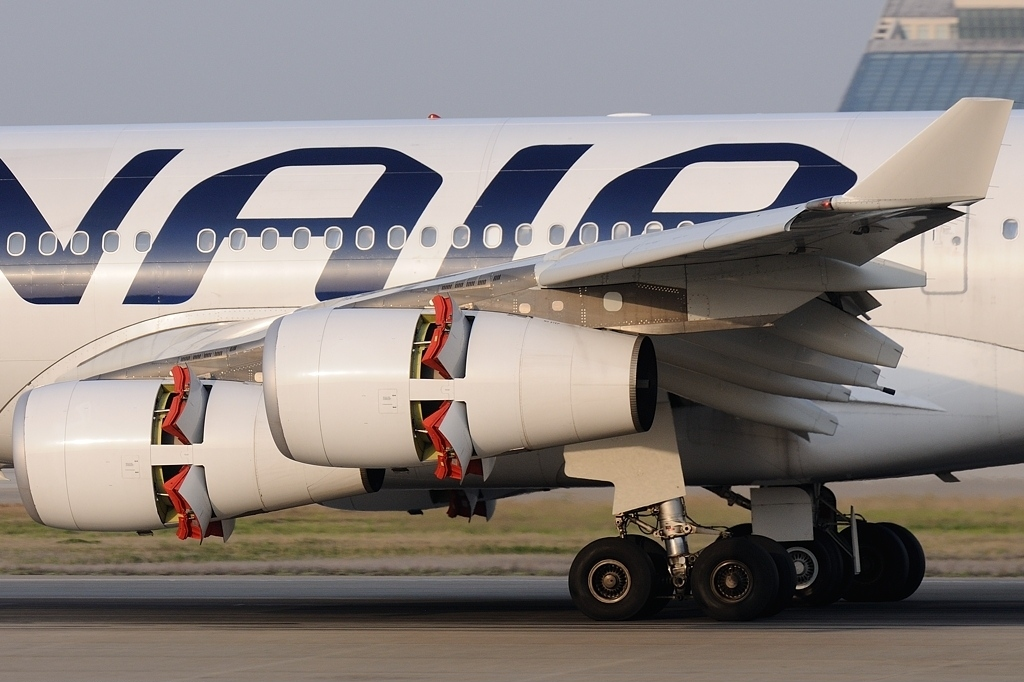
CFM56-5C on an A340-300 with pivoting-door thrust reversers during landing

Unlike every other variant of the CFM56, the -5C features a mixed-exhaust nozzle, which offers slightly higher efficiency.

Model	Thrust	BPR	OPR	Dry weight	Applications
CFM56-5C2	31,200 lbf (139 kN)	6.6	37.4	8,796 lb (3,990 kg)	Airbus A340-211/-311
CFM56-5C3	32,500 lbf (145 kN)	6.5	37.4	8,796 lb (3,990 kg)	Airbus A340-212/-312
CFM56-5C4	34,000 lbf (151 kN)	6.4	38.3	8,796 lb (3,990 kg)	Airbus A340-213/-313

=== CFM56-7 series ===
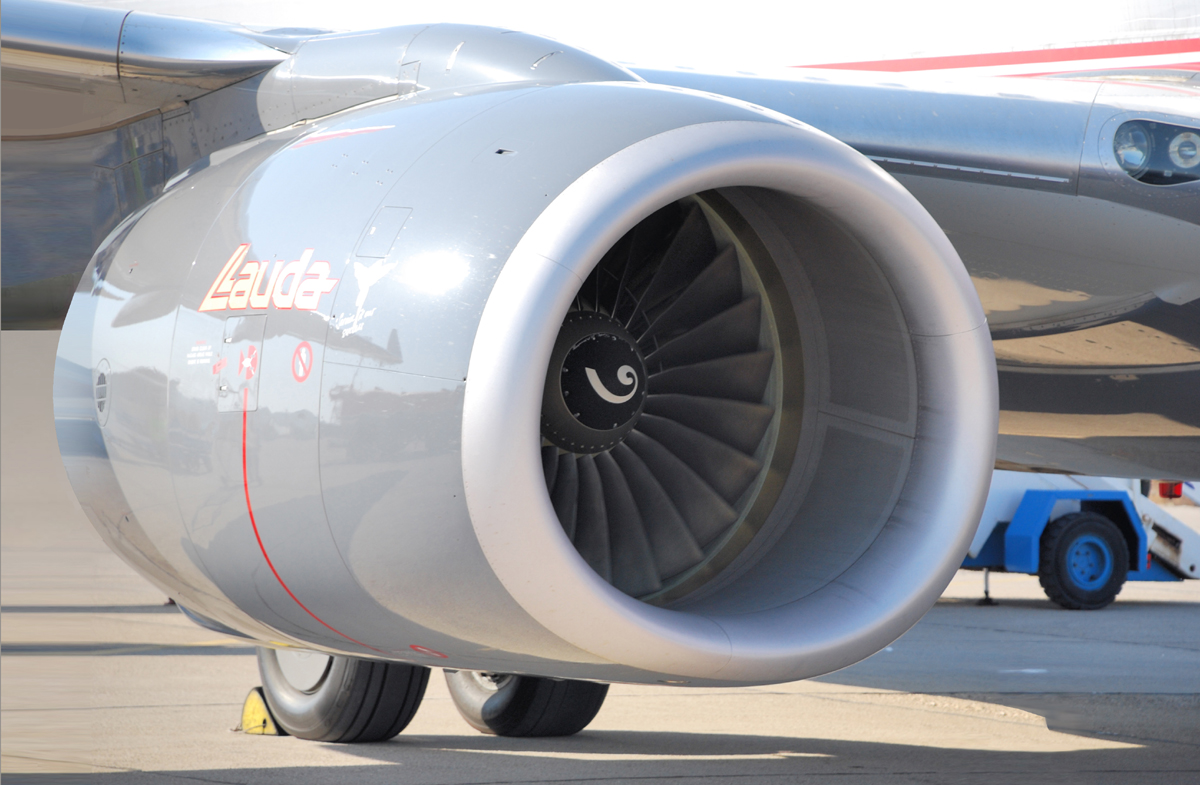
CFM56-7 of a Boeing 737-800

The CFM56-7 first ran on 21 April 1995. Rated with a takeoff thrust range of 19,500–27,300 lbf (87–121 kN), it powers the -600/-700/-800/-900 Boeing 737 Next Generation; compared to the CFM56-3, it has greater durability, 8% fuel burn improvement and a 15% reduction in maintenance costs.

Improvements are due to its 61-inch titanium wide chord fan, 3D aerodynamics designed new core and low-pressure turbine with single crystal high-pressure turbine and Full Authority Digital Engine Control (FADEC). Fan blades are reduced from 36 (CFM56-5) to 24 and it incorporates features from the CFM56-5B such as a double-annular combustor as an option.

Less than two years after entry into service, the Next-Generation 737 received 180 minutes Extended range twin engine Operations (ETOPS) certification from the US Federal Aviation Administration (FAA). It also powers the Boeing 737 military versions : Airborne Early Warning & Control, C-40 Clipper transport and P-8 Poseidon Maritime Aircraft.

After the Southwest Airlines Flight 1380 accident, the FAA required Boeing to redesign the nacelle and inlet of the 7B variant in compliance with applicable Part 25 regulations. The proposed rule is to receive comments until January 26, 2024. The rule will require airlines to make the relevant modifications by July 31, 2028.

CFM56-7B specifications
Model	Thrust	BPR	OPR	Dry weight	Applications
CFM56-7B18	19,500 lbf (86.7 kN)	5.5	32.7	5,216 lb (2,370 kg)	Boeing 737-600
CFM56-7B20	20,600 lbf (91.6 kN)	5.4	32.7	5,216 lb (2,370 kg)	Boeing 737-600, Boeing 737-700
CFM56-7B22	22,700 lbf (101 kN)	5.3	32.7	5,216 lb (2,370 kg)	Boeing 737-600, Boeing 737-700
CFM56-7B24	24,200 lbf (108 kN)	5.3	32.7	5,216 lb (2,370 kg)	Boeing 737-700, Boeing 737-800, Boeing 737-900
CFM56-7B26	26,300 lbf (117 kN)	5.1	32.7	5,216 lb (2,370 kg)	Boeing 737-700, Boeing 737-800, Boeing 737-900, BBJ
CFM56-7B27	27,300 lbf (121 kN)	5.1	32.7	5,216 lb (2,370 kg)	Boeing 737-800, Boeing 737-900, BBJ/BBJ2, AEW&C, MMA

== Reliability ==
The CFM56 has an in-flight shutdown rate of 1 incident per 333,333 hours. Record time on wing before the first shop visit was 30,000 hours in 1996, to 40,729 hours in 2003 and 50,000 hours in 2016.

There have been several engine failures in the early service of the CFM56 family which were serious enough to either ground the fleet or require aspects of the engine to be redesigned. The engines have also suffered, periodically, from thrust instability events tentatively traced to Honeywell's hydromechanical unit.

=== Rain and hail ingestion ===
There are several recorded incidents of CFM56 engines flaming out in heavy rain and/or hail conditions, beginning early in the CFM56's career. In 1987, a double flameout occurred in hail conditions (the pilots managed to relight the engines), followed by the TACA Flight 110 incident in 1988. Both CFM56 engines on the TACA 737 flamed out while passing through hail and heavy rain, and the crew was forced to land without engines on a grassy levee near New Orleans, Louisiana. CFMI modified the engines by adding a sensor to force the combustor to continuously ignite under these conditions.

In 2002, Garuda Indonesia Flight 421 had to ditch in a river because of hail-induced engine flameouts, killing a flight attendant and injuring dozens of passengers. Prior to this accident, there were several other incidents of single or dual flameouts due to these weather conditions. After three incidents through 1998, CFMI made modifications to the engine to improve the way in which the engine handled hail ingestion. The major changes included a modification to the fan/booster splitter (making it more difficult for hail to be ingested by the core of the engine) and the use of an elliptical, rather than conical, spinner at the intake. These changes did not prevent the 2002 accident, and the investigation board found that the pilots did not follow the proper procedures for attempting to restart the engine, which contributed to the final result. Recommendations were made to better educate pilots on how to handle these conditions, as well as to revisit FAA rain and hail testing procedures. No further engine modifications were recommended.

=== Fan blade failure ===
One issue that led to accidents with the CFM56-3C engine was the failure of fan blades. This mode of failure led to the Kegworth air disaster in 1989, which killed 47 people and injured 74 more. After the fan blade failed, the pilots mistakenly shut down the wrong engine, resulting in the damaged engine failing completely when powered up for the final approach. Following the Kegworth accident, CFM56 engines fitted to a Dan-Air 737-400 and a British Midland 737-400 suffered fan blade failures under similar conditions; neither incident resulted in a crash or injuries. After the second incident, the 737-400 fleet was grounded.

At the time it was not mandatory to flight test new variants of existing engines, and certification testing failed to reveal vibration modes that the fan experienced during the regularly performed power climbs at high altitude. Analysis revealed that the fan was being subjected to high-cycle fatigue stresses worse than expected and also more severe than tested for certification; these higher stresses caused the blade to fracture. Less than a month after grounding, the fleet was allowed to resume operations once the fan blades and fan disc were replaced and the electronic engine controls were modified to reduce maximum engine thrust to 22,000 lbf (98 kN) from 23,500 lbf (105 kN). The redesigned fan blades were installed on all CFM56-3C1 and CFM56-3B2 engines, including over 1,800 engines that had already been delivered to customers.

In August 2016 Southwest Airlines Flight 3472 suffered a fan blade failure, but landed later without further incident. While the aircraft sustained substantial damage, there were no injuries.

On 17 April 2018, Southwest Airlines Flight 1380 suffered from what appears to be a fan blade failure, debris from which punctured a window. The Boeing 737-700 landed safely, but one passenger was killed and several were injured.

On 10 July 2026, a Ryanair Boeing 737-800 operating flight FR1879 from Thessaloniki, Greece, to Memmingen, Germany, suffered from what appeared to be a fan blade failure, debris from which punctured a window and caused a passenger to be partly sucked out. The aircraft landed normally in Thessaloniki.

=== Fuel flow problems ===
Airlines have reported 32 events involving sudden instability of thrust, at various points during flight, including high thrust settings during climb to altitude. The problem has been long-standing. In 1998, two 737 pilots reported that their engine throttles suddenly increased to full thrust during flight. A very recent investigation has led to the tentative conclusion that the problem originates in the Hydromechanical unit, and may involve an unacceptable level of fuel contamination (with water, or particulate matter, including biodegradable material that create solids in the fuel), or overuse of biocides to reduce bacterial growth. Boeing told Aviation Week and Space Technology that CFM International had revised its FADEC software. The new software "...'reduces the duration and degree of thrust-instability events' by cycling the fuel monitoring valve (FMV) and the EHSV (electrohydraulic servo valve) to clean the EHSV spool." This software fix is not intended to be a definitive solution to the problem; CFM claimed that no further reports have reached it after this change was made.

=== Parts of unknown origin ===
In 2023, Bloomberg reported that European aviation regulators had determined that London-based AOG Technics, majority owned by Jose Alejandro Zamora Yrala, whose nationality is listed as British on some forms and Venezuelan on others, supplied parts of unknown origin and false documents for repairs on some CFM56s.

== Applications ==
- Airbus A320 family
  - Airbus A318
- Airbus A340
- Boeing 707-700 (prototype only)
- Boeing 737 Classic
- Boeing 737 Next Generation
  - Boeing E-7 Wedgetail
  - Boeing C-40 Clipper
  - Boeing P-8 Poseidon
- Boeing Business Jet
- Boeing E-3D Sentry
- Boeing E-6 Mercury
- Boeing KC-135R Stratotanker
  - Boeing RC-135
  - Boeing WC-135
- McDonnell Douglas DC-8 Super 70 (series -71, -72, -73)

== Specifications ==
Variant	-2	-3	-5	-5B	-5C	-7B
Type	Dual rotor, axial flow, high bypass ratio turbofan					
Compressor	1 fan, 3 LP, 9 HP			1 fan, 4 LP, 9 HP		1 fan, 3 LP, 9 HP
Combustor	Annular (double annular for -5B/2 and -7B/2 "DAC")					
Turbine	1 HP, 4 LP				1 HP, 5 LP	1 HP, 4 LP
Control	Hydro-mechanical + limited electronic		Dual FADEC			
Length	243 cm (96 in)	236.4 cm (93.1 in)	242.2 cm (95.4 in)	259.97 cm (102.35 in)	262.2 cm (103.2 in)	250.8 cm (98.7 in)
Width	183–200 cm (72–79 in)	201.8 cm (79.4 in)	190.8 cm (75.1 in)	190.8 cm (75.1 in)	194.6 cm (76.6 in)	211.8 cm (83.4 in)
Height	214–216 cm (84–85 in)	181.7 cm (71.5 in)	210.1 cm (82.7 in)	210.5 cm (82.9 in)	225 cm (89 in)	182.9 cm (72.0 in)
Dry weight	2,139–2,200 kg 4,716–4,850 lb	1,954–1,966 kg 4,308–4,334 lb	2,331 kg 5,139 lb	2,454.8–2,500.6 kg 5,412–5,513 lb	2,644.4 kg 5,830 lb	2,386–2,431 kg 5,260–5,359 lb
Takeoff thrust	95.99–106.76 kN; 21,580–24,000 lbf	89.41–104.6 kN; 20,100–23,520 lbf	97.86–117.87 kN; 22,000–26,500 lbf	133.45–142.34 kN; 30,000–32,000 lbf	138.78–151.24 kN; 31,200–34,000 lbf	91.63–121.43 kN; 20,600–27,300 lbf
Thrust/weight	4.49–4.9	4.49–5.22	4.2–5.06	5.44–5.69	5.25–5.72	3.84–5
100% RPM	LP 5176, HP 14460	LP 5179, HP 14460	LP 5000, HP 14460	LP 5000, HP 14460	LP 4784, HP 14460	LP 5175, HP 14460
Variant	-2	-3	-5	-5B	-5C	-7B
Air flow/sec at sea level	784–817 lb 356–371 kg	638–710 lb 289–322 kg	816–876 lb 370–397 kg	811–968 lb 368–439 kg	1,027–1,065 lb 466–483 kg	677–782 lb 307–355 kg
Bypass ratio	5.9–6.0		6.0–6.2	5.4–6.0	6.4–6.5	5.1–5.5
Max OPR	30.5–31.8	27.5–30.6	31.3	32.6–35.5	37.4–38.3	32.8
Fan diameter	68.3 in (173 cm)	60 in (152 cm)	68.3 in (173 cm)		72.3 in (184 cm)	61 in (155 cm)
Application	Boeing KC-135; Boeing 707; Douglas DC-8-70	Boeing 737 Classic	Airbus A319; Airbus A320	Airbus A320 family	Airbus A340-200/300	Boeing 737 Next Generation
Takeoff TSFC	0.366–0.376 lb/(lbf⋅h); 10.4–10.7 g/(kN⋅s)	0.386–0.396 lb/(lbf⋅h); 10.9–11.2 g/(kN⋅s)	0.3316 lb/(lbf⋅h); 9.39 g/(kN⋅s)	0.3266–0.3536 lb/(lbf⋅h); 9.25–10.02 g/(kN⋅s)	0.326–0.336 lb/(lbf⋅h); 9.2–9.5 g/(kN⋅s)	0.356–0.386 lb/(lbf⋅h); 10.1–10.9 g/(kN⋅s)
Cruise TSFC	0.65 lb/(lbf⋅h); 18 g/(kN⋅s) (-2B1)	0.667 lb/(lbf⋅h); 18.9 g/(kN⋅s) (-3C1)	0.596 lb/(lbf⋅h); 16.9 g/(kN⋅s) (-5A1)	0.545 lb/(lbf⋅h); 15.4 g/(kN⋅s) (-5B4)	0.545 lb/(lbf⋅h); 15.4 g/(kN⋅s) (-5C2)	

== See also ==
Related development

- CFM International LEAP
- General Electric F101
- General Electric Affinity
- PowerJet SaM146

Comparable engines

- IAE V2500
- Pratt & Whitney PW6000

Related lists

- List of aircraft engines
