= Niederalteich =

- Municipality
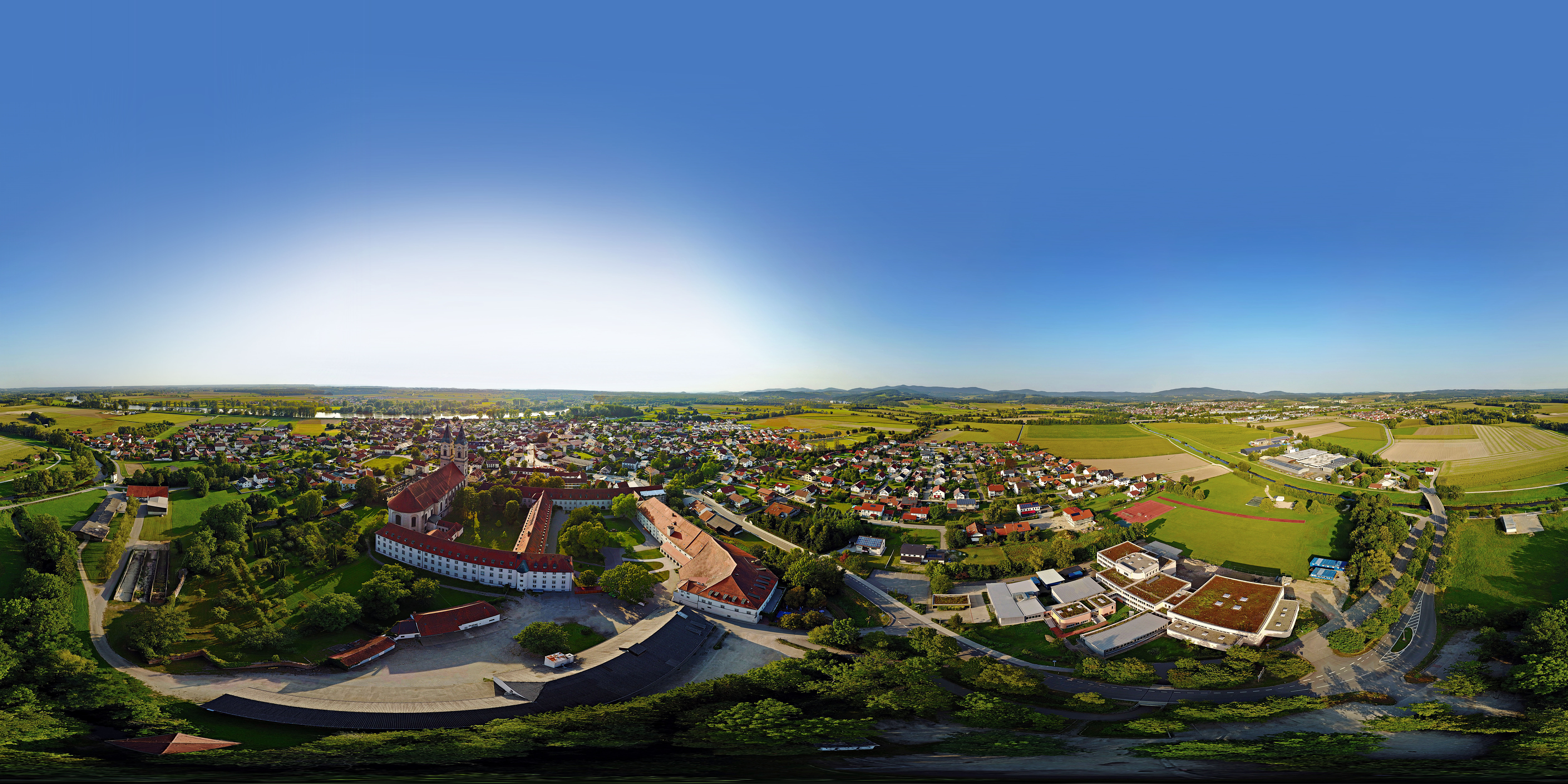
- Panorama of Niederalteich

- Coat of arms

- Location of Niederalteich within Deggendorf district
- Interactive map of Niederalteich
- Location within Germany Location within Bavaria
- Coordinates: 48°46′N 13°01′E
- Country: Germany
- State: Bavaria
- Admin. region: Niederbayern
- District: Deggendorf

Government
  - Mayor (2020–26): Albin Dietrich

Area
  - Total: 9.96 km^{2} (3.85 sq mi)
- Elevation: 312 m (1,024 ft)

Population (2025-12-31)
  - Total: 1,748
  - Density: 176/km^{2} (455/sq mi)
- Time zone: UTC+01:00 (CET)
  - Summer (DST): UTC+02:00 (CEST)
- Postal codes: 94557
- Dialling codes: 09901
- Vehicle registration: DEG
- Website: www.niederalteich.de

Niederalteich (Central Bavarian: Niedaoida) is a village on the Danube in Bavaria, Germany. It is best known as the location of Niederaltaich Abbey.
