= Eurofighter Typhoon =

1994 multi-role combat aircraft family by Eurofighter

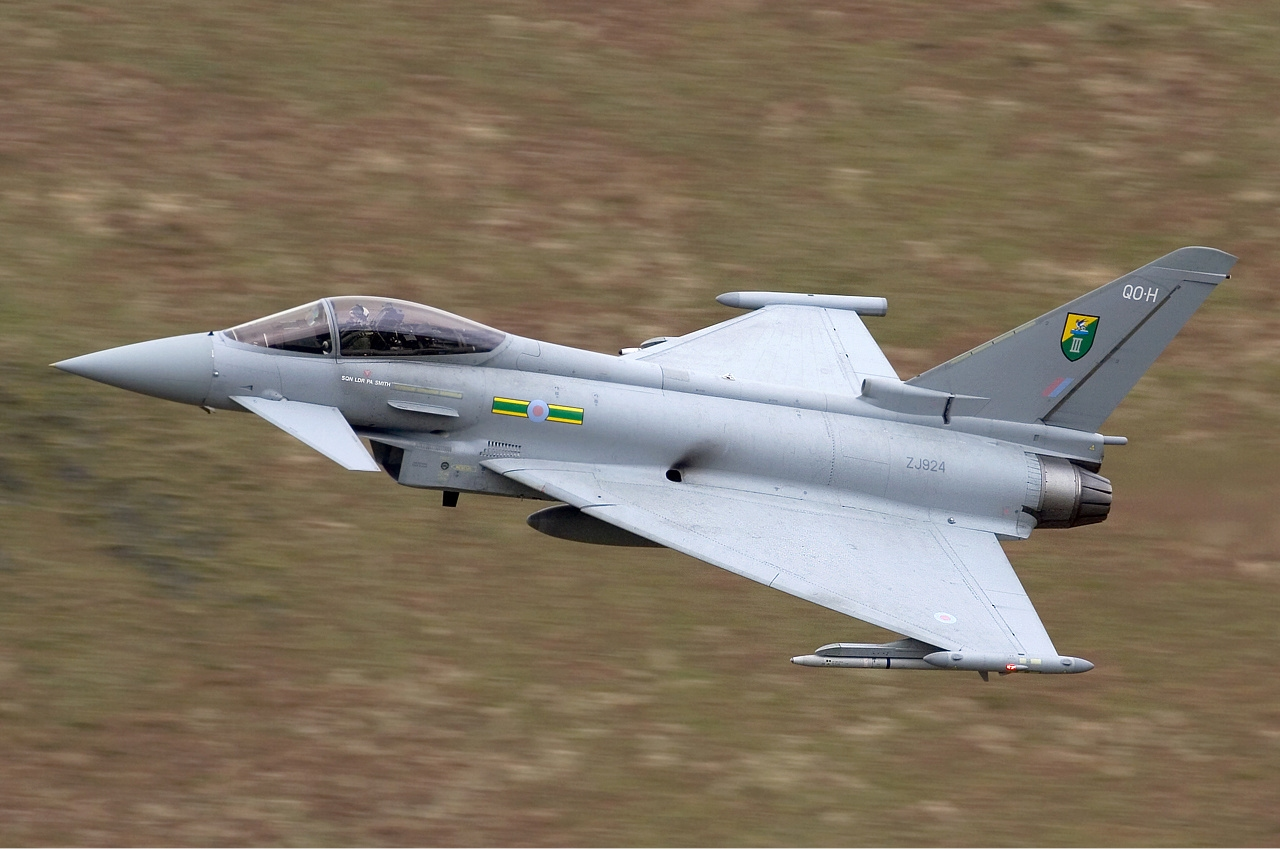
- Royal Air Force Typhoon F2 flying through the Mach Loop in Snowdonia National Park, Wales.

General information
- Type: Air superiority fighter with multirole capabilities
- National origin: Multinational
- Manufacturer: Eurofighter GmbH
- Status: In service
- Primary users: Royal Air Force German Air Force; Italian Air Force; Spanish Air and Space Force; See Operators below for others
- Number built: 611 + 7 prototypes as of June 2026

History
- Manufactured: 1994–present
- Introduction date: 4 August 2003
- First flight: 27 March 1994
- Developed from: British Aerospace EAP

The Eurofighter Typhoon is a European multinational twin-engine, supersonic, canard delta wing, multirole fighter. The Typhoon was designed originally as an air-superiority fighter and is manufactured by a consortium of Airbus, BAE Systems and Leonardo that conducts the majority of the project through a joint holding company, Eurofighter Jagdflugzeug GmbH. The NATO Eurofighter and Tornado Management Agency, representing the UK, Germany, Italy and Spain, manages the project and is the prime customer.

The aircraft's development began in 1983 with the Future European Fighter Aircraft programme, a multinational collaboration among the UK, Germany, France, Italy and Spain. Previously, Germany, Italy and the UK had jointly developed and deployed the Panavia Tornado combat aircraft and desired to collaborate on a new project with additional participating EU nations. However, disagreements over design authority and operational requirements led France to leave the consortium to develop the Dassault Rafale independently. A technology demonstration aircraft, the British Aerospace EAP, first flew on 6 August 1986; a Eurofighter prototype made its maiden flight on 27 March 1994. The aircraft's name, Typhoon, was adopted in September 1998 and the first production contracts were also signed that year.

The sudden end of the Cold War reduced European demand for fighter aircraft which led to debate over the aircraft's cost, division of work between the partner nations, and protracted development. The Typhoon entered operational service in 2003 and is now in service with the air forces of Austria, Italy, Germany, the United Kingdom, Spain, Saudi Arabia, Oman, Kuwait, and Qatar. Turkey has also ordered the aircraft, bringing the procurement total to 769 aircraft as of 30 June 2026.

The Eurofighter Typhoon is a highly agile aircraft, designed to be an effective dogfighter in combat. Later production aircraft have been increasingly better equipped to undertake air-to-surface strike missions and to be compatible with an increasing number of different armaments and equipment, including Storm Shadow, Brimstone and Marte ER missiles. The Typhoon had its combat debut during the 2011 military intervention in Libya with the UK's Royal Air Force (RAF) and the Italian Air Force, performing aerial reconnaissance and ground strike missions. The type has also taken primary responsibility for air defence duties for the majority of customer nations.

== Development ==
=== Origins ===
In the UK, as early as 1971, work commenced on the development of a maneuverable, tactical aircraft to replace the SEPECAT Jaguar (that was then about to enter service with the RAF). This work soon expanded to include an air superiority capability. A specification titled Air Staff Target 403 (AST 403), in 1972, led to the Hawker P.96, an unbuilt design with a relatively conventional planform, including a separate tail structure, in the late 1970s.

Simultaneously, in West Germany, the requirement for a new fighter had resulted in competition between Dornier, VFW-Fokker and Messerschmitt-Bölkow-Blohm (MBB) for a future Luftwaffe contract known as Taktisches Kampfflugzeug 90 ("Tactical Combat Aircraft 90"; TKF-90). Dornier collaborated with Northrop in the US on an acclaimed but unsuccessful design known as the Northrop-Dornier ND-102. MBB was successful, with a design including a cranked delta wing, close-coupled-canard controls, and artificial stability.

In 1979, MBB and British Aerospace (BAe) presented a formal proposal to their respective governments for a collaboration, to be known as the European Collaborative Fighter, or European Combat Fighter (ECF). In October 1979, French firm Dassault joined the ECF project. It was at this stage of development the Eurofighter name was first attached to the aircraft. However, the development of three separate prototypes continued: MBB continued to refine its TKF-90 concept, and Dassault produced a design known as the ACX.

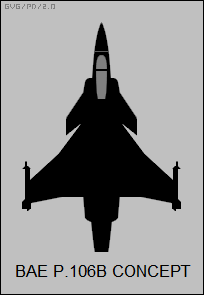
BAe P.106B

In the meantime, while the P.96 would have met the original UK specification, it had been cancelled because it was considered to offer little potential for future upgrades and redevelopment. In addition, there was a feeling within the UK aircraft industry that the P.96 would have been too similar to the McDonnell Douglas F/A-18 Hornet, which was then known to be at an advanced stage of development. The P.96 would not have been available until long after the Hornet, which would therefore likely have met and closed off most potential export markets for the P.96. BAe then produced two new proposals: the P.106B, (Note: The P.106A was a single-engine version of the original P.96.) a single-engined lightweight fighter, superficially resembling the future Saab JAS 39 Gripen and the twin-engine P.110. The RAF rejected the P.106 concept on the grounds it had "half the effectiveness of the two-engined aircraft at two-thirds of the cost."

The ECF project collapsed in 1981 for several reasons, including differing requirements, Dassault's insistence on "design leadership", and the British preference for a new version of the RB199 to power the aircraft versus the French preference for the new Snecma M88.

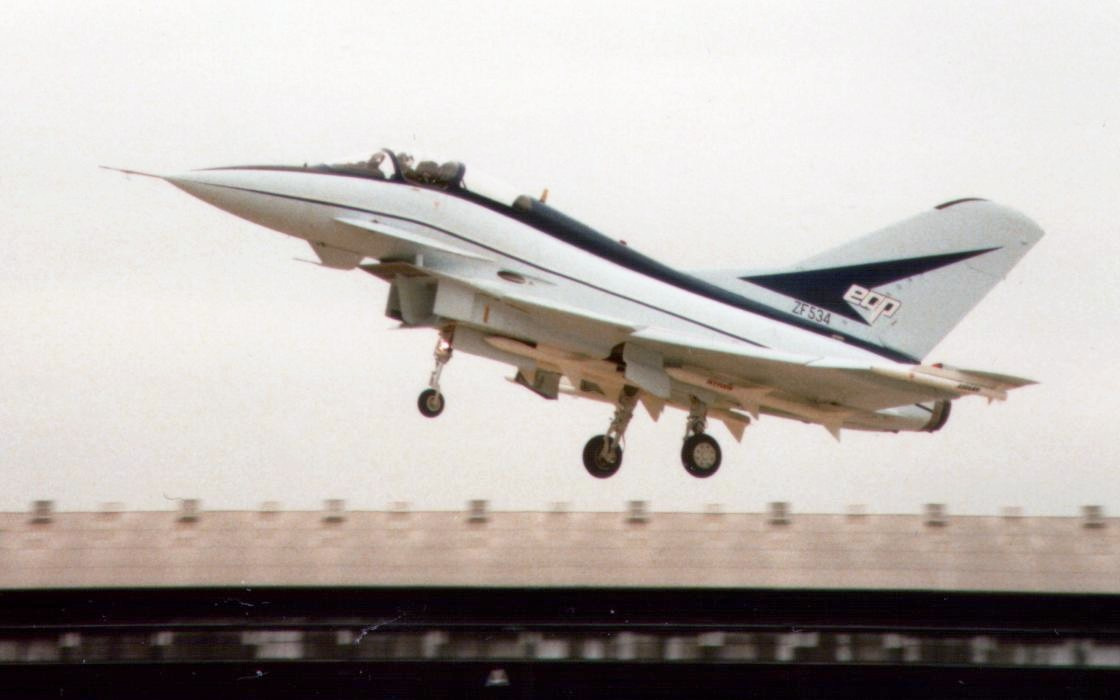
British Aerospace EAP ZF534 (for "Experimental Aircraft Programme") at the Farnborough Air Show, 1986

Consequently, the Panavia partners (MBB, BAe and Aeritalia) launched the Agile Combat Aircraft (ACA) programme in April 1982. BAe designers agreed with the overall configuration of the proposed MBB TKF-90, although they rejected some of its more ambitious features such as engine vectoring nozzles and vented trailing edge controls—a form of boundary layer control. The ACA, like the BAe P.110, had a cranked delta wing, canards, and a twin tail. One major external difference was the replacement of the side-mounted engine intakes with a chin intake. The ACA was to be powered by a modified version of the RB199. The German and Italian governments withdrew funding, and the UK Ministry of Defence (MoD) agreed to fund 50% of the cost with the remaining 50% to be provided by industry. MBB and Aeritalia signed up and it was agreed that the aircraft would be produced at two sites: BAe Warton and an MBB factory in Germany. In May 1983, BAe announced a contract with the MoD for the development and production of an ACA demonstrator, the Experimental Aircraft Programme.

In 1983, Italy, Germany, France, the UK and Spain launched the "Future European Fighter Aircraft" (FEFA) programme. The aircraft was to have short take off and landing (STOL) and beyond visual range (BVR) capabilities. In 1984, France reiterated its requirement for a carrier-capable version and demanded a leading role. Italy, West Germany, and the UK opted out and established a new EFA programme. In Turin on 2 August 1985, West Germany, the UK, and Italy agreed to go ahead with the Eurofighter and confirmed France and Spain had chosen not to proceed as a member of the project. Despite pressure from France, Spain rejoined the Eurofighter project in early September 1985. France officially withdrew from the project to pursue its own ACX project, which was to become the Dassault Rafale.

By 1986, the programme's cost had reached £180 million. When the EAP programme had started, the cost was supposed to be equally shared by government and industry, but the West German and Italian governments wavered on the agreement, and the British government and private finance had to provide £100 million to keep the programme from ending. In April 1986, the British Aerospace EAP was rolled out at BAe Warton. The EAP first flew on 6 August 1986. The Eurofighter bears a strong resemblance to the EAP. Design work continued over the next five years using data from the EAP. Initial requirements were: UK: 250 aircraft, Germany: 250, Italy: 165 and Spain: 100. The share of the production work was divided among the countries in proportion to their projected procurement – BAe (33%), DASA (33%), Aeritalia (21%), and Construcciones Aeronáuticas SA (CASA) (13%).

The Munich-based Eurofighter Jagdflugzeug GmbH was established in 1986 to manage development of the project and EuroJet Turbo GmbH, the alliance of Rolls-Royce, MTU Aero Engines, FiatAvio (now Avio) and ITP for development of the EJ200. The aircraft was known as Eurofighter EFA from the late 1980s until it was renamed EF 2000 in 1992.

By 1990, the selection of the aircraft's radar had become a major obstacle. The UK, Italy and Spain supported the Ferranti Defence Systems-led ECR-90, while Germany preferred the APG-65-based MSD2000 (a collaboration between Hughes, AEG and GEC-Marconi). An agreement was reached after UK Defence Secretary Tom King assured his West German counterpart Gerhard Stoltenberg that the British government would approve the project and allow the GEC subsidiary Marconi Electronic Systems to acquire Ferranti Defence Systems from its parent, the Ferranti Group, which was in financial and legal difficulties. GEC thus withdrew its support for the MSD2000.

=== Delays ===
The financial burdens placed on Germany by reunification caused Helmut Kohl to make an election promise to cancel the Eurofighter. In early to mid 1991, German Defence Minister Volker Rühe sought to withdraw Germany from the project in favour of using Eurofighter technology in a cheaper, lighter plane. Because of the amount of money already spent on development, the number of jobs dependent on the project, and the binding commitments on each partner government, Kohl was unable to withdraw; "Rühe's predecessors had locked themselves into the project by a punitive penalty system of their own devising."

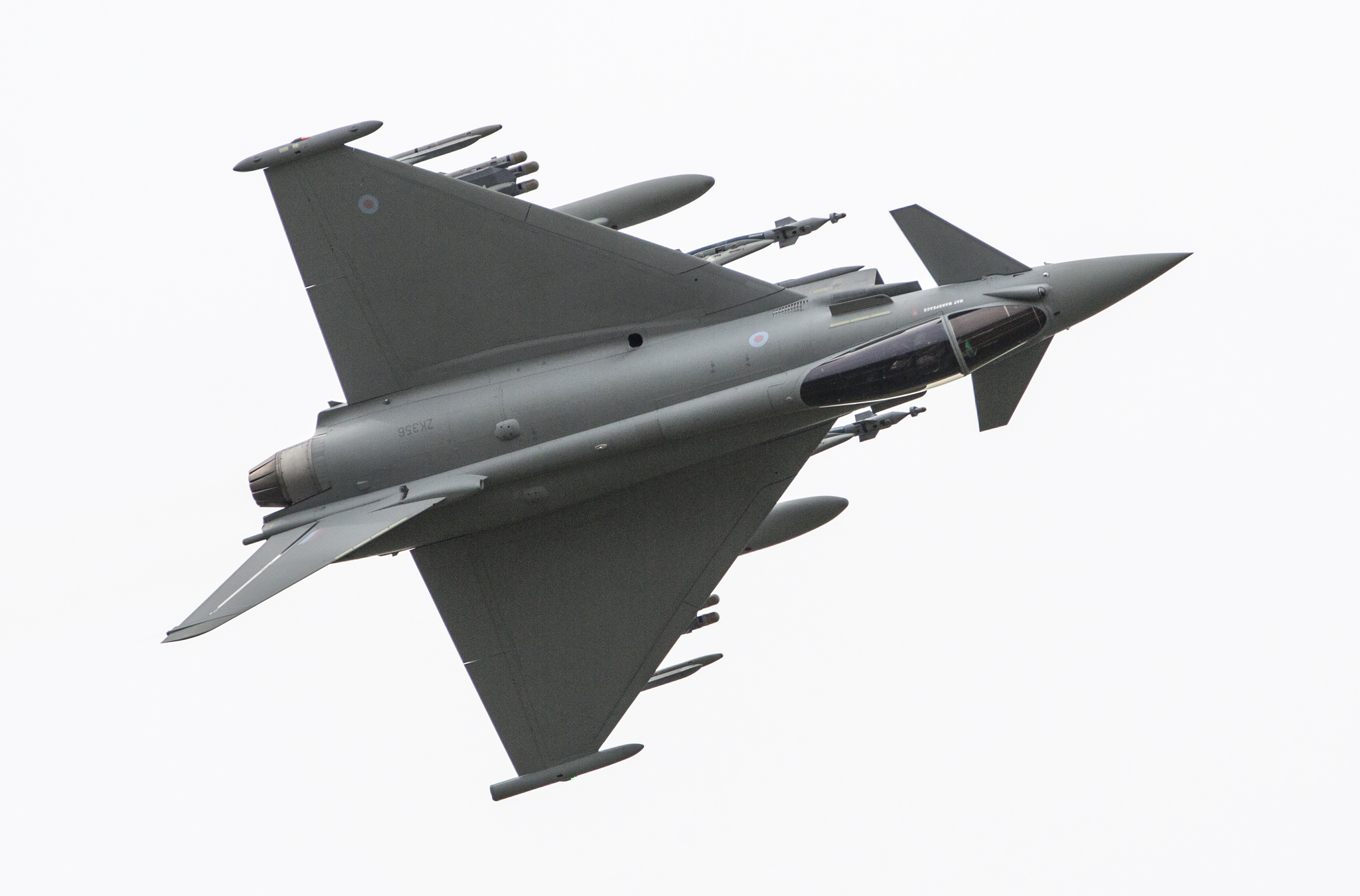
RAF Typhoon FGR4 ZK356 shows its delta wing, July 2016.

In 1995, concerns over workshare appeared. Since the formation of Eurofighter, the workshare split had been agreed at 33/33/21/13 (United Kingdom/Germany/Italy/Spain) based on the number of units being ordered by each contributing nation. All the nations then reduced their orders; the UK cut its orders from 250 to 232, Germany from 250 to 140, Italy from 165 to 121, and Spain from 100 to 87. According to these order levels, the workshare split should have been 39/24/22/15 UK/Germany/Italy/Spain; however, Germany was unwilling to give up such a large amount of work. In January 1996, after much negotiation between German and UK partners, a compromise was reached whereby Germany would purchase another 40 aircraft. The workshare split was therefore UK 37.42%, Germany 29.03%, Italy 19.52% and Spain 14.03%.

At the 1996 Farnborough Airshow the UK announced funding for the construction phase of the project. On 22 December 1997 the defence ministers of the four partner nations signed the contract for production of the Eurofighter.

=== Testing ===
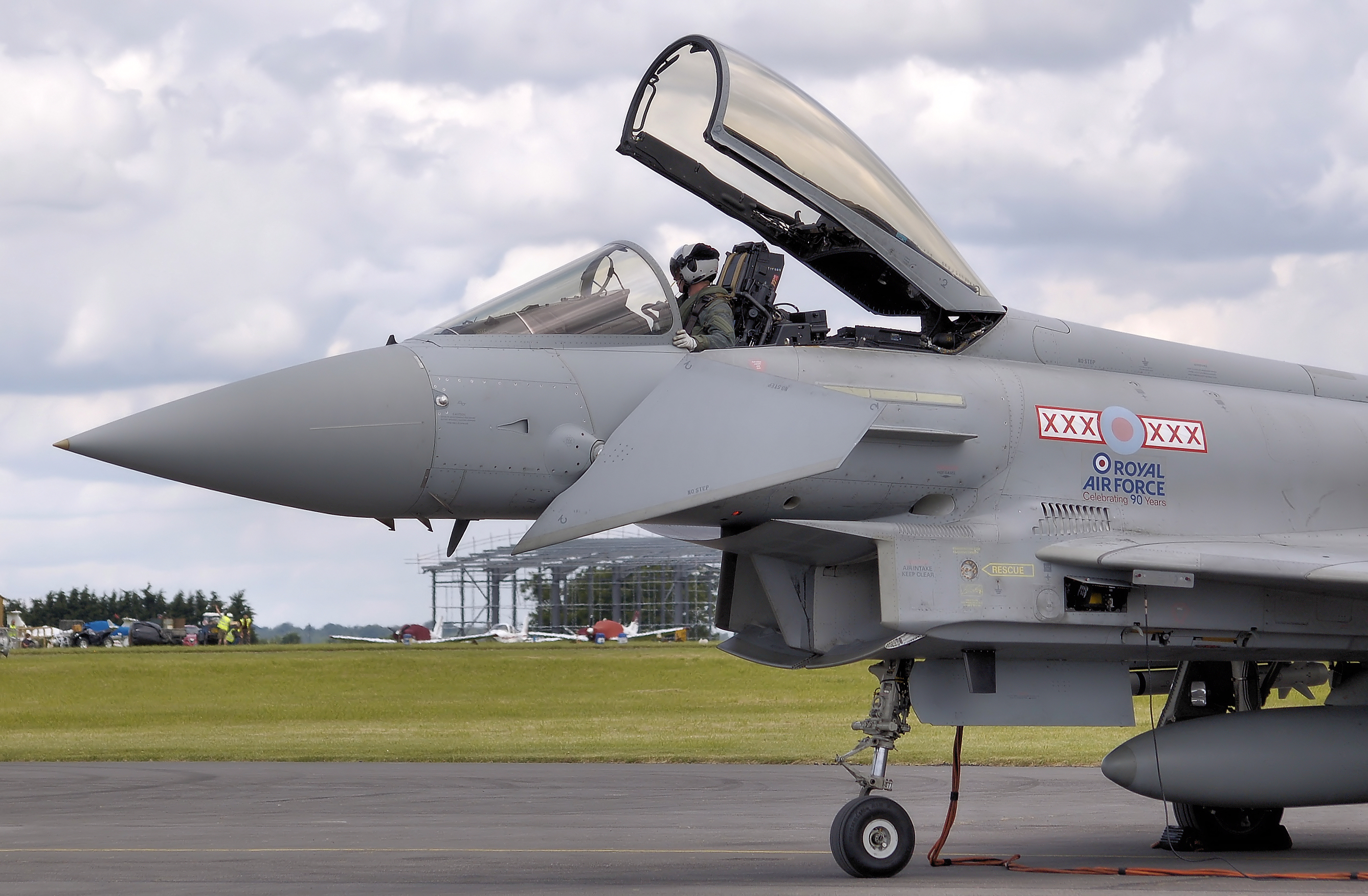
Close-up view of RAF Typhoon F2 ZJ910, showing the deflected canard control surface immediately below the pilot

The maiden flight of the Eurofighter prototype took place in Bavaria on 27 March 1994, flown by DASA chief test pilot Peter Weger. In December 2004, Eurofighter Typhoon IPA4 began three months of Cold Environmental Trials (CET) at the Vidsel Air Base in Sweden, the purpose of which was to verify the operational behaviour of the aircraft and its systems in temperatures between −25 and 31 °C. The maiden flight of Instrumented Production Aircraft 7 (IPA7), the first fully equipped Tranche 2 aircraft, took place from EADS' Manching airfield on 16 January 2008.

=== Procurement, production and costs ===
The first production contract was signed on 30 January 1998 between Eurofighter GmbH, Eurojet and NETMA. The procurement totals were as follows: the UK 232, Germany 180, Italy 121, and Spain 87. Production was again allotted according to procurement: BAe (37.42%), DASA (29.03%), Aeritalia (19.52%), and CASA (14.03%).

On 2 September 1998, a naming ceremony was held at Farnborough, United Kingdom. This saw the Typhoon name formally adopted, initially for export aircraft only. The name continues the storm theme started by the Panavia Tornado. Germany reportedly opposed this name; the Hawker Typhoon was a fighter-bomber aircraft used by the RAF during the Second World War to attack German targets. The name "Spitfire II" (after the famous British Second World War fighter, the Supermarine Spitfire) had also been considered and rejected for the same reason early in the development programme. In September 1998, contracts were signed for production of 148 Tranche 1 aircraft and procurement of long lead-time items for Tranche 2 aircraft. In March 2008, the final Tranche 1 aircraft was delivered to the German Air Force. On 21 October 2008, the RAF's first two of 91 Tranche 2 aircraft, were delivered to RAF Coningsby.

In July 2009, after almost 2 years of negotiations, the planned Tranche 3 purchase was split into 2 parts, and the Tranche 3A contract was signed by the partner nations. The "Tranche 3B" order did not go ahead.

The Eurofighter Typhoon is unique in modern combat aircraft in that there are four separate assembly lines. Each partner company assembles its own national aircraft, but builds the same parts for all aircraft (including exports); Premium AEROTEC (main centre fuselage), EADS CASA (right wing, leading edge slats), BAE Systems (BAE) (front fuselage (including foreplanes), canopy, dorsal spine, tail fin, inboard flaperons, rear fuselage section) and Leonardo (left wing, outboard flaperons, rear fuselage sections).

Production is divided into three tranches (see table below). Tranches are a production/funding distinction and do not imply an incremental increase in capability with each tranche. Tranche 3 are based on late Tranche 2 aircraft with improvements added. Tranche 3 was split into A and B parts. Tranches were further divided up into production standard/capability blocks and funding/procurement batches, though these did not coincide; for example, the Eurofighter designated FGR4 by the RAF is a Tranche 1, block 5. Batch 1 covered block 1, but batch 2 covered blocks 2, 2B and 5. On 25 May 2011, the 100th production aircraft, ZK315, rolled off the production line at Warton.

In 1985, the estimated cost of 250 UK aircraft was £7 billion. By 1997 the estimated cost was £17 billion; by 2003, £20 billion, and the in-service date (2003, defined as the date of delivery of the first aircraft to the RAF) was 54 months late. After 2003, the MoD refused to release updated cost estimates on the grounds of commercial sensitivity. However, in 2011, the National Audit Office estimated the UK's "assessment, development, production and upgrade costs eventually hit £22.9 billion" and total programme costs would reach £37 billion.

By 2007, the First Merkel cabinet (Germany) estimated the system cost (aircraft and training, plus spare parts), per year at €120 million, whereas the unit cost per Eurofighter was €57 million, and said it was in perpetual increase. On 17 June 2009, Germany ordered 31 aircraft of Tranche 3A for €2.8 billion, leading to a system cost of €90 million per aircraft. The UK's Committee of Public Accounts reported that mismanagement of the project had helped increase the cost of each aircraft by seventy-five per cent. The Spanish MoD put the cost of their Typhoon project up to December 2010 at €11.718 billion, up from an original €9.255 billion and implying a system cost for their 73 aircraft of €160 million.

On 31 March 2009, a Eurofighter Typhoon fired an AIM-120 AMRAAM whilst having its radar in passive mode for the first time; the necessary target data for the missile was acquired by the radar of a second Eurofighter Typhoon and transmitted using the Multifunctional Information Distribution System (MIDS). The entire Typhoon fleet passed the 500,000 flying hours milestone in 2018. As of August 2019, a total of 623 orders had been received.

In July 2016, the ten-year Typhoon Total Availability Enterprise (TyTAN) support deal between the RAF and industry partners BAE and Leonardo was announced that aimed to reduce the Typhoon's per-hour operating cost by 30 to 40 per cent. This would equate to a saving of at least £550 million ($712 million), which "will be recycled into the programme" and, according to BAE, would result in the Typhoon having a per-hour operating cost "equivalent to a F-16". By 2022, it was estimated that savings would be "over £500 million".

=== Upgrades ===
In 2000, the UK selected the Meteor from MBDA as the long range air-to-air missile armament for its Typhoons with an in-service date of December 2011. In December 2002, France, Germany, Spain and Sweden joined the British in a $1.9bn contract for Meteor on Typhoon, the Dassault Rafale, and the Saab Gripen. The protracted contract negotiations pushed the ISD to August 2012, and it was further put back by Eurofighter's failure to make trials aircraft available to the Meteor partners. In 2014 the "second element of the Phase 1 Enhancements package known as 'P1Eb'" was announced, allowing "Typhoon to realise both its air-to-air and air-to-ground capability to full effect".

In 2011 Flight International reported that budgetary pressures being encountered by the four original partner nations were limiting upgrades. For example, the four original partner nations were reluctant at that stage to fund enhancements that extend the aircraft's air-to-ground capability, such as integration of the MBDA Storm Shadow cruise missile.

Tranche 3 aircraft electronic countermeasures (ECM) enhancements have focused on improving radiating jamming power with antenna modifications, while EuroDASS is reported to offer a range of new capabilities, including the addition of a digital receiver, extending band coverage to low frequencies (VHF/UHF) and introducing an interferometric receiver with extremely precise geolocation functionalities. On the jamming side, EuroDASS is looking to low-band (VHF/UHF) jamming, more capable antennae, new ECM techniques, while protection against missiles is to be enhanced through a new passive missile warning system in addition to the active devices already on board the aircraft. The latest support for self-protection will, however, originate from the new active electronically scanned array (AESA) radar, which is to replace the Captor system, providing in a spiralled programme with passive, active and cyberwarfare RF capabilities. Selex ES has developed a self-contained expendable digital radio frequency memory (DRFM) jammer for fast jet aircraft known as BriteCloud which is being studied for integration on the Typhoon.

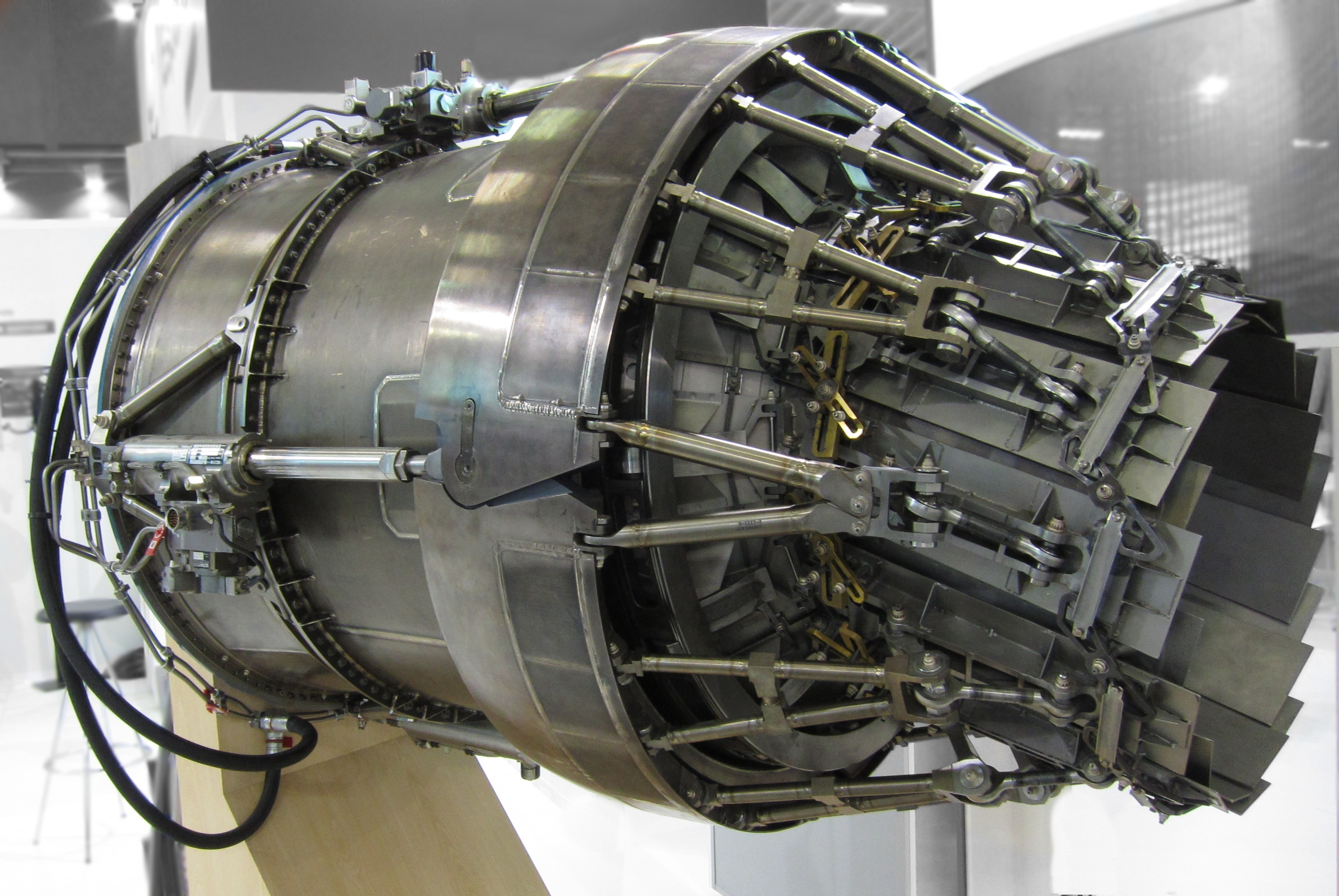
EJ200 TVC prototype

Eurojet is attempting to find funding to test thrust vectoring control (TVC) nozzles on a flight demonstrator. In April 2014, BAE announced new wind tunnel tests to assess the aerodynamic characteristics of conformal fuel tanks (CFTs). The CFTs, which can be fitted to any Tranche 3 aircraft, could carry 1,500 litres each to increase the Typhoon's combat radius by a factor of 25% to 1,500 nmi (2,778 km).

BAE has completed development of its Striker II Helmet-Mounted Display that builds on the capabilities of the original Striker Helmet-Mounted Display, which is already in service on the Typhoon. Striker II features a new display with more colour and can transition between day and night seamlessly, eliminating the need for separate night vision goggles. In addition, the helmet can monitor the pilot's exact head position so it always knows exactly what information to display. The system is compatible with ANR, a 3D audio threats system and 3D communications; these are available as customer options. In 2015, BAE was awarded a £1.7 million contract to study the feasibility of a common weapon launcher that could be capable of carrying multiple weapons and weapon types on a single pylon.

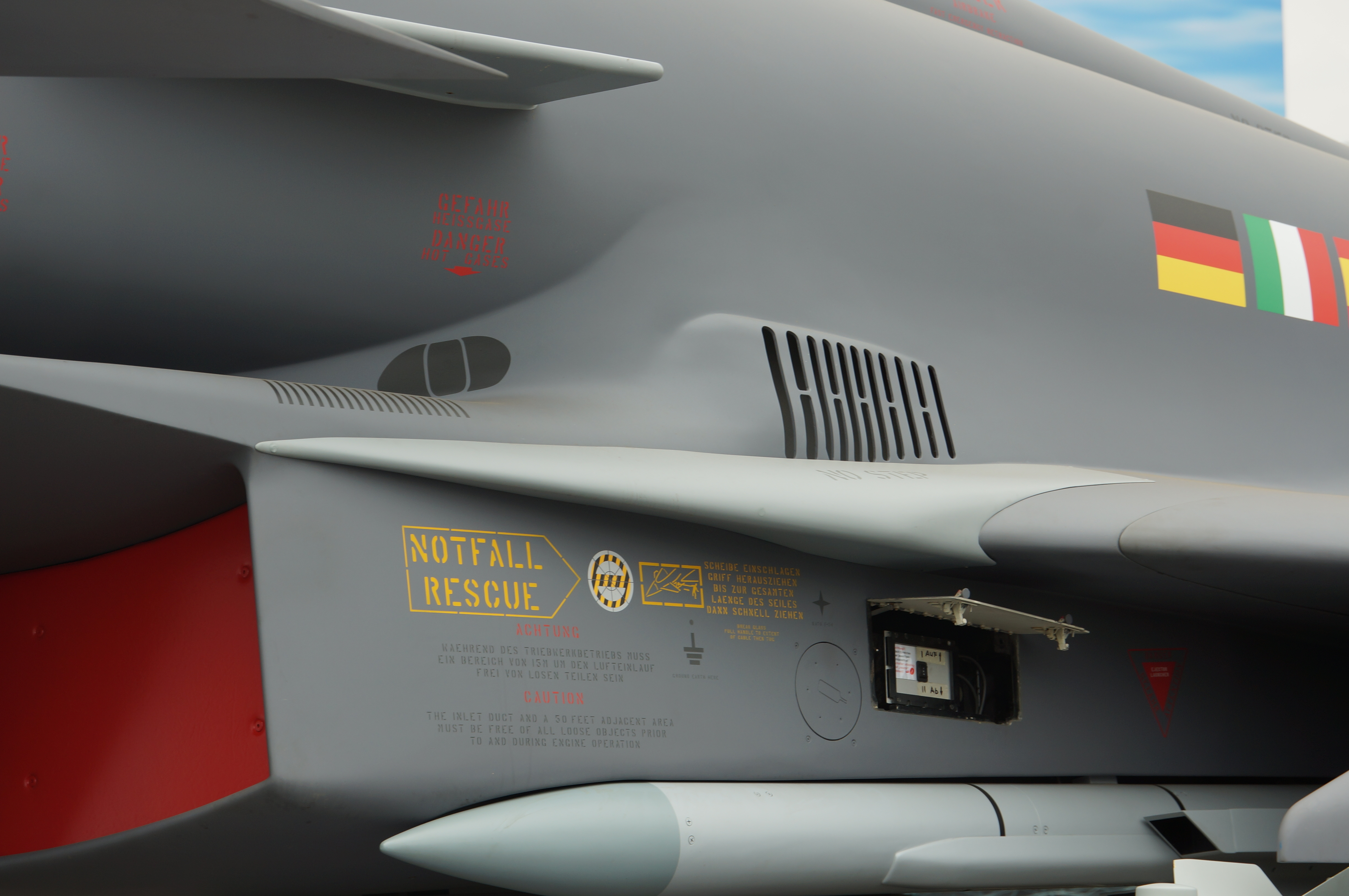
AMK Leading Edge Root Extension

In 2015, Airbus flight tested a package of aerodynamic upgrades for the Eurofighter known as the Aerodynamic Modification Kit (AMK) consisting of reshaped (delta) fuselage strakes, extended trailing-edge flaperons and leading-edge root extensions. This increases wing lift by 25% resulting in an increased turn rate, tighter turning radius, and improved nose-pointing ability at low speed with angle of attack values around 45% greater and roll rates up to 100% higher. Eurofighter's Laurie Hilditch said these improvements should increase subsonic turn rate by 15% and give the Eurofighter the sort of "knife fight in a phone box" turning capability enjoyed by rivals such as Boeing's F/A-18E/F or the Lockheed Martin F-16, without sacrificing the transonic and supersonic high-energy agility inherent to its delta wing-canard configuration. Eurofighter Project Pilot Germany Raffaele Beltrame said: "The handling qualities appeared to be markedly improved, providing more manoeuvrability, agility and precision while performing tasks representative of in-service operations. And it is extremely interesting to consider the potential benefits in the air-to-surface configuration thanks to the increased variety and flexibility of stores that can be carried." On 5 February 2026 it was announced that Eurofighter and NETMA have signed a contract for the development, testing and certification of the AMK. Airbus, Leonardo and BAE Systems will carry out development and production.

In April 2016, Finmeccanica (now Leonardo) demonstrated the air-to-ground capabilities of its Mode 5 Reverse-Identification friend or foe (IFF) system which showed that it is possible to give pilots the ability to distinguish between friendly and enemy platforms in a simple fashion using the aircraft's existing transponder. Finmeccanica said NATO is considering the system as a short- to mid-term solution for air-to-surface identification of friendly forces and thus avoid collateral damages due to friendly fire during close air support operations.

==== UK Project Centurion upgrades ====
With the confirmed retirement date of March 2019 for RAF Tornado GR4s, in 2014 the UK commenced an upgrade programme that would eventually become the £425 million Project Centurion to ensure the Typhoon was able to assume the precision strike duties of the ageing Tornado. The upgrade was delivered under different phases:

- Phase 0 – initial multirole upgrades.
- Phase 1/P2EA – MBDA Meteor integration and initial Storm Shadow Capability.
- Phase 2/P3EA – Full Storm Shadow capability as well as Brimstone integration.

Phase 1 standard aircraft were used operationally for the first time as part of Operation Shader over Iraq and Syria in 2018. On 18 December 2018 the RAF approved release to service for the full Project Centurion package.

==== Proposed upgrade for German Tornado replacement ====
On 24 April 2018, Airbus announced its offer to replace Germany's Panavia Tornado fleet, proposing the integration of new weaponry, performance enhancements and additional capabilities to the Eurofighter Typhoon. This is similar to that being performed as part of the UK's Project Centurion. Integration of air-to-ground weapons already has begun on German Typhoons as part of Project Odin. Among the weapons being offered are the Kongsberg Joint Strike Missile for the anti-ship mission and the Taurus cruise missile.

The consortium is keen to make use of the engine's growth potential to boost thrust by around 15% as well as improve fuel efficiency and range. This will be combined with a new design and enlarged 1,800-litre (475 US gallons, 396 UK gallons) fuel tank. The aircraft currently is fitted with 1,000-litre (264 US gallons, 220 UK gallons) fuel tanks. Other modifications will include the Aerodynamic Modification Kit, test flown in 2014, to improve manoeuvrability and handling, particularly with heavy weapon loads. Eurofighter says it is comfortable with delivering integration of the US B61 nuclear weapon onto the aircraft, a process that requires US certification. Paltzo said he was confident the US government would not use the certification requirements of the weapon as "leverage" to force Germany towards a US platform. A next-generation electronic warfare suite has been planned by the four-country consortium.

In November 2019, Airbus proposed a SEAD capability for the aircraft, a role which is currently performed by the Tornado ECR in German service. The Typhoon ECR would be configured with two Escort Jammer pods under the wings and two Emitter Location Systems at the wing tips. Armament would include four MBDA Meteor, two IRIS-T and six SPEAR-EW in addition to three drop tanks.

On 5 November 2020, the German government approved an order for 38 Tranche 4 with ground attack capabilities for the replacement of Tranche 1 units in German service.

The Luftwaffe ordered 15 ECR electronic warfare aircraft conversions for the Luftgestützte Wirkung im Elektromagnetischen Spektrum (luWES) requirement in March 2022. The 15 Typhoon EK model are to be transformed from existing German Typhoons and are to equipped with AGM-88E AARGM Anti-radiation missiles. The aircraft are expected to be NATO-certified by 2030.

The Tranche 4PE is a further development package aiming at integrating improved missiles (Meteor, Taurus, AMRAAM, GBU, JDAM).

=== Replacement ===
For the UK and Italy, (together with Japan) the Global Combat Air Programme is planned to provide a sixth-generation fighter, envisioned as a replacement for the RAF and Italian Air Force (AM), part of the UK's wider Future Combat Air System (FCAS).

Germany was set to replace the Eurofighter with the New Generation Fighter (NGF), co-developed with Spain and France. In June of 2026, however, the NGF project was cancelled by Germany and France.

== Design ==
=== Airframe overview ===
Typhoon flight demonstration

The Typhoon is a dual engine, loosely coupled delta canard tailless design featuring a 53-degree leading edge sweepback, relaxed stability, and a digital fly-by-wire control system. It is a highly agile aircraft at all speeds, subsonic and supersonic, achieved by having intentionally relaxed stability, combined canard and flaperon control surfaces, and a very low wing loading. The quadruplex digital fly-by-wire control system manages the inherent instability, allowing better maneuverability than direct pilot control. It is described as "carefree" and prevents the permitted manoeuvre envelope being exceeded. Roll control is primarily achieved by differential use of the flaperons. Pitch control is by coupled operation of the canards and flaperons. The wing leading edges are fitted with automatic movable slats. A single large rudder provides yaw control. Engines are fed by a chin double intake ramp situated below a splitter plate. A hydraulically operated air-brake is integrated behind the cockpit, moving into a near-vertical position to maximise drag when required. The Typhoon uses lightweight construction (82% composites consisting of 70% carbon fibre composite materials and 12% glass fibre reinforced composites) as well as aluminium lithium and titanium components on leading edge surfaces. The airframe has an estimated lifespan of 6,000 flying hours.

==== Radar signature reduction features ====
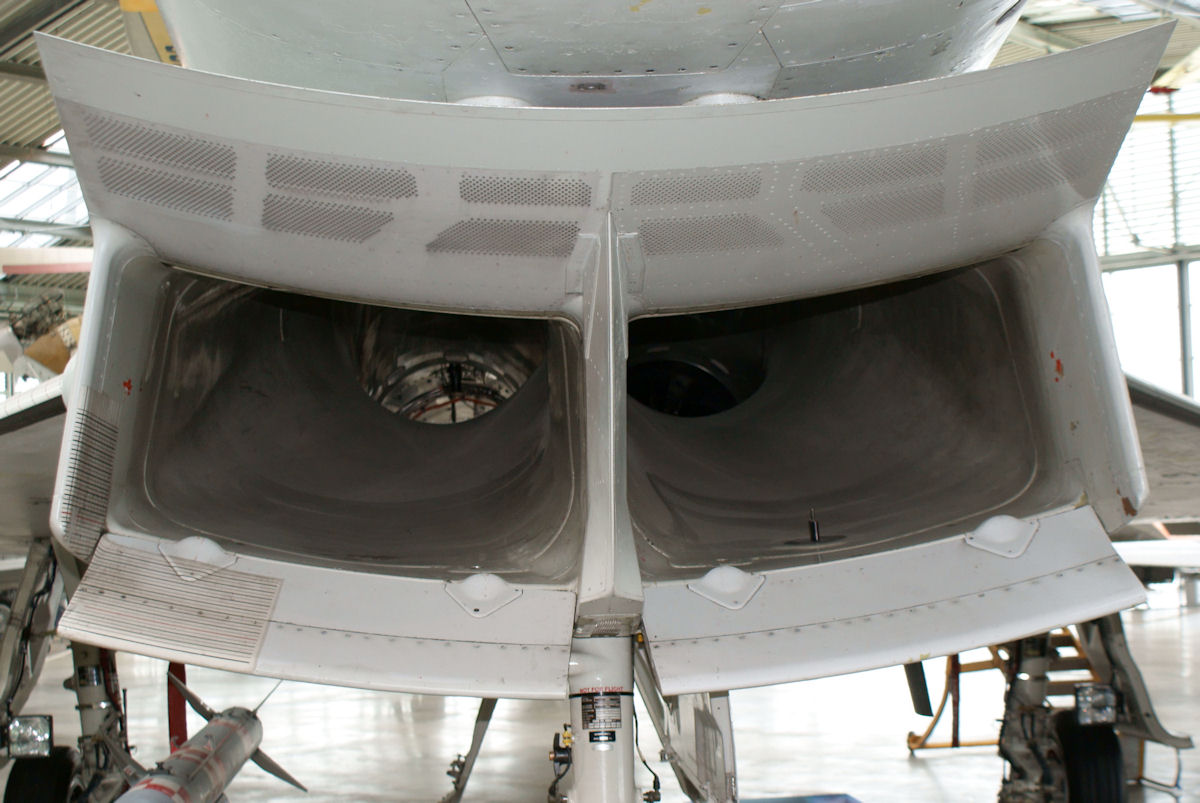
S-duct-like air intake partially conceals engine fans, a major source of radar wave reflection

Although it is not considered a stealth fighter, measures were taken to reduce the Typhoon's radar cross section (RCS), especially from the frontal aspect. For example, the Typhoon has jet inlets that conceal the front of the engines, a strong radar target, from radar. Many important potential radar targets, such as the wing, canard, and fin leading edges, are highly swept so they will reflect radar energy well away from the front. Some external weapons are mounted semi-recessed into the aircraft, partially shielding them from incoming radar. In addition, radar-absorbent materials (RAM), developed primarily by EADS/DASA, coat many of the most significant reflectors, such as the wing leading edges, the intake edges and interior, the rudder surrounds, and strakes.

The manufacturers carried out tests on the early Eurofighter prototypes to optimise the low observability characteristics of the aircraft from the early 1990s. Testing at Warton on the DA4 prototype measured the RCS of the aircraft and investigated the effects of a variety of RAM coatings and composites. Passive sensors (PIRATE IRST), which minimise the radiation of revealing electronic emissions, also reduce the likelihood of discovery. While canards generally have poor stealth characteristics from side because of corner to hull, the flight control system is designed to maintain the elevon trim and canards at an angle at which they have the smallest RCS.

=== Cockpit ===
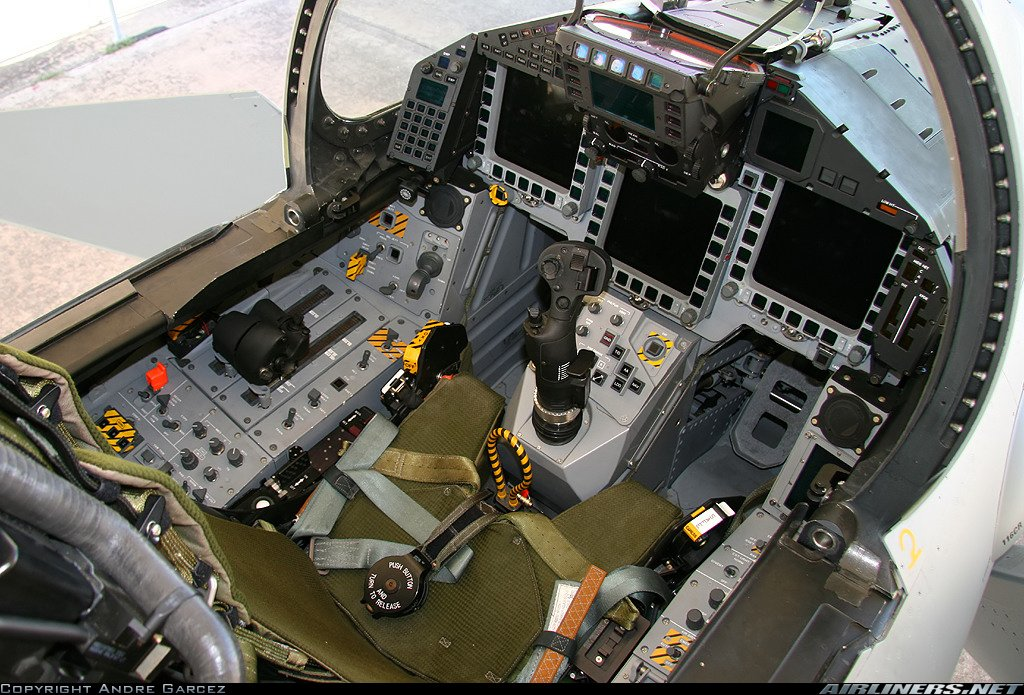
MHDDs and pedestal panel with centre stick in the Typhoon cockpit

The Typhoon features a glass cockpit without any conventional instruments. It incorporates three full colour multi-function head-down displays (MHDDs). The display formats on these MHDDs are manipulated by means of dedicated controls, softkeys, XY cursor, and voice (Direct Voice Input or DVI) command. There is a wide-angle head-up display (HUD) with forward-looking infrared (FLIR), a voice and hands-on throttle and stick (Voice+HOTAS), a Helmet Mounted Symbology System (HMSS), a manual data-entry facility (MDEF) located on the left glareshield and a fully integrated aircraft warning system with a dedicated warnings panel (DWP). There is also an interactive display panel for the MIDS. Reversionary (backup) flying instruments, lit by LEDs, are located under a hinged right glareshield. Access to the cockpit is normally via either a telescopic integral ladder or an external version. The integral ladder is stowed in the port side of the fuselage, below the cockpit.

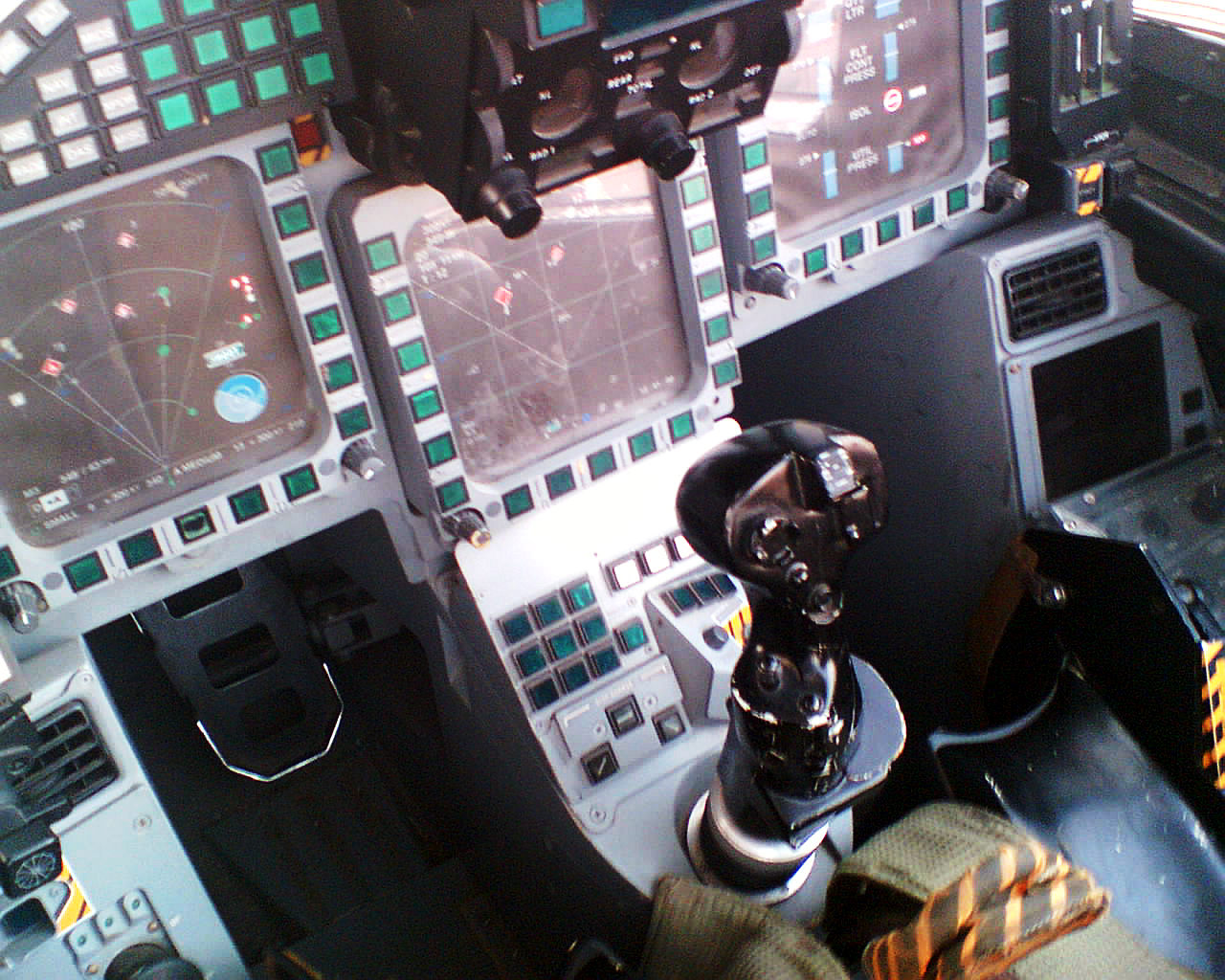
Eurofighter Typhoon cockpit.

User needs were given a high priority in the cockpit's design; both layout and functionality was developed with feedback and assessments from military pilots and a specialist testing facility. The aircraft is controlled by means of a centre stick (or control stick) and left hand throttles, designed on a Hand on Throttle and Stick (HOTAS) principle to lower pilot workload. Emergency escape is provided by a Martin-Baker Mk.16A ejection seat, with the canopy being jettisoned by two rocket motors. The HMSS was delayed by years but should have been operational by late 2011. Standard g-force protection is provided by the full-cover anti-g trousers (FCAGTs), a specially developed g suit providing sustained protection up to nine g. German and Austrian Air Force pilots wear a hydrostatic g-suit called Libelle (dragonfly) Multi G Plus instead, which also provides protection to the arms, theoretically giving more complete g tolerance.

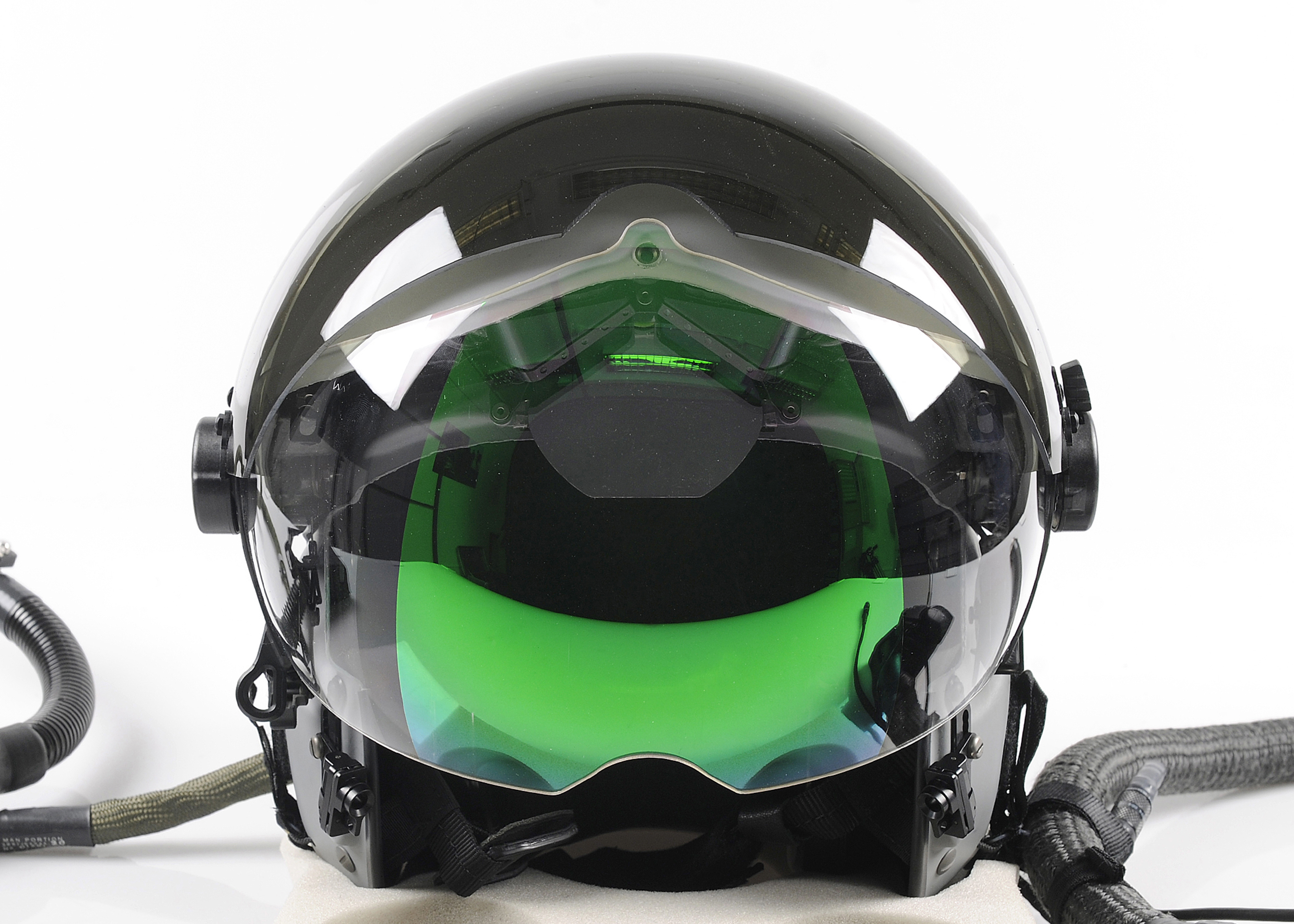
Helmet Mounted Symbology System (HMSS)

In the event of pilot disorientation, the Flight Control System allows for rapid and automatic recovery by the simple press of a button. On selection of this cockpit control, the FCS takes full control of the engines and flying controls and automatically stabilises the aircraft in a wings level, gentle climbing attitude at 300 knots until the pilot is ready to retake control. The aircraft also has an Automatic Low-Speed Recovery system (ALSR) which prevents it from departing from controlled flight at very low speeds and high angle of attack. The FCS system is able to detect a developing low-speed situation and to raise an audible and visual low-speed cockpit warning. This gives the pilot sufficient time to react and to recover the aircraft manually. If the pilot does not react, however, or if the warning is ignored, the ALSR takes control of the aircraft, selects maximum dry power for the engines and returns the aircraft to a safe flight condition. Depending on the attitude, the FCS employs an ALSR "push", "pull" or "knife-over" manoeuvre.

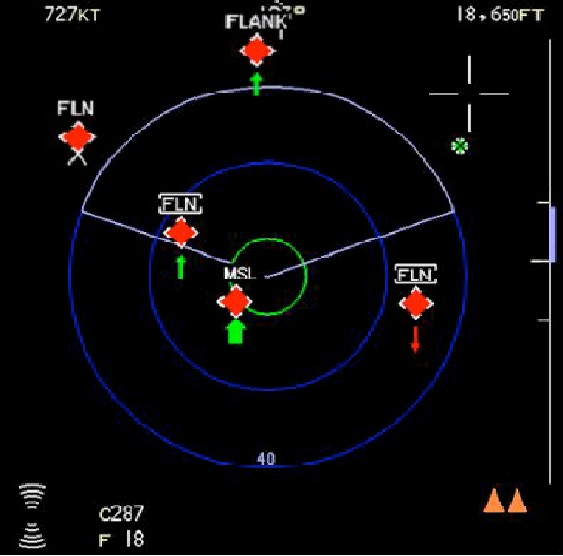
Eurofighter DASS Display, showing targets detected by the Missile Approach Warners (MAW). Down left: System online (hourglass-shaped symbol) and dispenser numbers (C = chaff, F = Flares). Down right decoy status. Right side the elevation bar from ±60°, with marks at +5°, 0° and −5°. The coloured arrows may indicate rate of climb (green) or sink (red) by their thickness.

The Typhoon Direct Voice Input (DVI) system uses a speech recognition module (SRM), developed by Smiths Aerospace and Computing Devices. It was the first production DVI system used in a military cockpit. DVI provides the pilot with an additional natural mode of command and control over approximately 26 non-critical cockpit functions to reduce pilot workload, improve aircraft safety, and expand mission capabilities. An important step in the development of the DVI occurred in 1987 when Texas Instruments completed the TMS-320-C30, a digital signal processor, enabling reductions in the size and system complexity required. The project was given the go-ahead in July 1997 with development carried out on the Eurofighter Active Cockpit Simulator at Warton. The DVI system is speaker-dependent, requiring each pilot to create a template. It is not used for safety-critical or weapon-critical tasks, such as weapon release or lowering of the undercarriage. Voice commands are confirmed by visual or aural feedback, and serves to reduce pilot workload. All functions are also achievable by means of a conventional button-press or soft-key selections; functions include display management, communications, and management of various systems. EADS Defence and Security in Spain has worked on a new non-template DVI module to allow for continuous speech recognition, speaker voice recognition with common databases (e.g., British English, American English, etc.) and other improvements.

BAE Systems has been awarded a contract to develop new touch screen displays in the cockpit and enhance data processing capability for Eurofighter Typhoon.

=== Avionics ===
Navigation is via both GPS and an inertial navigation system. The Typhoon can use Instrument Landing System (ILS) for landing in poor weather. The aircraft also features an enhanced ground proximity warning system (GPWS) based on the TERPROM Terrain Referenced Navigation (TRN) system used by the Panavia Tornado. MIDS provides a Link 16 data link.

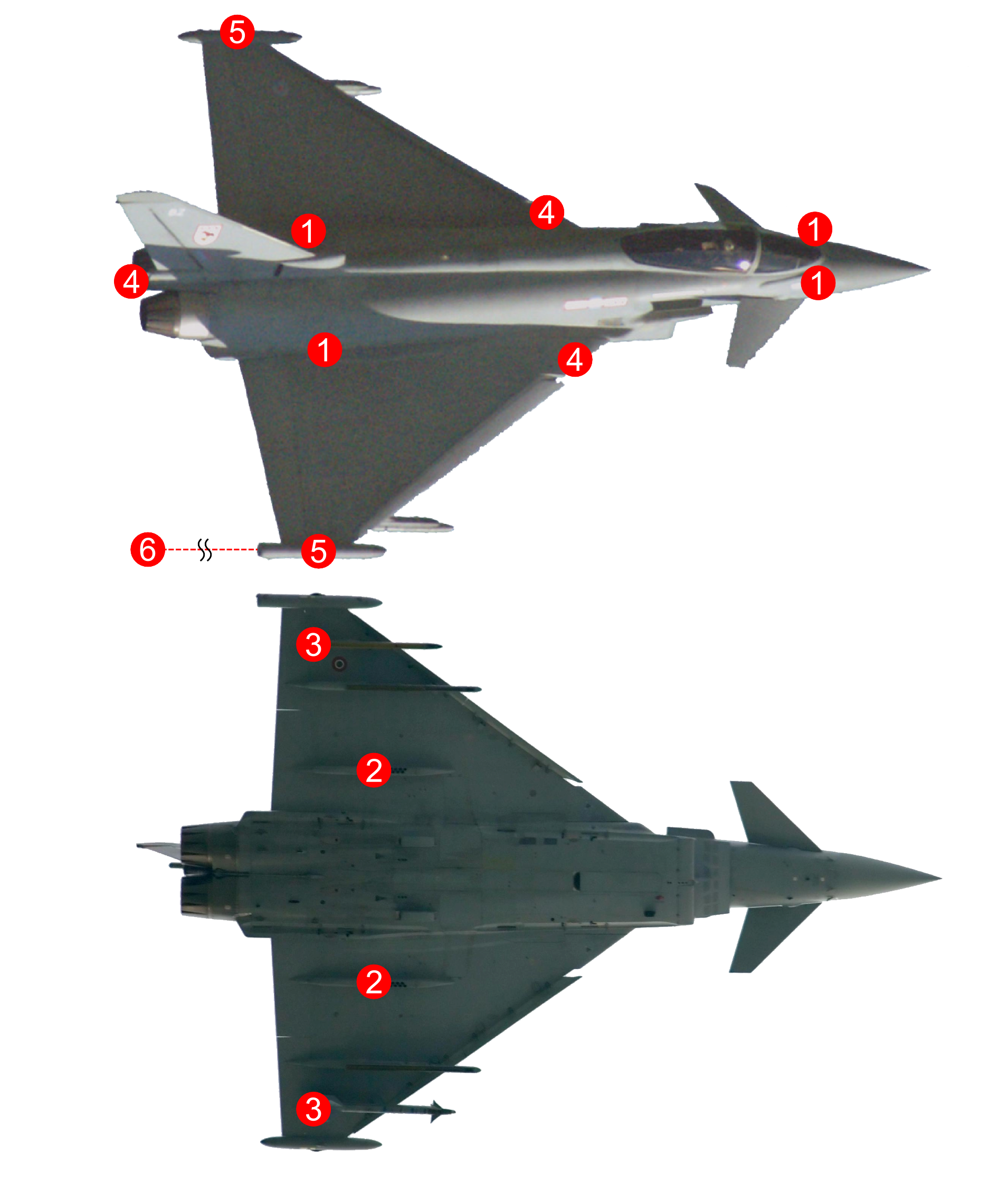
Praetorian DASS: 1. Laser warners; 2. Flare launchers (IR decoys); 3. Chaff dispensers; 4. Missile warners; 5. Wingtip pods for ESCM; 6. Towed decoy

The aircraft employs a sophisticated and highly integrated Defensive Aids Sub-System named Praetorian (formerly Euro-DASS). Praetorian monitors and responds automatically to air and surface threats, provides an all-round prioritised assessment, and can respond to multiple threats simultaneously. Threat detection methods include a Radar warning receiver (RWR), a missile warning system (MWS) and a laser warning receiver (LWR, only on UK Typhoons). Protective countermeasures consist of chaff, flares, an electronic countermeasures (ECM) suite, and a towed radar decoy (TRD). The ESM-ECM and MWS consists of 16 antenna array assemblies and 10 radomes.

Historically, each sensor in an aircraft is treated as a discrete source of information; however, this can result in conflicting data and limits the scope for the automation of systems, increasing pilot workload. To overcome this, the Typhoon employs sensor fusion techniques. In the Typhoon, fusion of all data sources is achieved through the Attack and Identification System, or AIS. This combines data from the major on-board sensors along with any information obtained from off-board platforms such as AWACS and MIDS. Additionally the AIS integrates all the other major offensive and defensive systems (e.g., DASS & communications). The AIS physically comprises two essentially separate units: the Attack Computer (AC) and the Navigation Computer (NC).

By having a single source of information, pilot workload should be reduced by removing the possibility of conflicting data and the need for cross-checking, improving situational awareness and increasing systems automation. In practice the AIS should allow the Eurofighter to identify targets at distances in excess of 150 nmi (280 km; 170 mi) and acquire and auto-prioritise them at over 100 nmi (190 km; 120 mi). In addition, the AIS offers the ability to automatically control emissions from the aircraft, so called EMCON (from EMissions CONtrol). This should aid in limiting the detectability of the Typhoon by opposing aircraft further reducing pilot workload.

In 2017, an RAF Eurofighter Typhoon demonstrated interoperability with the F-35B using its Multifunction Advanced Data Link (MADL) in a two-week trial known as Babel Fish III in the Mojave Desert. This was achieved by translating the MADL messages into Link 16 format, allowing an F-35 in stealth mode to communicate directly with the Typhoon.

=== Radar and sensors ===
==== Captor radar ====
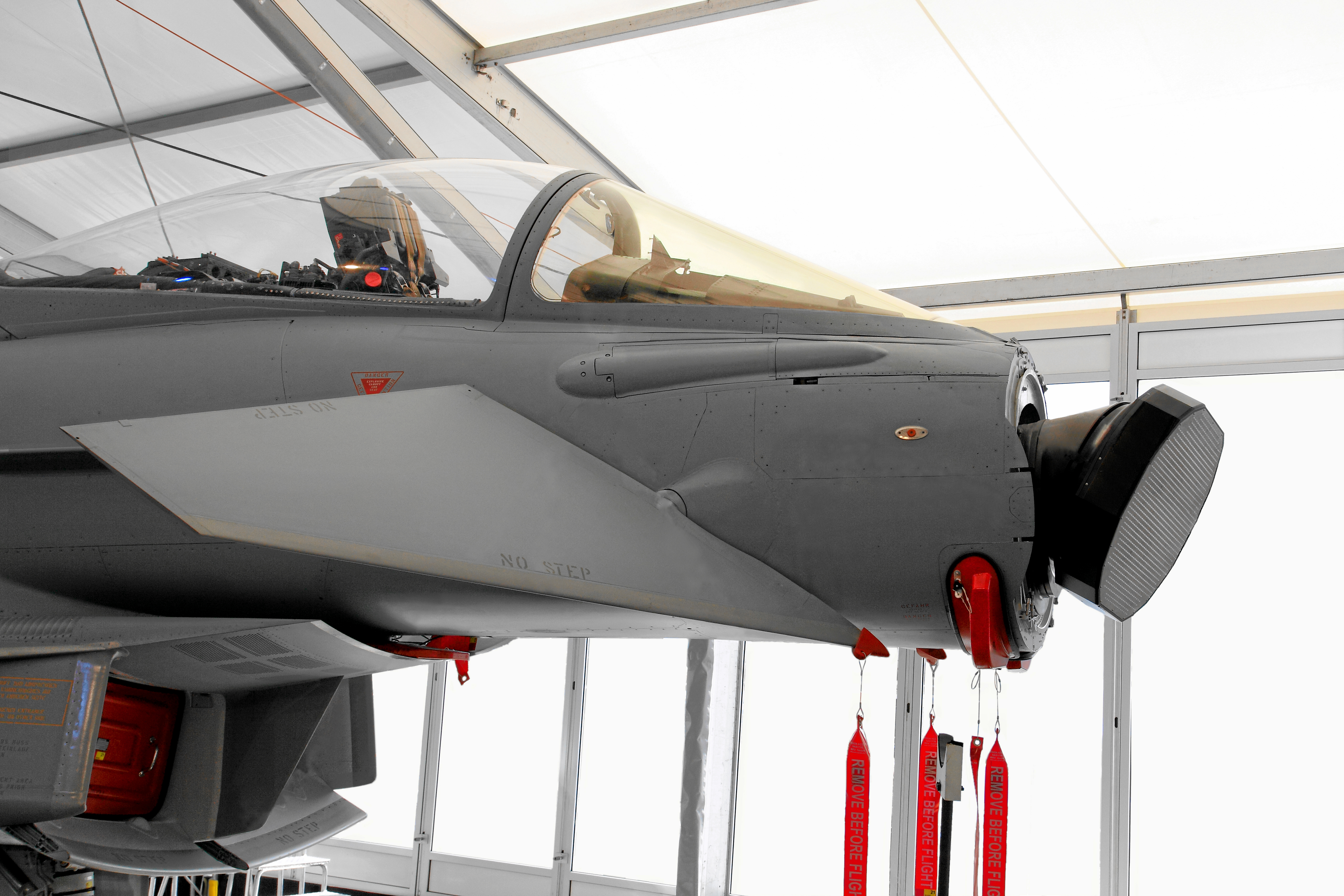
CAPTOR-E demonstrator

The Euroradar Captor is a mechanical multi-mode pulse Doppler radar designed for the Eurofighter Typhoon. The Eurofighter operates automatic Emission Controls (EMCON) to reduce the electromagnetic emissions of the current CAPTOR mechanically scanned radar. The Captor-M has three working channels, one intended for classification of jammer and for jamming suppression. A succession of radar software upgrades have enhanced the air-to-air capability of the radar. These upgrades have included the R2P programme (initially UK only, and known as T2P when 'ported' to the Tranche 2 aircraft) which is being followed by R2Q/T2Q. R2P was applied to eight German Typhoons deployed on Red Flag Alaska in 2012.

Captor-E AESA variant

The Captor-E is an AESA derivative of the original Captor radar. It is also known as CAESAR (Captor Active Electronically Scanned Array Radar). The Captor-E is developed by the Euroradar Consortium, led by Selex ES.

Synthetic aperture radar is expected to be fielded as part of the AESA radar upgrade, which will give the Eurofighter an all-weather ground attack capability. The conversion to AESA will also give the Eurofighter a low probability of intercept radar with improved jam resistance. The upgraded radar will feature a gimbal to meet RAF requirements for a wider scan field than a fixed AESA, as the coverage of a fixed AESA is limited to 120° in azimuth and elevation. A senior EADS radar expert has claimed that Captor-E is capable of detecting an F-35 from roughly 59 kilometres (37 mi) away.

The first flight of a Eurofighter equipped with a "mass model" of the Captor-E occurred in late February 2014, with flight tests of the actual radar beginning in July of that year. On 19 November 2014 the contract to upgrade to the Captor-E was signed at the offices of EuroRadar lead Selex ES in Edinburgh, in a deal worth €1bn. Kuwait became the launch customer for the Captor-E active electronically scanned array radar in April 2016. Germany has announced the intention to integrate the AESA Captor-E into their Typhoons, beginning in 2022.

In January 2024, it was announced that the first European Common Radar System (ECRS) MK2 had been fitted to an RAF operated test and evaluation Typhoon ZK355 (BS116), at BAE Systems' site Warton. Leonardo and DE&S announced that the initial flight was scheduled to take place later in 2024.

The AESA radar program for the Eurofighter is now split into three European Common Radar System (ECRS) variants:

- ECRS Mk0: also called Radar One Plus, this is the baseline Captor-E model which was developed by Leonardo. Hardware development is complete and it is fitted to aircraft delivered to Kuwait and Qatar.
- ECRS Mk1: an upgrade of the Mk0 being developed by Hensoldt/Indra, for Germany and Spain. It is to be retrofitted to their Tranche 2 and 3 aircraft, and also fitted to both countries' new Tranche 4 models.
- ECRS Mk2: also known as Radar Two, a different version developed from the ARTS and Bright Adder demonstrators, and from the Gripen E's ES-05 Raven radar. With electronic warfare/attack capabilities, it is being developed by Leonardo for the RAF, and integrated by BAE Systems. It will initially be applied to Tranche 3 aircraft, but the RAF may upgrade Tranche 2 later. Italy has joined development of the ECRS Mk2, which was part of the Typhoon offer to Finland for its HX Fighter Program.

==== IRST ====
The Passive Infra-Red Airborne Track Equipment (PIRATE) system is an infrared search and track (IRST) system mounted on the port side of the fuselage, forward of the windscreen. Selex ES is the lead contractor which, along with Thales Optronics (system technical authority) and Tecnobit of Spain, make up the EUROFIRST consortium responsible for the system's design and development. Eurofighters starting with Tranche 1 block 5 have the PIRATE. The first Eurofighter Typhoon with PIRATE-IRST was delivered to the Italian Aeronautica Militare in August 2007. More advanced targeting capabilities can be provided with the addition of a targeting pod such as the Litening pod.

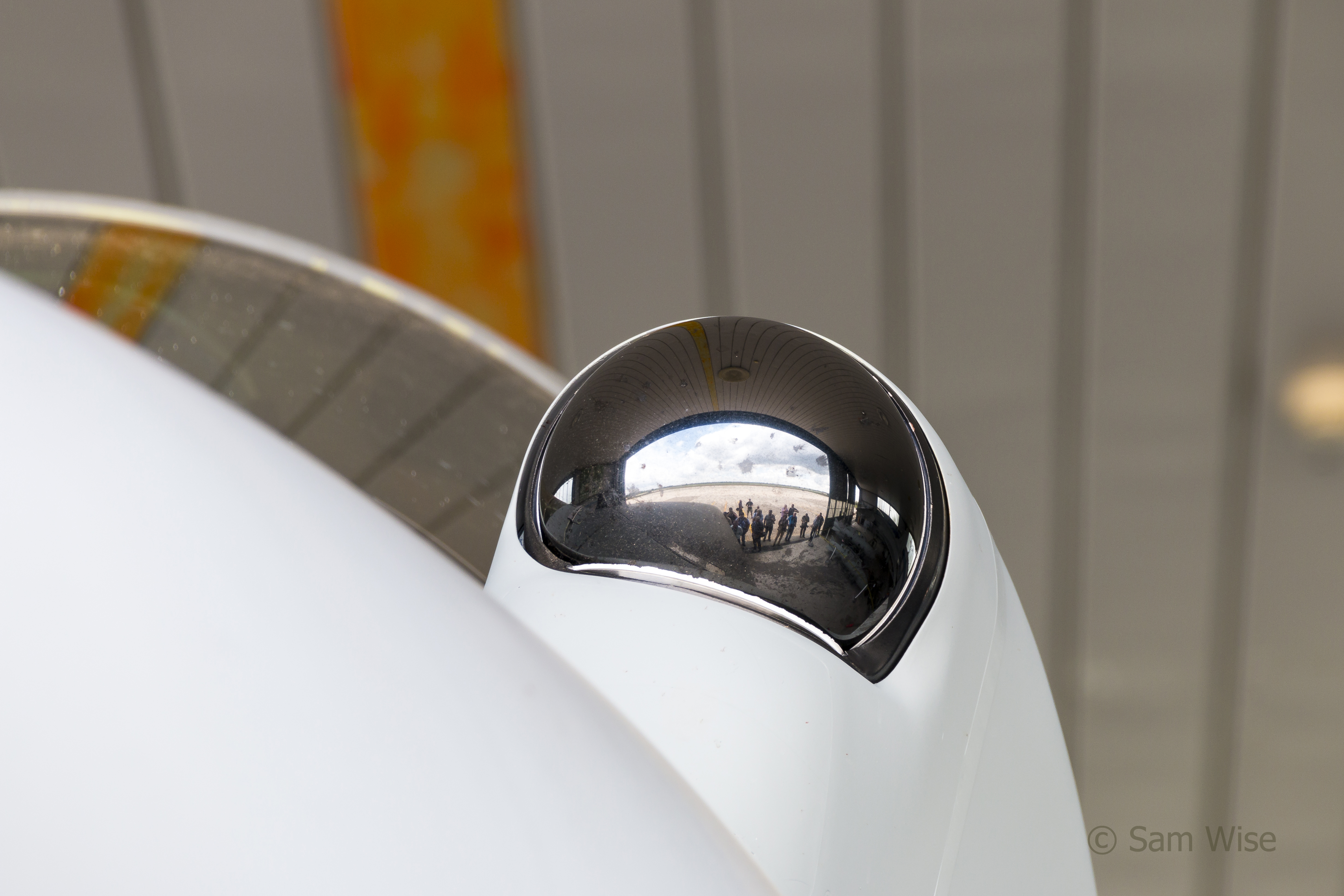
PIRATE IRST

When used with the radar in an air-to-air role, it functions as an infrared search and track system, providing passive target detection and tracking. The system can detect variations in temperature at a long range. It also provides a navigation and landing aid. PIRATE is linked to the pilot's helmet-mounted display. It allows the detection of both hot exhaust plumes of jet engines and surface heating caused by friction; processing techniques further enhance the output, giving a near-high resolution image of targets. The output can be directed to any of the Multi-function Head Down Displays, and can also be overlaid on both the Helmet Mounted Sight and the Head Up Display.

Up to 200 targets can be simultaneously tracked using one of several different modes; Multiple Target Track (MTT), Single Target Track (STT), Single Target Track Ident (STTI), Sector Acquisition and Slaved Acquisition. In MTT mode the system will scan a designated volume space looking for potential targets. In STT mode PIRATE will provide tracking of a single designated target. An addition to this mode, STT Ident allows for visual identification of the target, the resolution being superior to CAPTOR's. When in Sector Acquisition mode PIRATE will scan a volume of space under direction of another onboard sensor such as CAPTOR. In Slave Acquisition, off-board sensors are used with PIRATE being commanded by data obtained from an AWACS or other source. When a target is found in either of these modes, PIRATE will automatically designate it and switch to STT.

Once a target has been tracked and identified, PIRATE can be used to cue an appropriately equipped short range missile, i.e. a missile with a high off-boresight tracking capability such as ASRAAM. Additionally the data can be used to augment that of Captor or off-board sensor information via the AIS. This should enable the Typhoon to overcome severe ECM environments and still engage its targets. PIRATE also has a passive ranging capability although the system remains limited when providing passive firing solutions, as it does not have a laser rangefinder.

=== Engines ===
The Eurofighter Typhoon is fitted with two Eurojet EJ200 engines, each capable of providing up to 60 kN (13,500 lbf) of dry thrust and >90 kN (20,230 lbf) with afterburners. Using the "war" setting, dry thrust increases by 15% to 69 kN (15,511 lbf) per engine and afterburners by 5% to 95 kN (21,356 lbf) per engine and for a few seconds, up to 102 kN (22,930 lbf) thrust without damaging the engine. The EJ200 engine combines the leading technologies from each of the four European companies, using advanced digital control and health monitoring; wide chord aerofoils and single crystal turbine blades; and a convergent / divergent exhaust nozzle to give high thrust-to-weight ratio, multimission capability, supercruise performance, low fuel consumption, low cost of ownership, modular construction and growth potential.

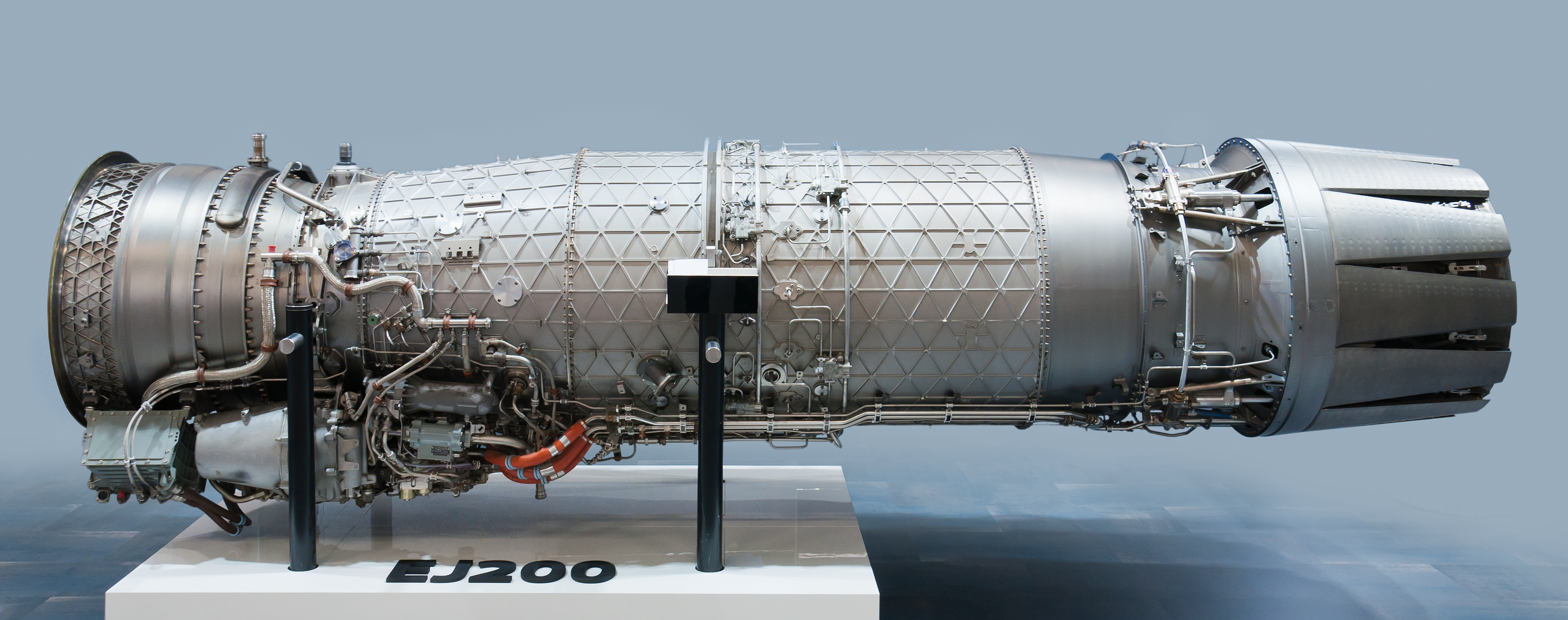
EJ200 engine on display at Paris Air Show 2013

The Typhoon is capable of supersonic cruise without using afterburners (referred to as supercruise). Air Forces Monthly gives a maximum supercruise speed of Mach 1.1 for the RAF FGR4 multirole version, however in a Singaporean evaluation, a Typhoon managed to supercruise at Mach 1.21 on a hot day with a combat load. Eurofighter states that the Typhoon can supercruise at Mach 1.5. As with the F-22, the Eurofighter can launch weapons while under supercruise to extend their ranges via this "running start". In 2007, the EJ200 engine had accumulated 50,000 Engine Flying Hours in service with the four Nation Air Forces (Germany, UK, Spain and Italy).

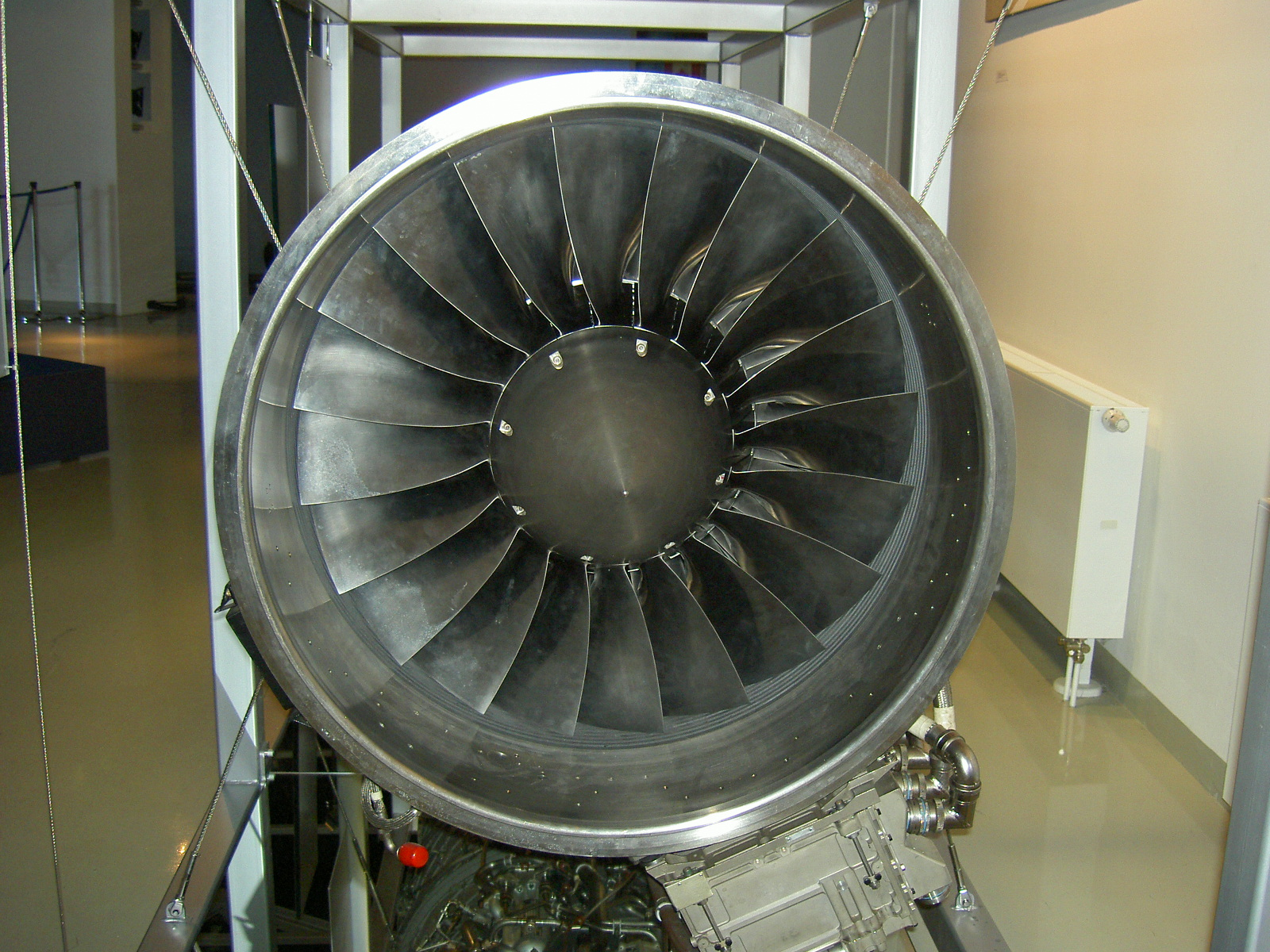
The aircraft's turbofan engine (front)

The EJ200 engine has the potential to be fitted with a thrust vectoring control (TVC) nozzle, which the Eurofighter and Eurojet consortium have been actively developing and testing, primarily for export but also for future upgrades of the fleet. TVC could reduce fuel burn on a typical Typhoon mission by up to 5%, as well as increase available thrust in supercruise by up to 7% and take-off thrust by 2%. Clemens Linden, Eurojet TURBO GmbH CEO, speaking at the 2018 Farnborough International Air Show, said "15 per cent more thrust would allow pilots to operate with a heavily loaded aircraft in the battlespace with the same performance levels as they have today. The technology insertion also provides more persistence – giving aircraft longer range or longer loitering time. To achieve more thrust we would increase the airflow and pressure ratios of the high and low pressure compressors and run higher temperatures in the turbines by using the latest generation single crystal turbine blade materials. And with higher aerodynamic efficiencies we can achieve a lower fuel burn. A third area of improvement would be the engine exhaust nozzle which would be upgraded with the installation of a 2-parametric version allowing independent and optimized adjustment of the throat and exit area at all flight conditions, providing fuel burn advantages. The technologies for the different components are at a Technology readiness level of between 7 and 9. The nozzle has been at ITP in Spain on a test bed for 400 hours."

=== Performance ===
The Typhoon's combat performance, compared to the F-22 Raptor and F-35 Lightning II fighters and the French Dassault Rafale, has been the subject of much discussion. In March 2005, United States Air Force Chief of Staff General John P. Jumper, then the only person to have flown both the Eurofighter Typhoon and the Raptor, said:

The Eurofighter is both agile and sophisticated, but is still difficult to compare to the F/A-22 Raptor. They are different kinds of airplanes to start with; it's like asking us to compare a NASCAR car with a Formula One car. They are both exciting in different ways, but they are designed for different levels of performance. ... The Eurofighter is certainly, as far as smoothness of controls and the ability to pull (and sustain high G forces), very impressive. That is what it was designed to do, especially the version I flew, with the avionics, the color moving map displays, etc. — all absolutely top notch. The manoeuvrability of the aeroplane in close-in combat was also very impressive. The F/A-22 performs in much the same way as the Eurofighter. But it has additional capabilities that allow it to perform the [US] Air Force's unique missions. ... The F/A-22 Raptor has stealth and supercruise. It has the ability to penetrate virtually undetected.

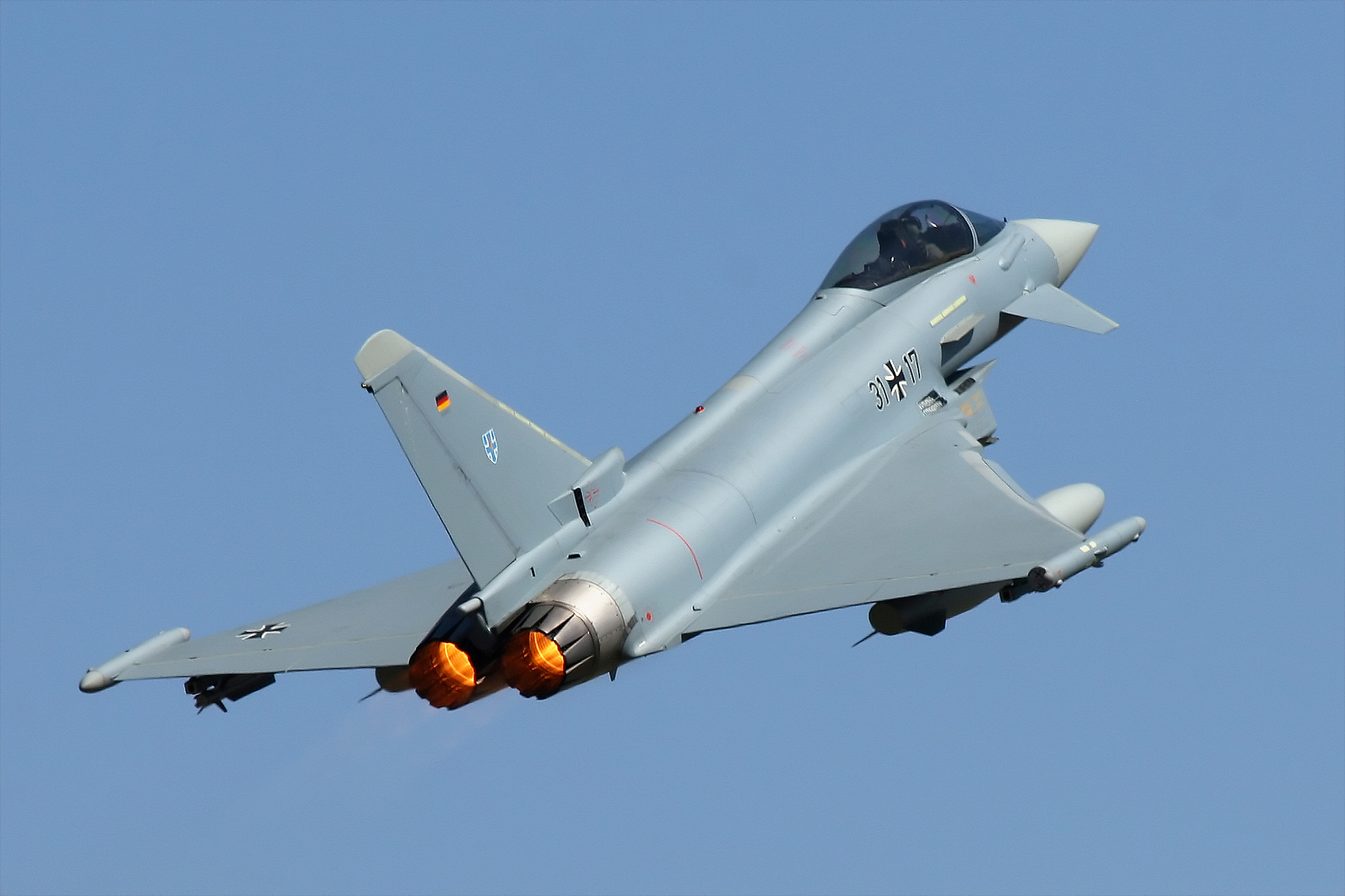
German Air Force Eurofighter Typhoon 31+17 during takeoff, July 2010

In the 2005 Singapore evaluation, the Typhoon won all three combat tests, including one in which a single Typhoon defeated three RSAF F-16s, and reliably completed all planned flight tests. In July 2009, Former Chief of Air Staff for the RAF, Air Chief Marshal Sir Glenn Torpy, said that "The Eurofighter Typhoon is an excellent aircraft. It is to be the backbone of the Royal Air Force along with the JSF."

In July 2007, Indian Air Force Su-30MKI fighters participated in the Indra-Dhanush exercise with the RAF's Typhoon. This was the first time the two fighters had taken part in such an exercise. The IAF pilots were impressed by the Typhoon's agility. In 2015, Indian Air Force Su-30MKIs again participated in a Indra-Dhanush exercise with RAF Typhoons.

=== Armament ===
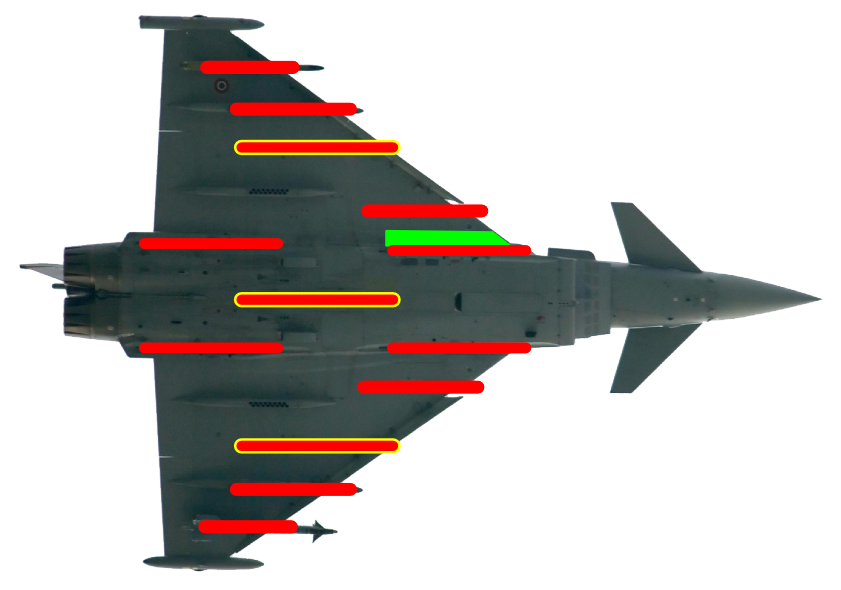
The Eurofighter Typhoon has 13 hardpoints for carrying armament. Hardpoint Hard point with the ability to hold a droptank Internal cannon

==== Air to ground ====
The Typhoon is a multi-role fighter with maturing air-to-ground capabilities. The initial absence of air-to-ground capability is believed to have been a factor in the type's rejection from Singapore's fighter competition in 2005. At the time it was claimed that Singapore was concerned about the delivery timescale and the ability of the Eurofighter partner nations to fund the required capability packages. Tranche 1 aircraft could drop laser-guided bombs in conjunction with third-party designators but the anticipated deployment of Typhoon to Afghanistan meant that the UK required self-contained bombing capabilities before the other partners. In 2006 the UK embarked on the £73m Change Proposal 193 (CP193) to give an "austere" air-to-surface capability using GBU-16 Paveway II and Rafael/Ultra Electronics Litening III laser designator for Tranche 1 Block 5 aircraft. Aircraft with this upgrade were designated Typhoon FGR4 by the RAF.

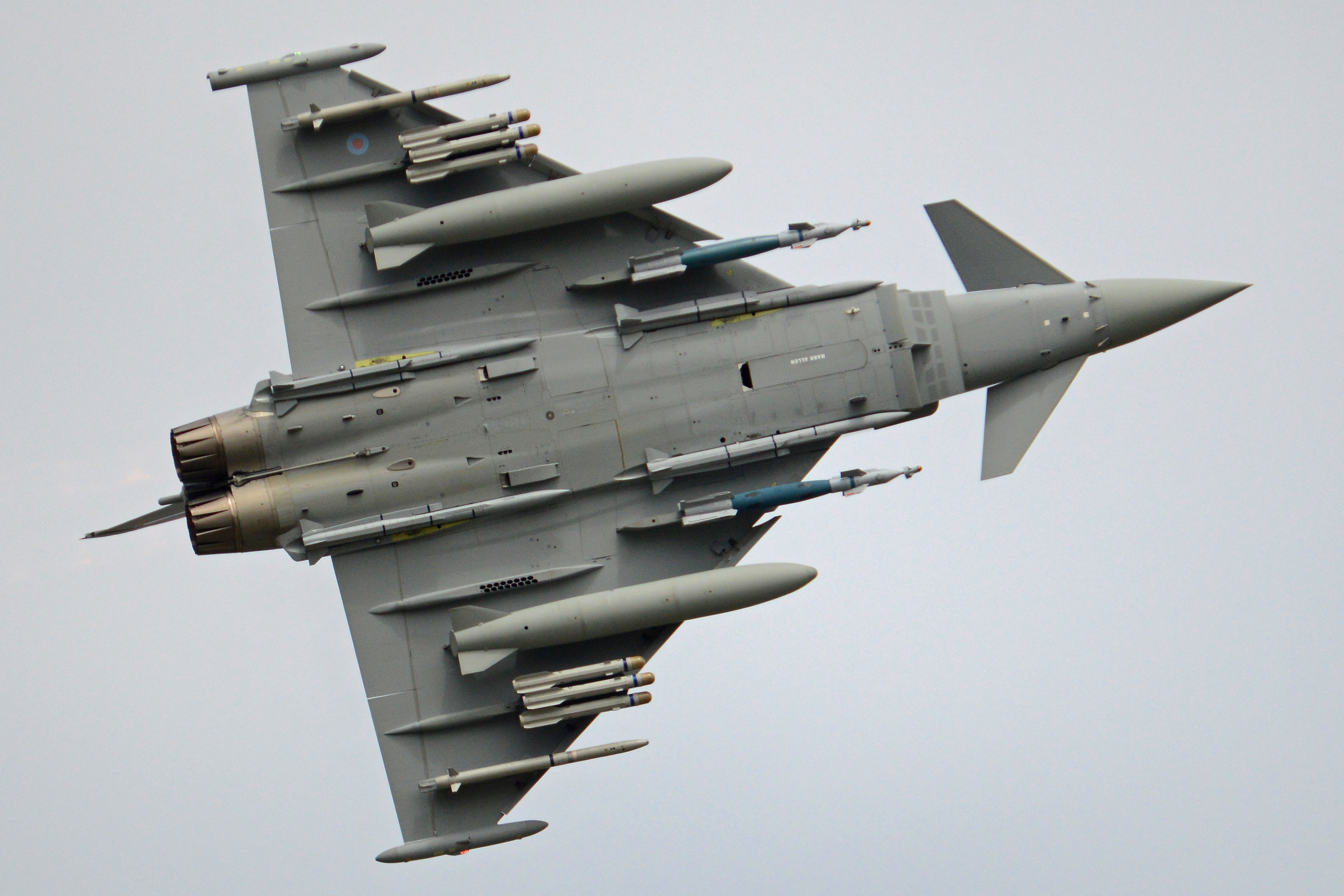
Eurofighter operated by BAE Systems as a demonstrator with a full weapons load. Seen displaying at the 2016 Royal International Air Tattoo (RIAT), Fairford, UK.

Similar capability was added to Tranche 2 aircraft on the main development pathway as part of the Phase 1 Enhancements. P1Ea (SRP10) entered service in 2013 Q1 and added the use of Paveway IV, EGBU16 and the cannon against surface targets. P1Eb (SRP12) added full integration with GPS bombs such as GBU-10 Paveway II, GBU-16 Paveway II, Paveway IV and a new real-time operating system that allows multiple targets to be attacked in a single run. This new system will form the basis for future weapons integration by individual countries under the Phase 2 Enhancements. The Storm Shadow and KEPD 350 (Taurus) cruise missiles, together with the Meteor Beyond Visual Range Air-to-Air missile flight trials had been successfully completed by January 2016. The Storm Shadow and Meteor firings are part of the Phase 2 Enhancement (P2E) programme which introduced a range of new and improved long range attack capabilities to Typhoon. In addition to Meteor and Storm Shadow, the first live firing of MBDA's Brimstone air-to-surface missile, part of the Phase 3 Enhancements (P3E) programme, was successfully completed in July 2017.

German aircraft can carry four GBU-48 1000 lb bombs.

An anti-ship capability has been studied but has not yet been contracted. Weapon options for this role could include Boeing Harpoon, MBDA Marte, "Sea Brimstone", and RBS-15.

==== Air to air ====
The Typhoon can carry a mixture of air-to-air weaponry to fulfill its role as an air superiority fighter. Available weapons include the AIM-120 AMRAAM and MBDA Meteor beyond visual range radar-guided missiles and the ASRAAM, IRIS-T, and AIM-9 Sidewinder short-range IR-guided missiles.

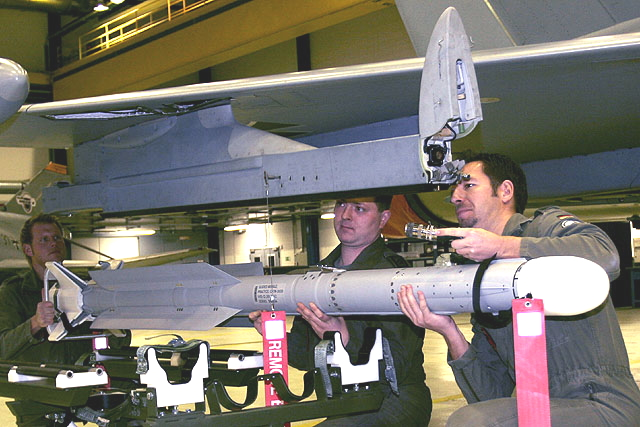
German ground crew mount an IRIS-T to a Eurofighter

The Typhoon also carries a specially developed variant of the Mauser BK-27 27 mm cannon that was developed originally for the Panavia Tornado. This is a single-barrel, electrically fired, gas-operated revolver cannon with a new linkless feed system which is located in the starboard wing root, and is capable of firing up to 1700 rounds per minute. There was a proposal on cost grounds in 1999 to limit UK gun-armament fit to the first 53 batch-1 aircraft and not used operationally, but this decision was reversed in 2006. The aircraft carries 150 rounds.

In his 2022 book Typhoon, former RAF pilot Mike Sutton reported that his 27 mm cannon had jammed during a strafing run in Syria, against ISIS targets, while supporting Allied ground units. According to his book, the Typhoon was originally intended to be built without an internal gun, like the F-4 Phantom and the Harrier jump jet. A decision to install an internal gun had led to "manufacturing issues". Sutton claimed that, during his strafing run, the gun jammed after 26 rounds, with the HUD showing a "GUN FAIL" warning legend. During the debrief it transpired that the problem was well known to both the pilots and ground crews.

==== Summary ====
Weapon	Users
Guns
Mauser BK-27 autocannon (27mm)	Germany, Spain, Italy, UK, Austria, Saudi Arabia, Oman
Air-to-air missiles
ASRAAM	UK, Turkey
IRIS-T	Germany, Spain, Italy, Austria, Saudi Arabia, Turkey
AIM-9L Sidewinder	Germany, Spain, Italy, UK, Austria, Saudi Arabia, Oman
AIM-120 AMRAAM	Germany, Spain, Italy, UK, Saudi Arabia, Oman, Turkey
MBDA Meteor	UK, Germany, Spain, Italy, Turkey
Advanced Precision Kill Weapon System	UK
Air-to-surface missiles
Taurus KEPD 350	Germany, Spain
Storm Shadow	UK, Italy, Saudi Arabia, Turkey
Brimstone II	UK, Germany, Saudi Arabia, Turkey
Advanced Precision Kill Weapon System	UK
Air-to-surface guided bombs
Paveway II (GBU-10) 2,000 lb bomb	Spain
Paveway II (GBU-16) 1,000 lb bomb	UK, Spain, Oman
Paveway II (GBU-48) 1,000 lb bomb	UK, Germany, Spain, Saudi Arabia
Paveway IV	UK, Saudi Arabia, Turkey
Joint Direct Attack Munition (GBU-54)	Germany

== Operational history ==
=== Austrian Air Force (Luftstreitkräfte) ===
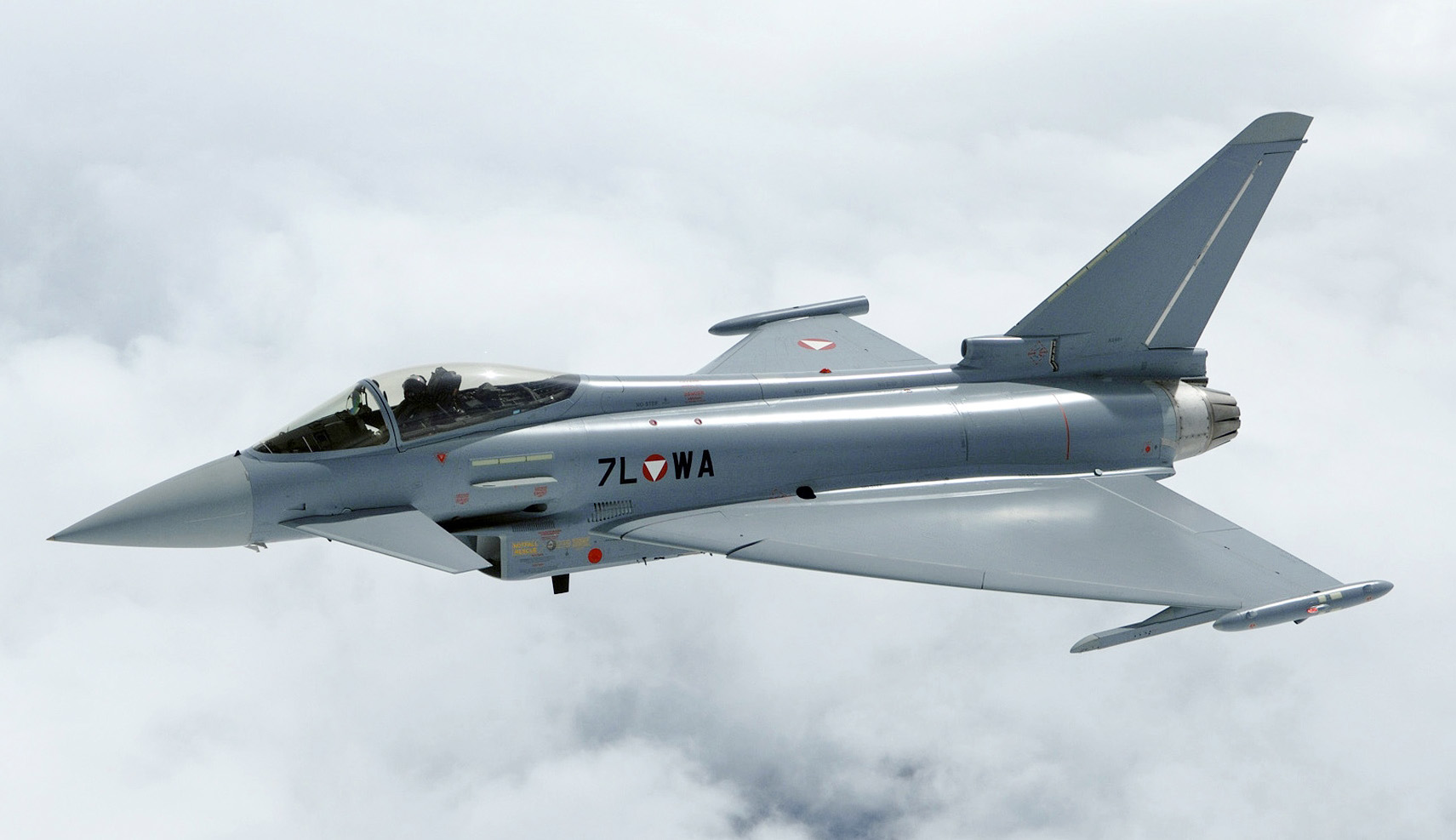
Austrian Air Force Eurofighter 7L-WA in flight to Zeltweg Air Base, July 2007

In 2002, Austria selected the Typhoon as its new air defence aircraft, it having beaten the F-16 and the Saab Gripen in competition. The purchase of 18 Typhoons was agreed on 1 July 2003, however this was reduced to 15 in June 2007. The first aircraft (7L-WA) was delivered on 12 July 2007 to Zeltweg Air Base and formally entered service with the Austrian Air Force. A 2008 report by the Austrian Court of Audit calculated, that instead of getting 18 Tranche 2 jets at a price of €109 million each, as stipulated by the original contract, the revised deal, agreed to by Minister Norbert Darabos, meant that Austria was paying an increased unit price of €114 million for 15 partially used Tranche 1 jets. In July 2008, the Luftstreitkräfte assigned the Eurofighter to Quick Reaction Alert (QRA) duties, by the end of the year they had been scrambled 73 times.

Austrian prosecutors are investigating allegations that up to €100 million was made available to lobbyists to influence the original purchase decision in favour of the Eurofighter. By October 2013, all Typhoons in service with Austria had been upgraded to the latest Tranche 1 standard. In 2014, due to defence budget restrictions, there were only 12 pilots available to fly the 15 aircraft in Austria's Air Force. In February 2017, Austrian defence minister Hans Peter Doskozil accused Airbus of fraudulent intent following a probe that allegedly unveiled corruption linked to the order of Typhoon jets.

In July 2017, the Austria Defence Ministry announced that it would be replacing all its Typhoon aircraft by 2020. The ministry said continued use of its Typhoons over their 30-year life span would cost about €5 billion with the bulk being for maintenance. By comparison it is estimated that buying and operating a new fleet of 15 single-seat and three twin-seat fighters would save €2 billion over that period. Austria plans to explore a government-to-government sale or lease agreement to avoid a lengthy and costly tender process with a manufacturer. Possible replacements include the Gripen and the F-16.

On 20 July 2020, a letter written by Indonesia's defence minister, Prabowo Subianto, was published by Indonesian news outlets expressing interest in acquiring Austria's entire fleet of Typhoon jets. The move was criticized due to the "secondhand" nature of the aircraft, its high operational cost, and past legal dispute between Austria Defence Ministry and Airbus.

=== German Air Force (Luftwaffe) ===
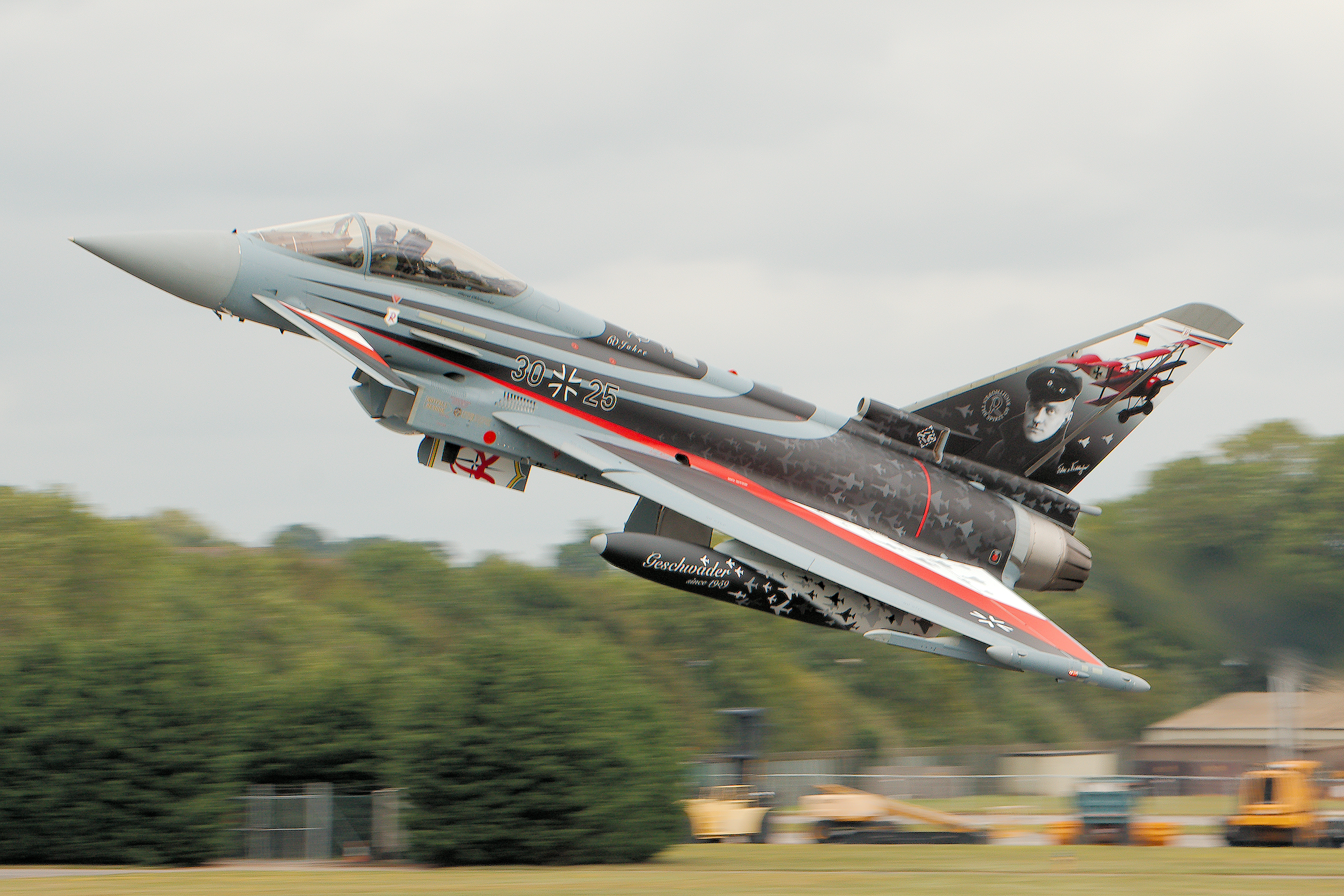
Luftwaffe Eurofighter 30+25 departing RIAT, July 2019

On 4 August 2003, the German Air Force accepted its first series production Eurofighter (30+03) starting the replacement process of the Mikoyan MiG-29s inherited from the East German Air Force. The first Luftwaffe Wing to accept the Eurofighter was Jagdgeschwader 73 "Steinhoff" on 30 April 2004 at Rostock–Laage Airport. The second Wing was Jagdgeschwader 74 (JG74) on 25 July 2006, with four Eurofighters arriving at Neuburg Air Base, beginning the replacement of JG74's McDonnell Douglas F-4F Phantom IIs.

The Luftwaffe assigned their Eurofighters to QRA on 3 June 2008, taking over from the F-4F Phantom II.

On 28 October 2014, while deployed to Ämari Air Base in Estonia as part of the NATO Baltic Air Policing mission, German Eurofighters scrambled and intercepted seven Russian Air Force aircraft over the Baltic Sea.

The Luftwaffe once again provided Baltic Air Policing at Ämari Air Base between 31 August 2020 and April 2021, having taken over from Dassault Mirage 2000-5Fs of the French Air and Space Force.

On 5 June 2024, the German chancellor announced plans to purchase another twenty Eurofighters.

German Eurofighters took part in Exercise Tarang Shakti held by the Indian Air Force from 6 August 2024.

During NATO's Steadfast Dart 26 exercise in February 2026, the German Eurofighter Typhoon and the Turkish Baykar Bayraktar TB3 conducted joint military training operations in the Baltic region. The Bayraktar TB-3 launched from the Turkish Naval Forces drone carrier TCG Anadolu to provide real-time intelligence, surveillance, target acquisition, and reconnaissance (ISTR) for the Eurofighter Typhoons using its Aselsan ASELFLIR 500 EOTS. After the Bayraktar TB-3 struck its own targets with two MAM-L precision-guided munitions, the UCAV also successfully identified simulated hostile targets for the German Eurofighter Typhoons to engage with precision strikes by the multirole fighter. Both aircraft completed manned-unmanned teaming joint missions to demonstrate successful platform integration and NATO standardization compliance.

=== Italian Air Force (Aeronautica Militare) ===
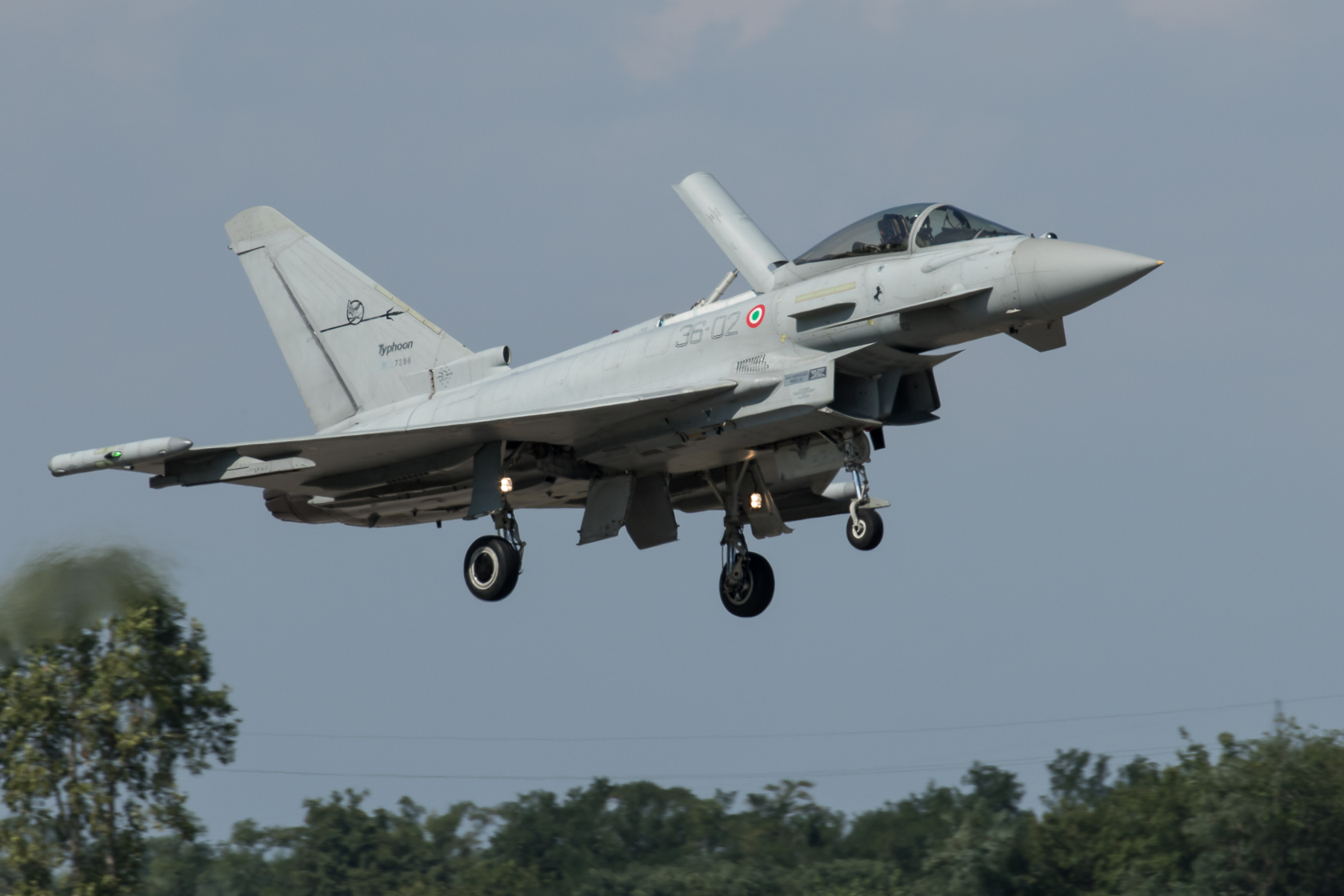
Italian F-2000A Typhoon MM7286 of 936° GEA landing at Rivolto Air Base, September 2015

On 16 December 2005, the F-2000 Typhoon reached initial operational capability (IOC) with the Italian Air Force (Aeronautica Militare). Its F-2000 Typhoons were put into service as air defence fighters at the Grosseto Air Base, and immediately assigned to QRA at the same base.

On 17 July 2009, Italian Air Force F-2000A Typhoons were deployed to protect Albania's airspace. On 29 March 2011, Italian Air Force Eurofighter Typhoons began flying combat air patrol missions in support of NATO's Operation Unified Protector in Libya.

Between January and August 2015, four Aeronautica Militare F-2000A Typhoons (from 36º and 37º Stormo) were deployed to Šiauliai Air Base in northern Lithuania as part of the Baltic Air Policing mission.

On 14 August 2026, two Italian Eurofighters launched from the Šiauliai base in Lithuania shot down a hostile drone in the Balvi region, near the Belarusian border. On 15 September 2026, two Italian Eurofighter Typhoon fighters shot down another explosive-laden drone that had entered Latvian airspace from Belarus. Initial assessments suggested a possible Russian origin, though it was hypothesized that the drone was heading toward Ukraine and had veered off course due to electronic interference caused by Belarusian jammers.

Overnight between 17–18 September 2026, an Italian Eurofighter Typhoon was damaged on the ground during an attack on the Ta’if airbase in Saudi Arabia, attributed to the Houthis, an Iranian-backed Yemeni armed group. The fighter was struck while parked at the base, and there were no injuries among Italian or Saudi personnel.

=== Kuwait Air Force ===
On 11 September 2015, Eurofighter confirmed that an agreement had been reached to supply Kuwait with 28 aircraft. On 1 March 2016, the Kuwaiti National Assembly approved the procurement of 22 single-seat and six twin-seat Typhoons. On 5 April 2016, Kuwait signed a contract with Leonardo valued at €7.957 billion ($9.062 billion) for the supply of the 28 aircraft, all to Tranche 3 standard. The Kuwaiti aircraft are to be the first Typhoons to receive the Captor-E AESA radar, with two instrumented production aircraft from the UK and Germany currently undergoing ground-based integration trials. The Typhoons are to be fitted with Leonardo's Praetorian defensive aids suite and PIRATE infrared search and track system. The contract involves the production of aircraft in Italy and covers logistics, operational support and the training of flight crews and ground personnel. It also encompasses infrastructure work at the Ali Al Salem Air Base, where the Typhoons are to be based.

Deliveries commenced in 2021, and by September 2025 Leonardo announced that the majority of the 28 aircraft ordered had been delivered and entered service. Kuwait subsequently extended its contract with Leonardo for in-service support of the Eurofighter fleet until December 2029.

=== Qatar Emiri Air Force ===
From January 2011 the Qatar Emiri Air Force (QEAF) evaluated the Typhoon, alongside the Boeing F/A-18E/F Super Hornet, the McDonnell Douglas F-15E Strike Eagle, the Dassault Rafale, and the Lockheed Martin F-35 Lightning II, to replace its then inventory of Dassault Mirage 2000-5s. On 30 April 2015 Qatar announced that it would order 24 Rafales.

In December 2017 a deal for Qatar to buy 24 jets and a support and training package from BAE was announced, scheduled to begin in 2022. In September 2018, Qatar made the first payment for the procurement of 24 Eurofighter Typhoons and nine BAE Systems Hawk aircraft to BAE.

By August 2023, BAE Systems reported that half of the Eurofighter Typhoon aircraft ordered by Qatar had been delivered to the Qatar Emiri Air Force. In October 2025, Turkish President Recep Tayyip Erdoğan announced his interest in acquiring all 24 of Qatar's used Eurofighter Typhoon Tranche 3A aircraft.

=== Royal Air Force (UK) ===
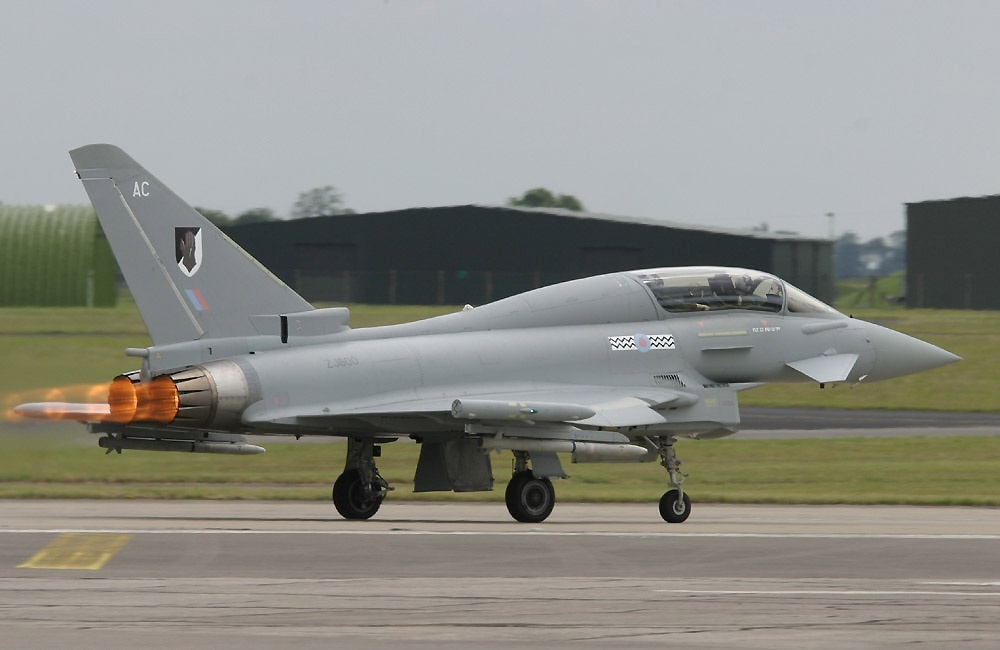
Typhoon T1 ZJ800 of No. XVII (R) Squadron at RAF Waddington, June 2004. This was the first RAF full production aircraft to fly.

The UK's first Typhoon Development Aircraft (DA-2) ZH588 made its maiden flight on 6 April 1994 from Warton. On 1 September 2002, No. XVII (Reserve) Squadron was reformed at Warton as the Typhoon Operational Evaluation Unit (TOEU), receiving its first aircraft on 18 December 2003. The first RAF production aircraft to take to the air was ZJ800 (BT001) on 14 February 2003, completing a 21-minute flight. The next Typhoon squadron to be formed was No. 29 (R) Squadron which formed as the Typhoon Operational Conversion Unit (OCU). The first operational RAF Typhoon squadron to be formed was No. 3 (Fighter) Squadron on 31 March 2006, when it moved to RAF Coningsby.

No. 3 (F) Squadron Typhoon F2s took over QRA responsibilities from the Panavia Tornado F3 on 29 June 2007, initially alternating with the Tornado F3 every month. On 9 August 2007, the UK's MoD reported that No. XI (F) Squadron of the RAF, which stood up as a Typhoon squadron on 29 March 2007, had taken delivery of its first two multi-role Typhoons. Two of No. XI (F) Squadron's Typhoons were sent to intercept a Russian Tupolev Tu-95 approaching British airspace on 17 August 2007. The RAF Typhoons were declared combat ready in the air-to-ground role by 1 July 2008. The RAF Typhoons were projected to be ready to deploy for operations by mid-2008.

In late 2009, four RAF Typhoons were deployed to RAF Mount Pleasant, replacing the Tornado F3s of No. 1435 Flight defending the Falkland Islands. No. 6 Squadron stood up at RAF Leuchars on 6 September 2010, making Leuchars the second RAF base to operate the Typhoon.

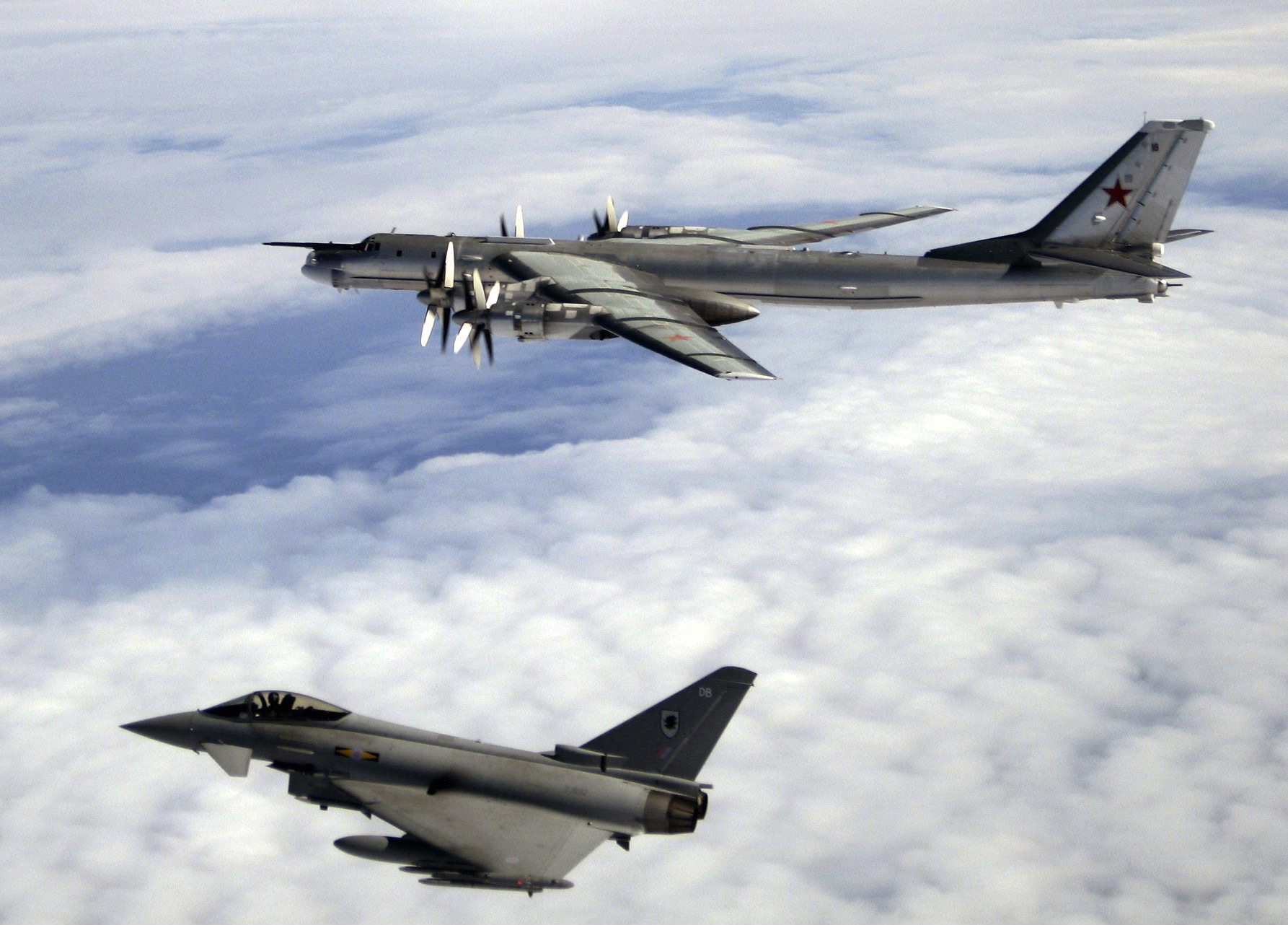
A QRA Typhoon F2 (ZJ932) of No. XI (F) Squadron escorting a Russian Tupolev Tu-95 aircraft over the North Atlantic Ocean, August 2008

On 20 March 2011 ten Typhoons from RAF Coningsby and RAF Leuchars arrived at the Gioia del Colle airbase in southern Italy to enforce a no-fly zone in Libya alongside Panavia Tornado GR4s. On 21 March, RAF Typhoons flew their first-ever combat mission while patrolling the no-fly zone. On 29 March, it was revealed that the RAF was having to divert personnel from Typhoon training to meet the shortfall in pilots available to fly the required number of sorties over Libya. On 12 April 2011, an RAF Typhoon and a Tornado GR4 dropped precision-guided bombs on ground vehicles operated by Gaddafi forces. The RAF said that each aircraft dropped one GBU-16 Paveway II 454 kg (1,000 lb) laser-guided bomb which struck "very successfully and very accurately [and this] represented] a significant milestone in the delivery of multi-role Typhoon." Target designation was provided by the Tornados with their Litening III targeting pods due to the lack of Typhoon pilots trained in air-to-ground missions.

The National Audit Office observed in 2011 that the distribution of the Eurofighter's parts supply and repairs over several countries has led to parts shortages, long timescales for repairs, and the cannibalisation of some aircraft to keep others flying. The UK's then Defence Secretary Liam Fox admitted on 14 April 2011 that Britain's Eurofighter Typhoon jets were grounded in 2010 due to shortage of spare parts. The RAF "cannibalised" aircraft for spare parts in a bid to keep the maximum number of Typhoons operational on any given day. The MoD warned that the problems were likely to continue until 2015.

On 15 September 2012, No. 1 (F) Squadron stood up at RAF Leuchars, joining No. 6 Squadron as the second Typhoon unit to operate in Scotland. On 22 April 2013, No. 41 (R) Test and Evaluation Squadron (TES) began operating the Typhoon from RAF Coningbsy.

By July 2014, a dozen RAF Tranche 2 Typhoons had been upgraded with Phase 1 Enhancement (P1E) capability to enable them to use the Paveway IV guided bomb; the Tranche 1 version had used the GBU-12 Paveway II in combat over Libya, but the Paveway IV can be set to explode above or beneath a target and to hit at a set angle.

No. II (AC) Squadron became the fifth RAF Typhoon squadron on 12 January 2015 at RAF Lossiemouth. In July 2015, it was reported that Typhoons from No. II (AC) Squadron were training with Type 45 destroyers in an Air-Maritime Integration (AMI) role, conceding that the service had recently neglected the role following the decommissioning of the Nimrod Maritime Patrol aircraft. In the 2015 Strategic Defence and Security Review (SDSR), the UK decided to retain some of the Tranche 1 aircraft to increase the number of front-line squadrons from five to seven and to extend the out-of-service date from 2030 to 2040 as well as implementing the Captor-E AESA radar in later tranches. In 2015, Typhoons were deployed to Malta as security for the Commonwealth Heads of Government Meeting. On 3 December 2015, six Typhoon FGR4s deployed to RAF Akrotiri to support operations against ISIL. The following evening the Typhoons, accompanied by Tornados, attacked targets in Syria.

In October 2016, four Typhoon FGR4s from No. II (AC) Squadron, supported by an Airbus Voyager KC3 aerial tanker and a Boeing C-17 Globemaster III, deployed to Misawa Air Base in Japan for the first bilateral exercises with non-US forces hosted by the JASDF.

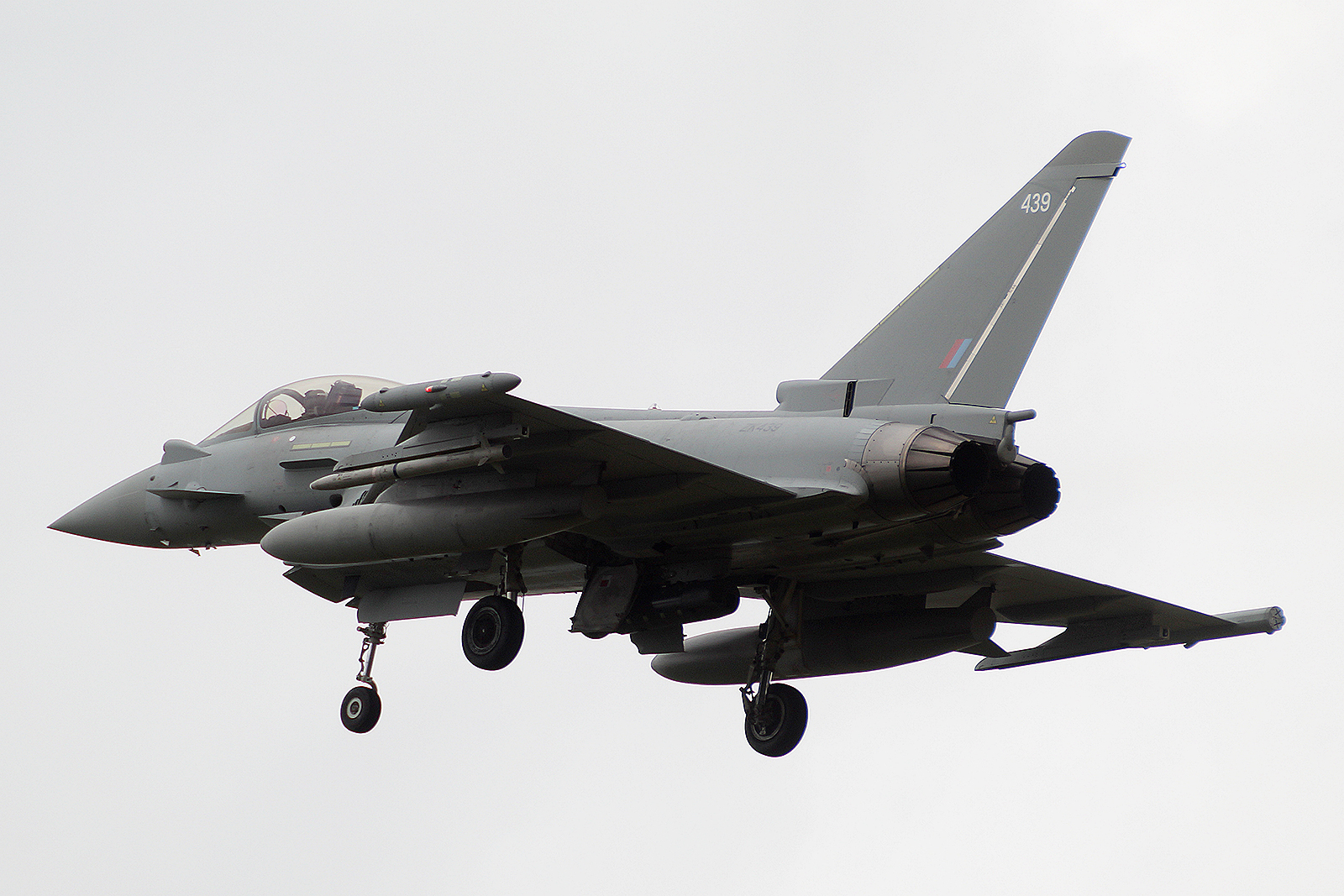
Typhoon FGR4 ZK439 on approach to RAF Marham, May 2020. This was the penultimate Typhoon to be delivered to the RAF.

On 14 December 2017, it was announced No. 12 (B) Squadron would stand as a joint RAF/Qatari Air Force squadron, with the Qatari crew temporarily operating Typhoons to prepare them for their own Typhoon deliveries in 2022. On 29 January 2018, the RAF announced that 16 twin-seat Typhoons would undergo the Return to Produce (RTP) process in an effort to save £800 million, with each airframe producing £50M of spare parts. This move also reflected the switch from two-seat trainer to single-seat pilot training and greater use of training simulators. In addition, the two-seat airframes were primarily from Tranche 1 and could not be equipped with Tranche 3 and later upgrades such as Captor-E.

On 1 April 2019, No. IX (B) Squadron officially converted from the Tornado GR4 to the Typhoon FGR4, becoming an aggressor and air defence squadron at Lossiemouth. In April, four Typhoons of No. XI (F) Squadron deployed from RAF Coningsby to Ämari Airbase, Estonia, to undergo a four-month long NATO Baltic policing mission (Op AZOTIZE). Five Typhoons of No. 6 Squadron participated in the Arctic Challenge Exercise (ACE) in Sweden from 22 May to 4 June. No. 12 Squadron were assigned their first Typhoon FGR4 in July 2019. The 160th, and last, Typhoon (ZK437) was delivered to the RAF on 27 September 2019. Between November and December 2019, No. 1(F) Squadron deployed to Keflavik Airbase in Iceland as part of NATO's Icelandic Air Policing Mission. During this one-month deployment the aircraft conducted more than 180 practice intercepts and 59 training sorties.

Between April and September 2020, No. 6 Squadron deployed to Šiauliai Air Base, Lithuania, as part of Operation Azotize. While deployed the squadron participated in Exercise BALTOPs 2020. In July 2020, No. 12 Squadron began operating as a joint RAF-QEAF unit at RAF Coningsby.

On 22 March 2021 the 2021 Defence Command Paper announced the retirement of all Tranche 1 Typhoons by 2025, with the remaining fleet being upgraded. Also in 2021 the UK launched the P3Ec package, due for delivery in 2024, including several upgrades, including replacing the multifunction displays with a Large Area Display (LAD). On 14 December 2021 the RAF executed its first operational air-to-air engagement with a Typhoon, shooting down a small hostile drone with an ASRAAM near the Al-Tanf coalition base in Syria.

On 7 September 2022 during the joint UK/US SinkEx 'Atlantic Thunder' a 41 Squadron Typhoon successfully hit the ex-USS Boone with Paveway IVs, becoming the first RAF Typhoon to strike a naval target with live ordnance.

Between 18 and 22 September 2023, Typhoons from 41 Squadron took part in the Finnish led Exercise ‘Baana 23’. During this exercise, the aircraft performed landings and takeoffs from a highway in Tervo, marking a first for any Eurofighter operator.

On 12 January 2024, at 2:30 am local time, four RAF Typhoons dropped Paveway IV bombs on two military facilities, used by Houthis to launch drone and missile strikes on ships in the Red Sea, as a part of the 2024 Yemeni airstrike. On 13 April 2024, RAF Typhoons shot down an unspecified number of unmanned aerial vehicles (UAVs) during the 2024 Iranian strikes in Israel. The Typhoons, based in Cyprus and Romania, were operating in Iraqi and Syrian airspace as part of Operation Shader.

On 1 March 2026, an RAF Typhoon of 12 Squadron operating from Qatar, shot down an Iranian UAV that was approaching Qatari airspace. In May 2026, the RAF Typhoon was equipped with the US developed Advanced Precision Kill Weapon System (APKWS) to shoot down UAVs more cheaply, and fielded in the Middle East.

=== Royal Air Force of Oman ===
During the 2008 Farnborough Airshow it was announced that Oman was in an "advanced stage" of discussions to order Typhoons as a replacement for its SEPECAT Jaguar aircraft. On 21 December 2012, the Royal Air Force of Oman (RAFO) became the Typhoon's seventh customer when BAE and Oman announced an order for 12 Typhoons to enter service in 2017. The first of the Typhoons (plus Hawk Mk 166) ordered by Oman were "formally presented to the customer" on 15 May 2017. This included a flypast by an RAFO Typhoon.

=== Royal Saudi Air Force ===
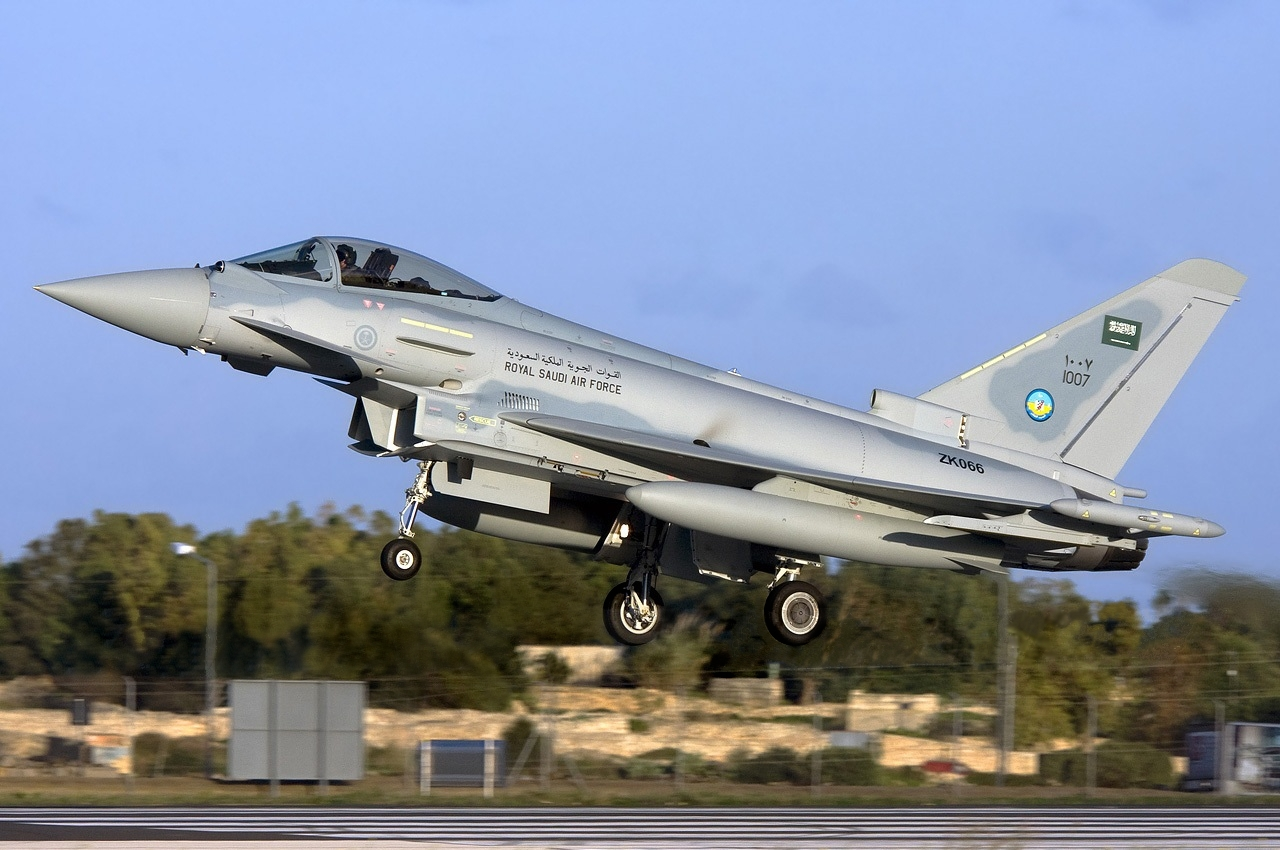
RSAF Typhoon 1007 on a delivery flight passing through Malta International Airport, December 2009

In August 2006, Saudi Arabia confirmed it had agreed to purchase 72 Typhoons for the Royal Saudi Air Force (RSAF). In December 2006, it was reported in The Guardian that Saudi Arabia had threatened to buy Rafales because of a UK Serious Fraud Office (SFO) investigation into the Al Yamamah defence deals which commenced in the 1980s.

On 14 December 2006, Britain's attorney general, Lord Goldsmith, ordered that the SFO discontinue its investigation into BAE Systems' alleged bribery of senior Saudi officials in the Al-Yamamah contracts, citing "the need to safeguard national and international security". The Times raised the possibility that RAF production aircraft would be diverted as early Saudi Arabian aircraft, with the RAF forced to wait for its full complement of aircraft. This arrangement would mirror the diversion of RAF Tornados to the RSAF. The Times also reported that such an arrangement would make the UK purchase of its Tranche 3 commitments more likely. On 17 September 2007, Saudi Arabia confirmed it had signed a £4.43 billion contract for 72 aircraft. 24 aircraft would be at the Tranche 2 build standard, previously destined for the UK RAF, the first being delivered in 2008. The remaining 48 aircraft were to be assembled in Saudi Arabia and delivered from 2011, however following contract renegotiations in 2011, it was agreed that all 72 aircraft would be assembled by BAE Systems in the UK, with the last 24 aircraft being built to Tranche 3 capability.

On 29 September 2008, the United States Department of State approved the Typhoon sale, required because of a certain technology governed by the International Traffic in Arms Regulations (ITAR) process which was incorporated into the MIDS of the Eurofighter.

On 22 October 2008, the first RSAF Typhoon made its maiden flight at Warton. Since 2010, BAE has been training Saudi Arabian personnel at Warton.

By 2011, 24 Tranche 2 Eurofighter Typhoons had been delivered to Saudi Arabia, consisting of 18 single-seat and six two-seat aircraft. After that, BAE and Riyadh entered into discussions over configurations and price of the rest of the 72-plane order. On 19 February 2014, BAE announced that the Saudis had agreed to a price increase. BAE announced that the last of the original 72 Typhoons had been delivered to Saudi Arabia in June 2017.

RSAF Typhoons are playing a central role in the Saudi-led bombing campaign in Yemen. In February 2015, Saudi Typhoons attacked ISIS targets over Syria using Paveway IV bombs for the first time.

On 9 March 2018, a memorandum of intent for the additional 48 Typhoons was signed during Saudi Crown Prince Mohammed bin Salman's visit to the United Kingdom, however the deal has not been completed due to German arms sanctions implemented in November 2018 in response to the assassination of Jamal Khashoggi.

=== Spanish Air and Space Force ===
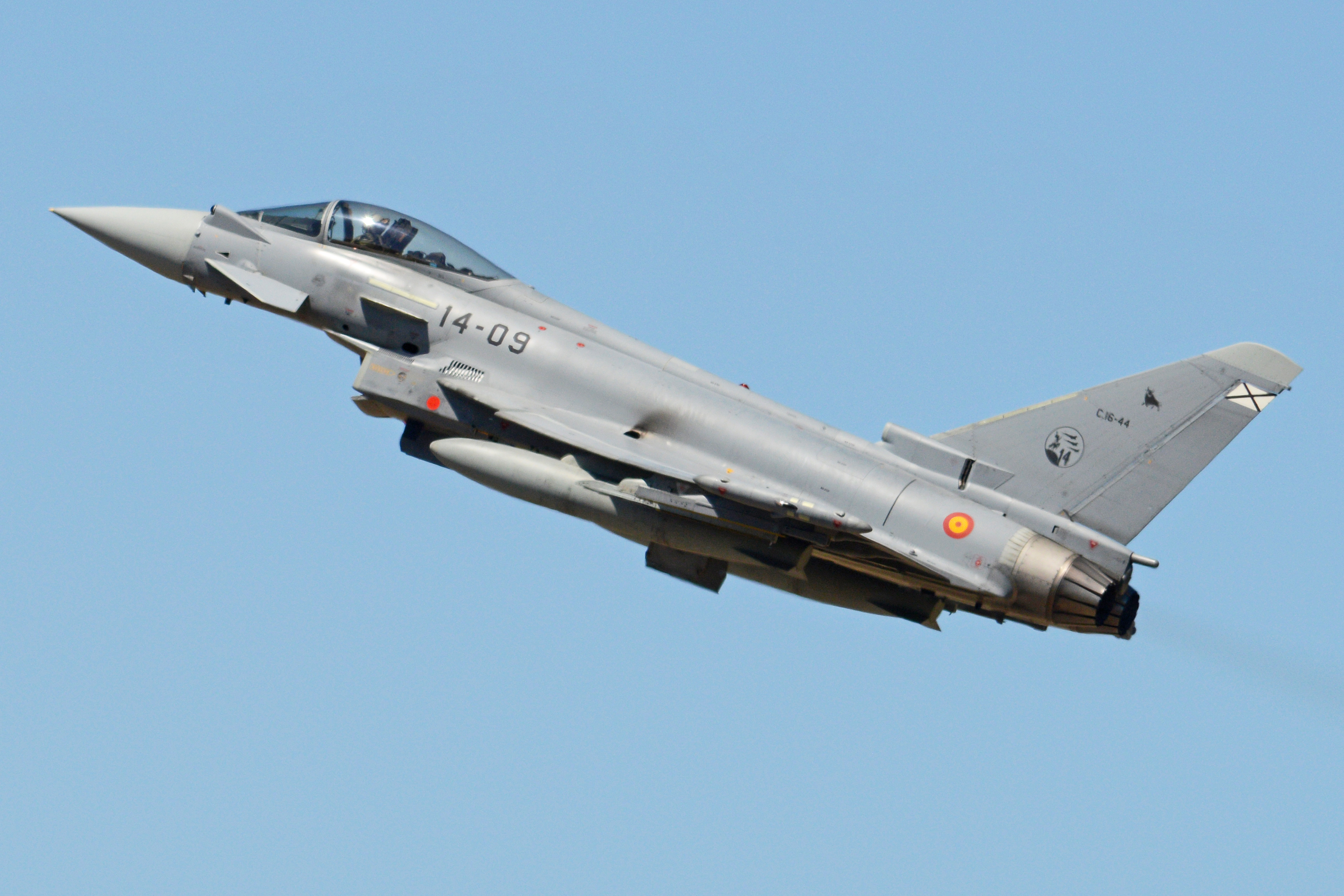
Spanish Eurofighter Tifón C.16–44 of 142 Escuadrón, May 2016

The first Spanish production Eurofighter Tifón to fly was CE.16-01 (ST001) on 17 February 2003, flying from Getafe Air Base. The Spanish Air and Space Force assigned their Typhoons to QRA responsibilities in July 2008.

On 7 August 2018, a Spanish Air and Space Force Typhoon, on a training exercise near Otepää in Estonia, released an AMRAAM missile by mistake. There were no casualties, but the ten-day search operation for missile remains was unsuccessful and the status of the missile is unknown, whether it self-destructed in the air or landed unexploded and left a hazardous situation for the public. The pilot was disciplined for negligence, but received only the minimum penalty in the light of undisclosed mitigating circumstances.

== Sales and marketing ==
=== Germany ===
Germany placed an order for an additional 38 Tranche 4 Typhoons on 11 November 2020 under the Quadriga Agreement. The aircraft are due to replace Tranche 1 aircraft currently in service, with the first airframe being announced as in production in November 2022. Deliveries are due to take place from 2025.

In March 2022, the German government announced the decision to purchase Typhoon EK over the Boeing EA-18G Growler to replace the ageing Tornado ECR variant from 2030. On 30 November 2023, the Budget Committee of the Bundestag formally announced the plans to convert 15 Typhoons to Electronic Warfare standard.

On 5 June 2024, it was announced that an additional 20 Typhoons would be ordered on top of the 38 already on order. This order was approved in October 2025.

=== Italy ===
On 23 December 2024, an order worth €7.5 billion was placed for 24 aircraft.

=== Spain ===
The Spanish Air and Space Force has a requirement for a further 45 Typhoons split across two contracts.

Halcon I was signed in June 2022 for the purchase of 20 aircraft will begin deliveries from 2026. The contract is for 16 single-seat and four twin-seat airframes, all at Tranche 4 standard. These aircraft are expected to replace the EF-18 Hornets of Ala 46, based at Gando Air Base on the Canary Islands.

Halcon II followed on 12 September 2023 for the acquirement of a further 25 Typhoons. These aircraft will replace the rest of the EF-18 Hornet fleet which is due to be decommissioned in 2030. The Spanish Government announced that these aircraft would be of Tranche 5 configuration.

=== Saudi Arabia ===
In October 2016, it was reported that BAE Systems was in talks with Saudi Arabia over an order for another 48 aircraft. On 9 March 2018, a memorandum of intent for the additional 48 Typhoons was signed during Saudi Crown Prince Mohammed bin Salman's visit to the United Kingdom.

In January 2024, the German government announced that it would no longer block the sale of 48 Typhoons to Saudi Arabia. As of February 2024, there has been no official confirmation that the sale will go ahead as other aircraft have been considered to strengthen the Royal Saudi Air Force's combat fleet.

=== Egypt ===
In January 2023, reports surfaced that Egypt would acquire 24 Typhoons as part of a wider $10–12 billion arms package from Italy.

=== Turkey ===
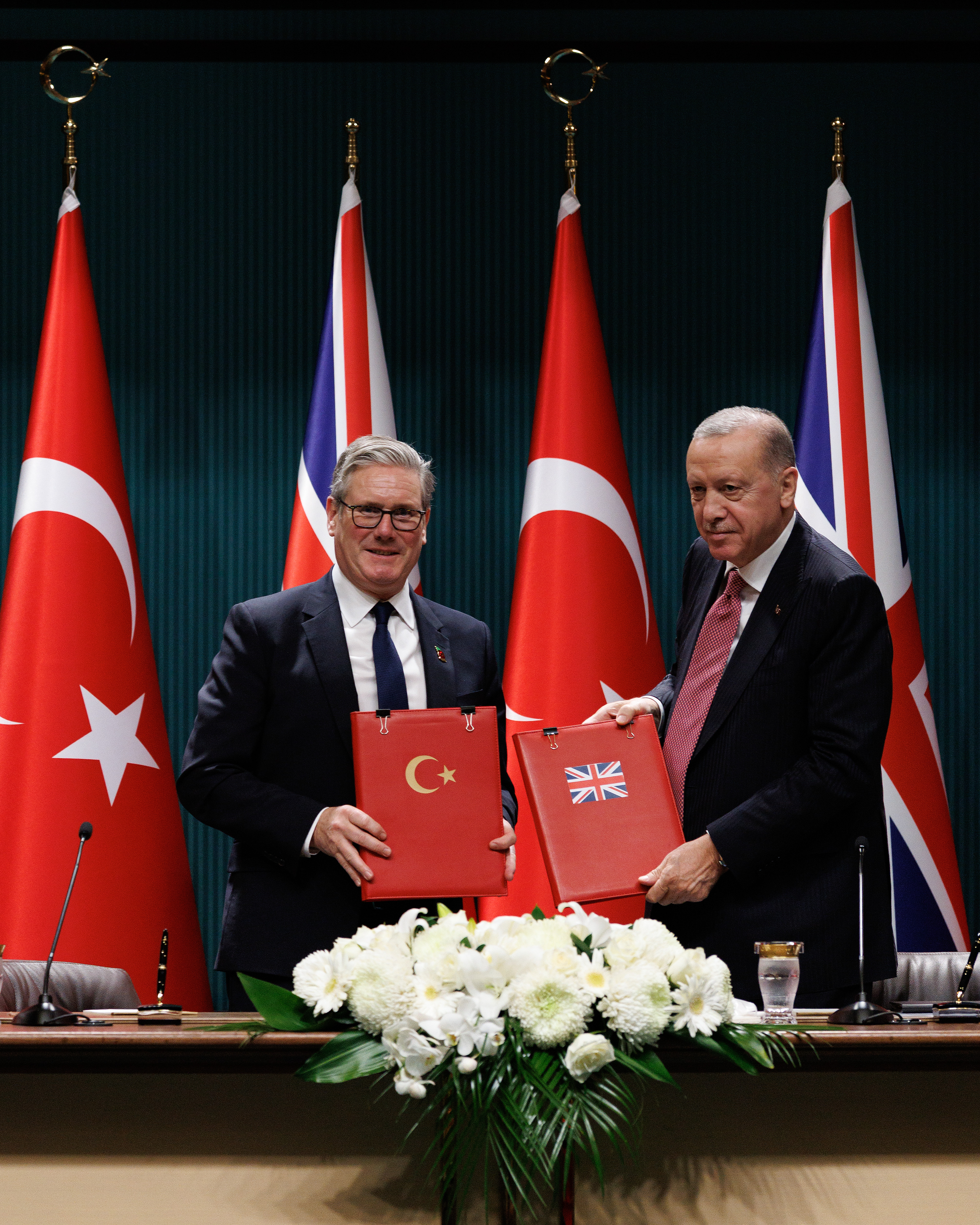
British Prime Minister Starmer and Turkish President Erdoğan in Ankara, October 2025

Although the jets were initially offered back in 2006, including a local assembly offer, Turkish Air Force opted to join the F-35 development. Germany initially blocked the sale of aircraft to Turkey, but in 2024, Scholz approved the potential sale of 40 Eurofighters (ECRS Mk2) to Turkey. According to the Turkish Presidency's Directorate of Communications, the agreement also includes an option for 20 additional aircraft.

An agreement was signed in October 2025 to purchase 20 fighters from the UK for £8 billion, including infrastructure, maintenance and systems. Of which, £5.4 billion for the aircraft and munitions. Furthermore, 24 additional second-hand units are to be acquired from Qatar and Oman.

=== Bangladesh ===
Bangladesh signed a Letter of Intent with Leonardo to begin talks in regards to the purchase of an unknown number of Eurofighter Typhoons to modernise the Bangladesh Air Force (BAF).

=== Others ===
Other countries have expressed interest in the fighter, including Poland, Colombia, Ukraine, and the Philippines.

Bangladesh signed a Letter of Intent (LoI) with Leonardo for Italy's used Eurofighter Typhoons to the Bangladesh Air Force.

=== Failed bids ===
The following countries have formally eliminated the Typhoon from their fighter programs: Belgium, Denmark, Singapore, South Korea, Switzerland, India, Croatia, Serbia,and Finland.

== Variants ==
The Eurofighter is produced in single-seat and twin-seat variants. The twin-seat variant is used for training, though it is combat capable.

The Tranche 1 aircraft were produced from 2000 onwards. Aircraft capabilities are being increased incrementally, with each software upgrade resulting in a different standard, known as blocks and also Enhanced Operational Capability (EOS) segments. The latest variant is Tranche 5 which is equipped with sophisticated avionics, electronic warfare suite and weapon integrations.

The aircraft prototypes were manufactured in three major standards; Development Aircraft (DA), Instrumented Production Aircraft (IPA) for further system development, and a Series Production Aircraft.

== Operators ==
=== Summary ===
Operators	Eurofighter Typhoon Orders						Eurofighter Typhoon Deliveries						Losses	Retired	In service	Notes
Operators	Tranche 1	Tranche 2	Tranche 3 / 3A	Tranche 4	Tranche 5	Total	Tranche 1	Tranche 2	Tranche 3 / 3A	Tranche 4	Tranche 5	Total	Losses	Retired	In service	Notes
Austria	15	–	–	–	–	15	15	–	–	–	–	15	0	0	15	
Germany	33	79	31	38	20	201	33 (0 / -2)	79 (−2 / -1)	31	0 +38	0 +20	143	-2	-3	138	
Italy	28	47	21	–	24	120	28 (−27) (−1 / 0)	47 (−1 / 0)	21 (−1 / 0)	–	0 +24	96	-3	0	93	
Kuwait	–	–	28	–	–	28	–	–	15 (+13)	–	–	15	0	0	15	
Oman	–	–	12	–	–	12	–	–	12	–	–	12	0	0	12	
Qatar	–	–	24	12	–	36	–	–	22 (+2)	0 +12	–	22	0	0	22	
Saudi Arabia	–	48	24	–	–	72	–	48 (−1 / 0)	24	–	–	72	-1	0	71	
Spain	19	34	20	20	25	118	19 (−2 / 0)	34 (−2 / 0)	20	0 +20	0 +25	73	-4	0	69	
Turkey	–	–	–	-	20+20	20	–	–	–	–	0 +20	0	0	0	0	
United Kingdom	53	67	40	–	–	160	53 (−53) (−1 / -48)	67	40	–	–	160	-1	-48	111	
TOTAL	148	275	200	70	89	782	148	275	185	0	0	608	-11	-51	546	

To be delivered
To be retired
Losses / retired

=== Current operators ===
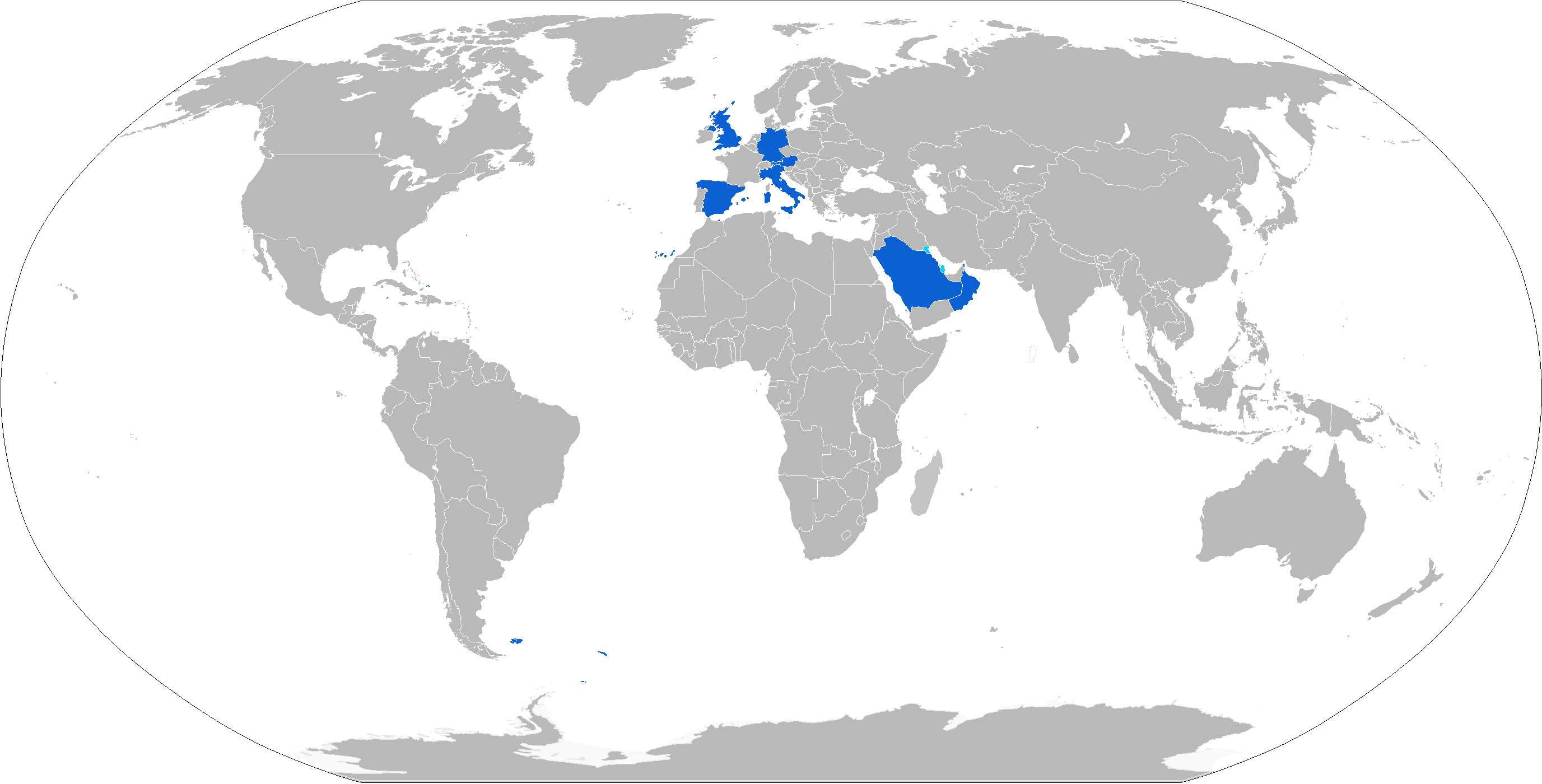
Eurofighter Typhoon operators in blue with orders in cyan

Austria

- Austrian Air Force – 15 delivered.
  - Zeltweg Air Base
    - Überwachungsgeschwader

Germany

- German Air Force – 143 ordered, and all delivered. As of 14 March 2025, 138 are in service. 38 Tranche 4 aircraft on order under Project Quadriga. 15 Aircraft to be upgraded to Typhoon EW (Electronic Warfare) standard. An additional 20 aircraft of the Tranche 5 were ordered in October 2025.
  - Nörvenich Air Base
    - Taktisches Luftwaffengeschwader 31 "Boelcke", 311 & 312 Staffel at
  - Wittmundhafen Air Base
    - Taktisches Luftwaffengeschwader 71 "Richthofen", 711 Staffel
  - Laage Air Base
    - Taktisches Luftwaffengeschwader 73 "Steinhoff", 731 & 732 Staffel. (OCU formation)
  - Neuburg Air Base
    - Taktisches Luftwaffengeschwader 74, 741 & 742 Staffel
  - Ingolstadt Manching Airport
    - Wehrtechnische Dienststelle 61

Italy

- Italian Air Force – 96 ordered with 96 delivered and 93 in operation as of August 2024. An additional 24 aircraft were ordered on 23 December 2024 for €7.5 billion.
  - Grosseto Air Base, 4º Stormo "Amedeo d'Aosta" (4th Wing)
    - 9° Gruppo Caccia (9th Fighter Squadron)
    - 20° Gruppo OCU Caccia (20th Fighter Operational Conversion Squadron)
  - Gioia del Colle Air Base, 36° Stormo "Riccardo Hellmuth Seidl" (36th Wing)
    - 10° Gruppo Caccia (10th Fighter Squadron)
    - 12° Gruppo Caccia (12th Fighter Squadron)
  - Trapani Air Base, 37° Stormo "Cesare Toschi" (37th Wing)
    - 18° Gruppo Caccia (18th Fighter Squadron)
  - Istrana Air Base, 51° Stormo "Ferruccio Serafini" (51st Wing)
    - 132° Gruppo Caccia (132nd Fighter Squadron)
  - Pratica di Mare Air Base, Reparto Sperimentale Volo

Kuwait

- Kuwait Air Force – 28 ordered with 15 delivered as of 31 March 2024.
  - Ali Al Salem AB, Al Jahra District
    - 7 Squadron
    - 18 Squadron

Oman

- Royal Air Force of Oman – 12 ordered in December 2012 with all delivered by June 2018.
  - RAFO Adam, Ad Dakhiliyah
    - No.8 Squadron

Qatar

- Qatar Emiri Air Force – 24 ordered, 10 delivered as of March 2023.
  - Tamim Airbase, Dukhan
    - 7 Squadron
    - 12 Squadron
  - RAF Coningsby, Lincolnshire, United Kingdom (from July 2020)
    - No. 12 Squadron RAF, joint RAF/Qatar Emiri Air Force squadron

Saudi Arabia

- Royal Saudi Air Force – 71 aircraft in operation as of June 2018 from 72 delivered.
  - King Fahad Air Base, Taif
    - No. 3 Squadron
    - No. 10 Squadron
    - No. 80 Squadron

Spain

- Spanish Air and Space Force – 73 ordered, all of which have been delivered by October 2020 with 70 in operation as of August 2020. A further 20 aircraft were ordered as of 13 September 2023. On 20 December 2024, the Spanish government has signed a contract with Munich-based, Germany, NATO Eurofighter and Tornado Management Agency (NETMA) for the acquisition of additional 25 Eurofighter aircraft known as the Halcon II programme.
  - Seville-Morón Air Base, Ala 11
    - 111 Escuadrón
    - 113 Escuadrón, OCU Tactical pilot training and evaluation
  - Albacete-Los Llanos Air Base, Ala 14
    - 142 Escuadrón
  - Past Units
    - Armament and Experimentation Logistics Center

United Kingdom

- Royal Air Force – 160 ordered, all of which had been delivered by September 2019. As of 21 August 2023, the RAF has 137 aircraft, with 102 in service.
  - RAF Coningsby, Lincolnshire, England
    - No. 3 (F) Squadron
    - No. XI (F) Squadron
    - No. 12 Squadron, joint RAF/Qatar Air Force squadron
    - No. 29 Squadron, OCU Tactical pilot training and evaluation – Typhoon Display Team – Taken from No. 29 Squadron
    - No. 41 Test and Evaluation Squadron
  - RAF Lossiemouth, Moray, Scotland
    - No. 1 (F) Squadron
    - No. II (AC) Squadron
    - No. 6 Squadron
    - No. IX (B) Squadron
  - RAF Mount Pleasant, East Falkland, Falkland Islands
    - No. 1435 Flight
  - Past Units
    - No. 17 (R) Test & Evaluation Squadron, Operational Evaluation Unit (operated between 2003 and 2013)

=== Future operators ===
Turkey

- Turkish Air Force: Turkey has revised its Eurofighter Typhoon Tranche 5 ECRS Mk2 acquisition and training plan, with the Turkish Air Forces Command updating its strategy to establish the first two squadrons using 56 jets from multiple sources within the next three to four years. First deliveries from Qatar and Oman will start 2026. Deliveries from UK are to start after 2030.

== Accidents ==
- On 21 November 2002, the Spanish twin-seat Typhoon prototype DA-6 crashed due to a double engine flameout caused by surges of the two engines at 45,000 ft. The two crew members escaped unhurt and the aircraft crashed in a military test range near Toledo, some 110 kilometres (68 mi) from its base at Getafe Air Base.
- On 23 April 2008, an RAF Typhoon FGR4 from 17 Squadron at RAF Coningsby (ZJ943), made a wheels–up landing at the US Navy's NAWS China Lake, in the United States. The aircraft was severely damaged, however the pilot from 17 Squadron did not sustain any significant injury. It is thought the pilot may have forgotten to deploy the undercarriage or that for some reason he was not alerted to the undercarriage having not been deployed.
- On 24 August 2010, a Spanish twin-seat Typhoon crashed at Spain's Morón Air Base moments after take-off for a routine training flight. It was being piloted by an RSAF pilot, who was killed, and a Spanish Air Force Major, who ejected safely. In September 2010 the German Air Force grounded its 55 planes and the RAF temporarily grounded all Typhoon training flights amidst concerns that after ejecting successfully the pilot had fallen to his death. On 21 September, the RAF announced that the harness system had been sufficiently modified to enable routine flying from RAF Coningsby. The Austrian Air Force also said all its aircraft had been cleared for flight. On 24 August 2010, the ejection seat manufacturer Martin Baker commented: "... under certain conditions, the quick release fitting could be unlocked using the palm of the hand, rather than the thumb and fingers, and that this posed a risk of inadvertent release", adding that a modification had been rapidly developed and approved "to eliminate this risk" and was being fitted to all Typhoon seats.
- On 9 June 2014, the Spanish Air Force announced that a Typhoon had crashed at Spain's Morón Air Base on landing after a routine training flight. The sole pilot, Captain Fernando Lluna Carrascosa of the Spanish Air Force, who had over 600 Eurofighter flying hours, died in the crash.
- On 23 June 2014, a Typhoon of the German Air Force suffered a mid-air collision with a Learjet 35A, which crashed near Olsberg, Germany. The severely damaged Eurofighter made a safe landing at Nörvenich Air Base, while the Learjet crashed with the two onboard killed.
- On 1 September 2017, an RAF Typhoon overran the runway on landing at Pardubice Airport, Czech Republic, after diverting for bad weather.
- On 14 September 2017, an RSAF aircraft crashed on a combat mission in Yemen's Abhyan province, killing its pilot. According to the Saudi Government, the aircraft crashed due to technical reasons.
- On 24 September 2017, an Italian Air Force aircraft crashed during an airshow in Terracina, Lazio, Italy. The pilot did not eject and died in the accident. The Italian Air Force said the jet completed a loop but then failed to get enough lift as it approached sea level and hit the water just a few hundred metres offshore.
- On 12 October 2017, a Spanish Air Force Typhoon crashed near its base at Los Llanos Albacete, Spain, when returning from the military parade for the Spanish National Day. The pilot was killed.
- On 24 June 2019, two German Air Force aircraft collided mid-air during an exercise in the region of Müritz in Mecklenburg-Vorpommern in northern Germany. Both aircraft were lost while the pilots ejected. The two planes were based at Laage, home to the "Steinhoff" Tactical Air Force Wing 73. Neither plane was carrying weapons. One of the pilots died.
- On 14 December 2022, an Italian Air Force Typhoon of 37° Stormo crashed during the landing sequence into Trapani-Birgi Air Base in Sicily. The aircraft had been conducting a training mission with another Typhoon which landed safely. The pilot was killed during the crash.
- On 24 July 2024, an Italian Air Force Typhoon crashed during a military training exercise in the Douglas Daly region of the Northern Territory, Australia, during Exercise Pitch Black. The pilot ejected safely and was taken to Royal Darwin Hospital by helicopter.

== Surviving aircraft ==
Germany

- '98+29' – Eurofighter prototype DA1, on public display at the Deutsches Museum Flugwerft Schleissheim in Oberschleißheim, Munich.
- '98+30' – Eurofighter prototype DA5, was on public display at the Militärhistorisches Museum Flugplatz Berlin-Gatow, now currently stored, Berlin-Gatow.
- '30+39' – Eurofighter (manufacturers serial number GS0025), on public display at the General-Steinhoff-Kaserne in Gatow, Berlin.

Italy

- 'MMX602' – Typhoon prototype DA3, on public display at Leonardo Factory Museum, Caselle.
- 'MMX603' – Typhoon prototype DA7, on public display at the Italian Air Force Museum, located on the former Vigna di Valle Air Base in Bracciano.

United Kingdom

- 'ZH588' – Typhoon prototype DA2, on public display at the Royal Air Force Museum London in Hendon, north London.
- 'ZH590' - Typhoon(T) prototype DA4, was on public display at the Imperial War Museum Duxford, Cambridge, England, in Hangar 3: Air and Sea; it was due to be transferred to the Newark Air Museum in 2020, instead it was moved to the Defence College of Aeronautical Engineering (DCAE) at RAF Cosford, after the MOD made the decision to use it as an instructional airframe.

== Specifications ==
Eurofighter Typhoon drawings

Data from RAF Typhoon data, Air Forces Monthly, Superfighters, and Brassey's Modern Fighters

General characteristics

- Crew: 1 or 2
- Length: 15.96 m (52 ft 4 in)
- Wingspan: 10.95 m (35 ft 11 in)
- Height: 5.28 m (17 ft 4 in)
- Wing area: 51.2 m^{2} (551 sq ft)
- Empty weight: 11,000 kg (24,251 lb)
- Gross weight: 16,000 kg (35,274 lb)
- Max takeoff weight: 23,500 kg (51,809 lb)
- Fuel capacity: Internal 4,500 kg (9,900 lb) (approx), including external stores 7,600 kg (16,800 lb).
- Powerplant: 2 × Eurojet EJ200 afterburning turbofan engines, 60 kN (13,500 lbf) thrust each dry, 90 kN (20,200 lbf) with afterburner

Performance

- Maximum speed: 2,495 km/h (1,550 mph, 1,347 kn) at 11 km altitude — or Mach 2.35
  - 1,530 km/h (950 mph; 830 kn) at sea level — or Mach 1.25
  - Supercruise: Mach 1.5
- Range: 2,900 km (1,800 mi, 1,600 nmi)
- Combat range: 1,389 km (863 mi, 750 nmi) ground attack, hi-lo-hi
  - 601 km (325 nmi; 373 mi) ground attack, lo-lo-lo
- Ferry range: 3,790 km (2,350 mi, 2,050 nmi) with 3 × drop tanks
- Endurance: 3 hours combat air patrol (air defence) at 185 km (100 nmi; 115 mi)
  - 10 minutes air-defence loiter at 1,389 km (750 nmi; 863 mi)
- Service ceiling: 16,764 m (55,000 ft)
- Max flight altitude: 20,000 m (65,000 ft)
- g limits: +9 / -3
- Rate of climb: 315 m/s (62,000 ft/min)
- Wing loading: 312 kg/m^{2} (64 lb/sq ft)
- Thrust/weight: 1.15 (interceptor configuration)
- Brakes-off to Take-off acceleration: <8 s
- Brakes-off to supersonic acceleration: <30 s
- Brakes-off to Mach 1.6 at 11,000 m (36,000 ft): <150 s (Note: Air superiority configuration.)

Armament

- Guns: 1 × 27 mm Mauser BK-27 revolver cannon with 150 rounds
- Hardpoints: Total of 13: 8 × under-wing; and 5 × under-fuselage pylon stations; holding in excess of 9,000 kg (19,800 lb) of payload
  Typical multi-role configuration for a Tranche 2-P1E would be 4 × AMRAAM, 2×ASRAAM/IRIS-T, 4 × EGBU-16/Paveway-IV, 2 × 1000-litre supersonic fuel tanks and a targeting pod.
- Rockets:
  - LAU-131 rocket pod (each with 7 × Hydra 70 APKWS rockets)
- Missiles:
  - Air-to-air missiles:
    - AIM-120 AMRAAM
    - MBDA Meteor
    - IRIS-T
    - AIM-132 ASRAAM
    - AIM-9 Sidewinder
    - Advanced Precision Kill Weapon System
  - Air-to-surface missiles:
    - Storm Shadow/Scalp EG
    - Brimstone
    - AGM-88 HARM
    - Taurus KEPD 350
    - SPEAR 3 (in progress)
  - Anti-ship missiles:
    - Marte ER (up to 6 Marte ER anti-ship missiles at 6 hardpoints)
- Bombs:
  - Paveway II/III/Enhanced Paveway series of laser-guided bombs (LGBs)
  - 500-lb Paveway IV
  - Small Diameter Bomb (planned for P2E)
  - Joint Direct Attack Munition (JDAM), work started in 2018
  - HOPE/HOSBO, in the future
  - Spice 250
- Others:
  - Up to 3 × 1000L drop tanks for ferry flight or extended range/loitering time
  - Conformal fuel tanks on Tranche 3 or later

Avionics

- Euroradar CAPTOR:
  - Captor-M: Solid-state, mechanically scanned array radar
  - European Common Radar System (ECRS) Mk0: Active electronically scanned array (AESA) radar developed by the original four Eurofighter consortium members. Commonly referred to as the Captor-E. Fitted to Qatari and Kuwaiti Eurofighters.
  - ECRS Mk1: Upgraded Mk0, manufactured by Hendsoldt and Airbus. To be fitted to existing German and Spanish Eurofighters.
  - ECRS Mk2: New (AESA) radar with additional electronic warfare capabilities. Manufactured in Edinburgh by Leonardo UK. To be fitted to existing Tranche 3 UK Eurofighters.
- Passive Infra-Red Airborne Tracking Equipment (PIRATE)
- Praetorian DASS
- Damocles (targeting pod)
- LITENING III laser targeting pod (LITENING 5 in RAF and Luftwaffe testing)
- Sniper Advanced Targeting Pod

== See also ==
- Timeline of the Eurofighter Typhoon
- Fourth-generation jet fighter

Related development

- British Aerospace EAP

Related lists

- List of active United Kingdom military aircraft
- List of aircraft of the Royal Air Force
- List of military aircraft of Germany
- List of active Italian military aircraft
- List of megaprojects, Aerospace
