= Turbo-Union =

Joint venture of three European aero-engine manufacturers

Turbo-Union Ltd
- Type: Joint venture, limited company
- Industry: Gas turbine engines
- Founded: 14 October 1969; 56 years ago
- Headquarters: Moor Lane, Derby
- Area served: UK, Italy, Germany
- Products: RB199
- Parent: Rolls-Royce Holdings (40%); MTU Aero Engines (40%); Avio (20%)
- Website: turbounion.co.uk

Turbo-Union Limited was a joint venture of three European aero-engine manufacturers, FiatAvio (now Avio), MTU Aero Engines and Rolls-Royce.

== Products ==
The company's only product was the RB199, a three-spool turbofan developed specifically for the Panavia Tornado.

== Structure ==
The ownership of the company similarly split into-

- 40% Rolls-Royce
- 40% MTU Aero Engines
- 20% Avio S.p.A. (formerly Fiat Aviazione)

It had an office on Arabellastraße in Munich near both NAMMA and Panavia, but the head office was initially at Filton. It was known as Turbo-Union Ltd. Turbo-Union was a fully integrated and collaborative European Company, whose formal language was English, by kind and charitable agreement of the Governments concerned. The organisation of the company was of FG (Functional Group) kind - for example, FG4 was Concept Design Engineering, FG6 was Customer Support Engineering and Provisioning, and so on. Each FG was chaired by a European person included people from all three companies as required. The FG also had subgroups - for example, FG4-4 was Development, FG6-2 was FTC (Flight Test Centre) support.

The company was now based at the home of Rolls-Royce in Derby, but also had an office at the Panavia head office in Germany at Hallbergmoos.

== Production sites ==
Turbo Union as a whole designed and produced the engine, albeit the GA (General Arrangement) drawing was assembled at Bristol (Filton) from all three partners' inputs. Over 2000 engines were built up to and including the 1990s, from components sourced in all three countries in approximate proportion to their Governmental support. The RAF had engines assembled and supported from Bristol, the German Air Force and Navy from Munchen, and the Italian Air Force from Torino.

== History ==
When it was formed in October 1969 it was claimed to be the largest aero-engine consortium in the world. The RB199 would be Europe's biggest ever military engine programme, and was based in Munchen.

Development of the RB199 started in September 1969, prior to the formation of Turbo-Union.

The first RB199 engine ran in September 1971, with the first flight in a Tornado in August 1974. The engines are all electronically controlled with slightly different engine versions for each Tornado variant. In 1983, a Swiss organisation, the Arbeitsgruppe für Luft und Raumfahrt (ALR) based in Zurich, proposed an aircraft called the Piranha 6 powered by a single RB199.

The first prototype Eurofighter planes used the RB199 engine, until in June 1995 when the first EJ200-engined plane took off from Turin. Its predecessor, the British Aerospace EAP, also used the engines.

=== Management ===
The first chairman was Hugh Conway, the managing director of the Bristol (Filton) plant of Rolls-Royce. Marshal of the Royal Air Force Denis Spotswood was chairman from 1975 to 1980.

For many years, the designer of the Pegasus engine, Gordon Lewis, was managing director. Previous to him was Martin Steinberger of Motoren und Turbinen-Union (MTU - based in Munich). Karlheinz Koch was MD until 2008. The current managing director is Markus Becker (since July 2023).

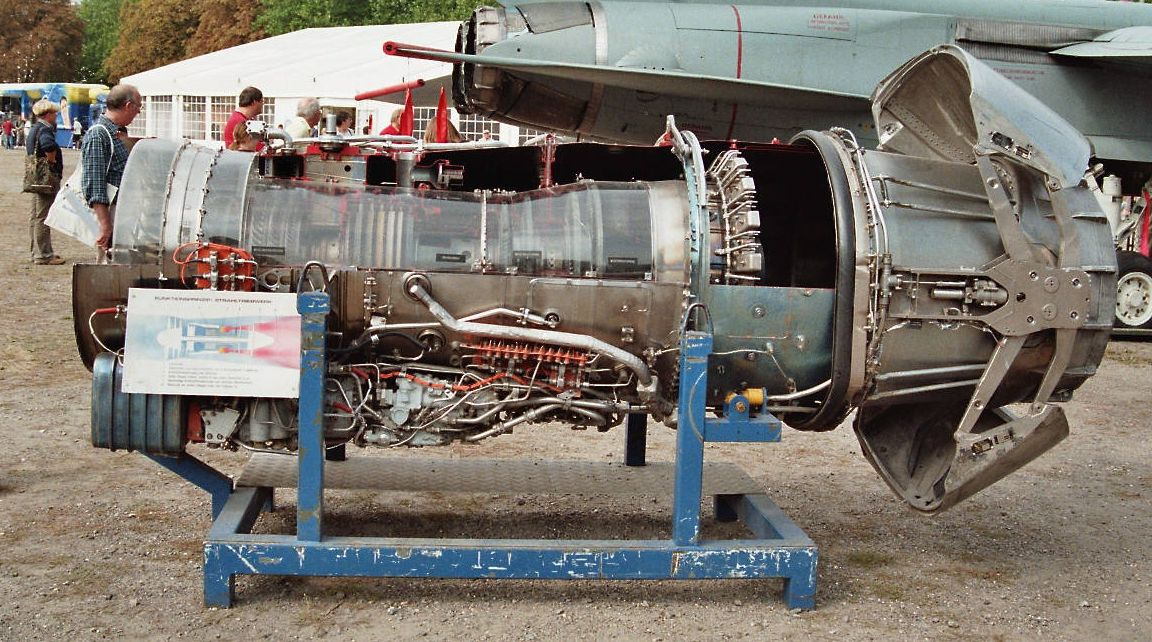
RB199 engine

== See also ==
- EuroJet Turbo GmbH
- Aerospace industry in the United Kingdom
- Rolls-Royce Turbomeca Limited - set up in 1965 between Rolls-Royce and France's Turbomeca to make the Rolls-Royce Turbomeca Adour for the SEPECAT Jaguar
