= HAL HF-73 =

Proposed twin engine strike fighter intended to be operated by the Indian Air Force

HF-73
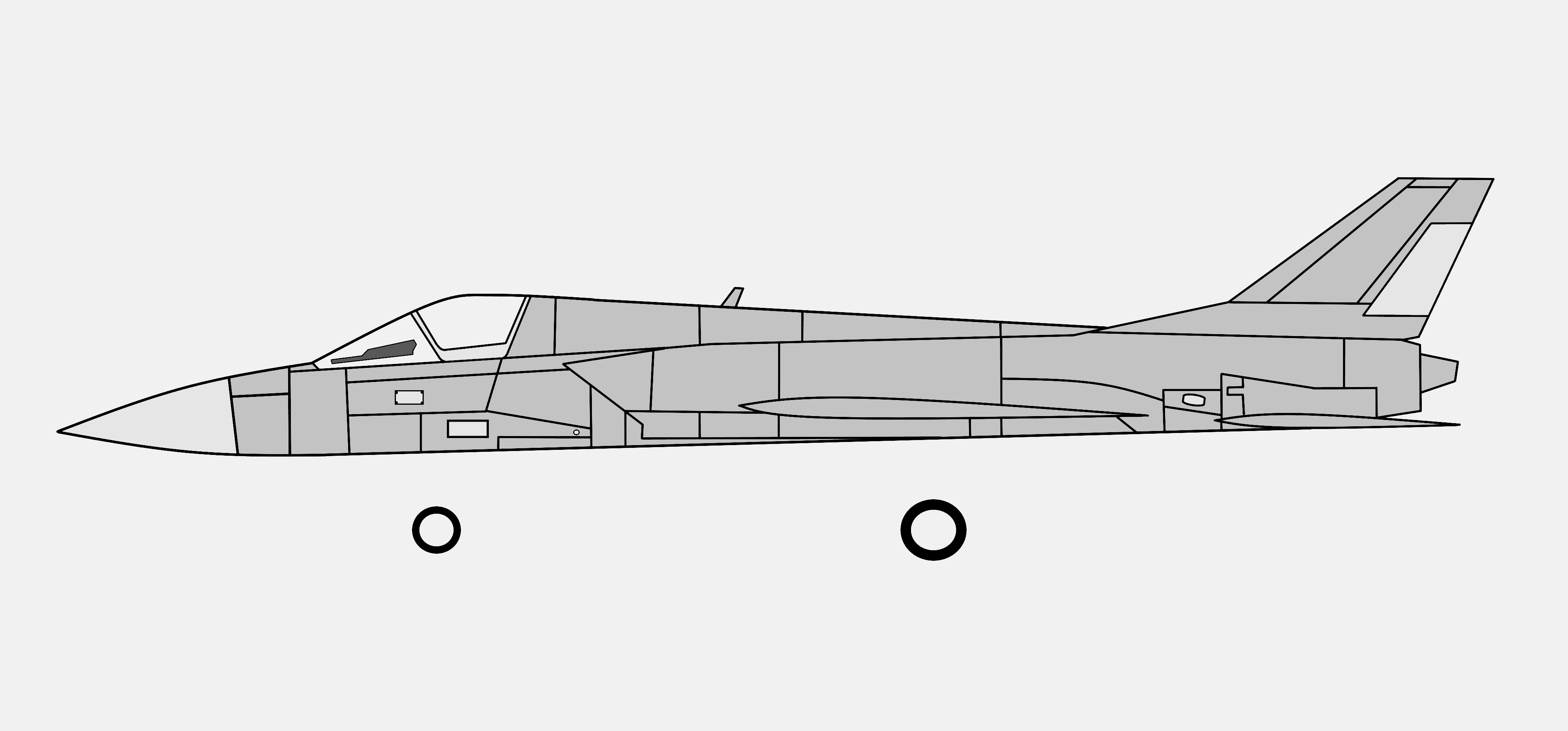
- HF-73 schematic diagram

General information
- Type: Strike fighter
- National origin: India/Germany
- Designer: Hindustan Aeronautics Limited, Messerschmitt-Bölkow-Blohm
- Status: Cancelled
- Primary user: Indian Air Force

The HF-73, also known as Hindustan Fighter-73, was a proposed twin-engined strike fighter intended to be operated by the Indian Air Force (IAF). It was a joint venture project undertaken by the aircraft manufacturers Hindustan Aeronautics Limited (HAL) of India and Messerschmitt-Bölkow-Blohm (MBB) of West Germany. The HF-73 was to be powered by Turbo-Union RB199 afterburning turbofan engines and also featured similar air intakes, although a fixed-wing arrangement was used instead of the Tornado's swing wing. However, arrangements to produce the RB199 was unsuccessful and the project was eventually cancelled in the late 1970s in favour of an imported strike fighter, the Anglo-French SEPECAT Jaguar.

== Development ==
=== Early proposals ===
During the later 1960s, HAL undertook abortive work on various fighter designs, including advanced models of the HAL HF-24 Marut and design studies for two ground attack fighters, designated GAF-I and GAF-II, in response to an Air Staff Requirements (ASR) issued by the IAF in 1966. However, these efforts would not come to fruition and, following the issuing of a revised ASR for an advanced Deep Penetration Strike Aircraft (DPSA) to replace both the English Electric Canberra tactical bombers and Hawker Hunter, the HAL-MBB joint venture was established in 1972. The two companies worked together on the design of the HF-73, which was similar in both design and role to the multi-national European consortium Panavia Aircraft GmbH's Panavia Tornado strike fighter.

=== Super Marut ===
During the 1960s, considerable efforts were expended on the development and production of the HAL HF-24 Marut, the first indigenously-produced fighter jet in India. Even prior to the Marut's induction into service with the Indian Air Force (IAF) in 1967, the service was seeking additional aircraft types for its inventory. During 1966, the IAF issued an Air Staff Requirements (ASR) that called for a ground attack fighter (GAF); specifically, the sought attack aircraft would possess a payload carrying capacity of 3500 kg and a combat range of 720 km. In response, the Indian aircraft manufacturer of the Marut, Hindustan Aeronautics Limited (HAL), promptly commenced design studies for the GAF; by 1967, it had submitted two design proposals towards meeting this requirement, designated GAF-I and GAF-II.

As proposed, GAF-I was a dedicated fighter bomber powered by SNECMA M45 engines while GAF-II design proposal submitted in 1967 was an interceptor – ground attack fighter conceptually similar to the McDonnell Douglas F-4 Phantom II. Extensive wind tunnel testing was performed in support of both design proposals; however, neither the GAF-I or the GAF-II received approval from the IAF.

Around this time, HAL had opted to separately work on a new variant of the Marut, commonly referred to as Super Marut or Marut Mk 2, in parallel to the development of GAF. A key feature of the envisioned Marut Mk 2 was its redesigned aft fuselage, which was to accommodate a pair of afterburning turbofan engines. It was intended that the Marut Mk 2 would be powered by two Rolls-Royce Turbomeca Adour turbofan engines equipped with afterburners. On 10 January 1970, the first prototype of the Marut Mk 2, designated as the Marut Mk 1R and powered by a pair of underpowered Bristol Siddeley Orpheus turbojet engines, performed its maiden flight, which ended in a fatal crash shortly after take off. This crash was attributed to the failure of the new canopy locking system at a critical stage of take off, which resulted in the rapid loss of airspeed and eventual crash and death of the test pilot. This incident significantly impacted the progress of the project; flight testing was resumed after three years. Around this perios, Kurt Tank also drew up a proposal for an aircraft with both Radar and two Mauser M27 cannons as a successor design.

=== HF-X programme ===
In response to the rejection of the previous design proposals by the IAF, HAL opted to form a joint venture with the West German aerospace company Messerschmitt-Bölkow-Blohm (MBB) in 1972. Kurt Tank's proposal was initially described as the HF-24 Mk III. A firm proposal submitted in 1973 and was designated HSS-73 for the Hindustan Supersonic Strike aircraft, before the title was changed to HF-73 to reflect the year 1973. HAL and MBB wanted to retain the favourable parts and the wing design from the Marut. The aircraft was to be an attack aircraft first and future variants would incorporate aerial reconnaissance and Air Defence capabilities. This partnership worked on what was commonly called the Hindustan Fighter – Experimental (HF-X) programme, which undertook the design and development of a new strike fighter for the IAF to fulfil its DPSA requirement. In 1975, HAL was planning for six flying prototypes and one ground-test airframe, with the aircraft to enter service in 1982. A single engined variant around the SNECMA M53 engine was also studied, but was determined to not be adequately manoeuvrable enough. HAL Also evaluated the same design as the HF-25 to use the R-25 engines from the MiG-21. In 1980, the IAF formally issued a revised ASR that sought an advanced Deep Penetration Strike Aircraft (DPSA) as a replacement for its ageing fleet of English Electric Canberra tactical bombers and Hawker Hunter fighter bombers.

As proposed, the HF-73 was a medium weight class strike fighter that possessed a maximum take off weight of 38,000 pounds (17,000 kg) and was to be powered by a pair of Turbo-Union RB199 afterburning turbofan engines. The proposed joint venture HF-73 design bore several similarities with the Panavia Tornado, in which the MBB was a developmental partner. Specifically, the HF-73 featured air intakes that were similar to that of Tornado, but the former was designed as a fixed wing aircraft. The HF-73 prototypes were planned to be powered by SNECMA M45 afterburning turbofan engines while the production aircraft were to be powered by more powerful RB199 afterburning turbofan engines. The procurement of RB199 engine did not proceed for various reasons, and as a result the decision was made for the production aircraft to powered by the SNECMA engine, which produced less thrust than what the design called for. HAL's inability to procure a suitable alternative to the planned RB199 engine, coupled with the IAF's reluctance to accept another underpowered fighter, eventually led to the termination of both the HF-X strike fighter programme along with the Super Marut programme sometime in the late 1970s.

In the long run, the DPSA requirement of the IAF was fulfilled via the procurement of the Anglo-French SEPECAT Jaguar strike aircraft in 1979. The Jaguar, which was capable of carrying out nuclear strike missions, was an attractive option for India; the nation tested its first nuclear device under the codename "Operation Smiling Buddha" in 1974.

== Specifications ==
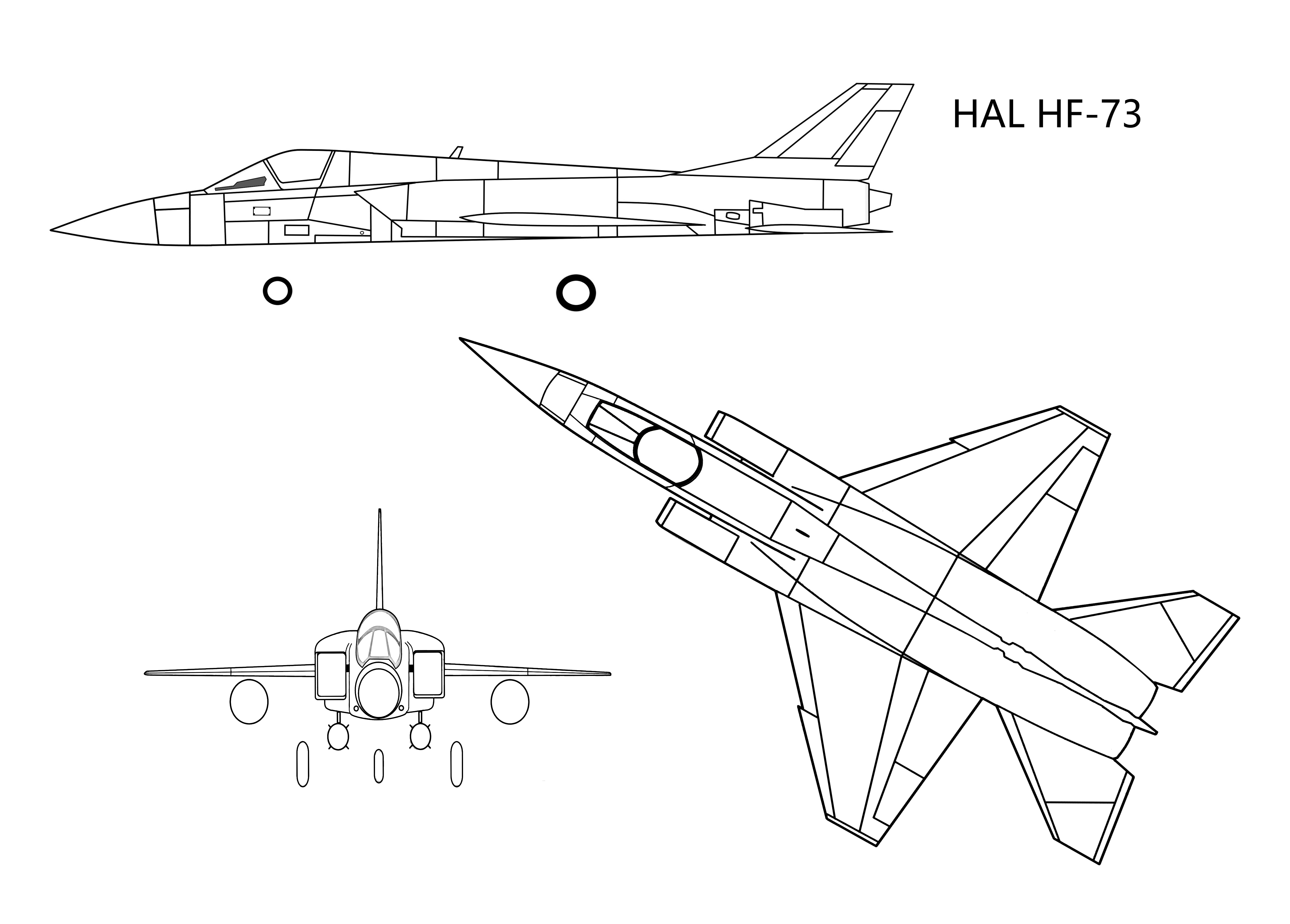
Schematic diagram of HF-73

Data from Jane's All the World's Aircraft 1977–78

General characteristics

- Crew: One
- Length: 15.13 m (49 ft 8 in)
- Wingspan: 9 m (29 ft 6 in)
- Height: 3.60 m (11 ft 10 in)
- Wing area: 28 m^{2} (300 sq ft)
- Empty weight: 6,565 kg (14,473 lb)
- Max takeoff weight: 17,000 kg (37,479 lb)
- Fuel capacity: 3,850 kg (8,490 lb) internal
- Payload: 6,035 kg (13,305 lb) external stores
- Powerplant: 2 × Turbo-Union RB199 34R

Performance

- Maximum speed: Mach 2
- Range: 650 km (400 mi, 350 nmi) at 740 km/h at sea level with 2000 kg external load
- Service ceiling: 18,000 m (59,000 ft)
- Rate of climb: 300 m/s (59,000 ft/min) at sea level
- Time to altitude: 16,000 meters in 2.1 minutes
- Wing loading: 450 kg/m^{2} (92 lb/sq ft)

== See also ==
- HAL HF-24 Marut
- HAL Ajeet
