= DASA =

1989–2000 German aerospace manufacturer

- Formerly: Deutsche AeroSpace AG; Daimler-Benz AeroSpace AG; DaimlerChrysler AeroSpace AG
- Type: Subsidiary
- Industry: Aerospace
- Predecessor: Daimler-Benz (aerospace unit); Dornier Flugzeugwerke; Messerschmitt-Bölkow-Blohm; MTU München
- Founded: May 19, 1989; 37 years ago
- Defunct: July 10, 2000
- Fate: MTU Aero Engines spun off; remainder merged into EADS (now Airbus)
- Headquarters: Munich, Germany
- Parent: Daimler-Benz (later DaimlerChrysler, now Mercedes-Benz Group)
- Website: dasa.com at the Wayback Machine (archived 1999-04-27)

DASA (officially Deutsche AeroSpace AG, later Daimler-Benz AeroSpace AG, then DaimlerChrysler AeroSpace AG) was a German aerospace manufacturer. Founded in May 1989 as the aerospace subsidiary of Daimler-Benz (later DaimlerChrysler, and now the Mercedes-Benz Group), the company combined Daimler-Benz's aerospace division and its other aviation subsidiaries—including MTU München and Dornier Flugzeugwerke, which had previously operated independently—with rival manufacturer Messerschmitt-Bölkow-Blohm (MBB), acquired by Daimler that year. It also incorporated the defense electronics, naval systems and radar divisions of AEG.

DASA’s existence was relatively brief, as the post–Cold War "peace dividend" of the 1990s encouraged consolidation across the aerospace industry. In July 2000, DASA merged with France's Aérospatiale-Matra and Spain's CASA to form EADS, which later rebranded as Airbus. After the formation of EADS, Daimler retained ownership of MTU, which was subsequently spun off in 2003 as MTU Aero Engines, an independent company that continues to operate.

== History ==
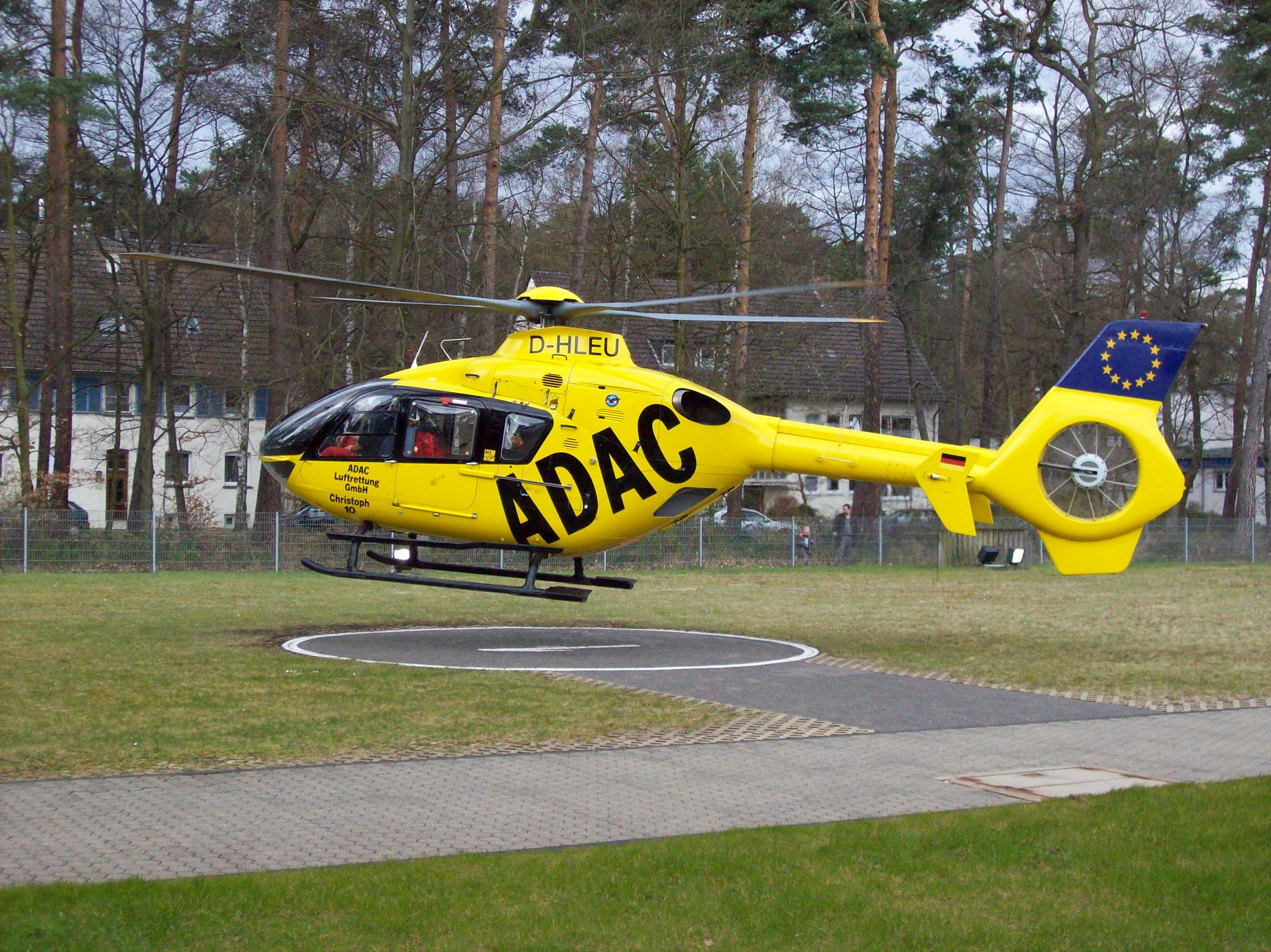
An ADAC Eurocopter EC135, 2008

DASA (from Deutsche Aerospace Aktiengesellschaft) was founded on 19 May 1989 by the merger of Daimler-Benz's aerospace interests, MTU München, and Dornier Flugzeugwerke. During December 1989, Daimler-Benz acquired rival German aerospace consortium Messerschmitt-Bölkow-Blohm (MBB) and merged it into DASA. During March 1990, Daimler-Benz initiated a major restructuring of the new group, integrating the previously separate companies into five product groups; Aircraft, Space Systems, Defense and Civil Systems/Propulsion. Several companies continued to exist under their own names but, by 1992, most (including MBB and TST) of the former entities had been fully integrated.

During 1992, DASA's helicopter portfolio, which had been largely inherited from MBB, was merged with the helicopter division of French manufacturer Aérospatiale to form Eurocopter. The Bo 108, DASA's in-development helicopter derived from MBB's highly successful Bo 105, was one of the assets transferred to the new company; it was launched as the Eurocopter EC135 during the early 1990s to considerable similar commercial success. By 2014, Eurocopter, which was subsequently rebranded as Airbus Helicopters, was a market leader in the field, operating four principal manufacturing plants in Europe (Marignane and La Courneuve in France, and Donauwörth and Kassel in Germany), plus 32 subsidiaries and participants around the world, including those in Brisbane, Australia, Albacete, Spain and Grand Prairie, USA. As of that same year, in excess of 12,000 helicopters built by the company were in service with over 3,000 customers across roughly 150 countries.

During the early 1990s, DASA became involved as a strategic partner of the Dutch aircraft manufacturer Fokker, the latter reportedly being interested in expanding its footprint in the regional aircraft sector. During 1993, it was announced that DASA purchased a 40 per cent stake in Fokker. However, by 1995, both Fokker and DASA were experiencing considerable financial difficulties, largely as a result of the extremely competitive nature of the regional market during this era. Fokker was forced to reduce production of its Fokker 50 airliner; and embark upon a major restructuring programme, including efforts to renegotiate prices with its suppliers, in what was viewed by aerospace publication Flight International as a last-ditch effort to save the company. During January 1996, DASA's board decided to distance the company from the struggling Fokker. At one stage, DASA had agreed to provide a rescue deal for the company, but this had been contingent upon a commitment by the Dutch government.

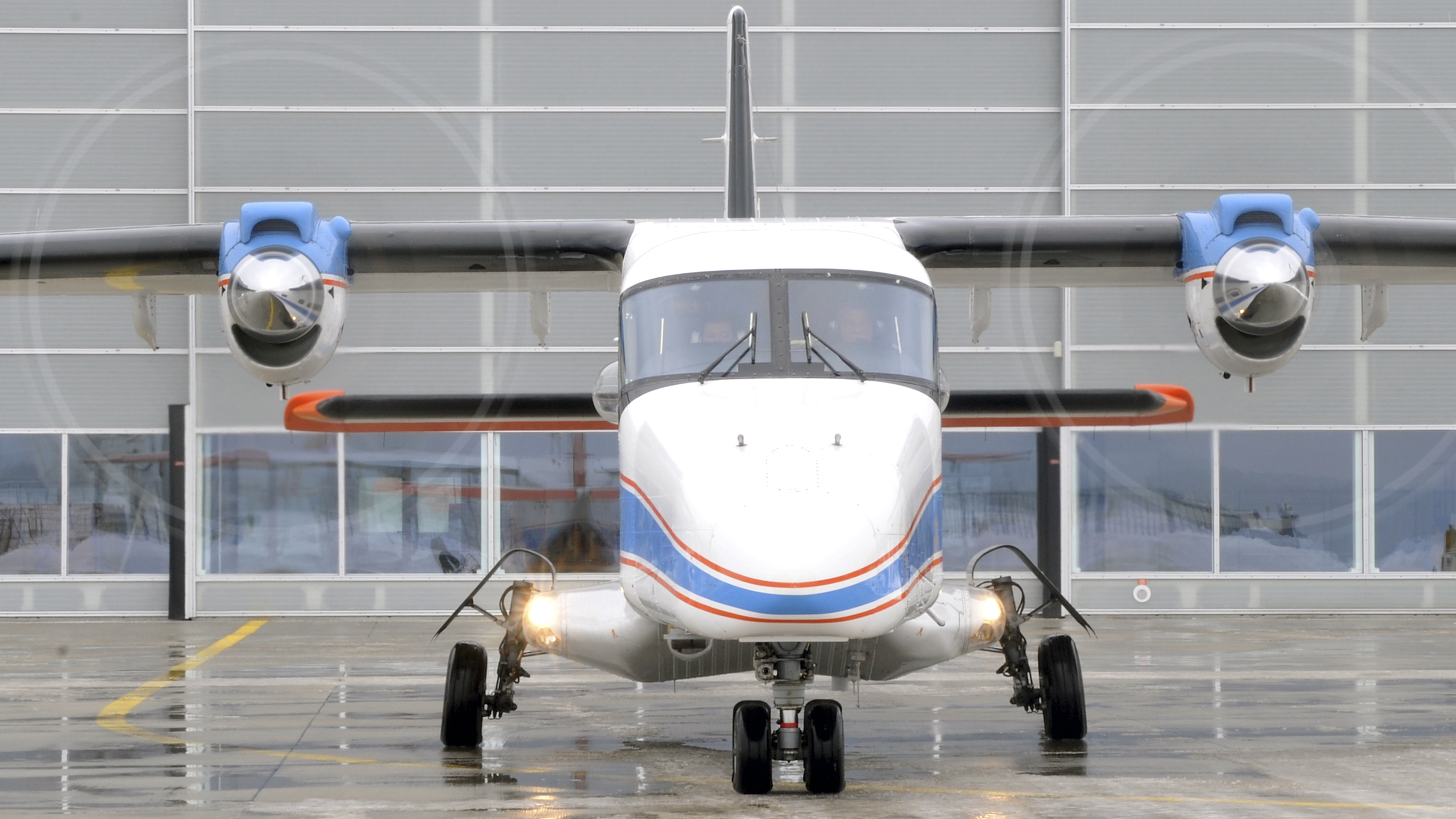
Head-on view of a Dornier 228

The poor state of the company's finances heavily contributed to DASA's decision to depart the regional aircraft market entirely. According, during June 1996, it was announced that DASA had sold the majority of the assets of its former Dornier division to American aviation company Fairchild Aircraft, leading to the creation of Fairchild Dornier. Furthermore, that same year, DASA announced that all manufacturing operations for the Dornier 228 would be transferred to Hindustan Aeronautics Limited (HAL) of India; two years later, activity on the German production line was permanently terminated. These moves were intended to concentrate the company's resources on the production of the larger Dornier 328 airliner, as well as to respond to Dornier's wider financial difficulties.

On 1 January 1995, the company announced that it had changed its name to Daimler-Benz Aerospace AG. As a consequence of the peace dividend of the 1990s following the dissolution of the Soviet Union, industry-wide consolidation increased. Following the merger of parent company Daimler Benz with American car manufacturer Chrysler Corporation during 1998, the company was renamed DaimlerChrysler Aerospace AG on 7 November 1998. Management and politicians alike remained keen to form partnerships with other European companies in the aerospace and defense sectors.

On 10 July 2000, it was announced that DASA (minus MTU) had formally merged with Aérospatiale-Matra of France and Construcciones Aeronáuticas SA (CASA) of Spain to form the European Aeronautic Defence and Space Company (EADS). Following the merger, the former DaimlerChrysler Aerospace division initially operated as EADS Deutschland GmbH; following the rebranding of EADS as Airbus Group, the division was formally rebranded as Airbus Defence and Space GmbH.

== Major projects ==
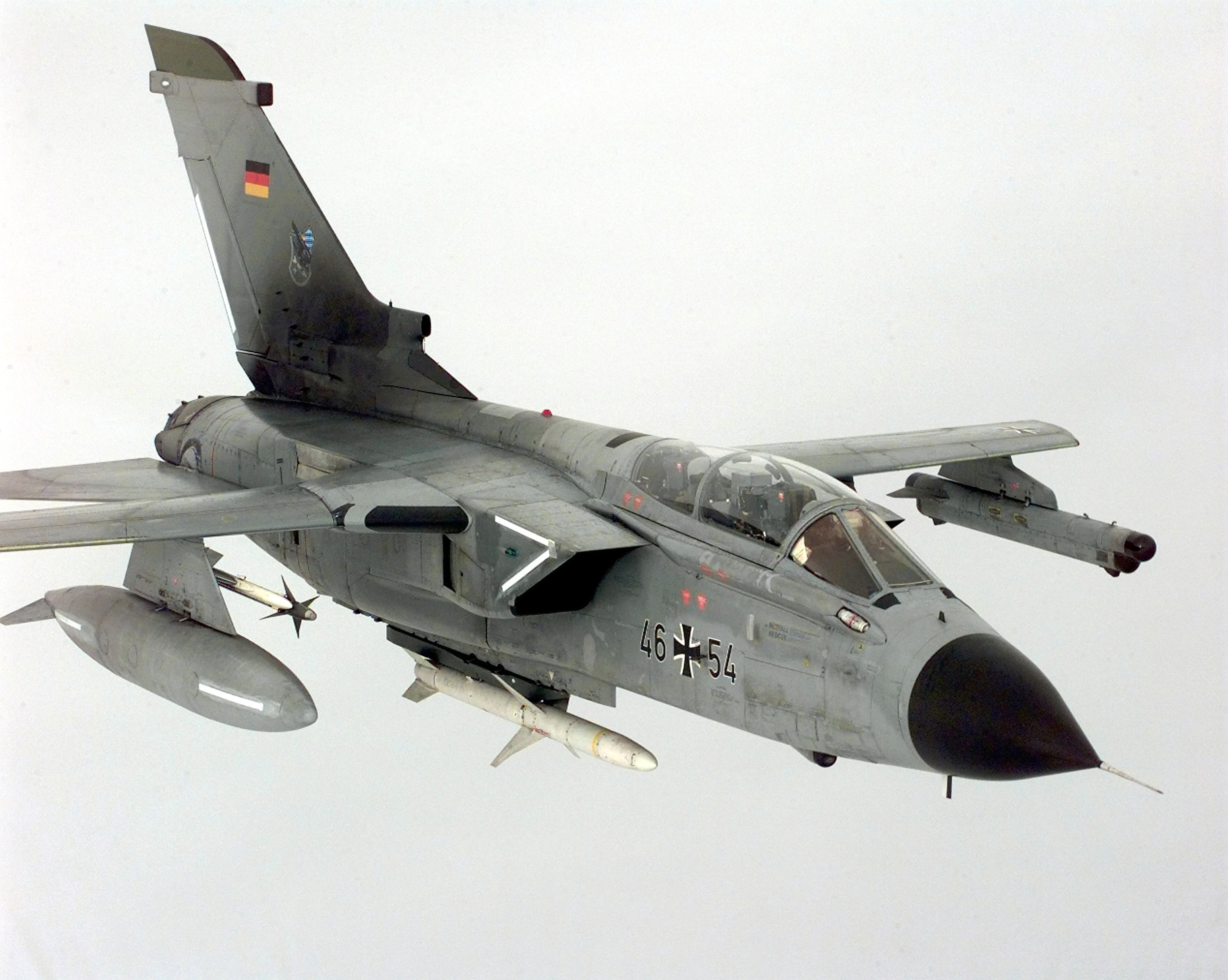
A Tornado ECR of the German Air Force in 1999

Immediately upon its creation, DASA was associated with several ongoing aircraft programmes, including the multinational Eurofighter Typhoon fighter programme, the Panavia Tornado fighter-bomber, along with various other initiatives and partnerships. The company's work on the Tornado was largely conducted via Panavia Aircraft GmbH, a tri-national consortium consisting of British Aerospace (previously British Aircraft Corporation), Aeritalia of Italy, and DASA, having inherited MBB's involvement. Under this arrangement, DASA manufactured the Tornado's central fuselage on behalf of all international customers while the other partners manufactured the rest of the airframe. DASA's subsidiary MTU also held a 40 per cent stake in the Tornado's engine manufacturer Turbo-Union, a separate multinational company formed to develop and build the RB199 engines for the aircraft. Production of the Tornado was terminated during 1998; the final batch of aircraft being produced was delivered to the Royal Saudi Air Force, who had ordered a total of 96 IDS Tornados. DASA was also responsible for the mid life upgrade (MLU) of the German fleet of Panavia Tornados, similar to the RAF's GR4 upgrade.

During the 1990s, the Eurofighter proceeded towards the mass production phase, DASA holding a workshare stake in the programme. The workshare split had originally been agreed at 33/33/21/13 (United Kingdom/Germany/Italy/Spain) based on the number of units being ordered by each contributing nations. However, following order cuts during the peace dividend following the collapse of the Soviet Union, the programme's workshare split was renegotiated as 43% for EADS MAS in Germany and Spain; 37.5% for BAE Systems in the UK; and 19.5% for Alenia. On 27 March 1994, the maiden flight of the Eurofighter prototype took place in Bavaria, flown by DASA chief test pilot Peter Weger. Production was divided into three tranches, these being a production/funding distinction without directly implying an incremental increase in capability with each tranche. Tranche 3 was later divided into A and B parts. In September 1998, contracts were signed for production of 148 Tranche 1 aircraft and procurement of long lead-time items for Tranche 2 aircraft. In March 2008, the final aircraft out of Tranche 1 was delivered to the German Air Force, with all successive deliveries being at the Tranche 2 standard or above.

Owing to its expertise with both German and NATO aircraft, DaimlerChrysler Aerospace provided various upgrade packages for a wide range of aircraft, such as the McDonnell Douglas F-4 Phantom II and the Boeing E-3 Sentry. During 1993, MiG Aircraft Support GmbH was established with DaimlerChrysler Aerospace holding a 50% stake. The company undertook the upgrade of the German Air Force's fleet of 24 MiG-29s to NATO standards. These fighters had been inherited from the former East Germany after the reunification of the country in 1991.

== Aircraft ==
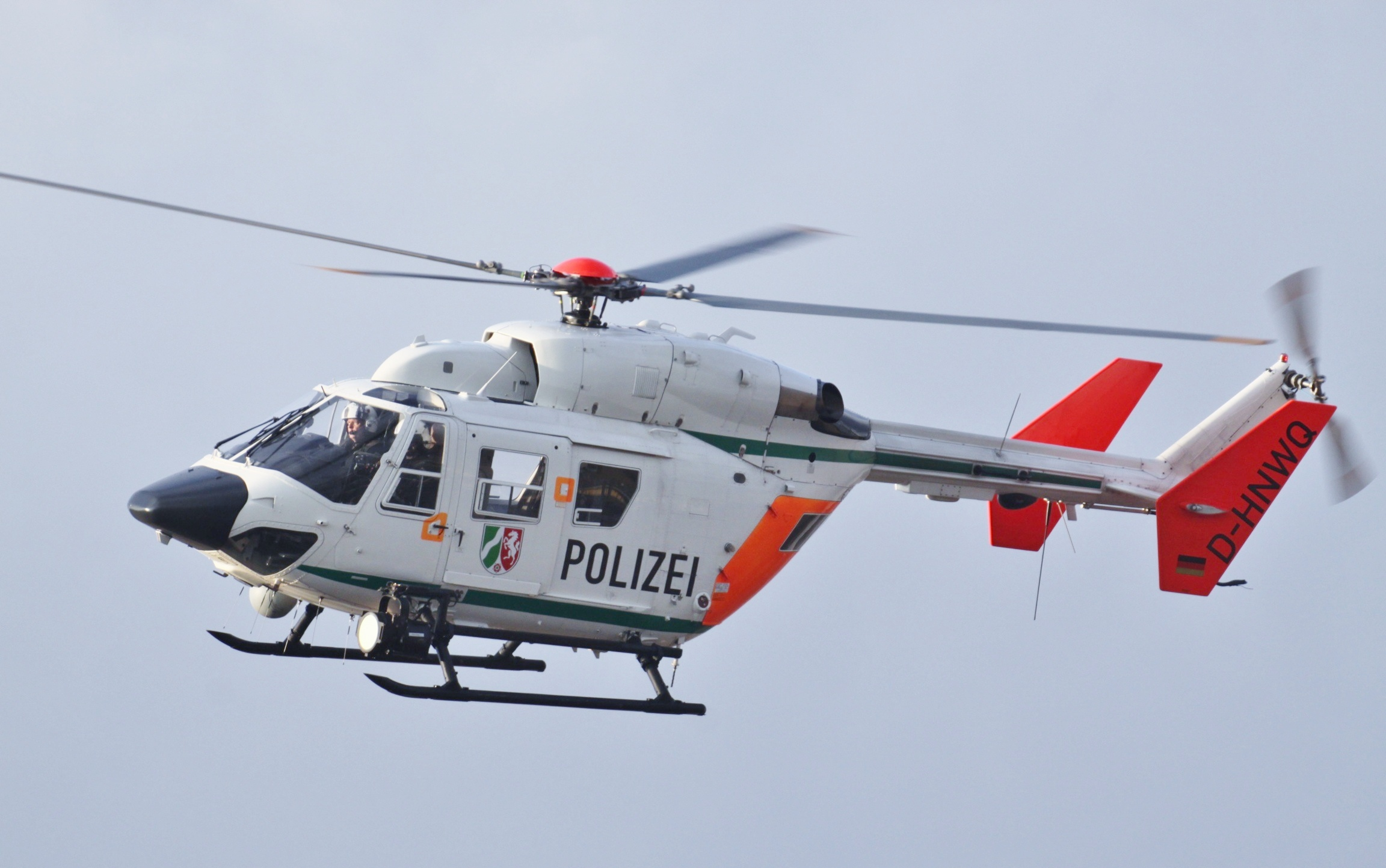
A Polizei BK 117

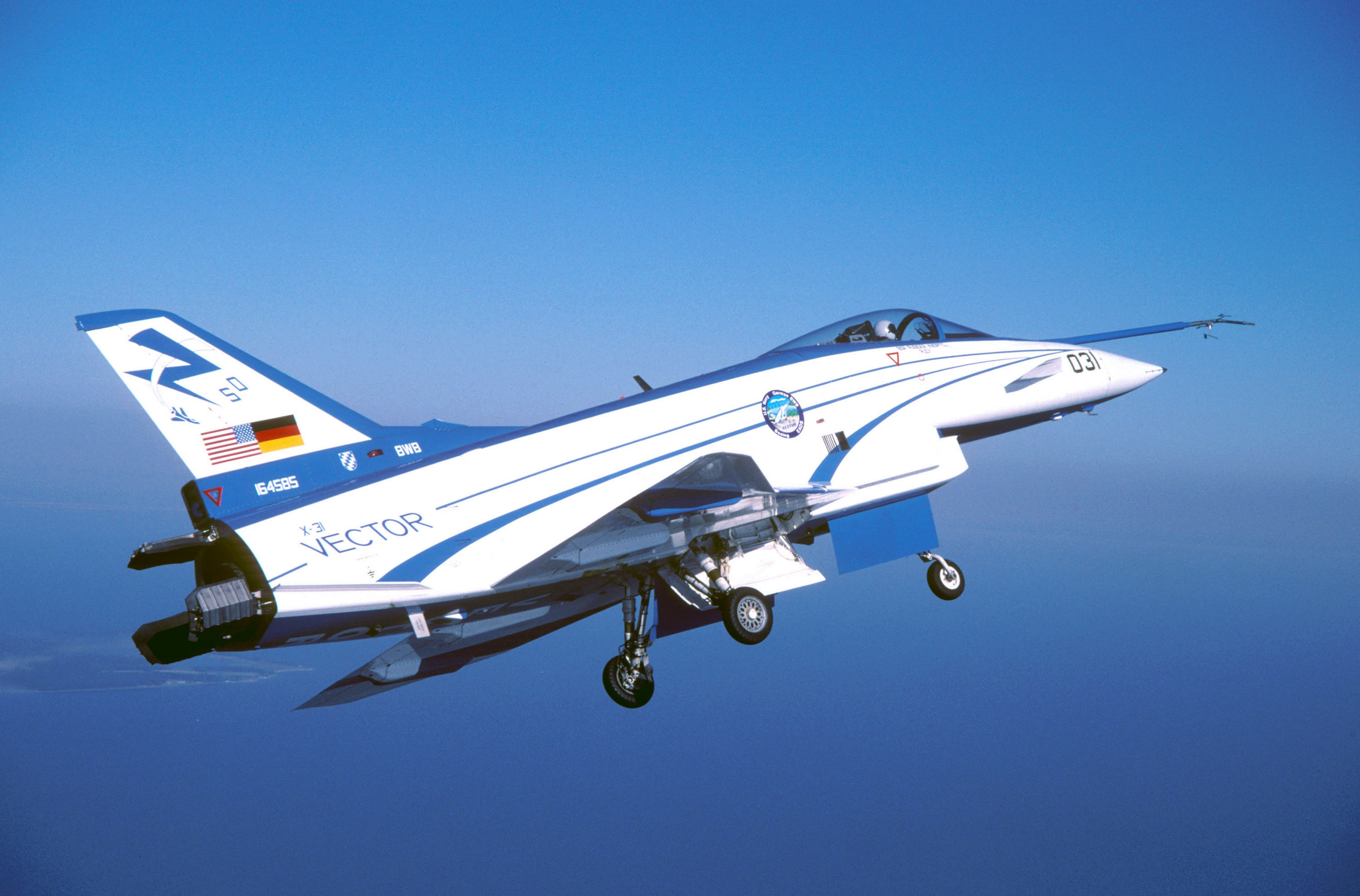
Rockwell-MBB X-31, one of two X-31 Enhanced Fighter Maneuverability Demonstrator aircraft (top)

- Dornier 228
- Dornier 328
- Eurocopter AS355 Écureuil 2
- MBB Bo 105
- MBB Bo 108 - became the Eurocopter EC 135
- MBB/Kawasaki BK 117
- MBB F-104G/CCV (CCV Program)

=== Partnerships ===
- Airbus A300
- Airbus A310
- Airbus A320 family
- Eurofighter Typhoon
- Fokker 50
- Fokker 70
- Fokker 100
- MPC 75
- Panavia Tornado
- Rockwell-MBB X-31
