= Gordon Lewis (engineer) =

British engineer (1924–2010)

Gordon Lewis CBE FREng
- Born: 24 June 1924; Cheltenham, England
- Died: 4 October 2010 (aged 86); Bristol
- Education: Pembroke College, Oxford
- Engineering career
- Institutions: Bristol Aeroplane Company; Bristol Siddeley; Turbo-Union
- Projects: Bristol Pegasus
- Significant advance: Aero engines
- Awards: CBE; FREng

Gordon Manns Lewis (24 June 1924 – 4 October 2010) was a British aeronautical engineer who made significant contributions to the arts and sciences of turbine engine design.

== Early life ==
He was born in Cheltenham in 1924, the son of a clerk on the Great Western Railway. He won a scholarship to Pembroke College, Oxford and graduated in Engineering Science in 1944.

== Career ==
=== Bristol Engines ===
He joined the Bristol Aeroplane Company in 1944 and was put to work on stress calculations of the Theseus engine. In 1946 he was entrusted with the design of the Olympus engine, which performed flawlessly on its very first test bed run, largely as a result of the discipline that Gordon Lewis brought to its design. [See Pegasus The Heart of the Harrier, by Andrew Dow.] The Olympus was later developed to power the Avro Vulcan, TSR-2 and Concorde.

He was given responsibility for compressor design generally, and among other projects worked on transonic compressors, this being well ahead of equivalent work in America. He also examined the virtues of two-spool engines with contra-rotating spools, and hypersonic designs. In 1956 he was asked to comment upon the proposal made by Michel Wibault for a Vertical takeoff fighter powered by an engine of Wibault's conception, using vectored thrust. Gordon Lewis simplified and lightened the design, incorporating axial compressors and pairs of rotatable nozzles for the cold and hot gas streams. This was evolved into the BE53/2, later named the Pegasus. The master patents for this engine were in the names of Michel Wibault and Gordon Lewis. The Pegasus powered, successively, the Hawker P.1127, Kestrel, Harrier and Harrier II. It remains in service with the US Marine Corps.

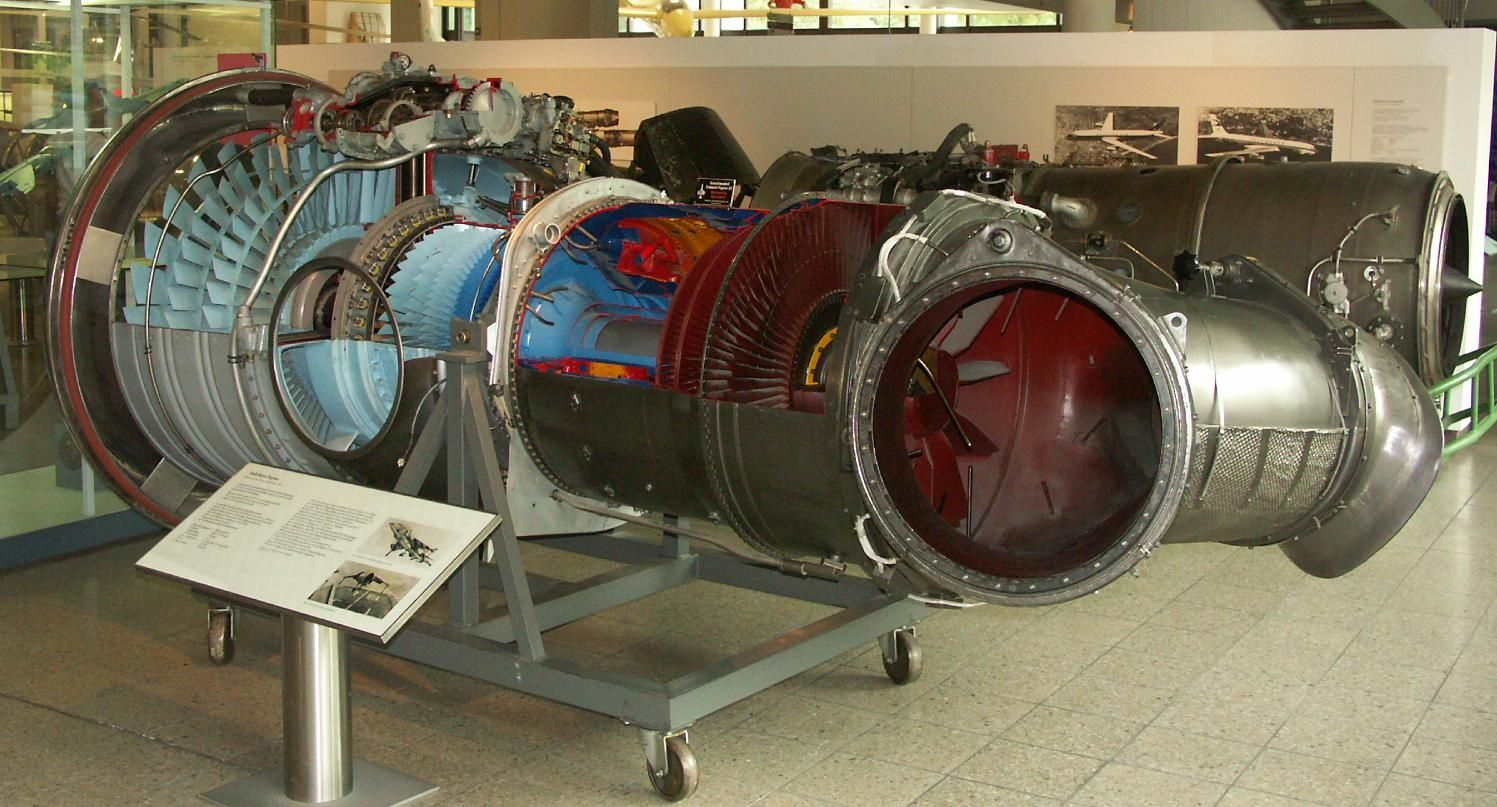
Pegasus engine

=== Rolls-Royce ===
Gordon Lewis spent some years as Managing Director of Turbo-Union, which developed the Turbo-Union RB199 engine for the Panavia Tornado. His patented devices cover a forty-year span, and he remained active in many aspects of turbine engine work well into the 21st century.

== Personal life ==
He died in Bristol on 4 October 2010.
