= BAE Systems CAFD =

British experimental fighter aircraft

BAE Systems Combat Air Flying Demonstrator (CAFD)

General information
- National origin: United Kingdom
- Manufacturer: BAE Systems

History
- First flight: Expected 2027
- Initiated: July 2022

The CAFD or Combat Air Flying Demonstrator is a British technology demonstrator aircraft under development by BAE Systems for the UK's Ministry of Defence (MoD). Commissioned in July 2022 under the then UK-led Tempest programme, the CAFD is designed to derisk the development of technologies for a future sixth-generation stealth fighter. The data collected by the demonstrator are expected to be carried over into the UK's contribution to the multinational Global Combat Air Programme (GCAP) with Japan and Italy. The first flight of the CAFD is expected to take place in 2027.

== Development ==
=== Background ===
At the 2018 Farnborough Airshow the United Kingdom unveiled a mock-up of Tempest, a sixth-generation multi-role, stealth fighter that would be developed as a future replacement for the Eurofighter Typhoon for the Royal Air Force (RAF). This was to be developed by an industrial collaboration known as Team Tempest, consisting of BAE Systems, Rolls-Royce, MBDA UK and Leonardo UK, working alongside the MoD and the RAF Rapid Capabilities Office. Italy would join the programme in September 2019. The Tempest programme would also be supported by Flight Test Aircraft (FTA) named 'Excalibur', a modified Boeing 757 which would be used to test and demonstrate communication and sensor technologies for the future fighter.

In February 2022, the MoD commissioned Team Tempest with the development of a crewed, supersonic demonstrator that would take flight in 2027. Its function would be to test additional new technologies including notably stealth features as well as aircraft integration skills which will be used by UK industry to support the development of the future fighter programme.

In December 2022, it was announced the Tempest programme would merge with the Japanese Mitsubishi F-X programme to form the Global Combat Air Programme (GCAP) with the UK, Italy, and Japan now jointing developing a fighter together. Both the Excalibur FTA and the supersonic demonstrator initially referred to as the Combat Flying Technology Demonstrator, would continue after the merger, not as the prototype for GCAP, but as UK-funded effort to support its industrial contribution to the programme.

=== Design and manufacture ===
Combat Air Flying Demonstrator is a crewed, twin-engine, supersonic stealth, platform featuring a mid-set modified cropped-delta wing with canted twin-tailfins and lacking horizontal stabilisers. It is designed to de-risk the development of future fighter aircraft by rehearsing the application of new design and manufacturing technologies, as well as aircraft certification and testing processes, capabilities UK has not fully utilised in decades. For instance, BAE had not built aircraft wings outside of Hawk or Harrier production, with those of more recent aircraft like Eurofighter and Tornado having been manufactured in Europe. The lessons learned from CAFD will feed into the UK's industrial contribution to GCAP much like Japan's Mitsubishi X-2 demonstrator flown in 2016, with the efforts of the CAFD programme having already been said to have saved years of development risk. CAFD is also the UK's first crewed demonstrator aircraft since the British Aerospace EAP from forty years earlier.

The demonstrator is expected to be slightly smaller than the production fighter of GCAP, but its size is still estimated to be a third larger than the Eurofighter with a capacious internal weapons bay, the first British-made aircraft with such a feature since the Blackburn Buccaneer, with MBDA UK assisting with weapons integration and eventual weapons deployment at supersonic speeds. CAFD and will be powered by two unmodified EJ200 engines integrated into a BAE developed engine intake incorporating diverterless supersonic inlets and serpentine engine ducting to increase stealth performance. However, whilst CAFD will contain and test low-observable features in its design and manufacture to inform the definitive fighter (airframe shape and internal weapons bays), however, it will lack the application of some stealth coatings as these can instead be tested on static radar cross section models and would otherwise add unnecessary cost and security considerations for the demonstrator.

The aircraft's cockpit will feature a touchscreen large-area display similar to what has been developed for Typhoon but will lack the smaller high-integrity panels. Because of the size of the main display, the aircraft will be controlled by a sidestick rather than a central control column and may also incorporate haptic feedback. The crew safety systems are derived from Typhoon including all flight gear and the use of a Martin Baker Mk16A ejector seat. Static and sled-based ejection trials from a representative cockpit took place between 2021 and 2022.

The development of CAFD's flight systems includes the use of auto-coding which allowed critical system software to be created in a matter of days rather than weeks, as well as the Pyramid reusable open-system mission architecture developed by the MoD to make avionic upgrades to aircraft simpler, cheaper, and quicker. The demonstrator also has a digital twin. Manufacture of the aircraft has included the use of hot isostatic presssing to reduce material waste and lead time associated with forgings with reportedly reductions from four-years to potentially twelve to six-months, in addition to the use of additive manufacturing. The demonstrator also features one of the largest composite parts ever built for a British military aircraft.

On 22 July 2026, BAE Systems announced that the final assembly of around half of the aircraft's main structure has commenced while the design of 11,500 parts of the aircraft, accounting of over 90% of the aircraft's weight, has been completed. CAFD is expected to be ready for flight by the end of 2027.

== See also ==
- British Aerospace EAP
- Mitsubishi X-2 Shinshin
- Global Combat Air Programme
