= ALR Piranha =

Aircraft project

Piranha

General information
- Type: Fighter aircraft
- National origin: Switzerland
- Designer: ETH Zürich & ALR
- Number built: 0

The ALR Piranha was an aircraft project undertaken by the Swiss Air Force's Swiss Working Group for Aerospace (ALR) to develop a lightweight multi-role combat aircraft with canard wings. The ALR is the Aerospace Project Development Group of the Swiss Air Force. The project was managed by Georges Bridel, an engineer at the ETH Zurich (the Swiss Federal Institute of Technology).

== History ==
Size comparison of an ALR Piranha with the SEPECAT Jaguar and McDonnell Douglas F-15

After the Swiss government cancelled the FFA N-20 and an order for 100 FFA P-16s, the Swiss aviation industry and the ETH Zurich made a final attempt to build their own Swiss fighter aircraft. The plans called for a small fighter plane similar in class to the F-5E, which the Swiss Air Force later ordered.

In the 1960s and 1970s, modern military aircraft equipment was too expensive for small states to afford. The increase in the cost of flight material and weapons resulted in reductions in fleet sizes and capacity of service branches of small states to perform in combat. The strategy for the ALR Piranha was to deliver a design that would utilize common parts that could be built to support multiple mission types; air and ground attack, reconnaissance, electronic warfare, and operational training. The result was a fighter plane with significantly reduced size relative to the F-5E (20% smaller surface).

The Piranha design was of close-coupled canard arrangement, with a shoulder-mounted, low aspect ratio main wing of near-delta plan. Seven hard-points for weapons were planned, with four under-wing pylons and one on the aircraft center line rated at 500 kilograms (1,100 lb), plus rails on the aircraft's wingtips for air-to-air missiles such as the AIM-9 Sidewinder or the R.550 Magic. A single cannon, either the heavy, powerful 30 mm Oerlikon KCA or the lighter Mauser BK-27, would be mounted on the aircraft's center line, with the nose wheel slightly offset as a result.

The ALR would have been equipped with avionics, radar, armament and engines from abroad, and a laser seeking sensor in front of the cockpit. In the single-engine model design, air brakes would be located on the sides of the rear hull. In the twin-engine version, the two air brake flaps would be mounted on the upper fuselage near the vertical tail.

The ALR Piranha would have been either a single-engine version, powered by RB199, EJ200 or M88 or a twin-engine model with two Larzacs. In the two models, only the rear portion of the aircraft would differ in size, affecting the arrangement of the parachute container and the air brakes.

Although the Swiss government lost interest in the project, prototype remote-controlled model ALR Piranha airplanes did reach the wind-tunnel and flight testing phase. A life-size mock cockpit was also constructed. Additionally, engineers designed a new concept for aircraft bunkers using a rotating floor disc for easy handling of the aircraft within the hangar. No prototype of the aircraft bunker was built.

== Variants ==
Piranha 1
Subsonic variants.
Piranha 2C
Transonic ground attack model, powered by a single Rolls-Royce Turbomeca Adour Mk 811 (RT172-58) engine with 24.6–37.4 kN (5,530–8,408 lbf) thrust (with or without afterburner), no radar and small 13.5 m^{2} (145.3 sq ft) wings.
Piranha 2D (1)
Version for attack and air superiority fighter, a 29.2–44.9 kN (6,564–10,094 lbf) thrust Adour (RT172-63), full avionics and small 13.5 m^{2} (145.3 sq ft) wings.
Piranha 2D (2)
Like as (1) but with a large wing 16 m^{2} (172.2 sq ft).
Piranha 4
2 × SNECMA Turbomeca Larzac M-74/05 turbofan engines (15% more thrust at supersonic speed than RT172-63), shorter and wider fuselage.
Piranha 5
2 × 18.4–30.2 kN (4,136–6,789 lbf) Garrett TFE 1042-7 turbofan engines.
Piranha 6
1 × 40.5–73 kN (9,105–16,411 lbf) Turbo-Union RB.199 Mk.104 turbofan engine.

== General characteristics ==
- Length: 37 ft, 11.57 m / 10.50 m / 10.7 m / 10.7 m
- Wingspan: 25 ft, 7.62 m / 6.49 m / 6.49 m / 6 m
- Height: 13 ft, 4.25 m / 4.12 m
- Wing area: 22 m^{2} / 16 m^{2} / 16 m^{2} / 13.5 sq m
- Empty weight: 4340 kg / 3800 kg
- Max fuel: 2160 kg +
- External load max: 3500 kg
- Normal TOW: 7040 kg / 5900 kg
- Max TOW: 10.000 kg

== Performance ==
- Maximum speed: Mach 1.8
- Maximum speed: 1,200kts (2,222 km/h, 1,381 mph)
- Max rate of climb: 295 m/s (59,000 ft/min)
- Ceiling: 16,800 m (55,200 ft)
- Off distance: 300 m (984 ft)
- Combat radius, lo-lo-lo, 2000 kg weapons load, 20 min cruise, 5 min combat mission: 400 km 300 km

== Armament ==
1 × cannon (KCA 30mm, 27mm Mauser, General Electric GE-430 30mm) Piranha 6/4 Piranha / Piranha 2D (2) / Piranha 2D (1)

3,500 kg weapon load

== Avionics ==
  - Ferranti FIN 1020nav / attack, Type 105D Laser Distance Meters, HUD Smith, Thomson-CSF Agave radar.
  - INS FINAS FerrantiFINAS INS 2000 Ferranti 4510 HUD, Type 105D Laser Distance Meters, Emerson APG-69, APG-67 or General Electric Blue Vixen radar.

== See also ==
- BAe P.106
- Boeing Model 985-121
- Saab JAS 39 Gripen
