= Panavia Aircraft =

German military aircraft manufacturer

Panavia Aircraft GmbH

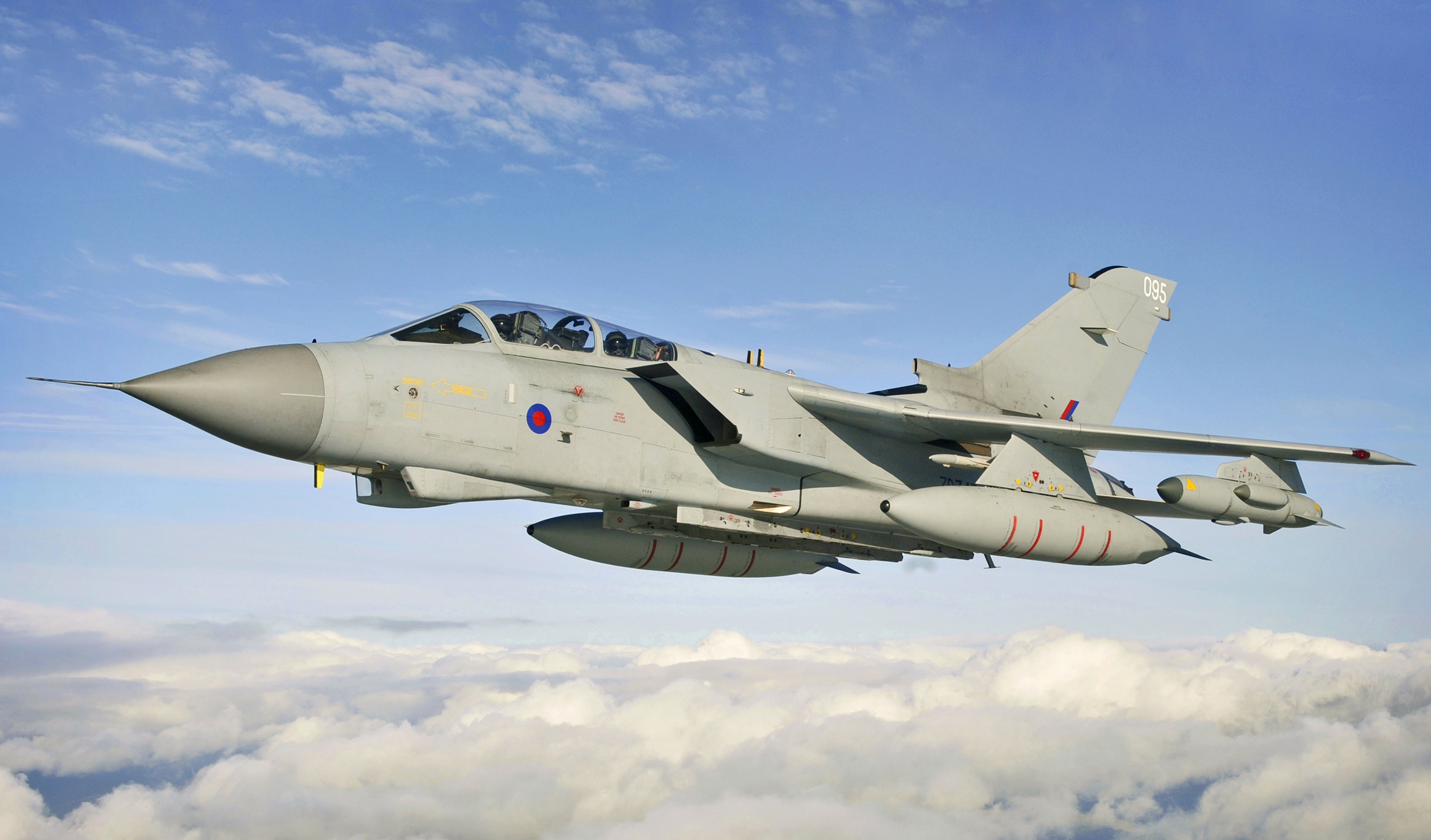
- The Panavia Tornado, the company's primary product
- Type: Joint venture
- Industry: Aerospace
- Founded: 29 March 1969
- Founder: British Aircraft Corporation; Messerschmitt-Bölkow-Blohm
- Headquarters: Hallbergmoos, Germany
- Area served: UK, Italy, Germany
- Key people: Dr. Welf-Werner Degel; Jeffrey Quill
- Products: Panavia Tornado; Panavia Tornado ADV
- Parent: Airbus (42.5%); BAE Systems (42.5%); Leonardo (15%)
- Website: panavia.de

Panavia Aircraft GmbH is a German company established by the three partner states of the Tornado Multi Role Combat Aircraft (MRCA) project: West Germany, Italy and the UK.

== Structure ==
The company was based and registered in West Germany. Since its founding the company is based in Hallbergmoos, a municipality in the district of Freising in Upper Bavaria, Germany.

In a similar arrangement, development of the Tornado's RB199 turbofans is undertaken by the multinational Turbo-Union Limited based in the UK (Moor Lane, Derby).

The partner companies are:

- 42.5% Airbus (Airbus Defence and Space)
- 42.5% BAE Systems (BAE Systems Military Air & Information)
- 15% Leonardo

== History ==
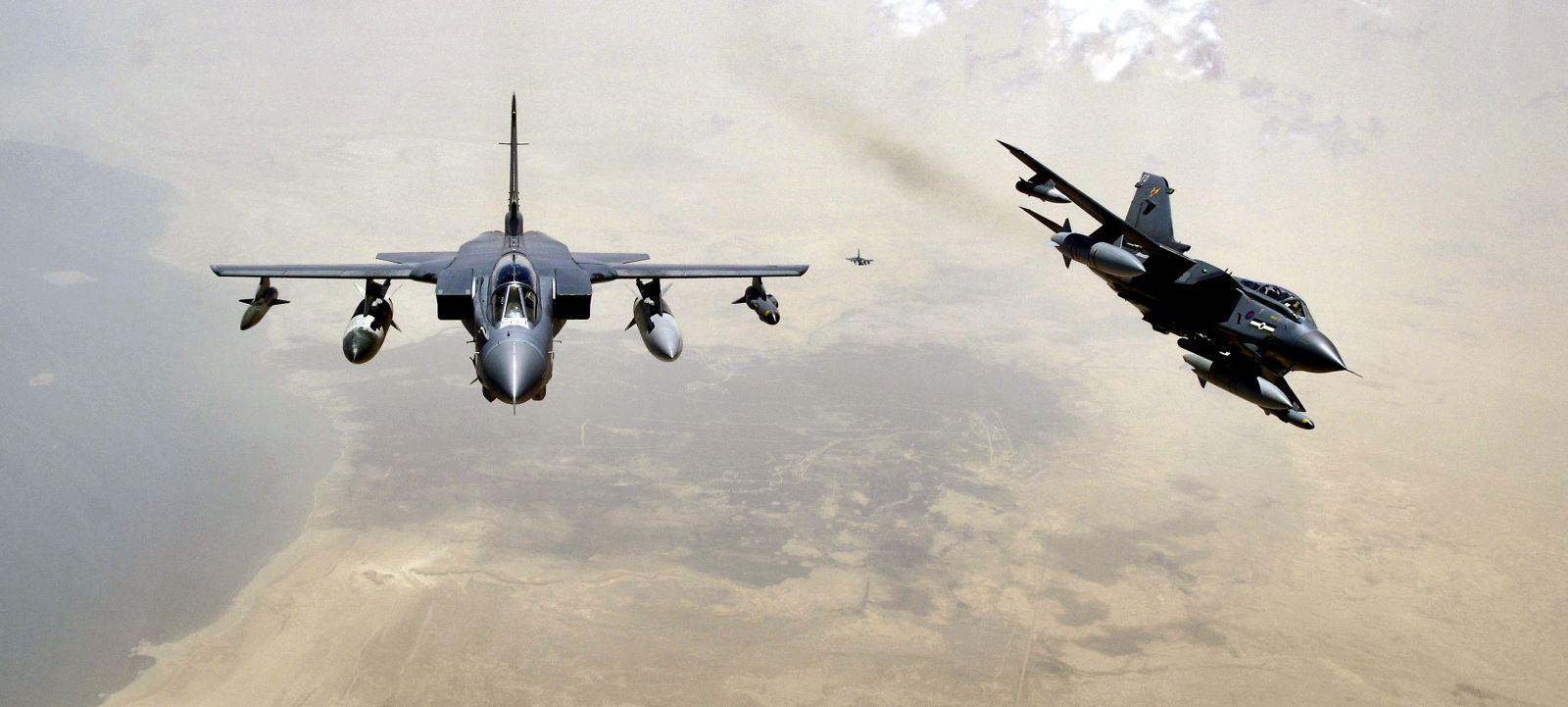
RAF Panavia Tornados over Iraq.

In the late 1960s, the British, German and Italian main defence companies looked at developing a strike aircraft together. The West Germans and Italians wanted a more short-range battlefield aircraft (something like the current A-10), but the British, specifically Air Chief Marshal Derek Hodgkinson, argued for a more long range aircraft. Negotiations took place in London, Bonn and Munich.

The NATO Multirole Combat Aircraft Development and Production Management Agency (NAMMA) was established to manage development and production of the Tornado. It was initially based in the same building as Panavia.

=== Formation ===
Panavia was established in 1969 by the British Aircraft Corporation, Messerschmitt-Bölkow-Blohm (which had formed the year before) and Fiat Aviazione (which became Aeritalia that year). It was planned to produce more than 1,000 aircraft. An aircraft was needed to counter the perceived threat from Russian aircraft such as the MiG-25 Foxbat and the Su-15 Flagon aircraft, which had been in service since around 1967. A multi-purpose aircraft was needed to allow a long production run and to lower costs per aircraft (unit price). In 1970, the unit cost was expected to be only $2.9m.

Around 1965, the UK (BAC) had been negotiating with France (Dassault Aviation) to produce the AFVG (Anglo-French Variable Geometry), which looked remarkably similar to what became the Tornado. The project failed due to the French manufacturer wanting to produce its own all-French variable geometry aircraft (the experimental Dassault Mirage G) which first flew in 1967, and never entered service, being cancelled in the 1970s. Marcel Dassault later saw the Panavia project as a direct threat to his company. Another Anglo-French defence project of the late 1960s was the SEPECAT Jaguar.

In 1959, the French and West Germans had collaborated to form Transall, which produced the Transall C-160 transport aircraft in 1963.

Canada and the Netherlands withdrew from the project in 1969 for financial reasons. The first Chairman was Allen Greenwood, of BAC in Weybridge.

In 1989, the German involvement became DaimlerChrysler Aerospace (DASA). On 15 September 1986, the Munich offices (which also housed the Bavarian State Office for Environmental Protection) were damaged by a bomb.

=== Panavia Tornado ===
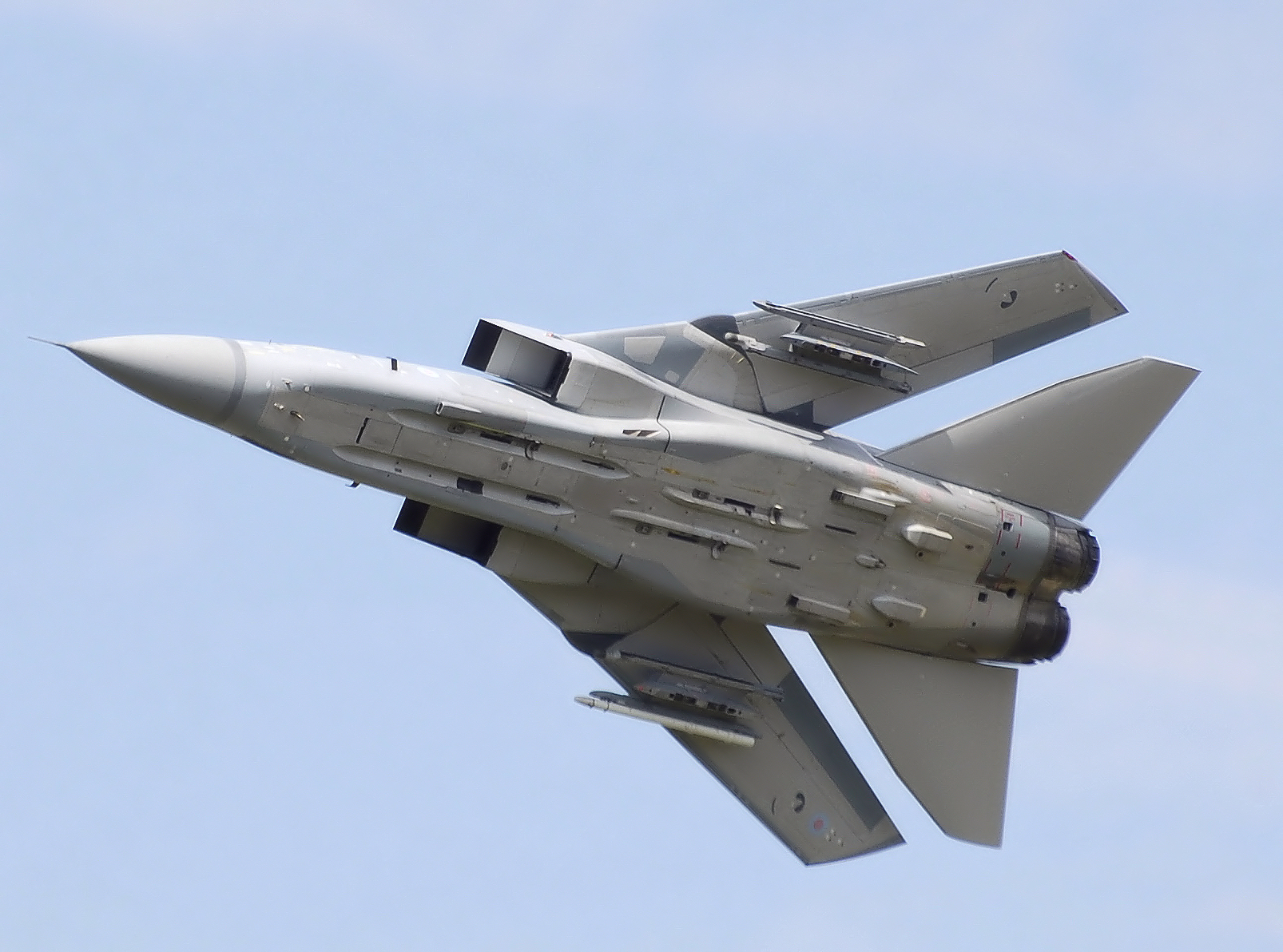
In swept wing configuration

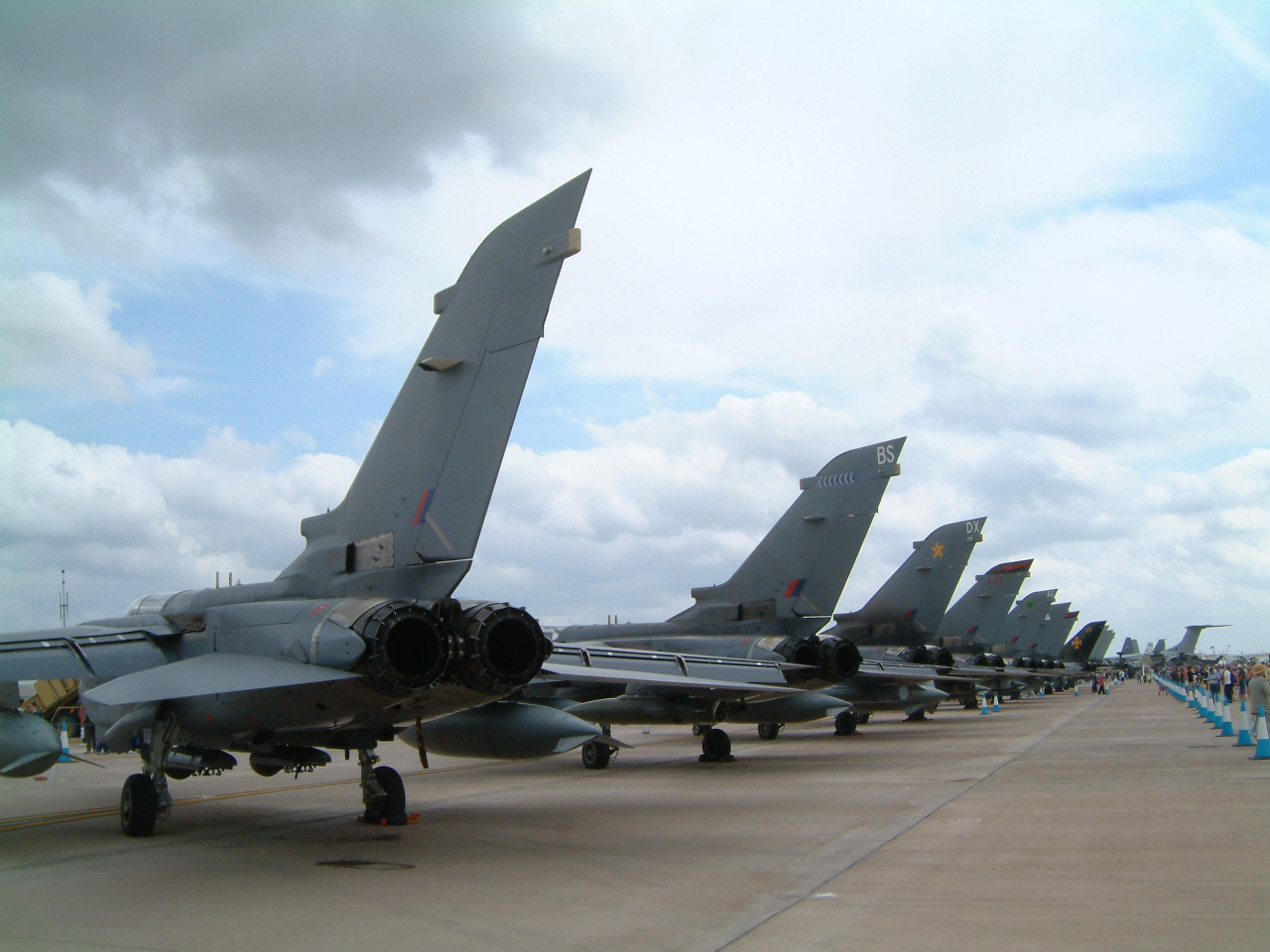
RAF aircraft

The aircraft was originally known as the MRA-75, the MRCA and the ACA. Design work began in May 1969. By 1970, it was known as the Panavia 100, with the two-seat version being the Panavia 200. The RAF was to have the two-seat version. The avionics on the aircraft were developed by another ad hoc European company, Avionica, formed by Elliott (UK), Elektronik System (West Germany) and SIA (Italy).

The Tornado first flew in 1974. The first director of flight operations was Wing Commander Roland Beamont. Marketing of the plane was directed by Jeffrey Quill from 1969–76, who had been head of marketing at SEPECAT. The RAF flew a variant, the Panavia Tornado ADV, with a larger GEC-Marconi AI.24 Foxhunter radar, implemented in the mid-1970s with the involvement of Air Chief Marshal Sir Neil Wheeler. Another variant was the Tornado ECR (Electronic Combat and Reconnaissance), developed for the Luftwaffe, and proposed to be sold to the US in 1985. Its all-weather capabilities at the time were unmatched in the world.

The Tornado aircraft is expected to remain in service until at least 2025 (a milestone which it has since passed), which is more than fifty years since it first flew. The Tornado for the RAF and RSAF was assembled at Warton Aerodrome, then owned by British Aerospace.

=== Common organisations ===
The Tornado management model was adopted for the European Fighter Aircraft, which is now in production as the Eurofighter Typhoon. The NAMMA was replaced by the NATO Eurofighter and Tornado Management Agency (NETMA), which is the prime contractor for the Eurofighter Weapon System and continued development of the Tornado.

In the 1970s, Euromissile was formed by West Germany and Aérospatiale of France. This company now has a similar mix to Panavia, and also includes the French, being known as MBDA.
