= NATO Eurofighter and Tornado Management Agency =

Prime customer and program management body

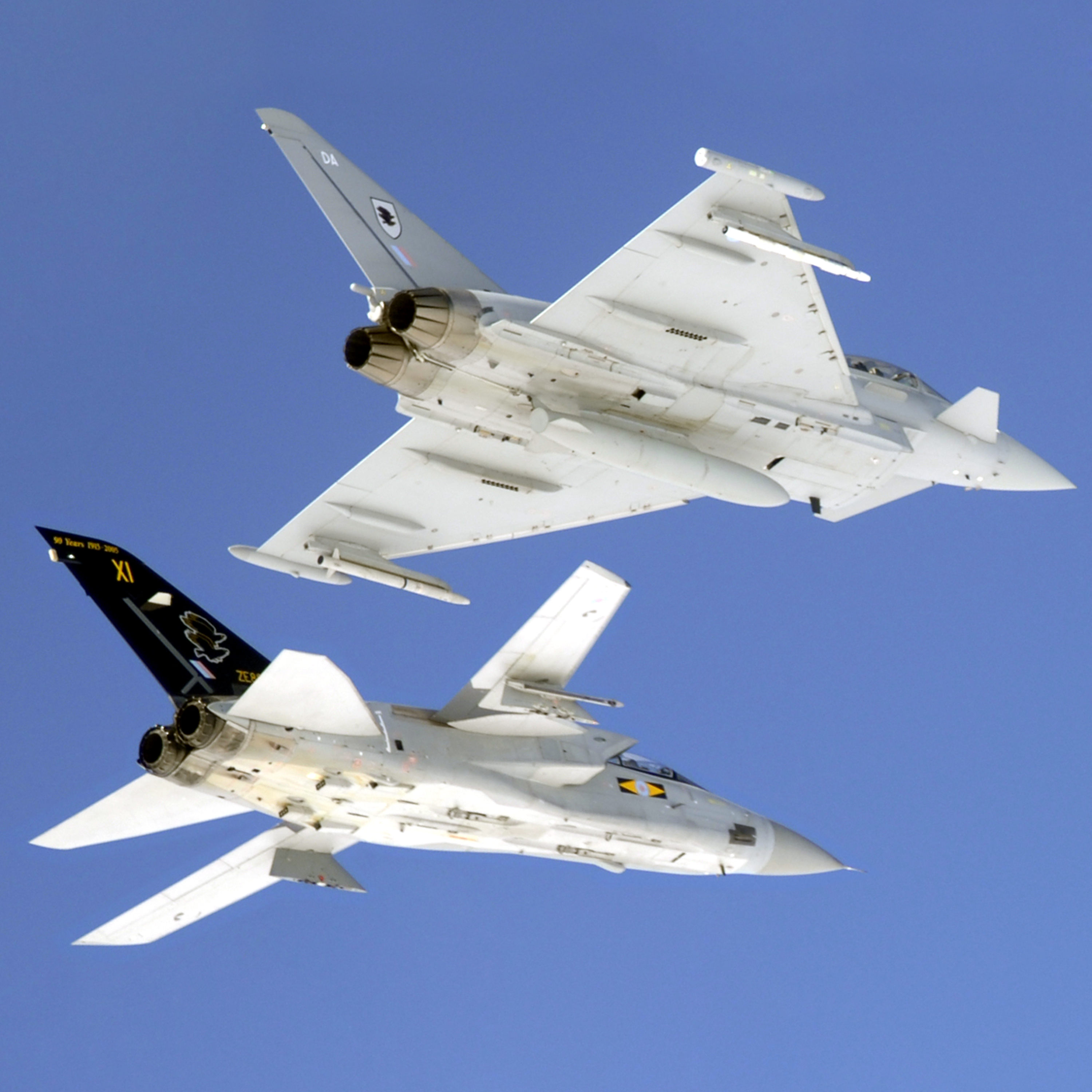
A Typhoon F2 fighter aircraft (top) from 11 Squadron, RAF Coningsby in close formation with a Tornado F3 aircraft formerly from the same Squadron.

The NATO Eurofighter 2000 and Tornado Management Agency (NETMA) is the prime customer and management body for two European multinational fighter jet programmes: the Eurofighter Typhoon and Panavia Tornado. Its offices are located in Hallbergmoos, Germany and it is staffed by civilian and military secondees from the participating states – the United Kingdom, Germany, Italy and Spain.

== History ==
NETMA was established in 1996 to replace two former organisations – the NATO Multirole Combat Aircraft Development and Production Management Agency (NAMMA) and the NATO EFA Development Production and Logistics Management Agency (NEFMA).

In 2023 Simon Ellard joined NETMA from the Royal Air Force as the new General Manager.

Miguel Ángel Martín Pérez served as General Manager of NETMA from 2020 until 2023. Other previous General Managers include Air Vice-Marshal Graham Farnell of the British Royal Air Force and Lt. General Gabriele Salvestroni of the Italian Air Force.
