= British Aerospace EAP =

Technology demonstrator aircraft

EAP
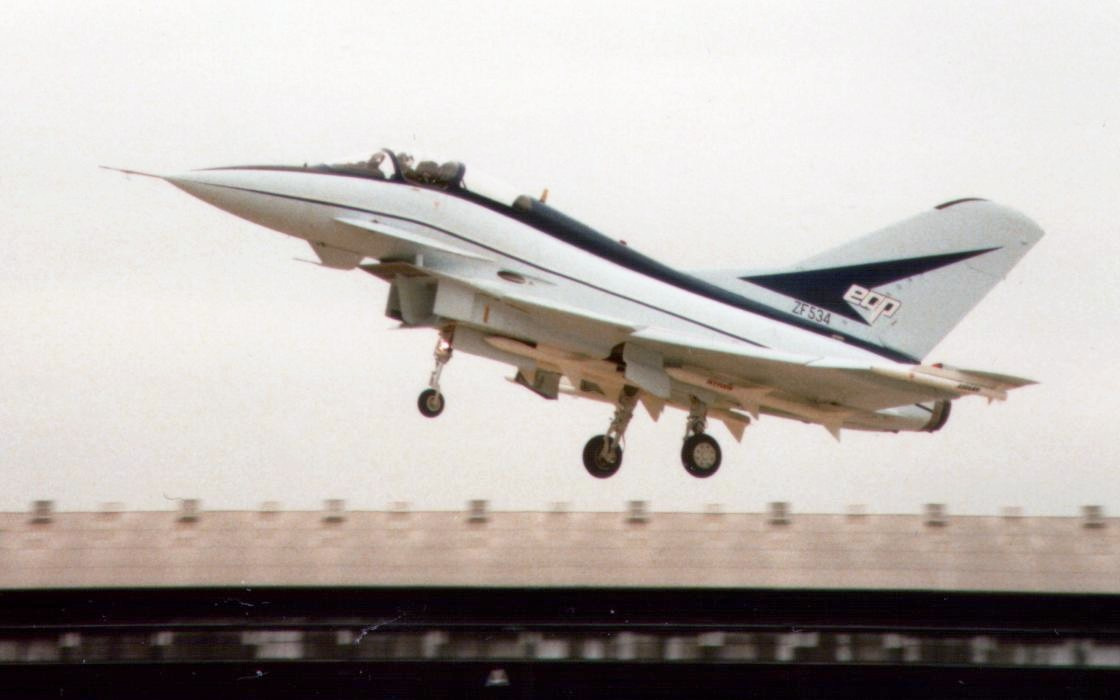
- EAP at the Farnborough Air Show, 1986

General information
- Type: Private venture demonstrator fighter
- National origin: United Kingdom
- Manufacturer: British Aerospace
- Status: On display at RAF Cosford
- Primary user: British Aerospace
- Number built: 1

History
- First flight: 8 August 1986
- Retired: 1 May 1991
- Developed into: Eurofighter Typhoon

The British Aerospace EAP (standing for Experimental Aircraft Programme) is a British technology demonstrator aircraft developed by aviation company British Aerospace (BAe) as a private venture. It was designed to research technologies to be used for a future European combat aircraft, and for the multinational Eurofighter Typhoon.

The EAP has its roots within the earlier Agile Combat Aircraft (ACA), a collaborative initiative studying advanced technologies to produce more capable fighter aircraft. Upon the announcement of the EAP during October 1983, it was intended to be a multinational European effort; however, neither West Germany nor Italy would ultimately contribute financially, thus the programme relied upon a combination of British public and British and European private funding instead. Having been manufactured in sections across multiple facilities, the sole EAP aircraft (serial ZF534) was rolled out during April 1986. Performing its maiden flight on 8 August 1986, the EAP would fly over 250 sorties prior to its grounding on 1 May 1991, by which point the aircraft had fulfilled its intended purpose as a development aid.

The British House of Commons Accounts Committee credited the EAP with reducing the development of the Eurofighter by a year for a saving of £850 million.

During the second half of 1991, the Aeronautical and Automotive Engineering department of Loughborough University received the EAP aircraft, where it was used as a static instructional aid in the teaching of Aeronautical Engineering students for many years. In early 2012, in response to a request from the Royal Air Force (RAF), the EAP was transported to the Royal Air Force Museum Cosford; it has since been reassembled and put on public display in the museum's collection.

== Design and development ==
=== Background ===
The origins of the EAP can be found within the Agile Combat Aircraft (ACA) programme performed by British Aerospace (BAe) during the late 1970s and early 1980s. It is known that ACA had involved the combining of several years of private venture research conducted by BAe, costed at around £25 million, together with similar contemporary studies that had been performed by West German aircraft manufacturer Messerschmitt-Bölkow-Blohm (MBB) (such as the TKF-90 project) and Italian aviation company Aeritalia. Seeking to develop a new generation of fighter aircraft to equip the various air forces of Western Europe, the three companies had recognised the benefits of cooperation and the sharing of critical technologies to achieve this goal. Technologies which became central to the ACA included full-authority digital fly-by-wire controls, which would enable a significantly aerodynamically unstable aircraft to be flown, and multiple advanced manufacturing processes.

During the early 1980s, it was recognised that, due to the high extent of cutting-edge technologies involved, a reasonable risk reduction measure ahead of launching a full-scale production programme would be the completion of several technology demonstrator aircraft. During the 1982 Farnborough Airshow, a mockup of the ACA was publicly exhibited; this mockup also appeared at the Paris Air Show in May 1983. It was at the 1983 Paris Air Show that the official launch of the Experimental Aircraft Programme (EAP), under which a pair of technology demonstrators would be manufactured and flown, was announced. At the programme's launch, it was intended for the EAP to be a partnership between Britain and several of its European neighbours, including West Germany and Italy.

The initial project definition of what became the Eurofighter Typhoon commenced shortly after the EAP project was initiated. While the similarity between the EAP and the Eurofighter Typhoon is striking, there are numerous important design differences; the cranked delta wings of the EAP have been replaced with a straight delta, while the size of the fin has been much reduced and the rectangular air intake of the prototype has been replaced with one with a "smiling" configuration.

=== Funding and construction ===
The EAP was intended to be financed by multiple countries. Early on, the British Government announced that it would make a financial contribution to the EAP; however, funding would not prove to be forthcoming from the West German government, which heavily contributed to the decision to cancel the planned second airframe prior to major work commencing. The UK Ministry of Defence (MOD) reportedly invested almost £80m into the EAP. The initiative became exclusively funded by the UK, from both the public and the private sector, the latter in the form of the aviation industry itself. Following German government instructions to withdraw support, MBB withdrew but other German companies stayed in.

Assembly of the sole EAP aircraft was performed within British Aerospace's development facility (No. 2 Hangar) at Warton. Structurally, it comprised three major fuselage structures; front, centre & rear. The front fuselage contained many innovative structures in Carbon-fiber-reinforced polymer composites and aluminium-lithium alloy, while the centre and rear fuselage structures were conventional - a result of MBB withdrawal. The right hand wing assembly, manufactured at BAe's Samlesbury plant, was a co-bonded carbon fibre composite assembly, proving new tooling and manufacturing techniques which were put to good use later on the Eurofighter programme. The left hand wing assembly was manufactured at the Corso Marche facility of Aeritalia in Turin. The foreplanes were manufactured in carbon composite at Preston/Samlesbury; detail design and manufacture of the windscreen and canopy assemblies was done by Aerostructures Hamble, in Southampton.

The EAP was designed to research technologies to be used for a future European combat aircraft. Accordingly, the EAP was fitted with a variety of advanced electronic equipment, including three cathode-ray tube (CRT) displays and a Head-up display (HUD) similar to the American General Dynamics F-16 Fighting Falcon. The flight controls were Hands On Throttle-And-Stick (HOTAS)-compatible and incorporated a departure prevention system. Power was provided by a pair of Turbo-Union RB199-104 afterburning turbofans, previously used as the Panavia Tornado ADV's powerplant. To reduce costs, the rear fuselage and tailfin of a Tornado was used as the basis of the unit that was eventually fitted to the EAP prototype. Due to its experimental nature, no operational armaments or military systems were ever installed; several dummy munitions were routinely fitted in low-drag positions however. The radome was used for flight test instrumentation.

=== Flight testing ===
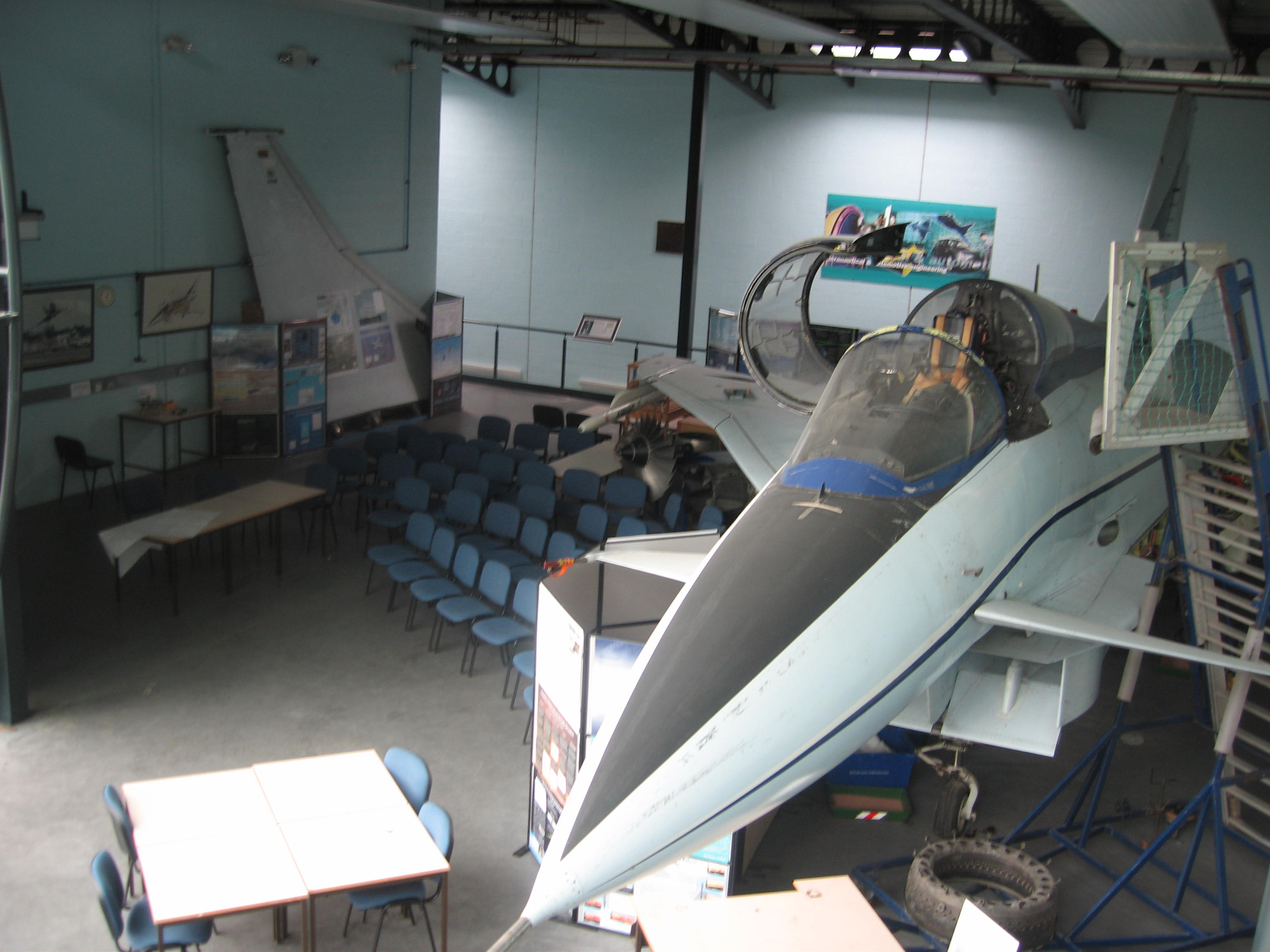
EAP at Loughborough University

On 18 April 1986, the sole EAP aircraft (serial ZF534) was officially rolled out at BAe's Warton facility, being unveiled by BAe Chief Executive Sir Raymond Lygo. On 8 August 1986, after multiple delays due to unfavourable weather conditions, the EAP conducted its maiden flight, flown by BAe’s Executive Director of Flight Operations David Eagles. During this initial flight, it reportedly attained a maximum speed of Mach 1.1, exceeding the speed of sound, as well as altitudes of up to 30,000ft. Nine further flights were performed within a week of the maiden flight. The EAP was shown publicly for the first time at Farnborough in September.

During its initial months of flight, the EAP was principally involved in early proving flights. In addition to testing the aircraft itself, test frequently involved using the EAP in its capacity as a flying testbed for investigating and validating around 36 individual technological developments. During one test flight in September 1986, all cockpit displays went down due to computer failure, leading to the aircraft returning safely to Warton using backup instrumentation; the cause was quickly identified and resolved. During May 1987, the main phase of the test flight programme commenced, by which point the EAP had been equipped with an anti-spin parachute and the control laws also upgraded to Paris Standard, featuring angle-of-attack and side-slip feedback.

Following the initial flights of the type, in addition to continuing flight testing, an increasing emphasis was placed on the performance of pre-arranged aerial displays at various airshows; in such a capacity, the EAP would demonstrate its capabilities, such as its high level of agility, to a wide audience, often consisting of both the general public and figures interested in the prospective production programme. The EAP's one hundredth flight was performed during the 1987 Paris Air Show. During December 1987, the third phase of test flying commenced, after which an increasing emphasis was placed upon testing various technologies for the future Eurofighter Typhoon, such as the direct voice input interface and multi-function displays. The flight control laws would also be progressively refined, improving the handling and enabling the EAP to reach a recorded maximum speed of Mach 2.0 during its latter years of operation; the aircraft also demonstrated an ability to maintain controlled flight while flown at very high angles of attack, reportedly in excess of 35 degrees. The final round of test flights involved exploring the functionality of the in-flight flutter and structural coupling mode.

By the end of its flying career, the EAP had reportedly flown 259 sorties and accumulated a total of 195 flight hours. According to aviation historian Nick Sturgess, the EAP's flight testing had contributed heavily to the development of computerised flight control systems, new construction techniques, and the exploration of advanced aerodynamics. Chris Boardman, a managing director at BAe's successor company, BAE Systems, commented in 2013 that the EAP was fundamentally important to defining and developing both the characteristics and capabilities of the subsequent Eurofighter Typhoon.

== Preservation ==
On 1 May 1991, the sole EAP aircraft was retired from the flight test programme; it was subsequently transported to the display area of the Aeronautical and Automotive Engineering department of Loughborough University. For the next two decades it was used as an instructional aid for teaching Aeronautical Engineering students the components and systems of a modern fighter jet. For this purpose, its port wing had been removed at the root, providing a better view of both the aerofoil cross-section and several internal components. Furthermore, other components had been removed from the aircraft and could be separately examined.

On 26 March 2012, the EAP departed the Aeronautical & Automotive Engineering Department at Loughborough University following the RAF's request to have the aircraft displayed at the Royal Air Force Museum Cosford instead. During November 2013, following limited restoration work, the reconstituted EAP was placed on public display as part of the museum’s Test Flight collection.

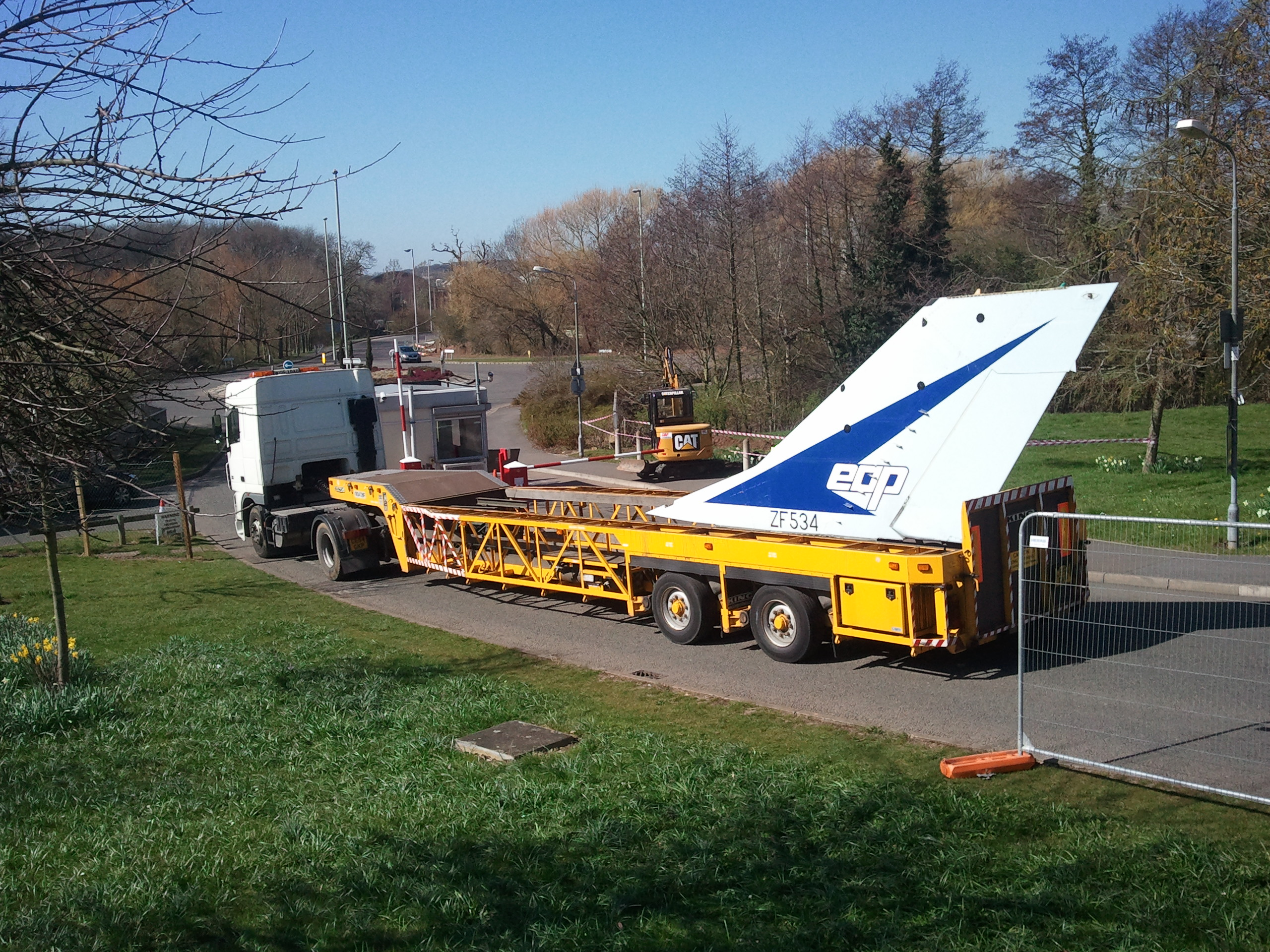
Fin of disassembled EAP in transit

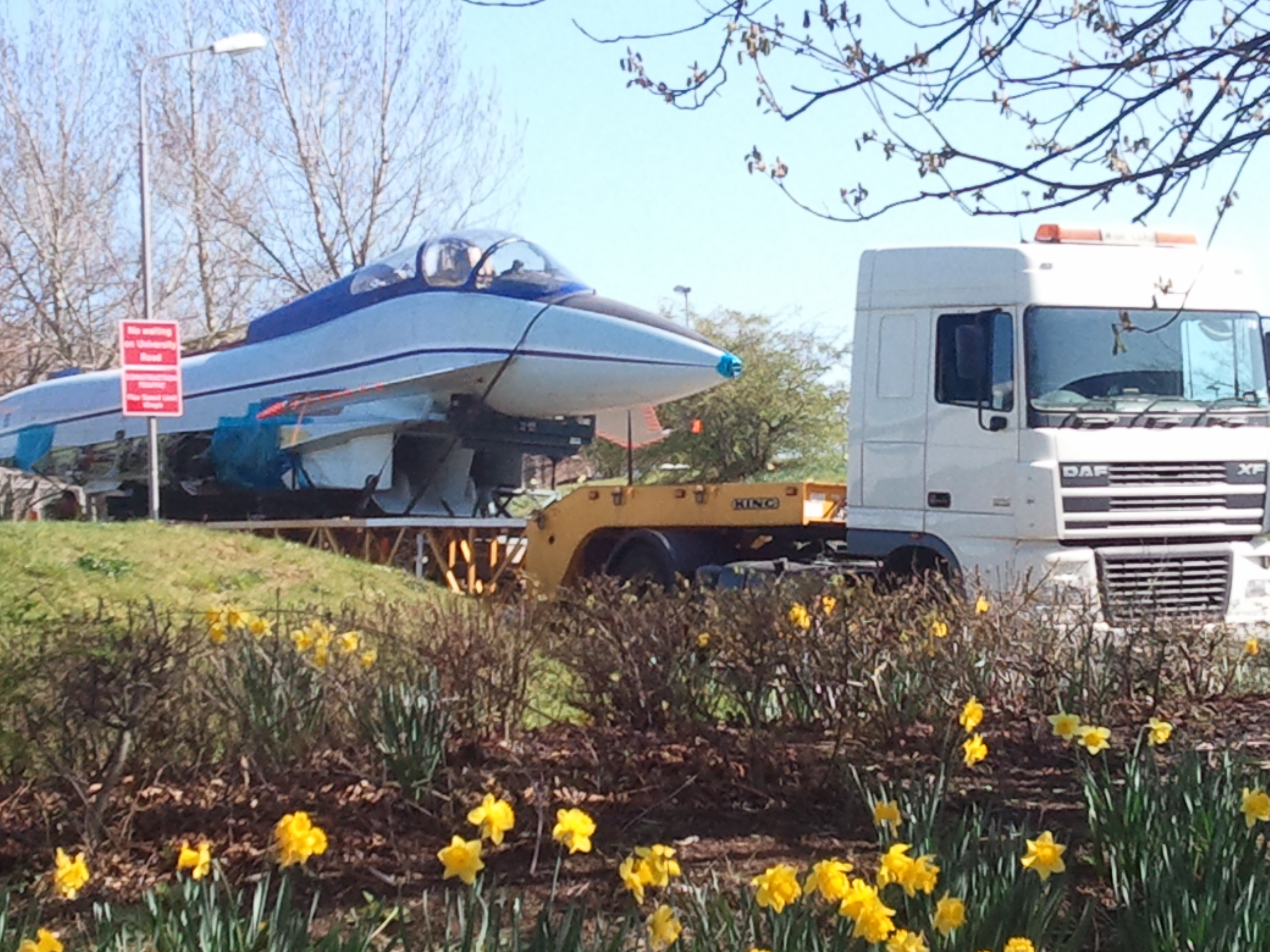
The nose

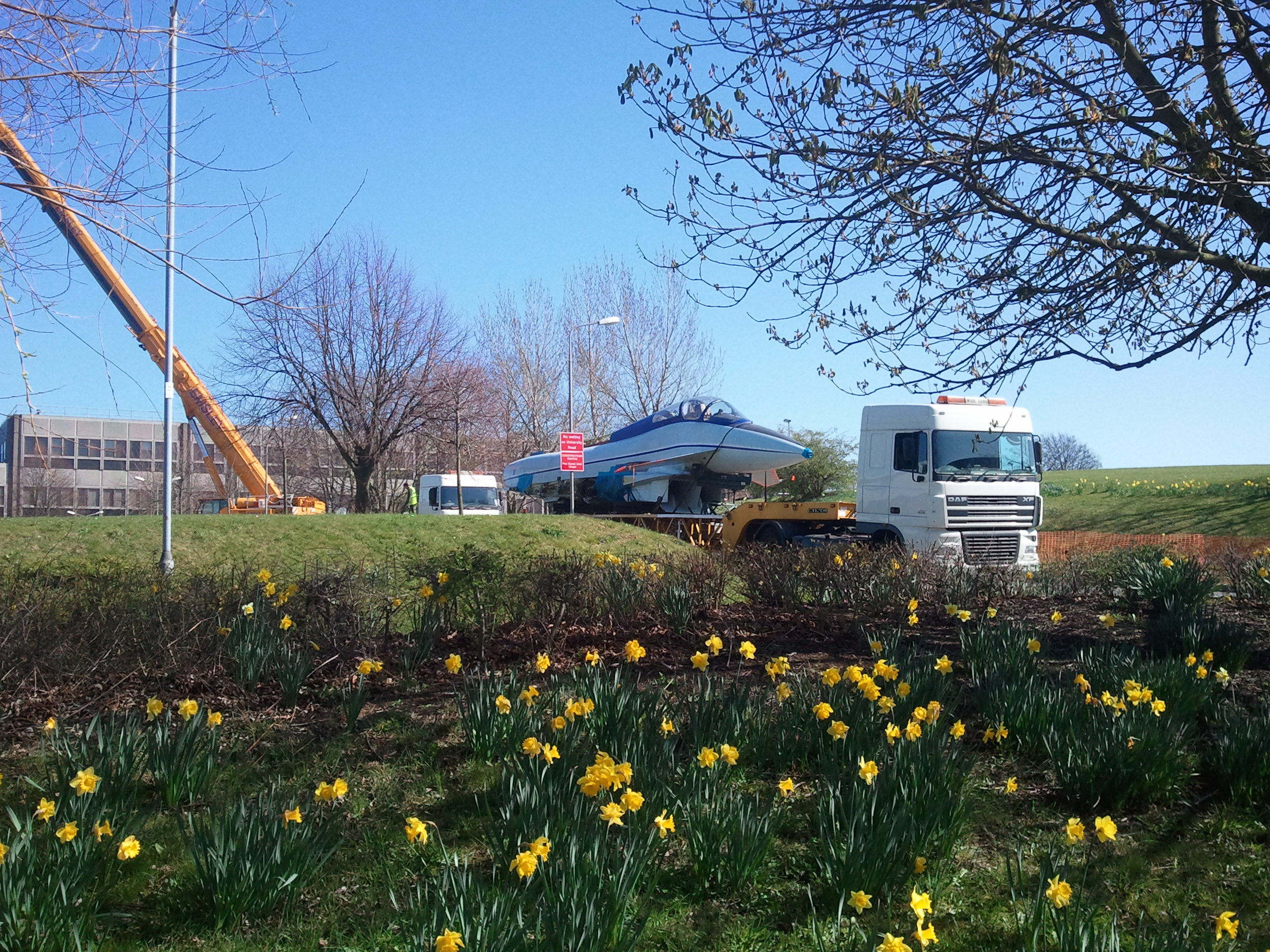
The front

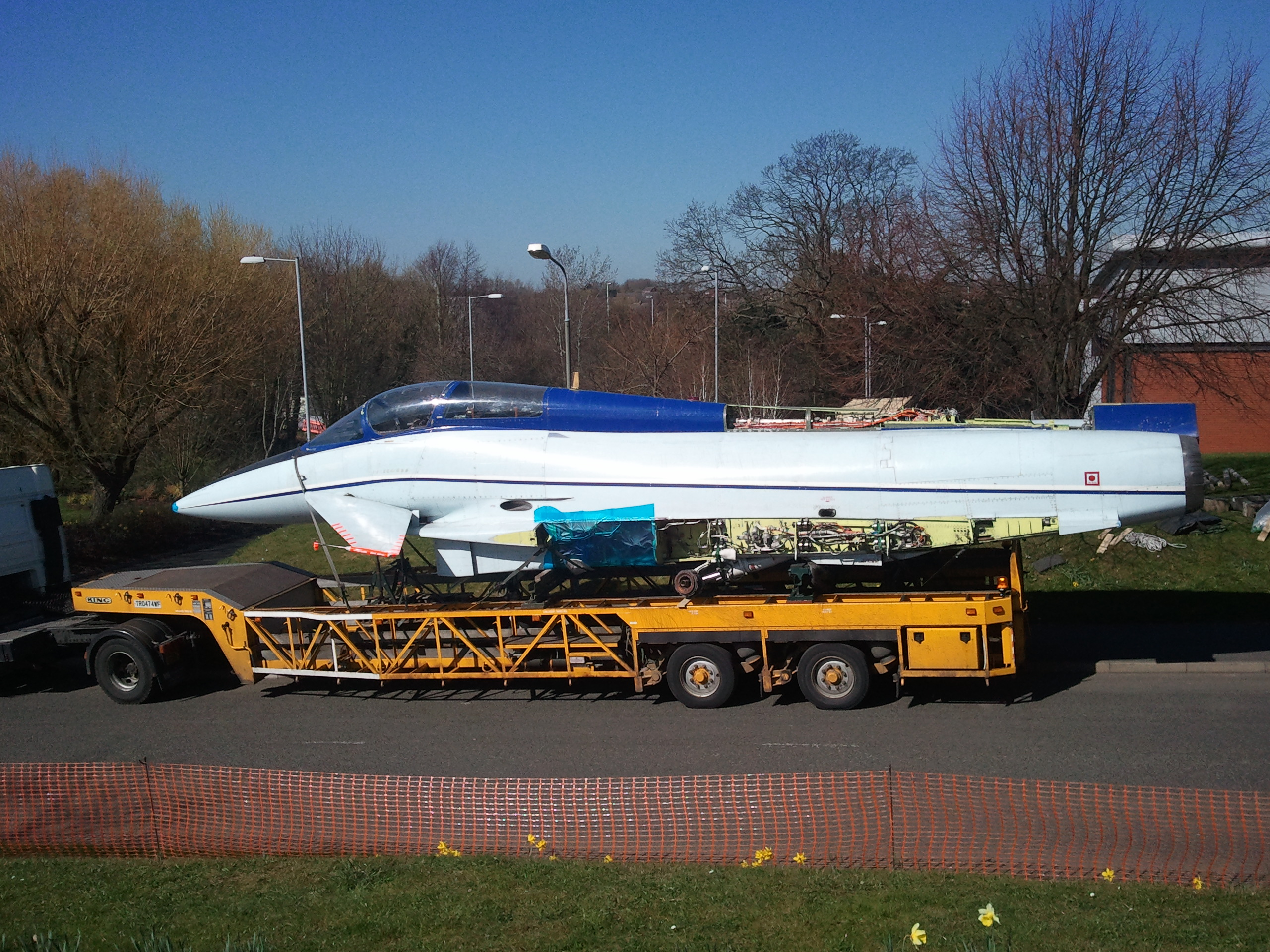
Side view

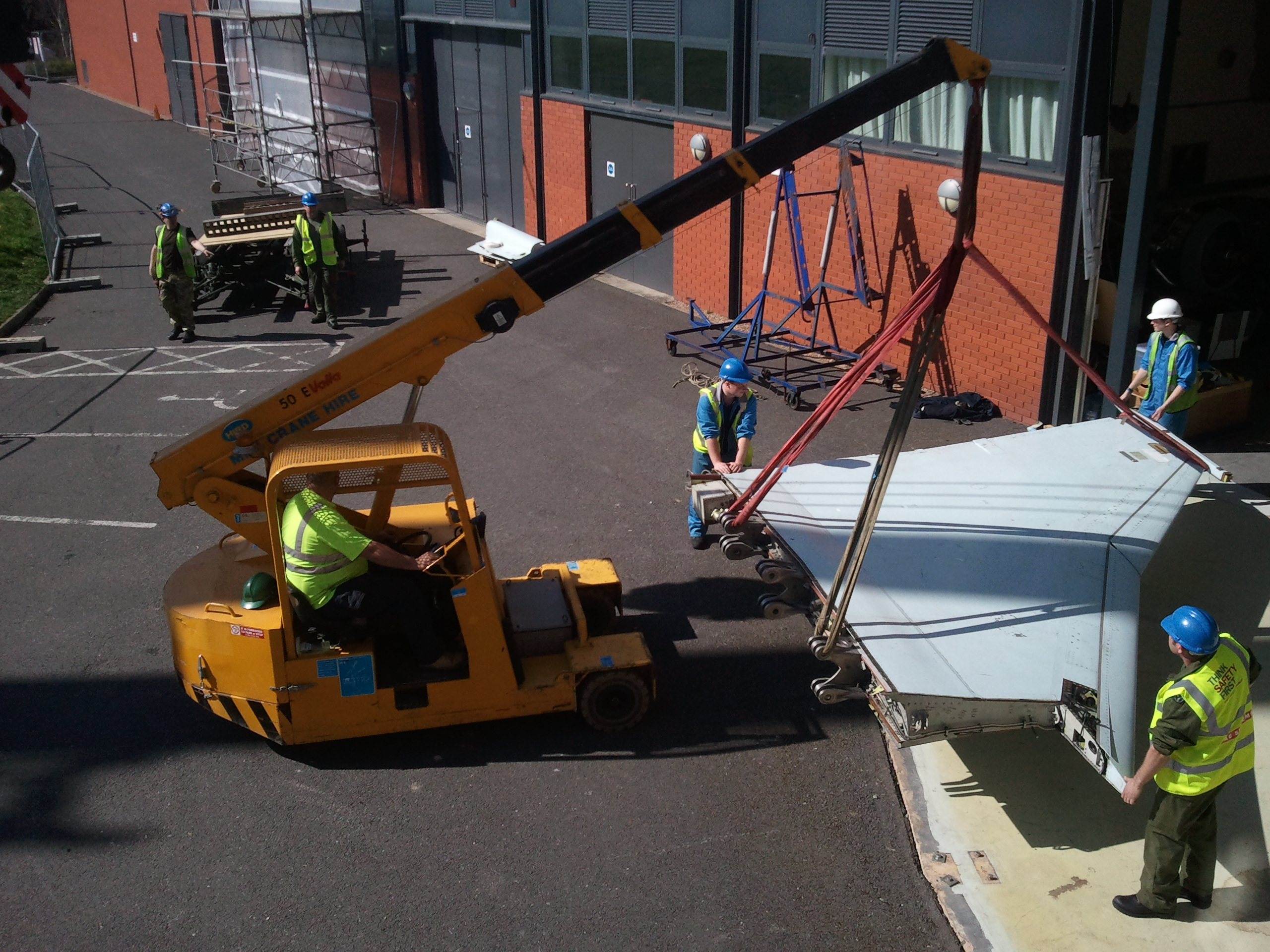
Port wing

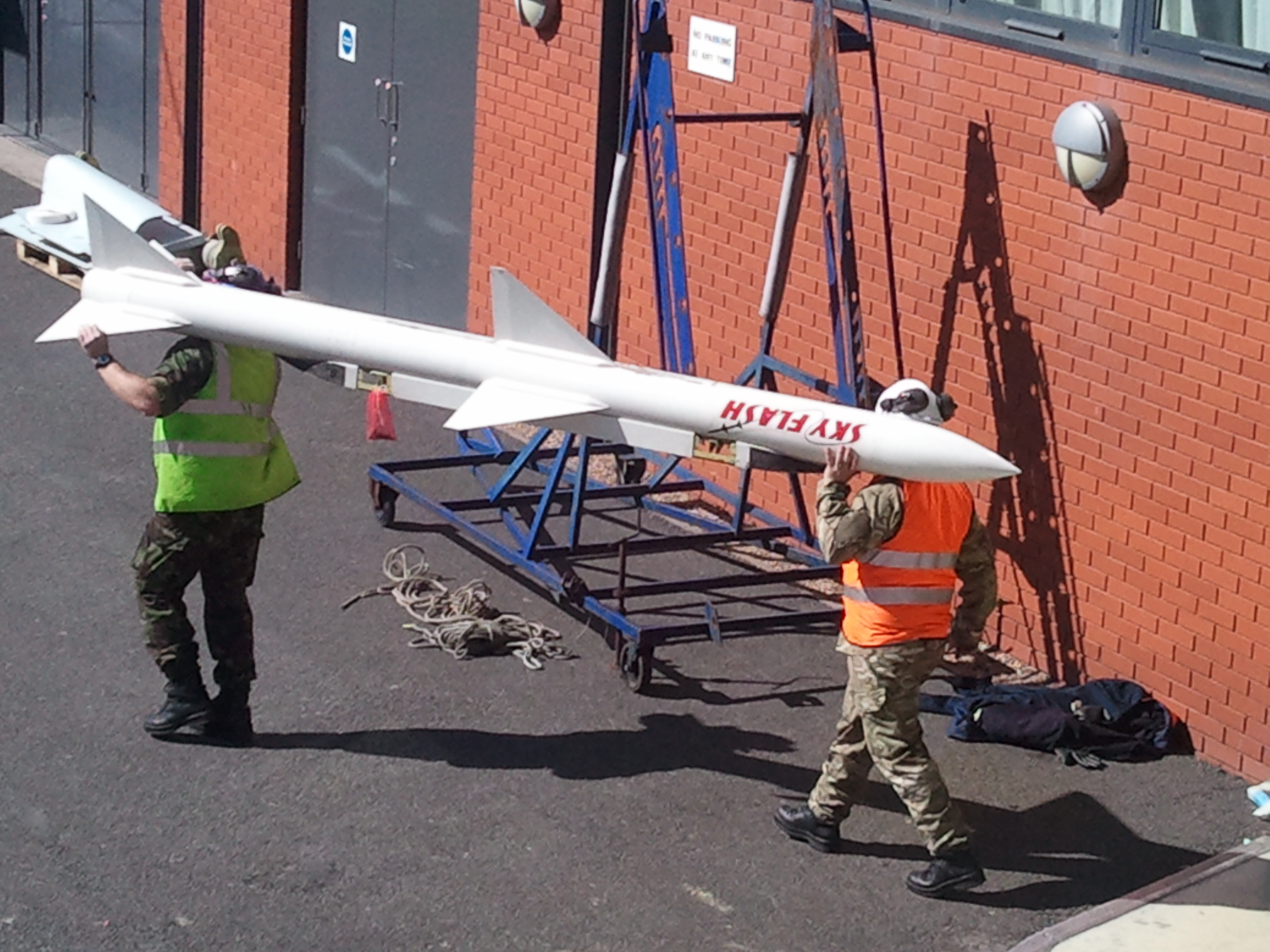
Dummy Skyflash missile

== Specifications (EAP) ==
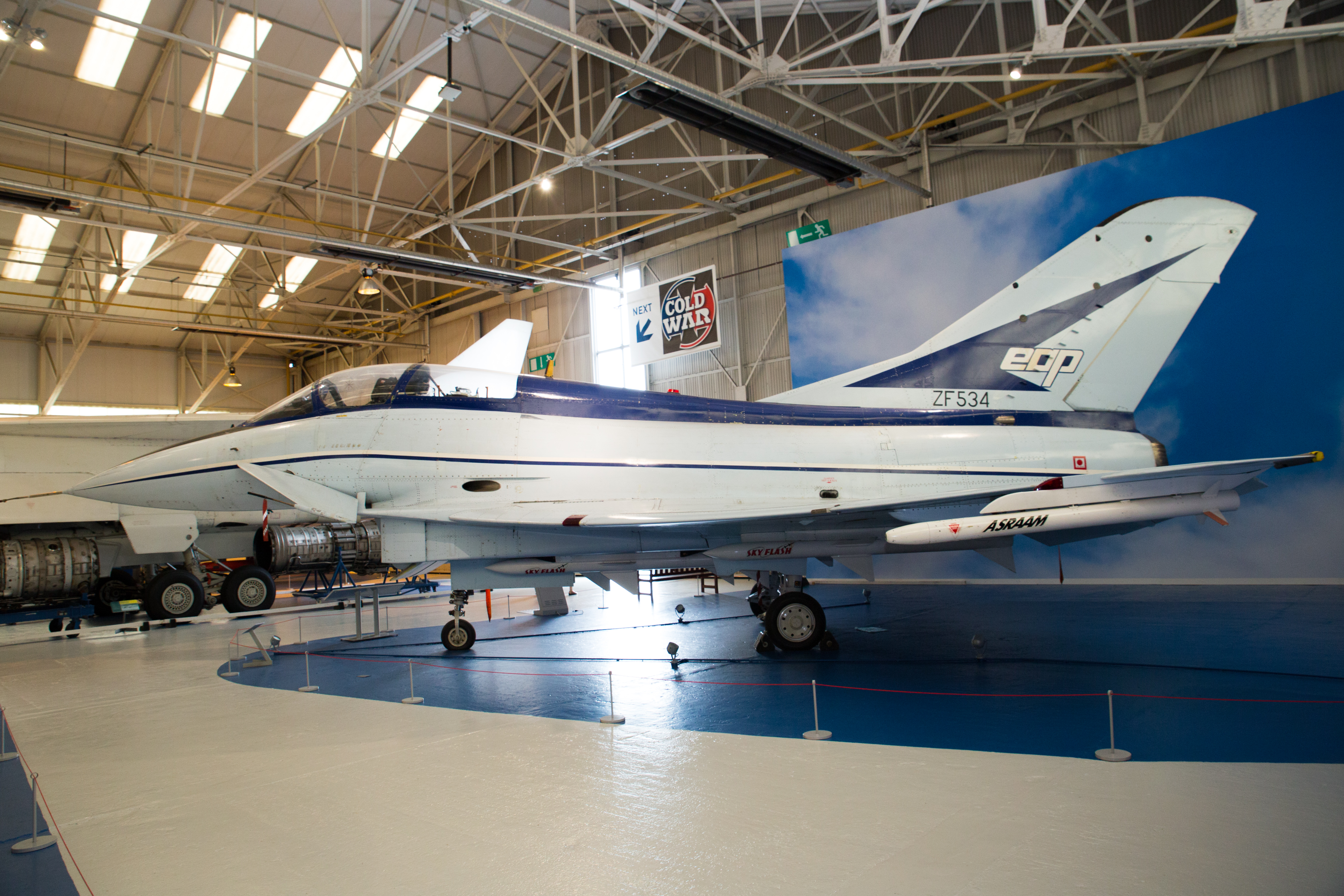
EAP at Royal Air Force Museum Cosford, 2016

Data from Jane's All The World's Aircraft 1988–89, BAE Systems

General characteristics

- Crew: 1
- Length: 48 ft 2.75 in (14.7003 m)
- Wingspan: 38 ft 7 in (11.76 m)
- Height: 18 ft 1.5 in (5.525 m)
- Wing area: 560 sq ft (52 m^{2})
- Empty weight: 22,050 lb (10,002 kg)
- Max takeoff weight: 32,000 lb (14,515 kg)
- Powerplant: 2 × Turbo-Union RB199-104D 3-spool turbofan engine, 9,000 lbf (40 kN) thrust each dry, 17,000 lbf (76 kN) with afterburner

Performance

- Maximum speed: Mach 2 at 11,000 m (36,100 ft)
- Service ceiling: 60,000 ft (18,000 m)

== See also ==
Related development

- Eurofighter Typhoon
