= Turbo-Union RB199 =

Aircraft turbofan jet engine

RB199
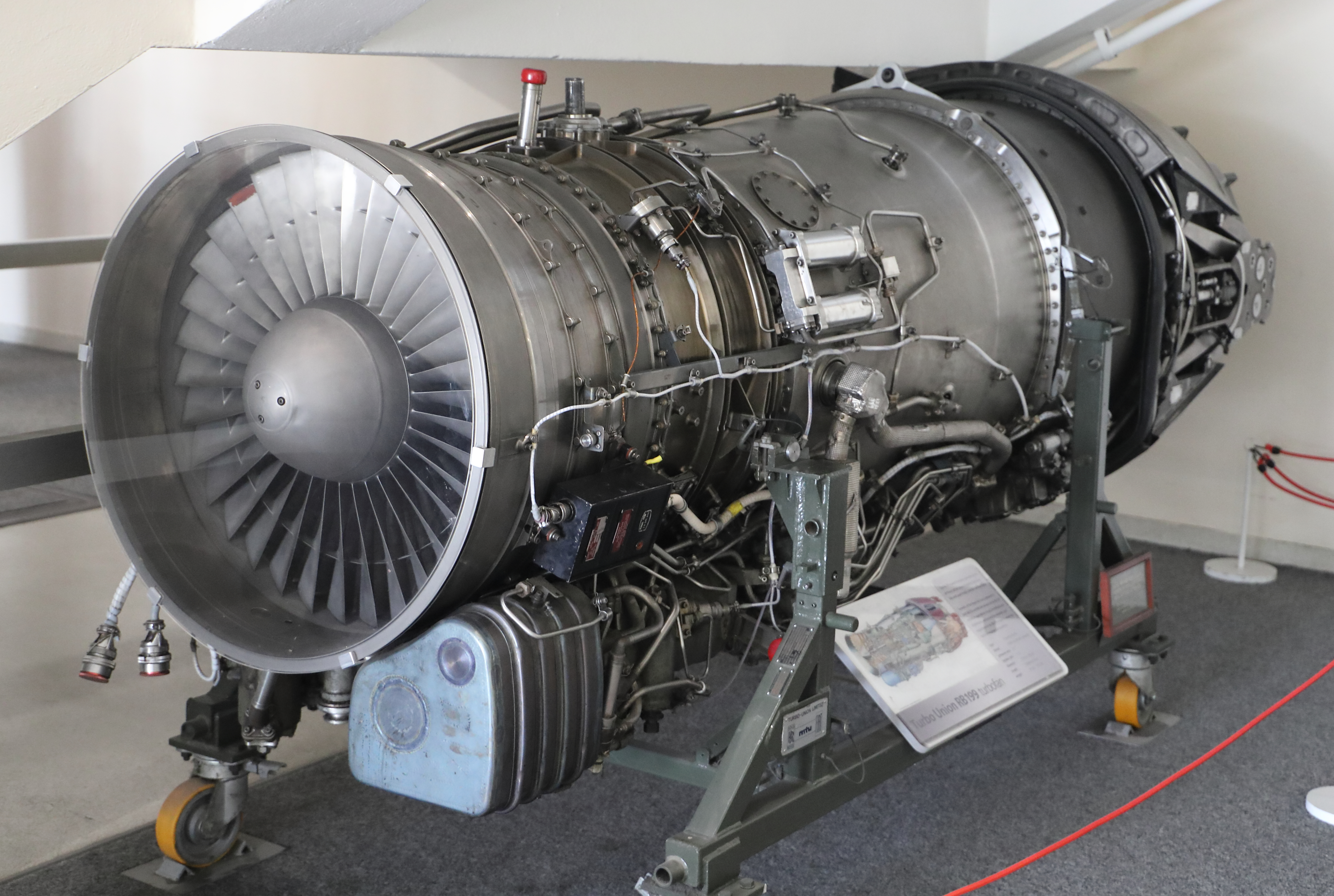
- RB199 at the Royal Air Force Museum Hendon
- Type: Turbofan
- Manufacturer: Turbo-Union
- First run: 1971
- Major applications: Panavia Tornado

The Turbo-Union RB199 is a turbofan jet engine designed and built in the early 1970s by Turbo-Union, a joint venture between Rolls-Royce, MTU and Aeritalia.

The only production application was the Panavia Tornado, but it was used in the British Aerospace EAP whose 1st flight was on 8 August 1986 from Warton, without use of a spare engine on its total 259 flights, and is now in RAF Cosford Museum. It was also used in the first two Prototypes of the Eurofighter Typhoon, whose 1st flight, by DA1, was from Manching, Bavaria on 27 March 1994, and for a further two years before the EJ200 engines were installed - good reliability meant the spare RB199 engine supplied was never used.

== Design and development ==
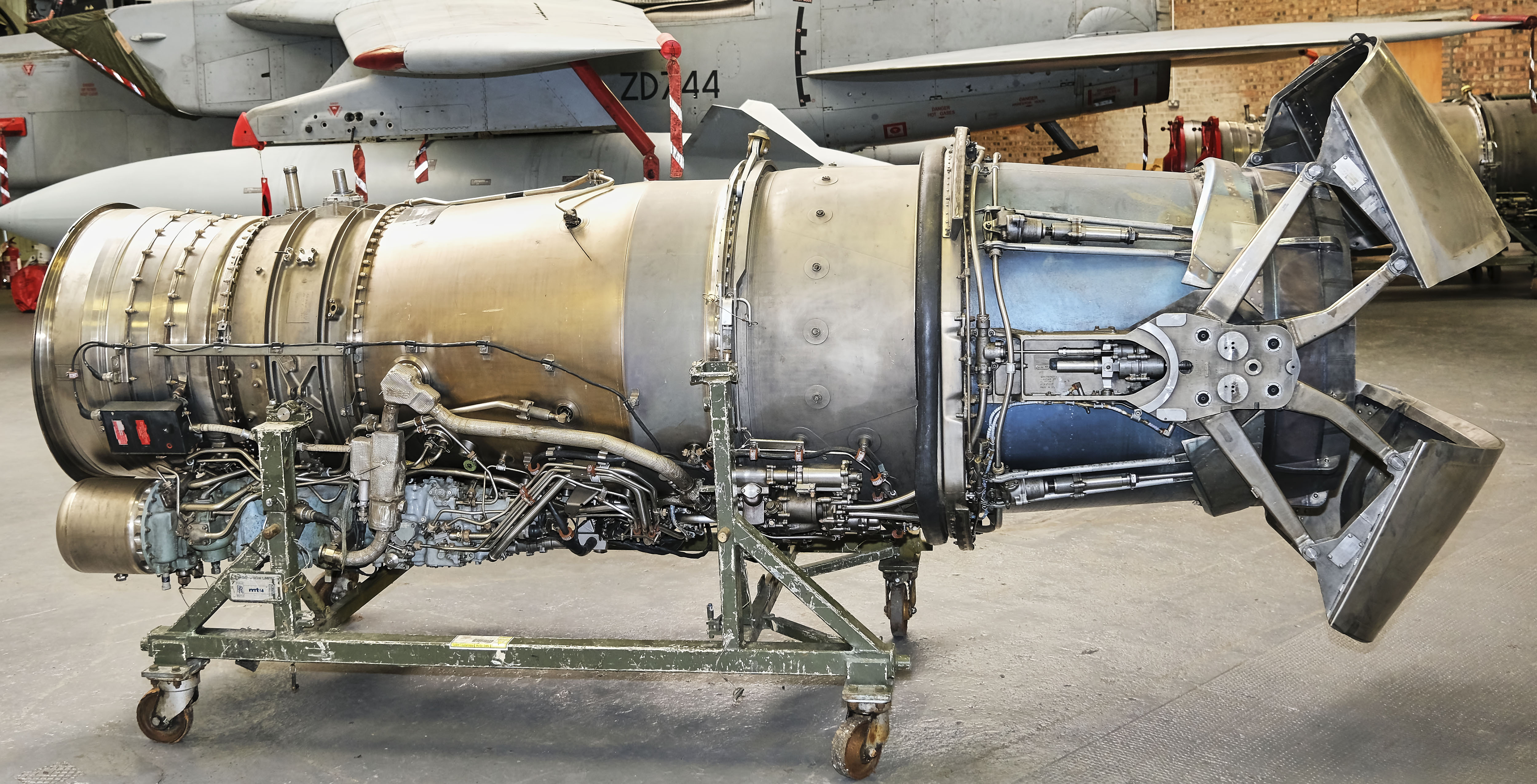
Turbo Union RB199 turbofan engine on display at Montrose Air Station Heritage Centre

The RB199 originated with a requirement, in 1969, to power a new European multirole combat aircraft (MRCA) called the Panavia MRCA. The engine requirements to meet the Panavia MRCA specification were significant advances over current engines in thrust-to-weight ratio, fuel consumption and size. The final selection of the engine for the MRCA was made between a new European collaboration, Turbo Union, with the RB199, and Pratt & Whitney who proposed the JTF16. The Panavia MRCA would later be called the Panavia Tornado.

Advanced engine studies at Bristol Siddeley had already been done to support the BAC/Dassault AFVG and were based on the Pegasus two-spool arrangement. At Rolls-Royce, where the three-shaft RB211 engine was in development, three shafts were considered better. Rolls-Royce took over Bristol Siddeley in 1966 so the configuration for the RB199 was decided, a three-shaft engine, but fundamentally to Bristol's design and Bristol's higher technology.

The overall design concept for the international collaborative program, three shafts was decided by Rolls-Royce. The bypass ratio was chosen for long-range, with low fuel consumption, particularly when throttled back. The selected BPR also gave a higher reheat boost than with smaller values used on similar engines. The design of the individual modules was shared between Rolls-Royce, MTU and Fiat according to their existing expertise. Rolls-Royce designed the fan using scaled-down Pegasus knowledge, the combustor, the high pressure (HP) turbine and the reheat. The reheat used cold air combustion techniques, described by Arthur Sotheran and which were derived from their experience with ramjets and plenum chamber burning (PCB) in Pegasus front nozzles. Fiat had built turbines for the Viper so designed the low pressure (LP) turbine as well as the final nozzle. MTU designed the intermediate pressure(IP) and high pressure (HP) compressors, the IP turbine, and the thrust reverser. An interesting read from MTU's very early RB199 days can be found in https://aeroreport.de/en/aviation/rb199-development-the-engine-that-started-it-all.

A three-spool arrangement reduces the pressure ratio on each compressor so no variable stators were needed. To meet the short afterburner requirement an arrangement known as mix-then-burn, as used in current engines, was not possible because it was too long and heavy. The RB199 used a much shorter arrangement known as burn/mix.

The RB199 first ran on 27 September 1971 at Patchway, UK. It was flight-tested using an Avro Vulcan with the engine installed in a nacelle that was representative of the Tornado aircraft. The Vulcan first flew with the RB199 on 19apr1973 from Filton.

Service flying with the Royal Air Force, German Navy and German and Italian Air Forces in the European environment showed normal failure mechanisms for turbine blades, thermal fatigue, creep and high cycle fatigue (HCF) so development started on replacing the initial production equiaxed blades with single-crystal ones which last longer at high temperatures.

Sand ingestion tests had been done and passed as part of the qualification for service introduction but operating in desert conditions with the Royal Saudi Air Force produced new problems. Frequent flying in air carrying suspended sizes of sand particles caused deposits on the HP turbine blades from sand passing through the combustor. In addition, the dust carried with the cooling air through the blades blocked the cooling holes. Single crystal blades were being introduced to improve the life of the blades for the European operating conditions and revised cooling hole arrangements were introduced at the same time to reduce the detrimental effect of the suspended dust on blade cooling. With incorporation of these blade processing and cooling changes "Desert Storm" Tornado aircraft flew some of the most arduous missions of any Allied aircraft with reliability no worse than peacetime and no engines were rejected for HP Turbine blade defects."

Looking back on the RB199 program in 2002 Chief Engineer for the RB199, Dr.Gordon Lewis, concluded "The final production standard provided satisfactory reliability and performance."

== Variants and applications ==
Thrust given in kilonewtons (kN) and foot-pounds (lbf).

RB199 Mk 101
Initial variant powered first Tornado IDS deliveries, with 38.7 kN (8,700 lbf) (dry) 66.01 kN (14,840 lbf) with reheat afterburners.
RB199 Mk 103
Powering Tornado IDS strike versions, with a rating of 40.5 kN (dry) 71.2 kN (reheat)
RB199 Mk 104
Powering the Tornado F3 Air Defence Variant, with a rating of 40.5? kN (dry) 73? kN (reheat) airframe life limited to Mach 2.2, but thrust-drag capable of Mach 2.4+;RB 199 Mk104D
Derivative used on the BAe EAP.
RB199 Mk 105
Powering Tornado ECR versions and applicable to IDS, with a rating of 42.5 kN (dry) 74.3 kN (reheat)
RB199-122
A derivative of the Mk104 (originally designated Mk 104E), powering the first two prototypes of the Eurofighter Typhoon (DA1 and DA2) until the initial versions of the Eurojet EJ200 were available.

== Engines on display ==
- A Turbo-Union RB199 is on public display at the Royal Air Force Museum Cosford and Brooklands Museum Weybridge.
- A Turbo-Union RB199 is on public display at the Trenchard Museum, RAF Halton, Halton, Buckinghamshire. The engine is displayed with thrust reversers partially deployed.
- A Turbo-Union RB199 is on public display at the Morayvia Centre in Kinloss.
- A Turbo-Union RB199 is on public display at the Montrose Air Station Museum
- A Turbo-Union RB199 Mk.103 is on public display at the City of Norwich Aviation Museum in Horsham St Faith, Norfolk.
- An RB199 Mk 101 and an RB199 Mk104 are on display in the Deutsches Museum - Flugwerft Schleissheim near München.

== Specifications (RB199-104) ==
Data from Rolls-Royce and MTU.

==== General characteristics ====
- Type: Turbofan
- Length: 3,600 mm (142 in)
- Diameter: 720 mm (28.3 in)
- Dry weight: 976 kg (2,151 lb)

==== Components ====
- Compressor: 3-stage LP, 3-stage IP, 6-stage HP
- Turbine: Single-crystal HP, single-crystal IP, 2-stage LP

==== Performance ====
- Maximum thrust: 40 kN (9,100 lbf) dry, 73 kN (16,400 lbf) wet
- Turbine inlet temperature: ~1,600 K
- Thrust-to-weight ratio: 7.6 (with reheat, but thrust reverser mass included)

== See also ==
Comparable engines

- General Electric F404
- Klimov RD-33

Related lists

- List of aircraft engines
