= Timeline of the Eurofighter Typhoon =

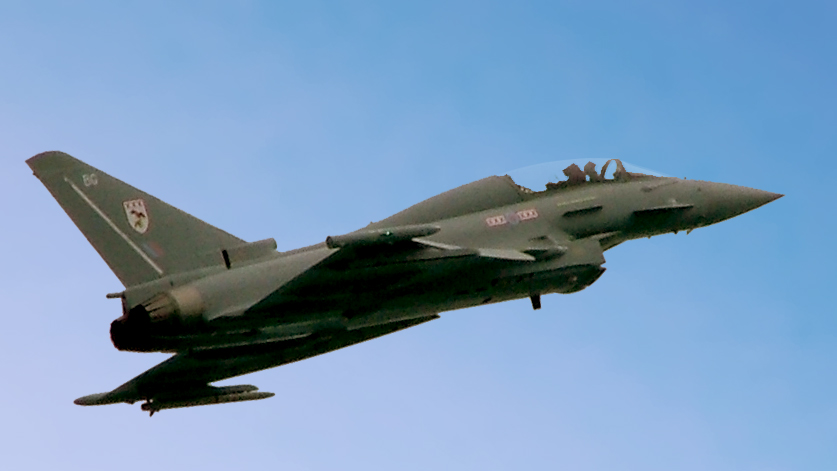
Two-seat Development Aircraft (DA4)

This is the timeline of the development of the Eurofighter Typhoon, a multirole fighter aircraft manufactured by a consortium of European aerospace manufacturers, Eurofighter GmbH, formed in 1983.

== 1970s ==
- 1972
  - Royal Air Force (RAF) issues Air Staff Target 396 (AST-396), a requirement for a STOVL aircraft to replace the Harrier and Jaguar fleets.
  - AST-403, specification revised for an air superiority fighter. STOVL requirement dropped and AST-409 lead to the development of Harrier GR5.
- Mid-1970s
  - France, Germany and the UK initiate the European Combat Aircraft (ECA) programme.
- 1979
  - Following differing requirements (particularly French requirement for carrier compatibility,) BAe and MBB propose the European Combat Fighter (ECF)

== 1980s ==
- 1981
  - Development of different national prototypes and continued differences over specification lead to cancellation of ECF programme.
  - Panavia partners (Germany, Italy and UK) launch Agile Combat Aircraft (ACA) programme. Following failure of Germany and Italy to fund development the UK MoD pays £80m prototype, the Experimental Aircraft Programme (EAP).
- 1983
  - May - contract for production of EAP prototype signed.
  - The UK, France, Germany, Italy and Spain launch Future European Fighter Aircraft (F/EFA) programme. Aircraft to have short take off and landing (STOL) and beyond visual range (BVR) capabilities.
- 1984
  - France reiterates requirement for carrier capable version. The UK, Germany and Italy opt out and establish new EFA programme.
- 1985
  - France officially withdraws, commences ACX project.
  - 27 October - EAP demonstrator rolled out at BAe Warton.
- 1986
  - June - Eurofighter GmbH established.
  - 8 August - EAP makes its first flight, piloted by David Eagles. Configuration closely matches final Eurofighter design.
  - Rolls-Royce, MTU Aero Engines, FiatAvio (now Avio) and ITP form EuroJet Turbo GmbH for development of EJ200.
- 1988
  - 23 November - contracts signed for production of demonstrator engines and airframes.

== 1990s ==
- 1990
  - EuroRADAR formed for development of ECR-90 (CAPTOR) radar.
- 1991
  - 1 May - last flight of EAP demonstrator.
- 1992
  - EuroDASS formed for development of defensive aids sub system (DASS.) Initially only UK and Italy participate. When Eurofighter enters service only RAF aircraft will exploit all capabilities of DASS.
  - July - Germany announces intention to withdraw from the DASS element. Negotiations begin to reduce costs. As a single engine aircraft is ruled out Germany decides to fit cheaper systems, e.g., F/A-18's APG-65 in place of ECR-90, and delay its service entry by two years. Germany eventually participates in all systems.
  - December - renamed Eurofighter 2000.
- 1994
  - 27 March - maiden flight of first development aircraft, DA1 from DASA at Manching with RB199 engines.
  - 6 April - maiden flight of second development aircraft, DA2 from BAe Warton. DA2 also flew with RB199s.
- 1995
  - 4 June - maiden flight of Italian DA3, the first with EJ200 engines.
- 1996
  - 31 August - Spanish DA6 becomes the first two-seater to fly.
- 1997
  - 27 January - first flight of DA7 from Turin.
  - 24 February - maiden flight of German DA5, first aircraft to be fitted with ECR-90.
  - 14 March - maiden flight of UK's DA4, the second two-seater and last of the seven development aircraft.
- 1998
  - January - first aerial refuelling trials, involving DA2 and an RAF VC10 tanker.
  - 30 January - NETMA and Eurofighter GmbH sign production and support contracts for 620 aircraft.
  - September - "Typhoon" name adopted, announced as strictly for export contracts. There is some controversy as the last aircraft to bear the name was the Hawker Typhoon, a World War II aircraft.
  - 18 December - Tranche 1 contract signed.
- 1999
  - Eurofighter International established as single contracting-management company to handle all export sales.

== 2000s ==
- 2000
  - 8 March - first export sale, 60 ordered and 30 options by Greece (but delayed, maybe cancelled).
  - 16 May - UK commits to MBDA Meteor BVRAAM, leading to significant benefits for export prospects.
  - 7 July - DA2 emerges from ten month stand down with latest avionics. Finished in black (see below) to reduce cosmetic effect of 490 pressure transducers applied to airframe.
- 2002
  - 5 April - Instrumented Production Aircraft (IPA2) makes maiden flight from Turin.
  - 11 April - IPA 3 makes maiden flight from EADS Military Aircraft, Manching, Germany.
  - 15 April - IPA 1 makes maiden flight from BAE Warton.
  - 2 July - Austria announces acquisition of 24 Typhoons, later reduced to 18.
  - 23 July - "Typhoon" name officially adopted as in-service name by four partner nations.
  - 21 November - DA6, flying out of Getafe, crashes. Twin engine failure is blamed.
- 2003
  - 13 February - first series production aircraft, GT001 flies from Manching. This is the first of Germany's 180 aircraft.
  - 14 February - in the space of just over an hour Italy's IT001 and Britain's BT001 make their maiden flights.
  - 17 February - Spain's ST001 flies from EADS Military Aircraft, Getafe, Spain.
  - 30 June - "type acceptance" signed, marking formal delivery of aircraft to the partner nations.
  - October - integration of Meteor begins.
- 2004
  - 27 June - two RAF Typhoon T1s depart UK for Singapore for marketing and training.
  - 15 December - UK confirms purchase of second batch of 89 aircraft, the last nation to commit to "Tranche 2" production of 236 aircraft.
- 2005
  - April - Singapore drops the Typhoon from its shortlist to supply the country's next generation fighter.
  - 16 December - the Aeronautica Militare Italiana (Italian Air Force) declares the Typhoon's initial operational capability and sets it on quick reaction alert from Grosseto Air Base.
  - 21 December - Saudi Arabia agrees to a purchase of an unspecified number of Typhoons with the UK Ministry of Defence.
- 2006
  - January - first AMI operational squadron formed.
  - February - first operational mission undertaken by the Italian Air Force as Eurofighter Typhoon defends the airspace over Turin during the 2006 Winter Olympics.
  - 31 March - first RAF operational squadron formed.
  - 18 August - announcement of Saudi Arabia signing a contract to buy 72 planes from the UK.
  - 3 October - 100th production aircraft delivered.
- 2007
  - 12 July - the first Eurofighter for Austria is delivered to the Austrian Air Force.
- 2008
  - 16 January - the first Tranche 2 Eurofighter Typhoon makes its first flight.
  - 22 October - first flight of Typhoon in Royal Saudi Air Force livery.
- 2009
  - 12 June - first Saudi Typhoons delivered.
  - 25 November - 200th Typhoon delivered.

== 2010s ==
- 2010
  - 24 August - a Spanish Eurofighter crashes in Spain, killing a Saudi pilot
  - 22 December - 250th Typhoon delivered.
- 2012
  - 21 December - Oman orders 12 Eurofighter Typhoons.
- 2013
  - 4 December - 400th Typhoon delivered.
- 2014
  - 12 December - First full trial installation of Brimstone missile.
- 2016
  - 5 April - Kuwait orders 28 Eurofighter Typhoons.
  - 13 July - Flights trials of E-Scan radar begin on Eurofighter Typhoon.
- 2017
  - 11 April - 500th Typhoon delivered.

== 2020s ==
- 2020
  - November 2020 - Germany ordered 30 single-seater and 8 twin-seater new Tranche 4 fighters for 5.4 billion euro. The contract for new Tranche 4 versions is to replace Tranche 1 versions currently in service. The latest order from Germany secures production of Eurofighter Typhoon until 2030.
- 2022-2023
  - Spain ordered 45 new Tranche 4 and 4+ (or Tranche 5 if available upon delivery) under the program Halcón in June 2022 and September 2023 for 6.5 billion euro.
