= Chris Worning =

Danish test pilot

Chris Worning FRAeS (born 9 August 1957) is a Danish test pilot, and a former chief test pilot of DASA in the late 1990s.

== Early life ==
He was born in Denmark.

== Career ==
=== Royal Danish Air Force ===
He joined the Royal Danish Air Force in November 1976. He trained in the United States, and left his training in November 1978. He flew from Skrydstrup Air Base (Vojens Airport) with the 730 Fighter Bomber Squadron.

In October 1981 he attended the Royal Danish Air Force Academy, returning to Skrydstrup Air Base in June 1984 to fly the F-16, flying with the 722th All Weather Fighter Attack Squadron. In 1987 he attended the Empire Test Pilots' School in Wiltshire in the UK, later becoming the F-16 project pilot for the RDAF from 1988 to 1991.

=== Test pilot ===
He left the RDAF in March 1991 to become a test pilot. He joined DASA in December 1995 at Manching in Germany. He is a Fellow of the Society of Experimental Test Pilots (SETP). He became project pilot for the Eurofighter Typhoon in July 1998. He has over 5800 hours of flying.

He appeared in the July 2003 BBC Four documentary Eurofighter: Weapon of Mass Construction, narrated by Veronika Hyks.

== Personal life ==
He is married.

== See also ==
- Paul Hopkins (pilot)
- Timeline of the Eurofighter Typhoon
