= EuroJet Turbo GmbH =

Engine manufacturing consortium

- Type: Joint venture
- Industry: Aeronautics
- Founded: 1986; 40 years ago
- Headquarters: Hallbergmoos, Freising (district), Bavaria, Germany
- Products: Aircraft engines
- Owners: Rolls-Royce Holdings; MTU Aero Engines; Avio; ITP Aero
- Website: www.eurojet.de

EuroJet Turbo GmbH is a multi-national engine manufacturing consortium. It is headquartered in Hallbergmoos, Germany.

The consortium was created in 1986 to manage the development, production, support, maintenance, support and sales of the EJ200, a military grade turbofan engine. The present partner companies involved are Rolls-Royce of the United Kingdom, Avio of Italy, ITP Aero of Spain and MTU Aero Engines of Germany. Its main product, the EJ200, principally powers the Eurofighter Typhoon fighter aircraft, it is also available for use on other platforms.

== History ==
Eurojet GmbH was formed in 1986 to manage the development, production, support, maintenance, support and sales of the EJ200 turbofan engine for the Eurofighter Typhoon. The selection of the EJ200 had some controversy attached to it at the time as, while Italy, West Germany and the UK had agreed to proceed, it had confirmed France's decision to withdraw itself from the programme. A major contributing factor for France's lack of involvement was an insistence that the Eurofighter be powered by a French-built engine, the SNECMA M88, which was viewed as not being as attractive or promising as the EJ200 to the other nations involved.

At the time of its establishment, the original partners in Eurojet GmbH were Rolls-Royce, MTU, Fiat and Sener. However, since then, Fiat's aircraft engine division has been demerged, becoming Avio. Sener's aircraft engine division is now ITP Aero, a wholly owned subsidiary of Rolls-Royce following its acquisition of Sener's stake in the firm.

On 30 January 1998, the first production contract was signed between Eurofighter GmbH, Eurojet and NETMA. In December 2006, Eurojet completed deliveries of the 363 EJ200s for the Tranche 1 Eurofighters. Tranche 2 aircraft require 519 EJ200s. As of December 2006, Eurojet was contracted to produce a total of 1,400 engines for the Eurofighter project.

The EJ200 engine combined the leading technologies from each of the four European companies, using advanced digital control and health monitoring; wide chord aerofoils and single crystal turbine blades; and a convergent / divergent exhaust nozzle to give excellent thrust-to-weight ratio, multimission capability, supercruise performance, low fuel consumption, low cost of ownership, modular construction and significant growth potential.

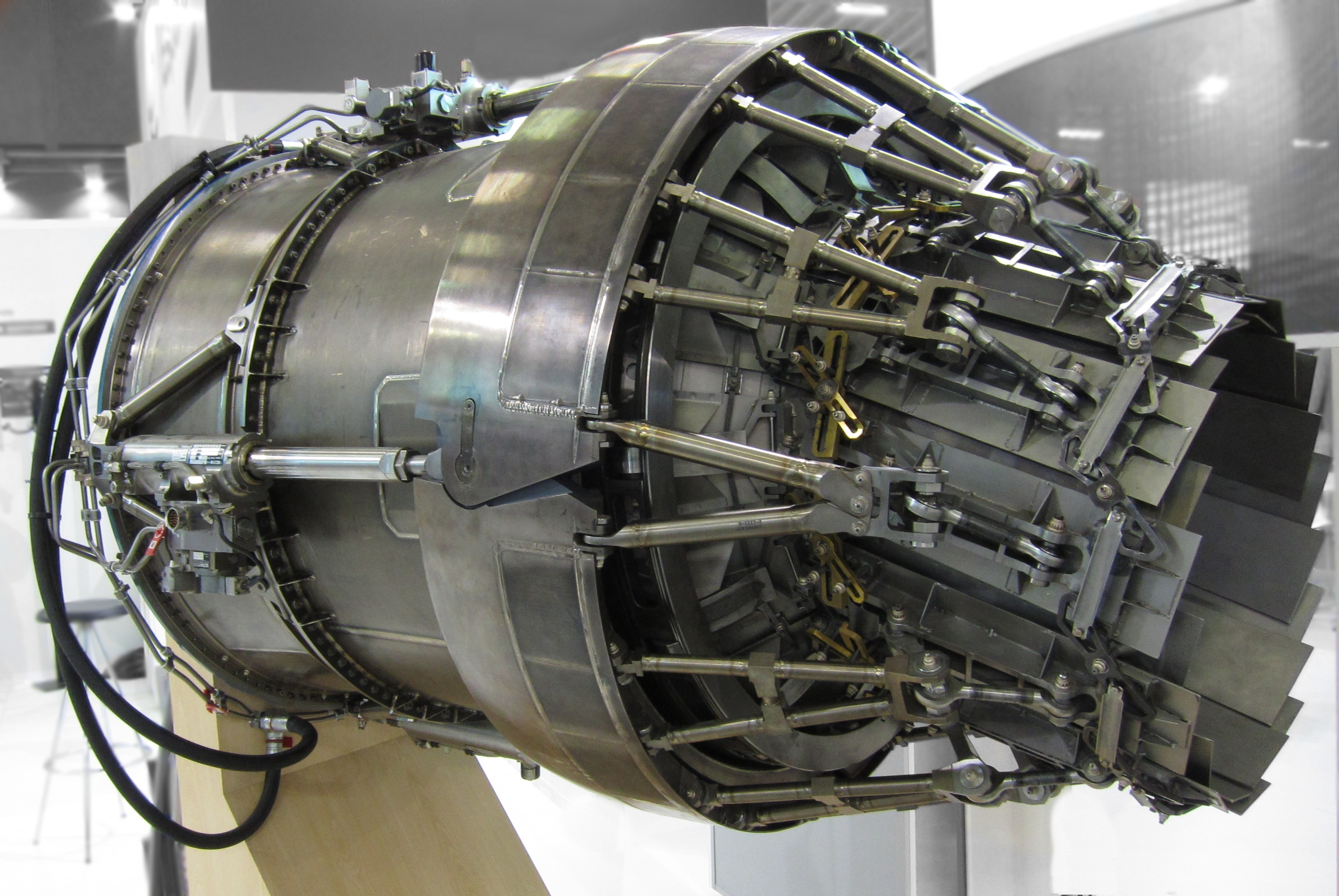
EJ200 TVC prototype

Several improvements to the base model of the engine have been mooted. In addition to the potential for increased thrust output of up to 30%, the EJ200 engine has the potential to be fitted with a thrust vectoring control (TVC) nozzle, which the Eurofighter and Eurojet consortium have been actively developing and testing, primarily for export but also for future upgrades of the fleet. TVC could reduce fuel burn on a typical Typhoon mission by up to 5%, as well as increase available thrust in supercruise by up to 7% and take-off thrust by 2%. Eurojet has sought funding to test TVC nozzles on a flight demonstrator. Clemens Linden, Eurojet TURBO GmbH CEO, stated in 2018 of the consortium's development efforts that "To achieve more thrust we would increase the airflow and pressure ratios of the high and low pressure compressors and run higher temperatures in the turbines by using the latest generation single crystal turbine blade materials. And with higher aerodynamic efficiencies we can achieve a lower fuel burn. A third area of improvement would be the engine exhaust nozzle which would be upgraded with the installation of a 2-parametric version allowing independent and optimized adjustment of the throat and exit area at all flight conditions, providing fuel burn advantages. The technologies for the different components are at a Technology readiness level of between 7 and 9. The nozzle has been at ITP in Spain on a test bed for 400 hours."

== Workshare ==
Table 1 Eurojet GmbH organisation
Partner company	Development share	Production share	Responsibilities
Rolls-Royce	33%	34.5%	Combustion system, high-pressure turbine and engine health monitoring system.
MTU Aero Engines	33%	30%	Low pressure and high-pressure compressors, system design responsibility for the Digital Engine Control and Monitoring Unit
Avio	21%	19.5%	Low-pressure turbine, reheat system, gearbox and air/oil system.
ITP Aero	13%	16%	Exhaust nozzles, jet pipe, exhaust diffuser, by-pass duct and external dressings.
