= MTU Aero Engines =

German aircraft engine manufacturer

MTU Aero Engines AG

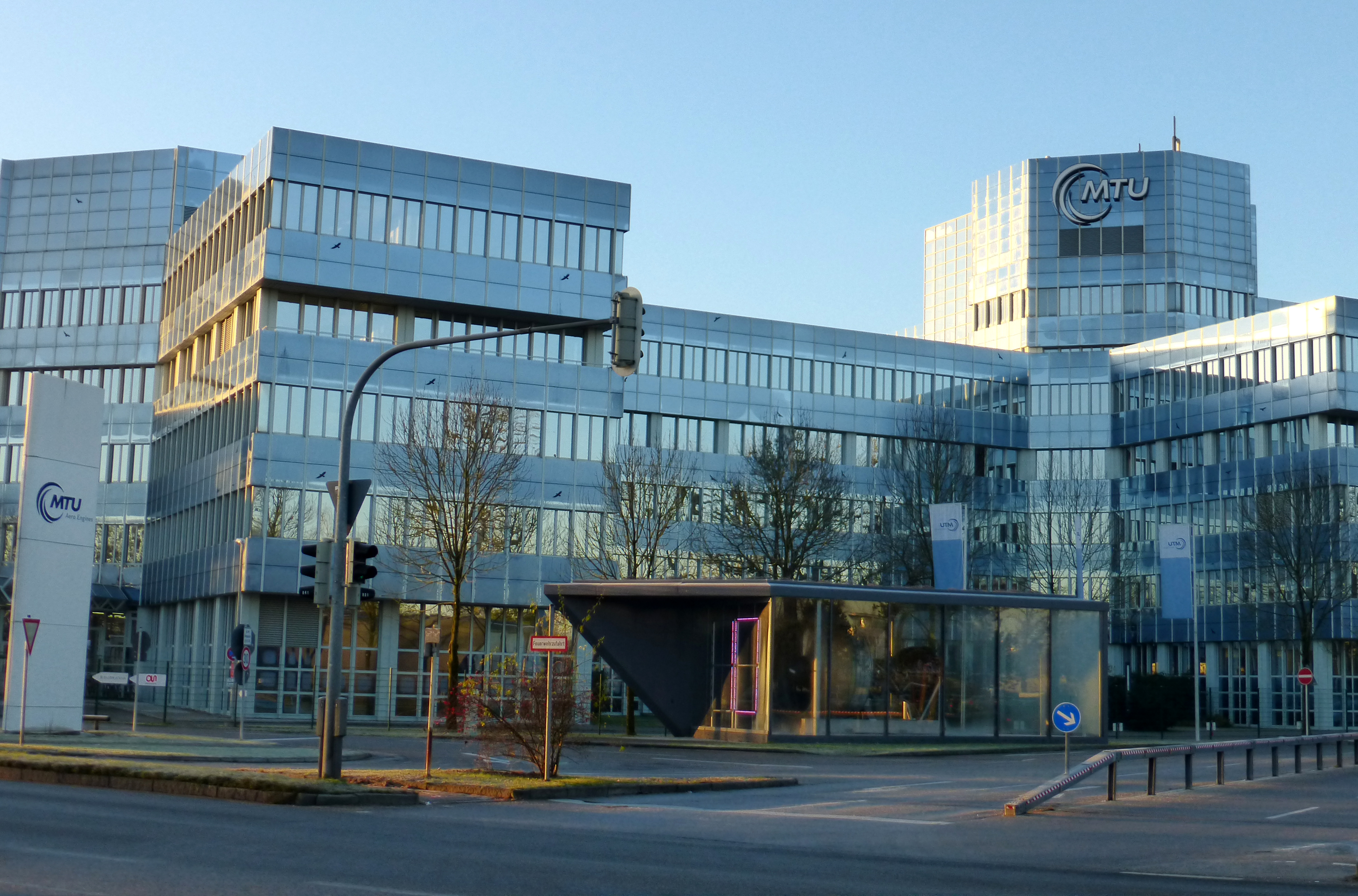
- MTU Aero Engines Headquarters in Munich
- Type: Public (Aktiengesellschaft)
- Traded as: FWB: MTX; DAX component
- Industry: Aerospace, defence
- Predecessor: BMW Flugmotorenbau GmbH
- Founded: 22 December 1934; 91 years ago
- Headquarters: Munich, Germany
- Key people: Johannes Bußmann (CEO); Gordon Riske (Chairman of the supervisory board)
- Products: Production and maintenance of civil and military aircraft engines; industrial gas turbines
- Revenue: ▲€4.628 billion (2019)
- Operating income: ▲€706 million (2019)
- Net income: ▲€488 million (2019)
- Total assets: ▲€7.765 billion (31 December 2019)
- Total equity: ▲€2.421 billion (31 December 2019)
- Number of employees: ▲10,660 (31 December 2019)
- Subsidiaries: Vericor Power Systems
- Website: mtu.de/en

MTU Aero Engines AG is a German aircraft engine manufacturer. MTU develops, manufactures and provides service support for military and civil aircraft engines. MTU Aero Engines was formerly known as MTU München.

== History ==
While the Munich-based engine manufacturer Rapp Motorenwerke, and subsequently BMW, had produced aircraft engines since 1913, the modern company regards the formal date of its formation as being 1934, the year in which BMW Flugmotorenbau GmbH was spun-off from BMW. This step was initiated by the Ministry of Aviation in order to disguise the planned rearmament of the Luftwaffe – as a standalone limited company the Flugmotorenbau GmbH had less strict disclosure requirements. Additionally, BMW aimed at outsourcing the unforeseeable risk of contributing to the German rearmament. In 1936, BMW built an aircraft engine plant in Allach near Munich, which are the headquarters of MTU Aero Engines today. In 1940, the plant was expanded significantly to start large-scale production of BMW 801 aircraft engines, which powered the Focke-Wulf Fw 190 fighter aircraft and Dornier Do 217 bomber aircraft.

Following the conclusion of the conflict in May 1945, American troops occupied the factory grounds in Allach, after which aircraft engine production was halted for ten years. During these years, the factory served as a U.S. Army vehicle and artillery repair shop.

=== 1950s ===
On 22 January 1954, BMW formally re-commenced aircraft engine development. Three years later, after the ban on engine production was lifted in Germany, the company was able to restart aero engine production at Allach, initially focusing upon the licensed production of foreign-sourced, typically American, aero engines. By 1959, BMW Triebwerkbau GmbH was engaged in the production under licence of the General Electric J79-11A turbojet engine for the German Air Force's Lockheed F-104 Starfighter fleet.

=== 1960s ===
In 1960, MAN AG acquired 50 percent of BMW Triebwerkbau GmbH.

During the 1960s, the Rolls-Royce Tyne turboprop engine was also being manufactured via a licensing arrangement, it was used as the powerplant for multiple Luftwaffe aircraft, such as the Breguet Atlantic, a maritime patrol aircraft, and the C-160 Transall, a utility transport aircraft. In addition to licensing other firm's aero engine designs, the company was keen to branch out into the development of new engines via the formation of risk-sharing partnerships with other European manufacturers.

In 1965, MAN AG purchased the remainder of the company, and merged it with MAN Turbomotoren GmbH to form MAN Turbo GmbH. In autumn 1968, MAN Turbo GmbH and Daimler-Benz formed a new joint venture, initially known as Entwicklungsgesellschaft für Turbomotoren GmbH, which combined their aircraft engine development and manufacturing interests. In July 1969, this joint venture was superseded by Motoren- und Turbinen-Union GmbH (MTU), which took over the aircraft engine and high-speed diesel engine activities of both MAN Turbo and Daimler-Benz. MTU München was responsible for aircraft engines, while MTU Friedrichshafen was responsible for diesel engines and other gas turbines.

On 14 October 1969, MTU München formalised its cooperation with both the British aero engine manufacturer Rolls-Royce and the Italian aerospace company FiatAvio through the foundation of Turbo-Union; this entity was established as a joint venture to develop and manufacture the Turbo-Union RB199, a military-grade turbofan engine that was primarily produced to power the Panavia Tornado, a swing-wing multirole combat aircraft adopted by various European nations, including Germany. MTU München held a 40 per cent stake in the ownership of Turbo-Union, while Rolls-Royce held another 40 per cent with the remainder owned by FiatAvio; workshare for the production of the RB199 itself was also divided along a similar ratio.

=== 1980s ===
During 1985, Daimler-Benz acquired MAN's 50% share in the company, after which MTU was placed under its aerospace subsidiary, DASA.

In 1986, EuroJet Turbo GmbH was founded to manage the development, production, support, maintenance, support and sales of the EJ200 turbofan engine for the Eurofighter Typhoon fighter. At the time of its establishment, the original partners in Eurojet GmbH were Rolls-Royce, MTU, Fiat and Sener. The EJ200 engine combined the leading technologies from each of the four European companies, using advanced digital control and health monitoring; wide chord aerofoils and single crystal turbine blades; and a convergent / divergent exhaust nozzle to give excellent thrust-to-weight ratio, multimission capability, supercruise performance, low fuel consumption, low cost of ownership, modular construction and significant growth potential. By late 2006, Eurojet had been contracted to produce a total of 1,400 engines for the Eurofighter.

During June 1989, another joint venture, MTU Turbomeca Rolls-Royce (MTR) was established as a part of the framework created on behalf of the French and West German governments to developed an advanced multirole battlefield helicopter, the Eurocopter Tiger. MTR's role in the programme was to develop and manufacture the MTR390 powerplant that powers the Tiger. While it operates as the programme management company responsible for the engine, it is jointly staffed by the partner companies, these being MTU, France's Turbomeca and Rolls-Royce. The initial workshare was divided as follows: Turbomeca produced the compressor, gearbox, accessories and control system, Rolls-Royce manufactured the power turbine stage, while MTU was responsible for the combustor, high-pressure turbine, along with the final assembly of the entire first batch of engines. During early 2000, an initial production contract was signed by the German Federal Office of Defence Technology and Procurement (BWB) and MTR; valued at DM430 million and comprising 320 engines plus spares, the contract represented the MTU390's clearance for production.

=== 1990s ===
In 1991 MTU Maintenance Berlin-Brandenburg was founded in Ludwigsfelde.

=== 2000s ===
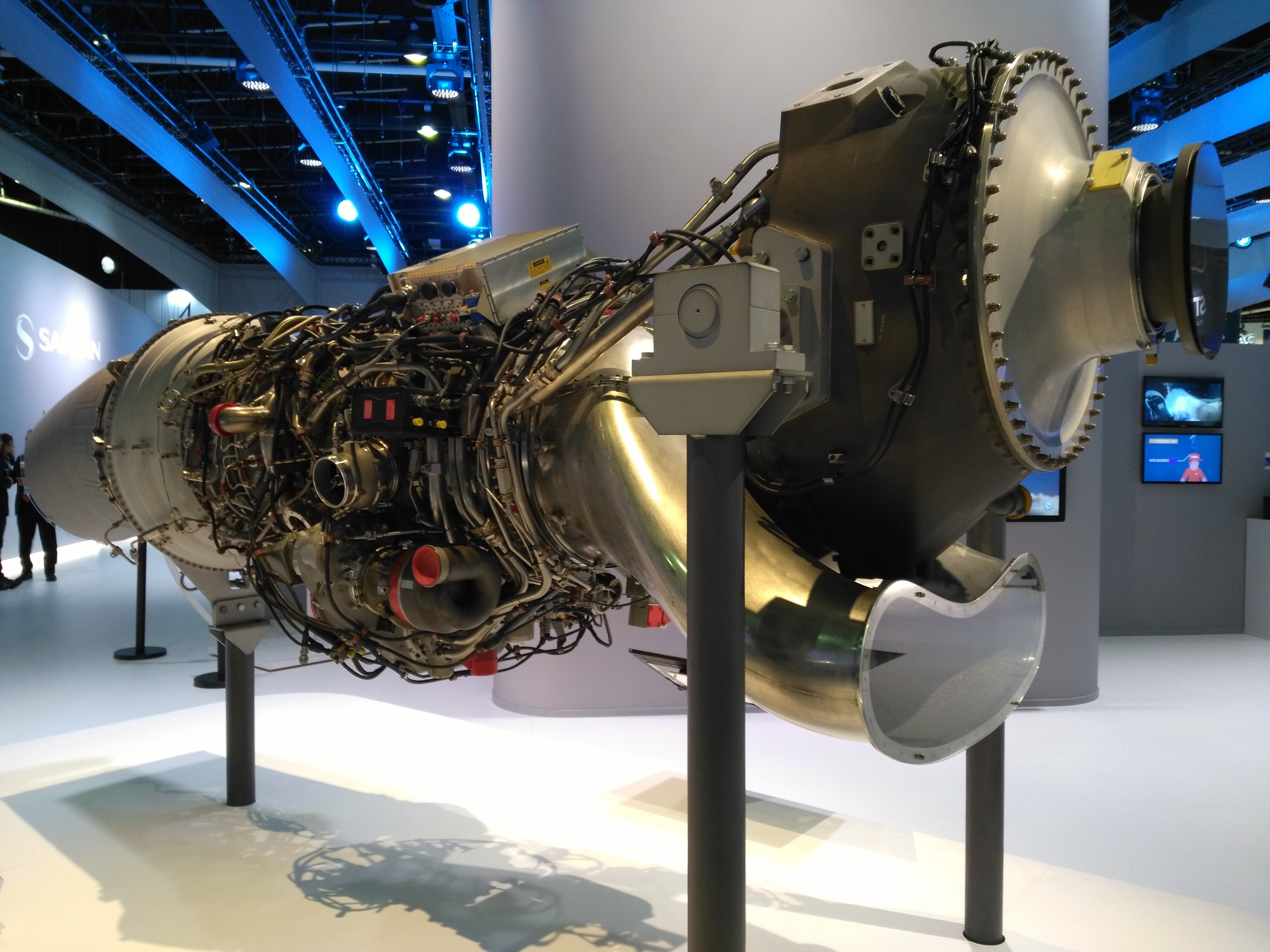
The Europrop TP400 engine on static display at the Paris Air Show, 2017

During 2000, DASA was merged with several other European companies to form the European Aeronautics and Defense Systems (EADS) multinational conglomerate, MTU was split off and remained a part of DaimlerChrysler. Three years later, MTU was sold to the private equity firm KKR. During 2005, KKR opted to sell all of its shares in the firm on the stock exchange.

In 2002, the Europrop International (EPI) consortium was set up by four aero engine manufacturers, MTU, France's Safran Aircraft Engines, Rolls-Royce and Spain's Industria de Turbo Propulsores. EPI GmbH is tasked with designing, developing, marketing, manufacturing and providing support for the TP400-D6 turboprop engine to power the Airbus A400M Atlas, a military airlifter manufactured by Airbus Defence & Space. The TP400 is the most powerful turboprop in the world currently in production.

=== 2010s ===
In 2010, the FAA and EASA grant MTU Maintenance Hannover to conduct MRO on the GE90-110B and -115B engines. For this program, MTU's first customers were Air New Zealand for its fleet of five 777-300ER, V Australia for its five 777-300ER’s, and Southern Air for its two 777 freighters.

In 2019, MTU announced that Serbia would be a centre for aircraft engine repairs, after MTU Aero Engines signed a memorandum of understanding with Serbia's Economy Ministry; a new facility shall be established in the northern town of Stara Pazova, near to Belgrade. The company possesses numerous other locations around the globe, including Rocky Hill, Connecticut; Delta, British Columbia; Rzeszów, Poland; Zhu Hai, China and Fort Worth, Texas.

During December 2019, Safran and MTU announced an agreement to found a 50/50 joint venture to manage the development, production, and after-sales support activities of the new military aero engine intended to power the Future Combat Air System.

=== 2020s ===
In 2021, MTU Maintenance Canada Ltd, MTU's primary MRO facility in North America, moved into a larger 22,000 m^{2} (240,000 sq ft) facility, consolidating work under one roof while also providing additional space for future growth.

== Products ==
=== Civil ===
Model name	Partner/Contract
PW4000	Pratt & Whitney
PW1000G	Pratt & Whitney
PW2000	Pratt & Whitney
PW6000	Pratt & Whitney
PW300	Pratt & Whitney
PW500	Pratt & Whitney
JT8D	Pratt & Whitney
GP7000	Engine Alliance
V2500	International Aero Engines
GEnx	General Electric
GE90	General Electric
GE9x	General Electric
CF6	General Electric
LM 2500	General Electric
LM5000	General Electric
LM6000	General Electric
LMS100	General Electric
CFM56	CFM International

=== Military ===
Model name	Partner/Contract
TP400	as part of the Europrop International consortium
EJ200	as part of the EuroJet Turbo GmbH consortium
MTR390	as part of the MTU Turbomeca Rolls-Royce (MTR) consortium
RB199	as part of the Turbo-Union consortium
F414	General Electric
F110	General Electric
J79	General Electric
GE38	General Electric
T64	General Electric
