= Motoren- und Turbinen-Union =

Motoren- und Turbinen-Union GmbH (MTU) is a former German engine manufacturer, now two separate companies:

- MTU Aero Engines, a German aircraft engine manufacturer
- MTU Friedrichshafen, a former division of DaimlerChrysler
