= MTR MTR390 =

European turboshaft

MTR390
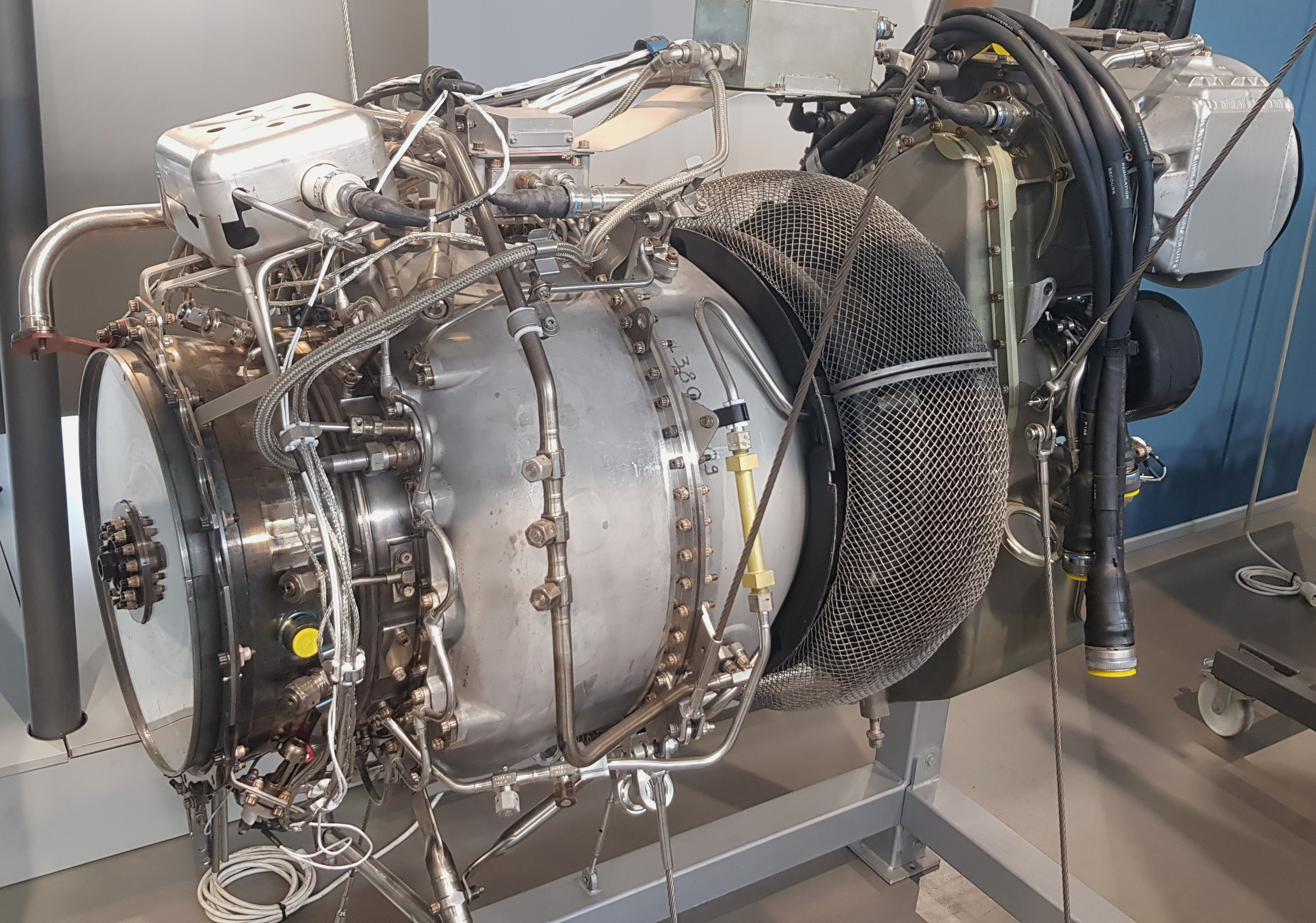
- MTR 390 on display at the MTU Aero Engines museum, Munich
- Type: Turboshaft
- Manufacturer: MTU Turbomeca Rolls-Royce
- First run: December 1989
- Major applications: Eurocopter Tiger

The MTU Turbomeca Rolls-Royce MTR390 is a turboshaft developed for light helicopter applications by MTU Turbomeca Rolls-Royce (MTR). The engine is designed to power helicopters in the weight range of 5-7 tonnes in both single and twin engine configurations. So far the only application is the Eurocopter Tiger. Test runs of the MTR390 began in 1989 and the first test flight was performed in 1991. The MTR390 received military certification in May 1996 and civil approval in June 1997.

An uprated version, the MTR390-E (Enhanced), has been developed with Spain's ITP.

== Variants ==
MTR390-2C
Production engine
MTR390-E
Enhanced variant

== Applications ==
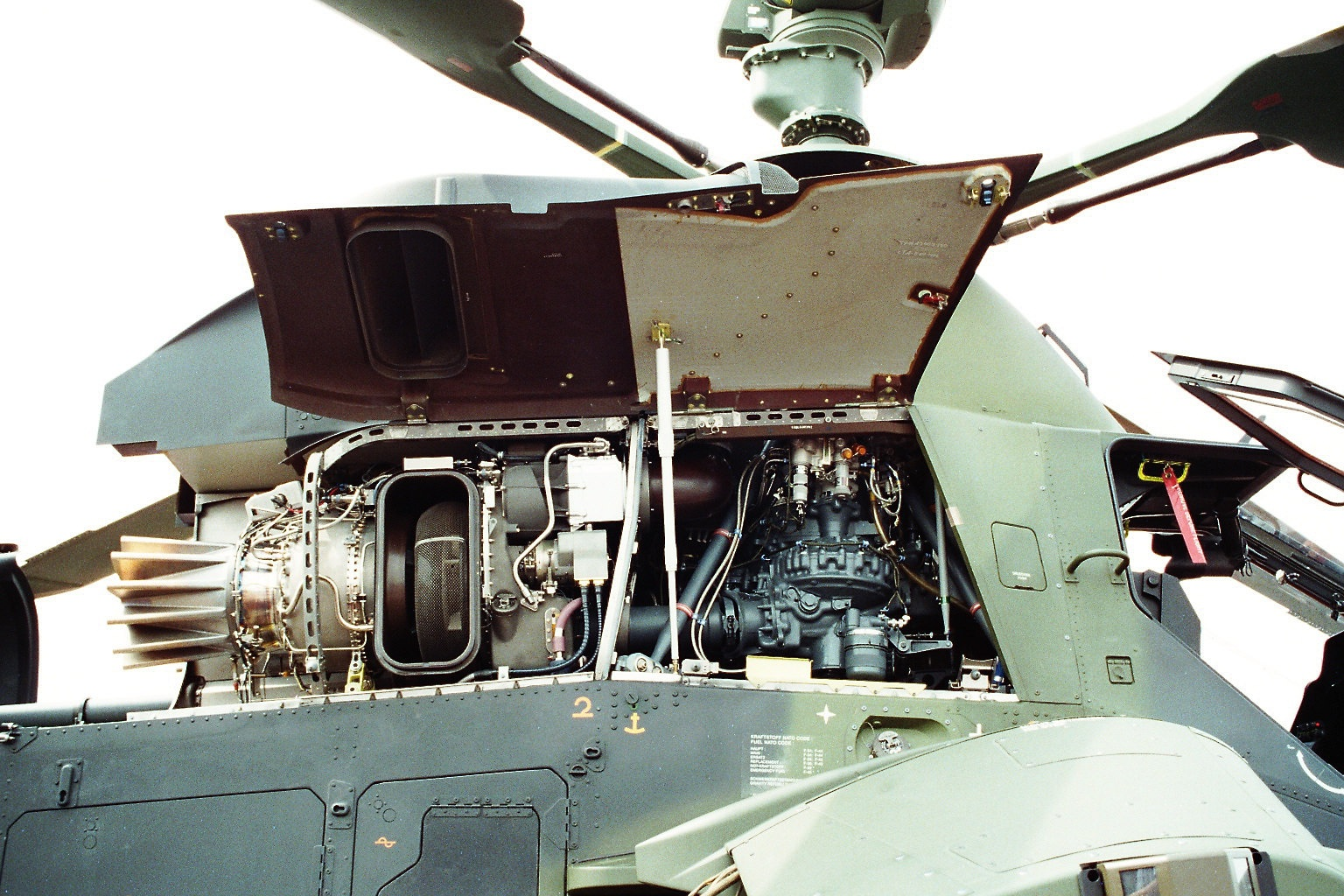
Eurocopter Tiger installation

- Eurocopter Tiger

== Specifications (MTR390-E) ==
Data from MTRI,Aviation Week & Space Technology

==== General characteristics ====
- Type: Centrifugal turboshaft
- Length: 1,078 mm (42.4 in)
- Diameter: 68 cm (26.8 in)
- Dry weight: 179 kg (395 lb)

==== Components ====
- Compressor: Centrifugal, 2 stage
- Combustors: Annular
- Turbine: 1 stage high pressure turbine, 2 stage low pressure turbine

==== Performance ====
- Maximum power output: 1,094 kW (1,467 shp) at take-off
- Overall pressure ratio: 14:1 at take-off
- Specific fuel consumption: 280 g/kW·h (0.46 lb/shp-hr) (MTR390-C2)
- Power-to-weight ratio: 6.11 kW/kg at take-off

== See also ==
Comparable engines

- Avco/Pratt & Whitney T800
- HAL HTSE-1200
- Safran Ardiden
