= Paul Hopkins (pilot) =

Paul Anthony Hopkins (22 March 1951 – 31 August 2014) was a British aviator, and the former Chief Test Pilot of British Aerospace in the 1990s.

== Career ==
He joined the RAF in 1969 and flew the Harrier throughout the 1970s. He left the RAF in 1985. In 1996 he tested the BAE Systems and SAAB joint venture Saab JAS 39 Gripen.

=== British Aerospace ===
On Saturday 28 September 1996 at 3.45pm, Tornado F3 'ZE759' crashed 60 yards off the south beach of Blackpool. Both ejected. and one landed on the beach. Aged 45, he went to Blackpool Victoria Hospital. Alan Reynolds, aged 47, the navigator, was taken by police helicopter to the Preston Royal Infirmary, with an injured back. It took 32 days to find the black box.

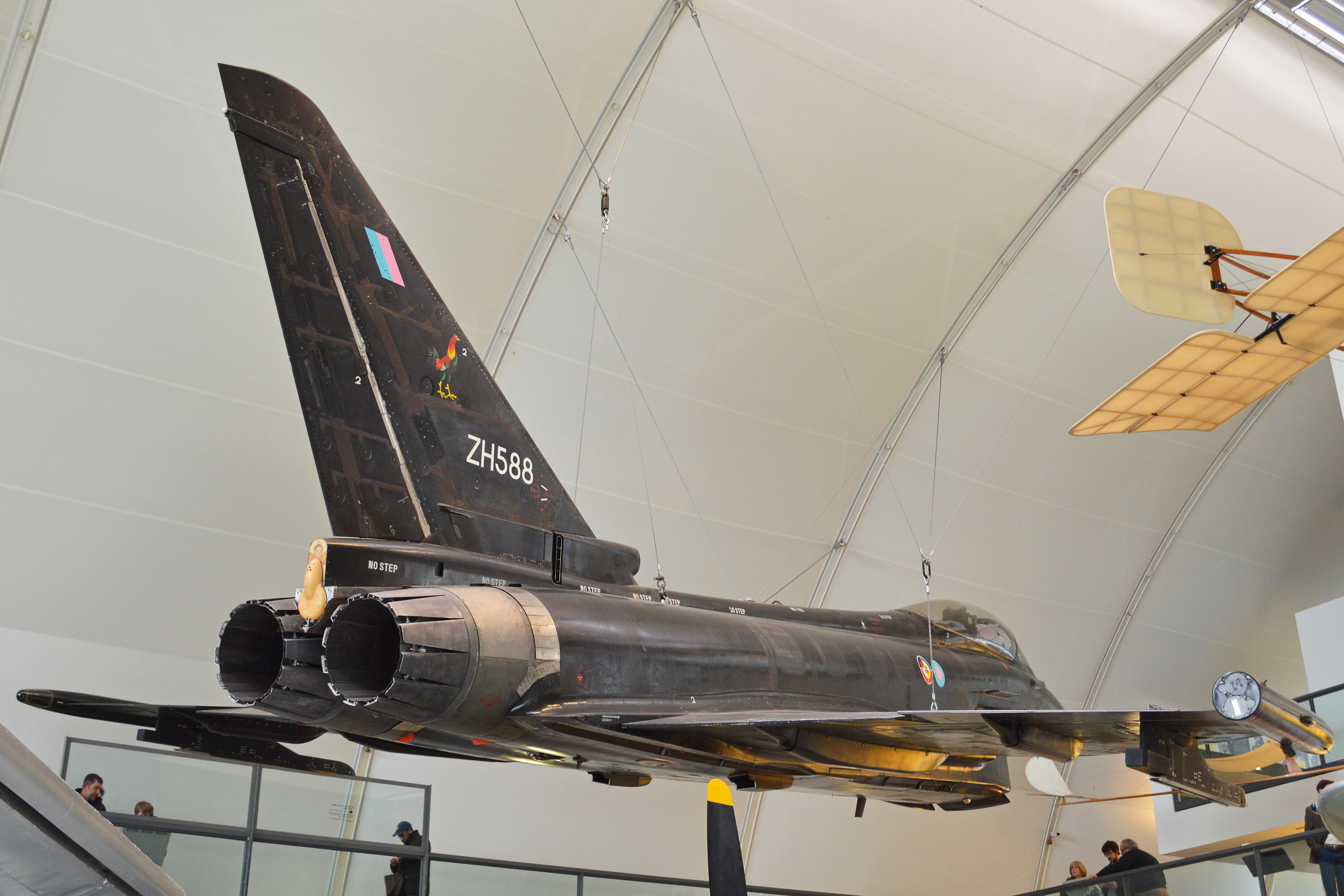
Eurofighter EF2000 ZH588, the first British Eurofighter prototype, seen in March 2015 at the Milestones of Flight gallery at the RAF Museum; its first flight was on 6 April 1994, being at the RAF Museum since January 2008, with a flying time of 614 hours; the Eurofighter (DA1) first flew from Ingolstadt Manching Airport on 27 March 1994 by Peter Weger, the DASA chief test pilot

He became Chief Test Pilot of British Aerospace in 1997. He stopped flying in 2005.

He was the first to go at twice the speed of sound with the Eurofighter 2000 (DA2 or ZH588), when powered by Tornado Turbo-Union RB199 engines in January 1998. In late April 1999, he took Richard Johns, Chief of the Air Staff (United Kingdom) in Eurofighter 'DA4'.

The Eurofighter 2000 was a £40bn project. He was the first to refuel the aircraft, with a VC-10 tanker aircraft over the Irish Sea. During the time, Britain intended to buy 232 Eurofighter aircraft, and for the aircraft to enter service in 2002. The first production Eurofighter flew on Monday April 15 2002, a two-seat version, with Paul Hopkins in the back.

He was Project Pilot from 1985 to 1988 for the British Aerospace Hawk 200. He was the first to fly the Hawk Mk66 on 7 April 1989. He was the first to fly the Hawk 128, a BAE Systems Hawk with much-improved open architecture avionics and mission computers on Wednesday 27 July 2005 in Lancashire; the aircraft has a Rolls-Royce Turbomeca Adour Mk951 engine.

He became Project Director of the Advanced Jet Trainer (Hawk T2).

== Personal life ==
Hopkins married Linda Finneron in July 1994 in Lancashire. He lived in Lytham St Annes. On Monday 7 October 1996 his wife Linda gave birth to twin sons at Blackpool Victoria Hospital, Kit and Sam. His wife was an air traffic controller at Blackpool Airport.

He died on 31 August 2014 of Motor Neuron Disease.

== See also ==
- Timeline of the Eurofighter Typhoon
- Craig Penrice, Eurofighter project pilot from 2002 to 2003, and the first to fire an air-to-air missile (AIM-120 AMRAAM) from a Eurofighter (DA4 or ZH590) at the Deep Sea Range
- John Turner (pilot), Eurofighter project pilot from 1992 to 2000

Business positions
Preceded by	Chief Test Pilot of British Aerospace (BAE Systems from 1999); 1997–2005	Succeeded by Keith Dennison
