= David Eagles =

British former test pilot and former Fleet Air Arm pilot

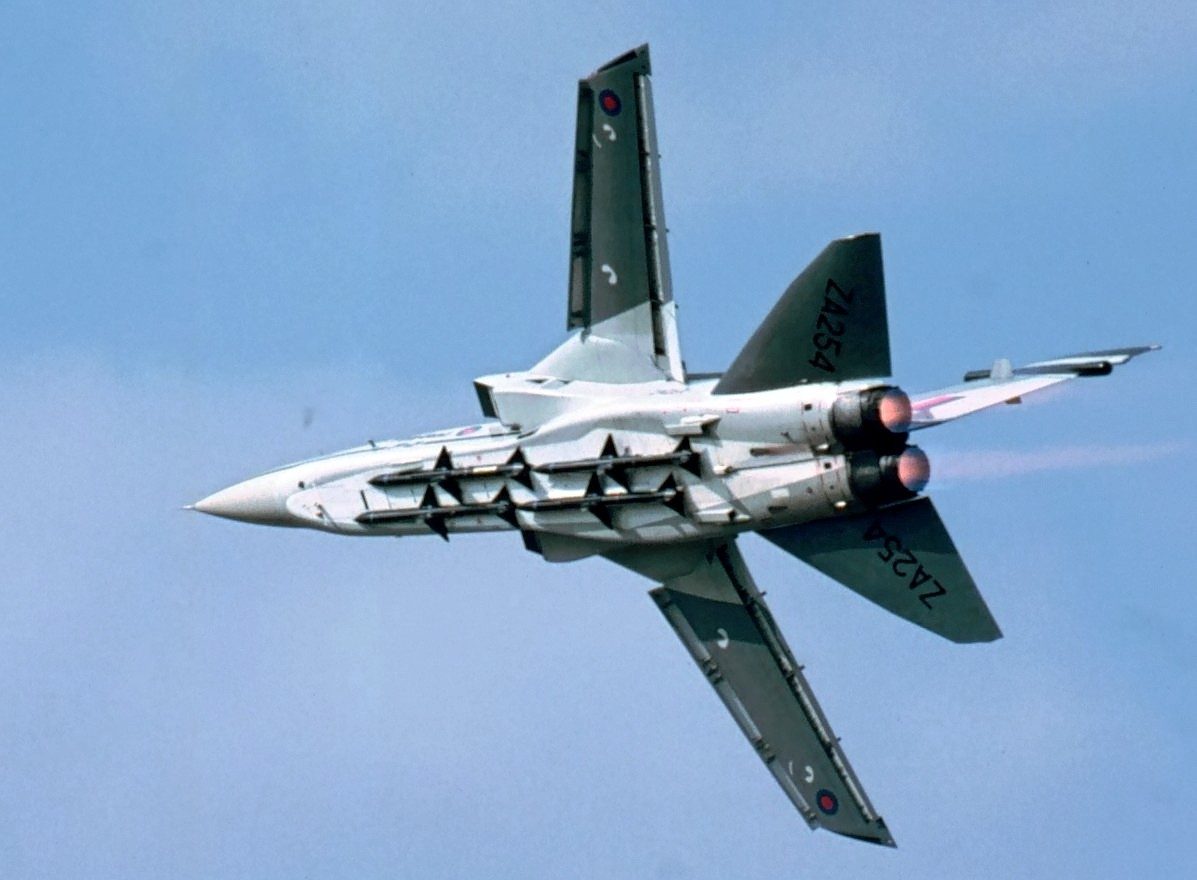
- The first prototype ZA254 of the Tornado F.2, first flown on 27 October 1979
- Born: 1935 (age 90–91); Brighouse, Yorkshire, England
- Known for: Test pilot
- Spouse: Ann Kendal-Ward
- Awards: Air Force Cross; Fellow of the Royal Aeronautical Society; Fellow of the Society of Experimental Test Pilots; Liveryman of the Guild of Air Pilots and Air Navigators
- Aviation career
- First flight: 1953
- Air force: Fleet Air Arm
- Rank: Lieutenant Commander

Lieutenant Commander John David Eagles AFC FRAeS (born 1935) is a British former test pilot and former Fleet Air Arm pilot.

== Early life ==
Dave Eagles was born in Brighouse in the West Riding of Yorkshire in 1935, now in Kirklees. He attended Mirfield Grammar School.

== Career ==
On starting National Service in 1953 he joined the Fleet Air Arm (FAA). For six months he trained on HMS Indefatigable.

He spent fifteen months learning to fly with the United States Navy, where he flew the Harvard (US Navy SNJ), the Grumman F9F Panther and the North American T-28 Trojan at Naval Air Stations Pensacola FLA (Naval Air Station Pensacola) and Kingsville Texas (Naval Air Station Kingsville). He returned to the UK to fly the FAA's Hawker Sea Hawk, one of Britain's first naval jet fighters. Seconded to the Royal Australian Navy (RAN) Fleet Air Arm for two years from June 1956, he flew the Fairey Firefly and Hawker Sea Fury from RANAS Nowra (HMAS Albatross), New South Wales, leaving Australia in March 1958. He flew Sea Venom and Sea Vixen fighters from British carriers until 1963.

=== Test pilot ===
In 1963, he entered the Empire Test Pilots' School at Farnborough and completed the Empire Test Pilots' Course. At MoD Boscombe Down for three years with the Naval Test Squadron, he flight-tested the current Naval aircraft and was project pilot for the Blackburn Buccaneer Mk 2. He ejected from a Buccaneer in 1966 during a catapult launch (CATOBAR) trial on HMS Victorious. Afterwards he returned to the Fleet Air Arm, leading the Buccaneer Aeros five-plane display team.

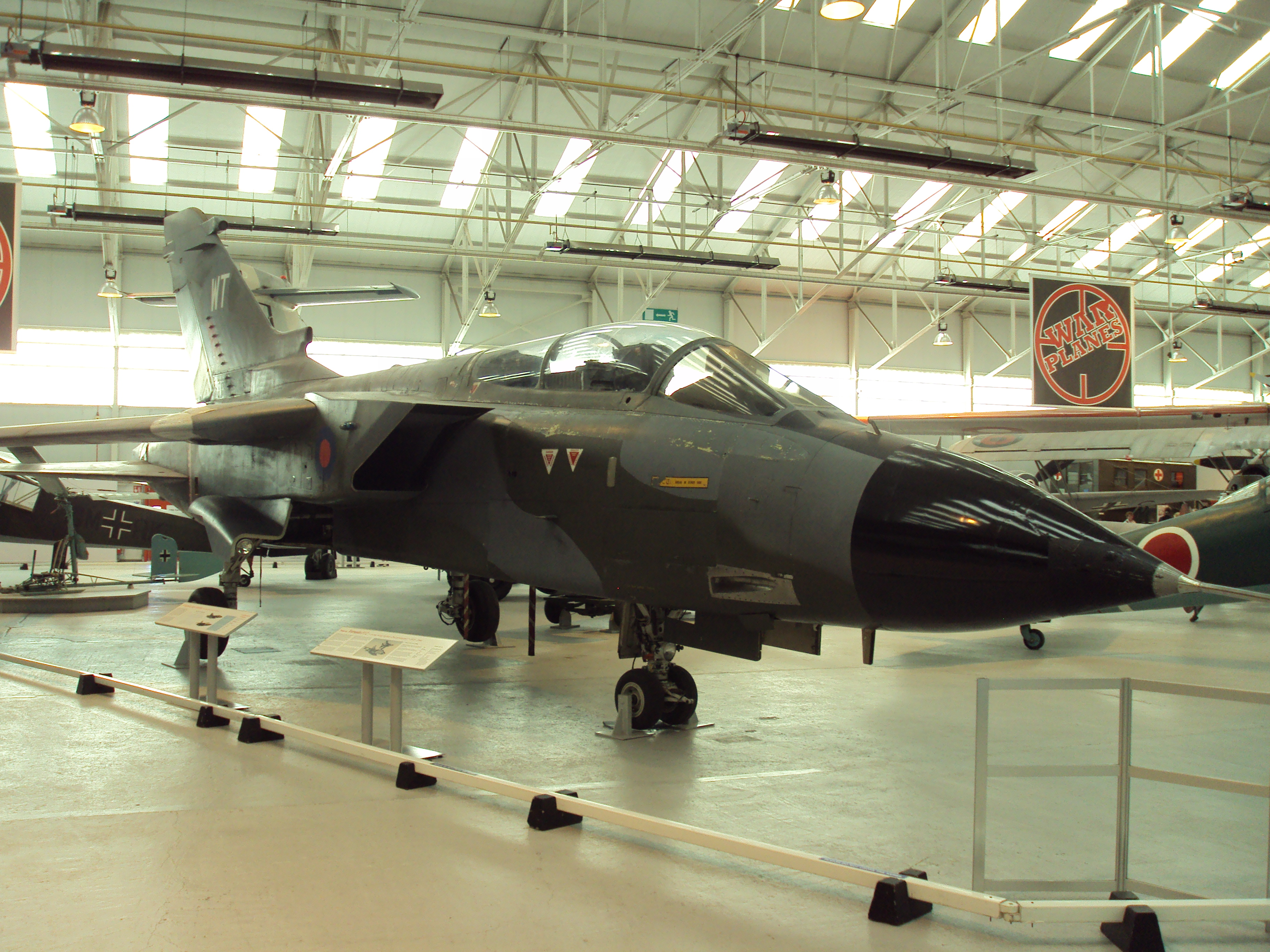
The first British MRCA prototype XX946

=== BAC ===
He joined the British Aircraft Corporation as a test pilot in 1968, where he flight-tested the English Electric Lightning, English Electric Canberra and SEPECAT Jaguar from 1969.

He was the project test pilot when the Panavia Tornado was being developed by BAC from 1972. On 17 October 1974 he carried out the first taxi-run of the first British aircraft (XX946). of which the first flight had been made in Germany on 14 August 1974 from Ingolstadt Manching Airport. He flew the second, 55 min flight, of the first British prototype on 19 November 1974, and the first flight of the second British aircraft (XX947) on 5 August 1975.

=== British Aerospace ===
When British Aerospace was formed in 1977 he was made Chief Test Pilot. In January 1983 he became Director of Flight Operations, succeeding Paul Millett, the first British person to fly the Tornado in 1974 at Manching.

On 27 October 1979 he flew the Tornado F.2 (ZA254), unusually going supersonic on its first flight, with Roy Kenward. Three Tornado F.2 prototypes were built; the others were ZA267 and ZA283. He flew the second prototype ZA 267 on 18 July 1980. Fitted with a more powerful RB199 engine and increased in length by 14 in (356 mm) the F.2 was redesignated F.3 when it entered service.

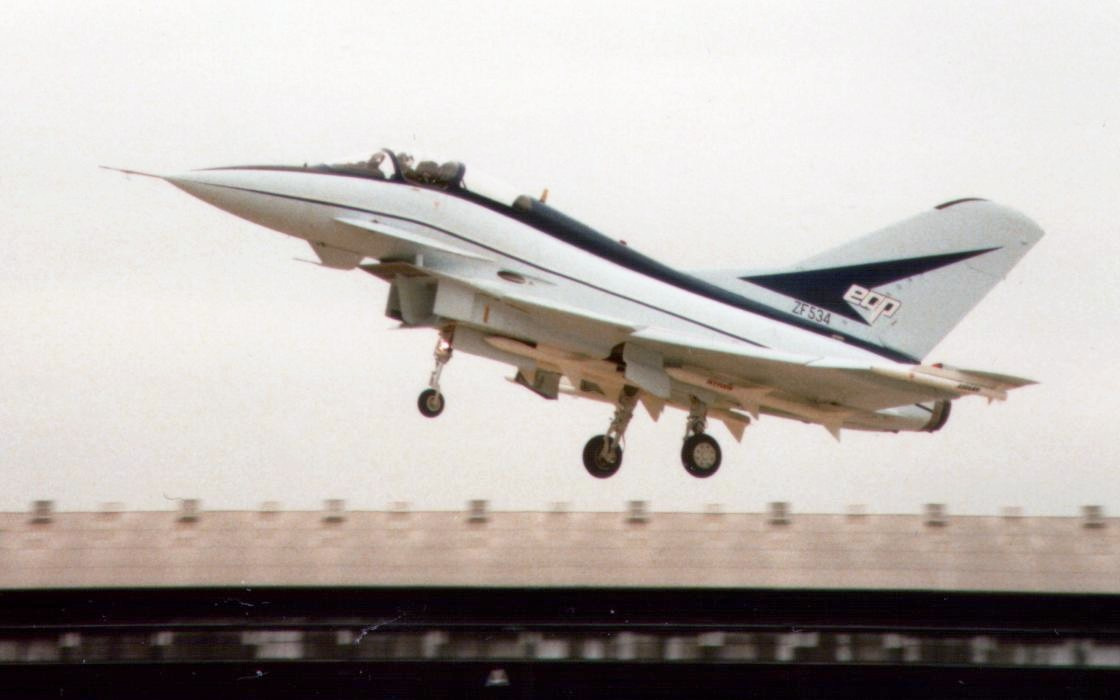
EAP ZF534 at Farnborough in 1986

He piloted the British Aerospace EAP, fore-runner of the Typhoon (ZF534) on its first flight on 8 August 1986, exceeding Mach 1. He said the EAP "is just what a fighter pilot wants. It is a shame we are only building one and not 800." He retired from test flying in 1987, having flown over 6,000 hours. Twenty years later in 2007, the Typhoon entered service with the RAF at RAF Coningsby for Quick Reaction Alert duty. The EAP was similar to the Rockwell-MBB X-31. The EAP had started life as the twin-tail Agile Combat Aircraft (ACA) in the early 1980s.

=== Panavia ===
Having reached the military test pilot age limit of 50, he became Deputy Managing Director of Panavia Aircraft GmbH in 1987. He retired from Panavia in 1993 but later returned to Germany in 1996 for a year to assist the Flight Test Department of DASA (became EADS in 2000) with their Eurofighter programme at Manching.

== Publications ==
- British Aerospace E-A-P: Experimental Aircraft Programme, 8 December 1986, ISBN 094695822X

'TESTING TORNADO' Autobiographical. ISBN 978 0 7509 6841 6

== Personal life ==
He is a Fellow of the Society of Experimental Test Pilots, Fellow of the Royal Aeronautical Society and a Liveryman of the Guild of Air Pilots and Air Navigators. He married Raewyn Leach on 29 August 1962, then divorced in 2004 and married Ann Kendal-Ward in October 2008. He currently lives in West Oxfordshire.

== See also ==
- Timeline of the Eurofighter Typhoon

Business positions
Preceded by	Chief Test Pilot of British Aerospace (at Warton); 1977 – 1986	Succeeded by Mike Snelling
