= Mike Snelling =

British pilot (born 1941)

Michael Henry Bruce Snelling AFC (born 1941) is a former British fighter pilot, test pilot and airline pilot.

== Early life ==
Born in Brighton, Sussex, Mike Snelling was educated at Prestonville School, Brighton and Radley College where he was a classics scholar.

== Career ==
Snelling joined the Royal Air Force (RAF) as a Technical Cadet, as a member of 8(U) entry at the RAF Technical College at RAF Henlow in 1959. He read Engineering at Fitzwilliam College, Cambridge. After post graduate training he was sent for basic flying training. In 1965 he transferred to the RAF General Duties Branch. After advanced flying training he was posted to the Central Flying School and graduated as a flying instructor on the Gnat T Mk 1. After a tour at RAF Valley in Anglesey, he joined No.229 OCU at RAF Chivenor for Hawker Hunter conversion. He then served as a DFGA (Day Fighter/Ground Attack) Hunter pilot on 208 Sqn at RAF Muharraq in Bahrain.

=== Test pilot ===
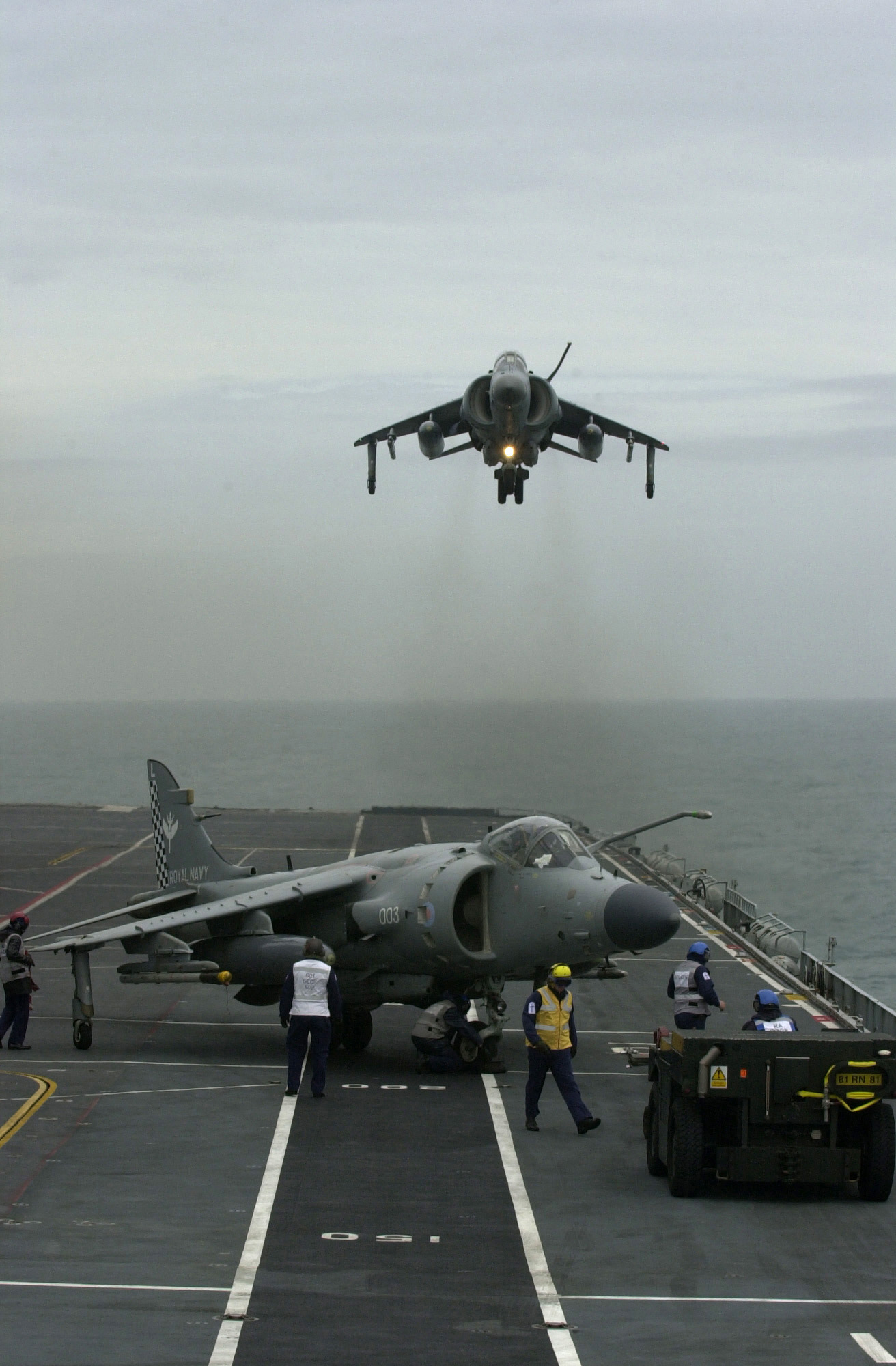
Sea Harrier FA2 of 801 Naval Air Squadron on HMS Illustrious (R06) in June 2001

In 1970 Snelling graduated from the Empire Test Pilots' School 29 (FW) course. He joined A (Fighter Test) Squadron of the Aeroplane and Armament Experimental Establishment at Boscombe Down. He specialised in weapon system testing. In 1972 he was appointed Senior Pilot. In 1973 he was awarded the Air Force Cross.

He left the RAF and started work as a test pilot for Hawker Siddeley in 1973 and joined the Harrier project.

He was the pilot that tested the Harrier and Sea Harrier with the ski-jump take-off method in 1977 and 1978, later adopted by the Fleet Air Arm of the Royal Navy. The testing began on 5 August 1977 with Harrier XV281. In August 1978 he became the second person to fly the Sea Harrier when he took XZ450 for its sixth flight at Dunsfold. The aircraft itself had been first flown on 20 August 1978. On 13 November 1978 he was the first person to land a Sea Harrier at sea in the Moray Firth on HMS Hermes. The ship was anchored whilst the trials took place. In 1980 he was awarded the Queen's Commendation for Valuable Service in the Air.

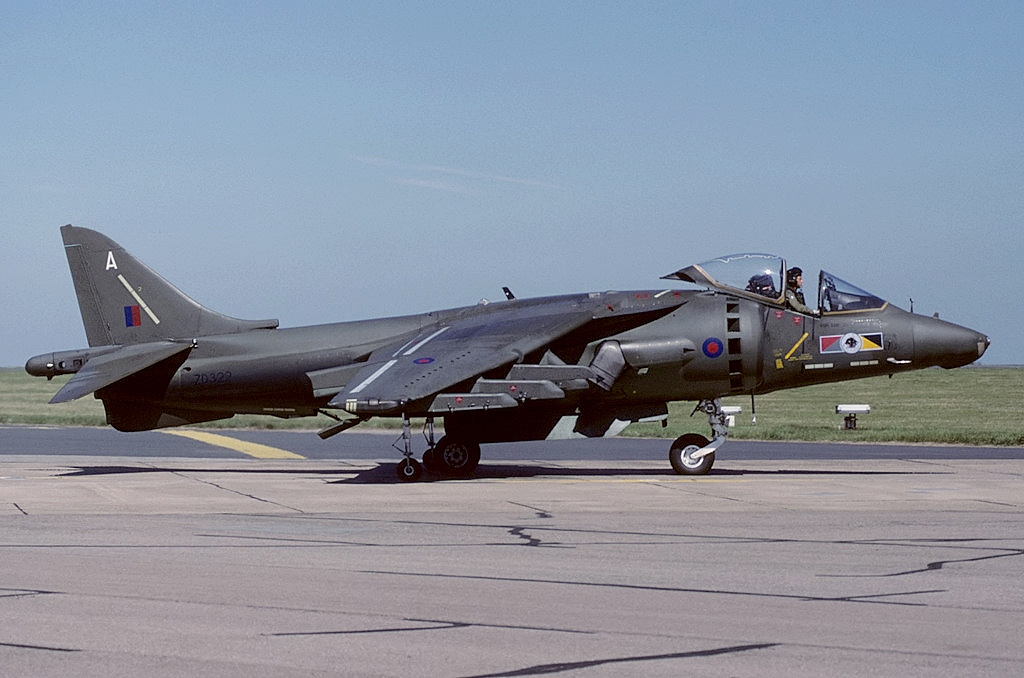
Harrier GR5 ZD322 of No 233 Operational Conversion Unit RAF (RAF Wittering) in July 1989

He was the first person to fly the Harrier GR5 (ZD318) on 30 April 1985 at Dunsfold Aerodrome. The GR5 would enter RAF service in July 1987, and was designated as the British Aerospace Harrier II. It was the version of the Harrier that would remain in service until its retirement in 2010. It had a larger composite wing and flap system giving greater range and payload than the previous Harrier.

On 19 May 1986 he was the first person to fly the single-seat British Aerospace Hawk 200 fighter plane on a flight of 1 hour 20 minutes from Dunsfold. He was a main test pilot on the Sea Harrier.

He retired from test flying in 1989.

=== Commercial Pilot ===
Snelling joined Air Europe in 1990 and flew Boeing 737 aircraft as a captain on European routes. When that airline failed, he joined Sabena as a contract pilot flying DHC-8 aircraft from Brussels Airport and retired from flying in 1994.

== Personal life ==
Snelling married Jennifer Fox in 1965 in the Spen Valley district in the West Riding of Yorkshire (now West Yorkshire); they have two daughters - Astrid and Heidi. He married Mary Yelf in 1981.

In the 1970s and 1980s, he lived at Botterells House, High Street in Billingshurst, in West Sussex.

Business positions
Preceded by David Eagles	Chief Test Pilot of British Aerospace; 1986-89	Succeeded by Heinz Frick
