= Sener Aeronáutica =

- Company type: Subsidiary
- Industry: Aerospace; Energy
- Founded: 1956; 70 years ago
- Headquarters: Getxo
- Parent: SENER

Sener Aeronáutica (Sener Aeroespacia) is the aerospace arm of the Spanish company Grupo SENER. Since its formation in 1956, the group has developed expertise a number of fields including Marine, Power Systems, and Space. The group has links with a number of Spanish universities.

With Rolls-Royce Sener Aeronáutica has a major shareholding in Industria de Turbo Propulsores (ITP). ITP worked to develop the Europrop TP400 engine for the Airbus A400M military transport. It is also involved in the Eurojet EJ200 military turbofan which powers the Eurofighter Typhoon fighter.

Sener is also involved in the engineering of major solar power projects within Spain, such as the Andasol Solar Power Station and the Gemasolar Thermosolar Plant.
