= MTU Turbomeca Rolls-Royce =

Multinational engine manufacturer

- Company type: Joint venture
- Industry: Aeronautics
- Founded: June 1989; 36 years ago
- Headquarters: Hallbergmoos (Upper Bavaria), Germany
- Area served: Worldwide
- Products: Aircraft engines
- Owners: MTU Aero Engines; Safran Turbomeca; Rolls-Royce Holdings
- Website: www.mtr390.com

MTU Turbomeca Rolls-Royce GmbH (MTR) is a multinational engine manufacturer established to develop, manufacture, and service the MTR390 turboshaft engine. It is a joint venture by three European aero-engine manufacturers, Germany's MTU Aero Engines, France's Turbomeca and Britain's Rolls-Royce.

To date, the company's only product has been the MTR390, which was specifically developed for helicopter applications. It powers the Eurocopter Tiger attack helicopter.

== History ==
MTU Turbomeca Rolls-Royce (MTR) was established in June 1989 as a part of the framework created on behalf of the French and West German governments to developed an advanced multirole battlefield helicopter, the Eurocopter Tiger. While a joint venture between the French aerospace firm Aérospatiale and German company Messerschmitt-Bölkow-Blohm (MBB) was chosen as the principal contractors to develop the rotorcraft itself, a separate entity was established to develop the MTR390 powerplant to power it. Specifically, MTR was designated as the programme management company responsible for the engine, and was jointly staffed by the partner companies, Germany's MTU Aero Engines, France's Turbomeca and Britain's Rolls-Royce.

Operationally, MTR manages the direction and coordination of all development, production and support activities associated with the MTR390 engine; it is also responsible for marketing and sales of the engine for other military and civil applications. The company is recognised as the responsible contractual party accountable to the government agencies of the customer nations. Work is divided into functional groups formed by members of each partner company. The engine is constructed from modules that are separately manufactured at the facilities of the MTR partner companies. The initial workshare was as follows: Turbomeca produced the compressor, gearbox, accessories and control system, Rolls-Royce manufactured the power turbine stage, while MTU was responsible for the combustor, high-pressure turbine, along with the final assembly of the entire first batch of engines.

During 1997, the engine programme advanced to the production investment phase; that same year, it was granted civil registration, while military qualification would follow during 1999. On 18 June 1999, Germany and France publicly placed orders for an initial batch of 160 Tiger helicopters, 80 for each nation, valued at €3.3 billion. Accordingly, during early 2000, an initial production contract was signed by the German Federal Office of Defence Technology and Procurement (BWB) and MTR; valued at DM430 million and comprising 320 engines plus spares, the contract represented the MTU390's clearance for production. On 22 March 2002, the first production Tiger was rolled out in a large ceremony held at Eurocopter's Donauwörth factory; although production models began initial acceptance trials in 2003, the first official delivery to the French Army took place on 18 March 2005; the first official Tiger delivery to Germany followed on 6 April 2005.

The MTU390 itself is a FADEC-controlled turboshaft engine; each Tiger helicopter is powered by a pair of these engines. At one point, it was projected that roughly 1,000 engines would be produced in-line with a production run of 427 Tigers. Later-built models of the Tiger are furnished with more powerful models of the MTU390 engine than had been installed upon the initial examples.
