= Eurofighter GmbH =

Anglo-German-Italo-Spanish aerospace and defence manufacturer

Eurofighter Jagdflugzeug GmbH

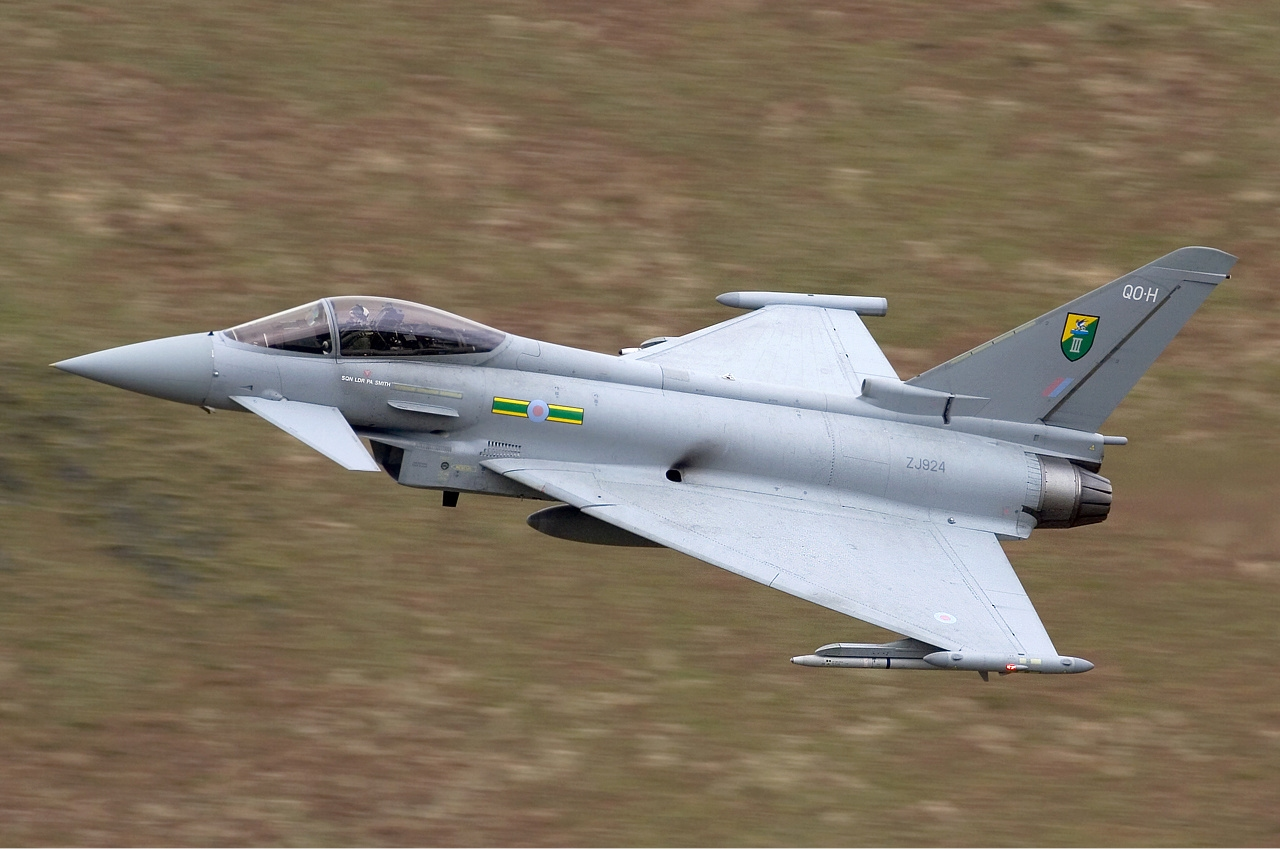
- Eurofighter Typhoon, the primary product of the company
- Type: Joint venture
- Industry: Aerospace
- Founded: 1986; 40 years ago
- Headquarters: Hallbergmoos, Germany
- Area served: Worldwide
- Key people: Jorge Tamarit Degenhardt – Chief Executive Officer
- Products: Eurofighter Typhoon
- Owner: Airbus (46%); BAE Systems (33%); Leonardo (21%)
- Number of employees: 416 (2020)
- Website: eurofighter.com

Eurofighter Jagdflugzeug GmbH (English: Eurofighter Fighter Aircraft GmbH) is a German-headquartered multinational company and joint venture that coordinates the design, production and upgrade of the Eurofighter Typhoon military jet.

Founded in 1986, it has its head office in Hallbergmoos, Germany. The company is owned by the major aerospace companies of the four Eurofighter partner nations:

- 46%: Airbus Defence and Space (then known as EADS) (France, Germany and Spain)
- 33%: BAE Systems Military Air & Information (United Kingdom)
- 21%: Leonardo (Italy)

The Typhoon's engine is designed and manufactured by EuroJet Turbo GmbH, another consortium of European companies.

Eurofighter's customer is the NATO Eurofighter and Tornado Management Agency (NETMA), operating on behalf of the partner nations. The production and management model closely follows that of the earlier Tornado fighter jet programme. In that case, the Panavia Aircraft partnership was responsible for delivering the aircraft, and the Turbo-Union consortium was responsible for the propulsion system.

== History ==
The first production contract was signed on 30 January 1998 between Eurofighter GmbH, Eurojet and NETMA. The procurement totals were as follows: the UK 232, Germany 180, Italy 121, and Spain 87. Production was again allotted according to procurement: BAe (37.42%), DASA (29.03%), Aeritalia (19.52%), and CASA (14.03%). However, during 1995, concerns over workshare, which was based on the number of units intended to be ordered by each contributing nation, were voiced, as all nations involved had opted to reduce their orders following the end of the Cold War and the enactment of the Peace Dividend. The UK cut its orders from 250 to 232, Germany from 250 to 140, Italy from 165 to 121 and Spain from 100 to 87. According to these order levels the workshare split should have been 39/24/22/15 UK/Germany/Italy/Spain, however Germany was unwilling to give up such a large amount of work. In January 1996, after much negotiation between German and UK partners, a compromise was reached whereby Germany would purchase another 40 aircraft. The workshare split was 43% for EADS MAS in Germany and Spain; 37.5% BAE Systems in the UK; and 19.5% for Alenia in Italy.

The maiden flight of the Eurofighter prototype took place in Bavaria on 27 March 1994, flown by DASA chief test pilot Peter Weger. On 9 December 2004, Eurofighter Typhoon IPA4 began three months of Cold Environmental Trials (CET) at the Vidsel Air Base in Sweden, the purpose of which was to verify the operational behaviour of the aircraft and its systems in temperatures between −25 and 31 °C. The maiden flight of Instrumented Production Aircraft 7 (IPA7), the first fully equipped Tranche 2 aircraft, took place from EADS' Manching airfield on 16 January 2008.

In September 1998, contracts were signed for production of 148 Tranche 1 aircraft and procurement of long lead-time items for Tranche 2 aircraft. In March 2008, the final aircraft out of Tranche 1 was delivered to the German Air Force, with all successive deliveries being at the Tranche 2 standard. On 21 October 2008, the first two of 91 Tranche 2 aircraft, ordered four years before, were delivered to RAF Coningsby.

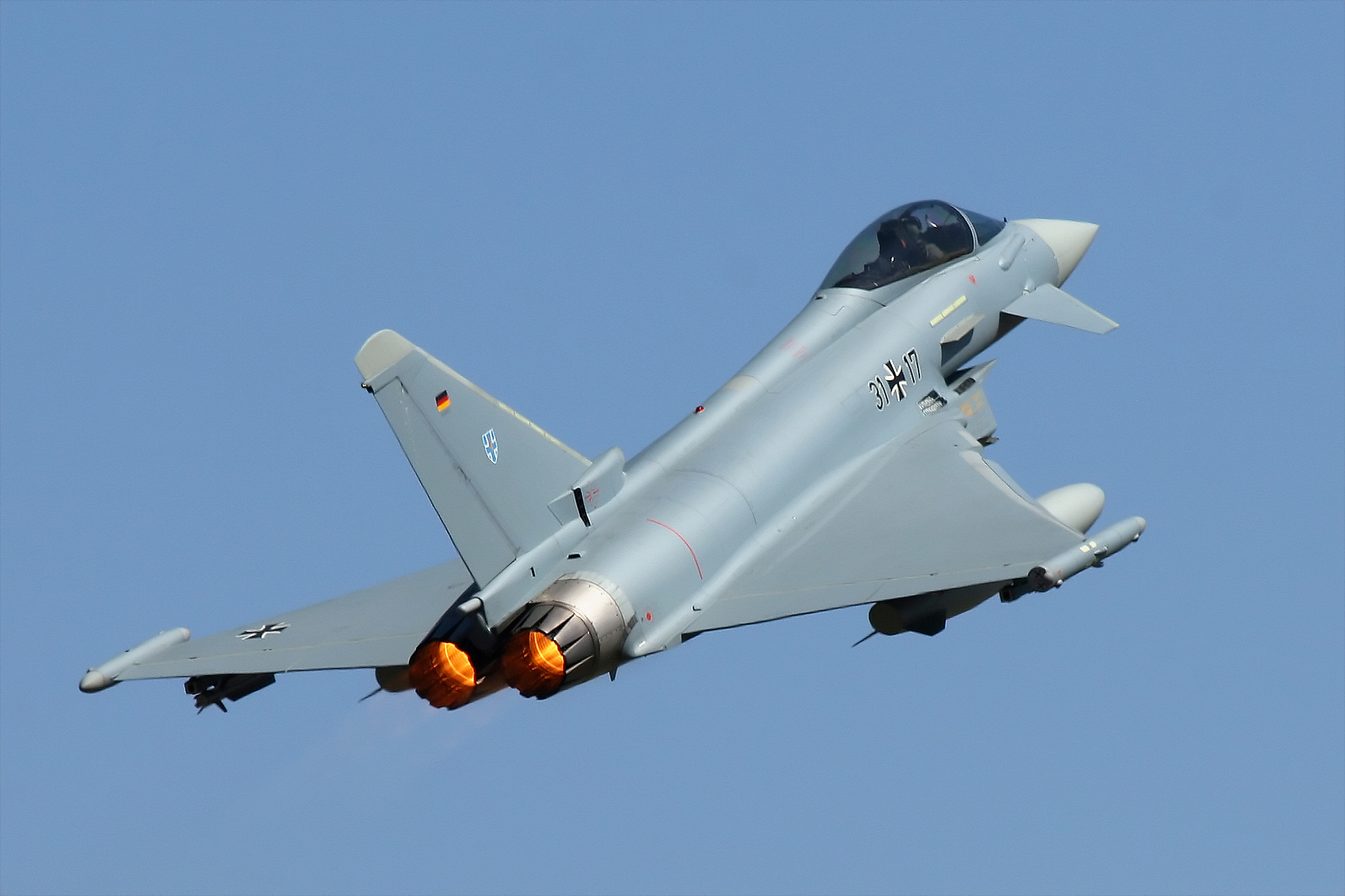
German Air Force Eurofighter Typhoon 31+17 during takeoff, July 2010

In October 2008, the Eurofighter nations were considering splitting the 236-fighter Tranche 3 into two parts. In June 2009, RAF Air Chief Marshal Sir Glenn Torpy suggested that the RAF fleet could be 123 jets, instead of the 232 previously planned. In spite of this reduced requirement, on 14 May 2009 British Prime Minister Gordon Brown confirmed the UK would move ahead with the third batch purchase. A contract for the first part, Tranche 3A, was signed during July 2009 for 112 aircraft split across the four partner nations, including 40 aircraft for the UK, 31 for Germany, 21 for Italy and 20 for Spain. These 40 aircraft were said to have fully covered the UK's obligations in the project due to cost overruns. In February 2019, Germany ordered 33 further Typhoons to replace ageing Tranche 1 aircraft.

The Eurofighter Typhoon is unique in modern combat aircraft in that there are four separate assembly lines. Each partner company assembles its own national aircraft, but builds the same parts for all aircraft (including exports); Premium AEROTEC (main centre fuselage), EADS CASA (right wing, leading edge slats), BAE Systems (front fuselage (including foreplanes), canopy, dorsal spine, tail fin, inboard flaperons, rear fuselage section) and Leonardo (left wing, outboard flaperons, rear fuselage sections).

Production is divided into three tranches (see table below). Tranches are a production/funding distinction, and do not imply an incremental increase in capability with each tranche. Tranche 3 are based on late Tranche 2 aircraft with improvements added. Tranche 3 was split into A and B parts. Tranches were further divided up into production standard/capability blocks and funding/procurement batches, though these did not coincide, and are not the same thing; e.g., the Eurofighter designated FGR4 by the RAF is a Tranche 1, block 5. Batch 1 covered block 1, but batch 2 covered blocks 2, 2B and 5. On 25 May 2011 the 100th production aircraft, ZK315, rolled off the production line at BAE Systems' site at Warton.

Expected production summary
Tranche	Austria	Germany	Italy	Kuwait	Oman	Saudi Arabia	Spain	UK	Qatar	Total
Tranche 1	15 (Note: The change in Austria's order from six Tranche 1 and 12 Tranche 2 aircraft to 15 Tranche 1 jets led to a reduction in Tranche 1 quantities for the four partner nations, with a commensurate increase in Tranche 2 numbers.)	33	28	–	–	–	19	53	–	148
Tranche 2	–	79	47	–	–	48	34	67 (Note: 24 Saudi aircraft were taken from UK Tranche 2 production, and were to have been replaced at the end of Tranche 2, but will now be accounted against the UK's Tranche 3A total. This marks an effective reduction of 24 aircraft in the UK order total.)	–	275
Tranche 3A	–	31	21	28	12	24	20	40	24	200
Total	15	143	96	28	12	72	73	160	24	623

== See also ==
- Edgewing
