= Hallbergmoos =

- Municipality
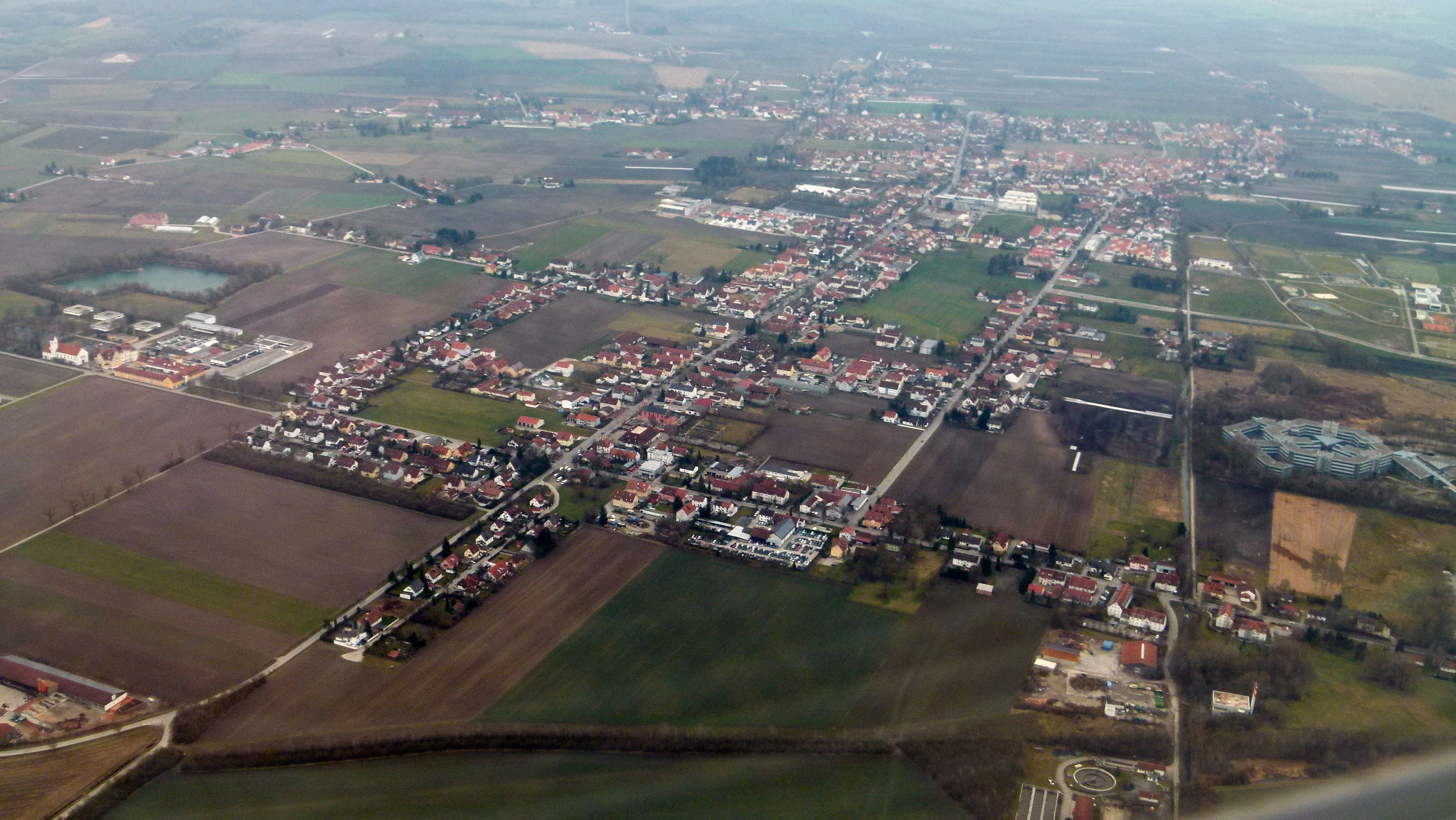
- Aerial view

- Coat of arms

- Location of Hallbergmoos within Freising district
- Interactive map of Hallbergmoos
- Location within Germany Location within Bavaria
- Coordinates: 48°20′N 11°45′E
- Country: Germany
- State: Bavaria
- Admin. region: Oberbayern
- District: Freising

Government
  - Mayor (2021–27): Josef Niedermair (CSU)

Area
  - Total: 35.09 km^{2} (13.55 sq mi)
- Elevation: 460 m (1,510 ft)

Population (2025-12-31)
  - Total: 11,602
  - Density: 330.6/km^{2} (856.3/sq mi)
- Time zone: UTC+01:00 (CET)
  - Summer (DST): UTC+02:00 (CEST)
- Postal codes: 85396–85399
- Dialling codes: 0811
- Vehicle registration: FS
- Website: hallbergmoos.de

Hallbergmoos (German pronunciation: [ˈhalbɛʁkˌmoːs]) is a municipality in the district of Freising in Bavaria in Germany. The Isar River flows west of the town. The municipality is directly south-west of Munich Airport

== Economy ==
Augsburg Airways, a regional airline, was headquartered in Hallbergmoos until it ceased to exist in 2013. The headquarters of the Eurofighter GmbH, which co-ordinates the design, production and upgrade of the Eurofighter Typhoon, is located here.

When it existed, DBA (Deutsche BA) had its head office on the grounds of Munich International Airport and in Hallbergmoos.

Historical population

Year	Pop.	±%
1840	307	—
1871	706	+130.0%
1900	1,141	+61.6%
1925	1,568	+37.4%
1939	1,888	+20.4%
1950	2,596	+37.5%
1960	2,771	+6.7%
1961	2,432	−12.2%
1970	2,813	+15.7%
1980	3,534	+25.6%
1987	4,003	+13.3%
1990	4,822	+20.5%

Year	Pop.	±%
1995	6,141	+27.4%
2005	8,409	+36.9%
2006	8,641	+2.8%
2007	8,850	+2.4%
2008	9,047	+2.2%
2009	9,042	−0.1%
2010	9,266	+2.5%
2011	9,403	+1.5%
2012	9,765	+3.8%
2013	10,084	+3.3%
2014	10,364	+2.8%
2015	10,524	+1.5%

== Education ==
Hallbergmoos has a Grund- und Hauptschule, a combined general primary and secondary general school. The Volkshochschule Hallbergmoos provides adult education services.

The Hallbergmoos Library was established in 1985.

== Recreation ==
The Jugendzentrum Hallbergmoos provides recreational services for youth.
