= Eurojet EJ200 =

Military low bypass turbofan

EJ200
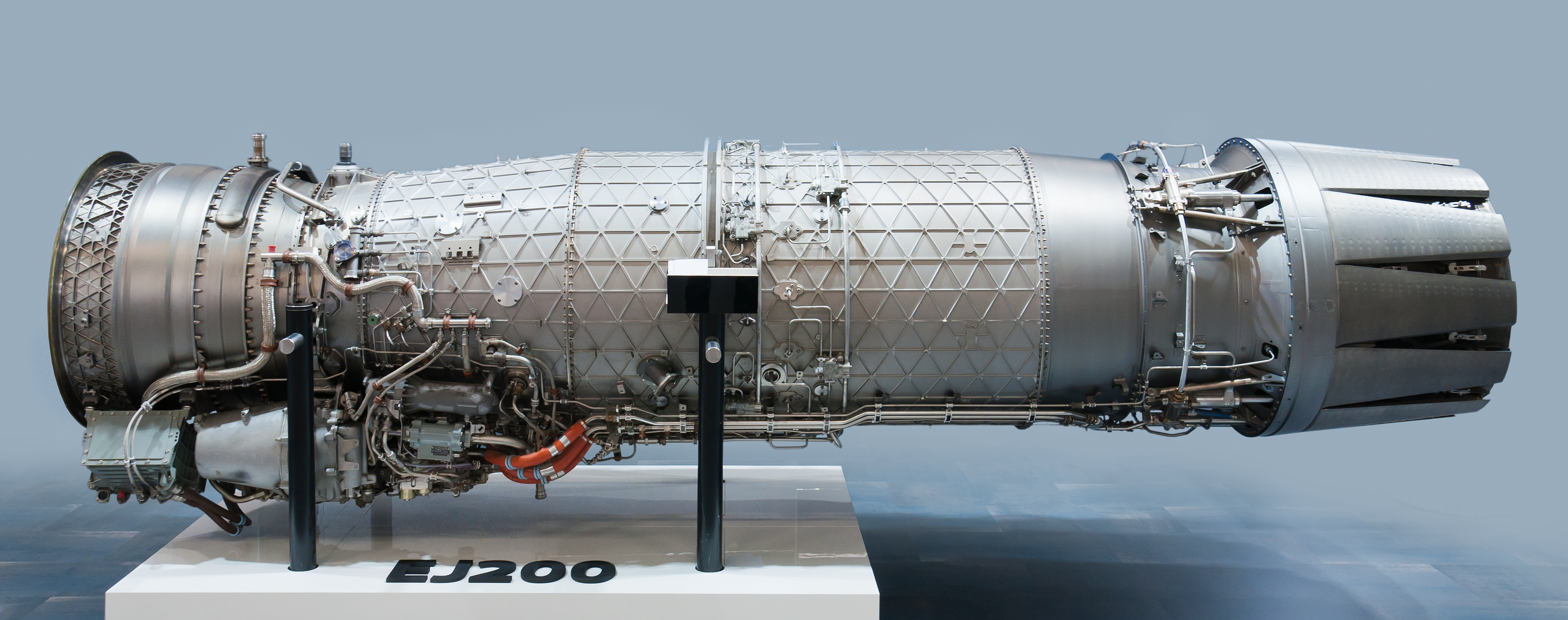
- EJ200 on static display
- Type: Turbofan
- National origin: Multinational
- Manufacturer: EuroJet Turbo GmbH
- First run: 1991
- Major applications: Eurofighter Typhoon
- Number built: Over 1,400 as of the end of 2024; 1.5 million flying hours

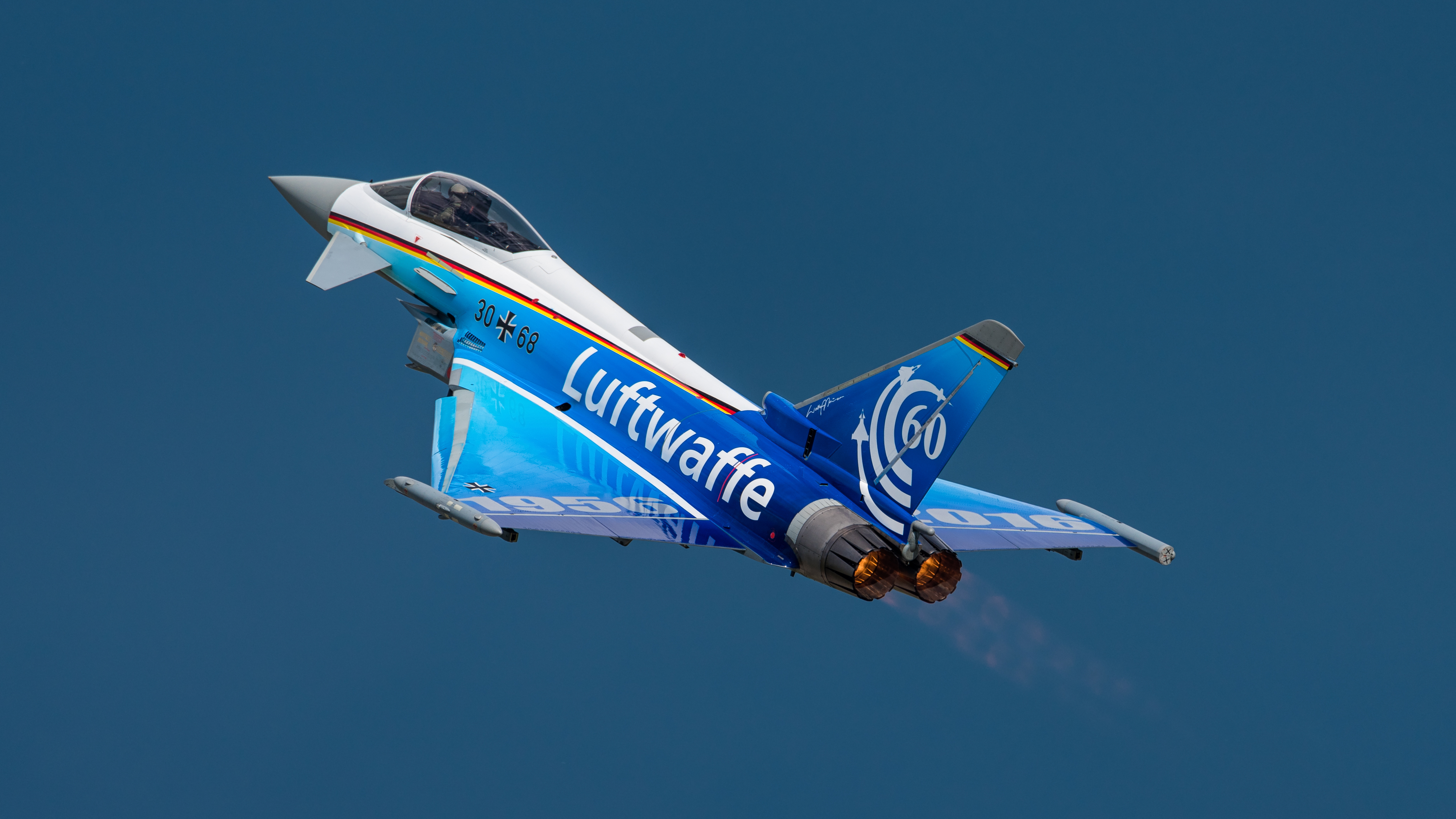
Eurofighter EF2000 with both EJ200s in full reheat

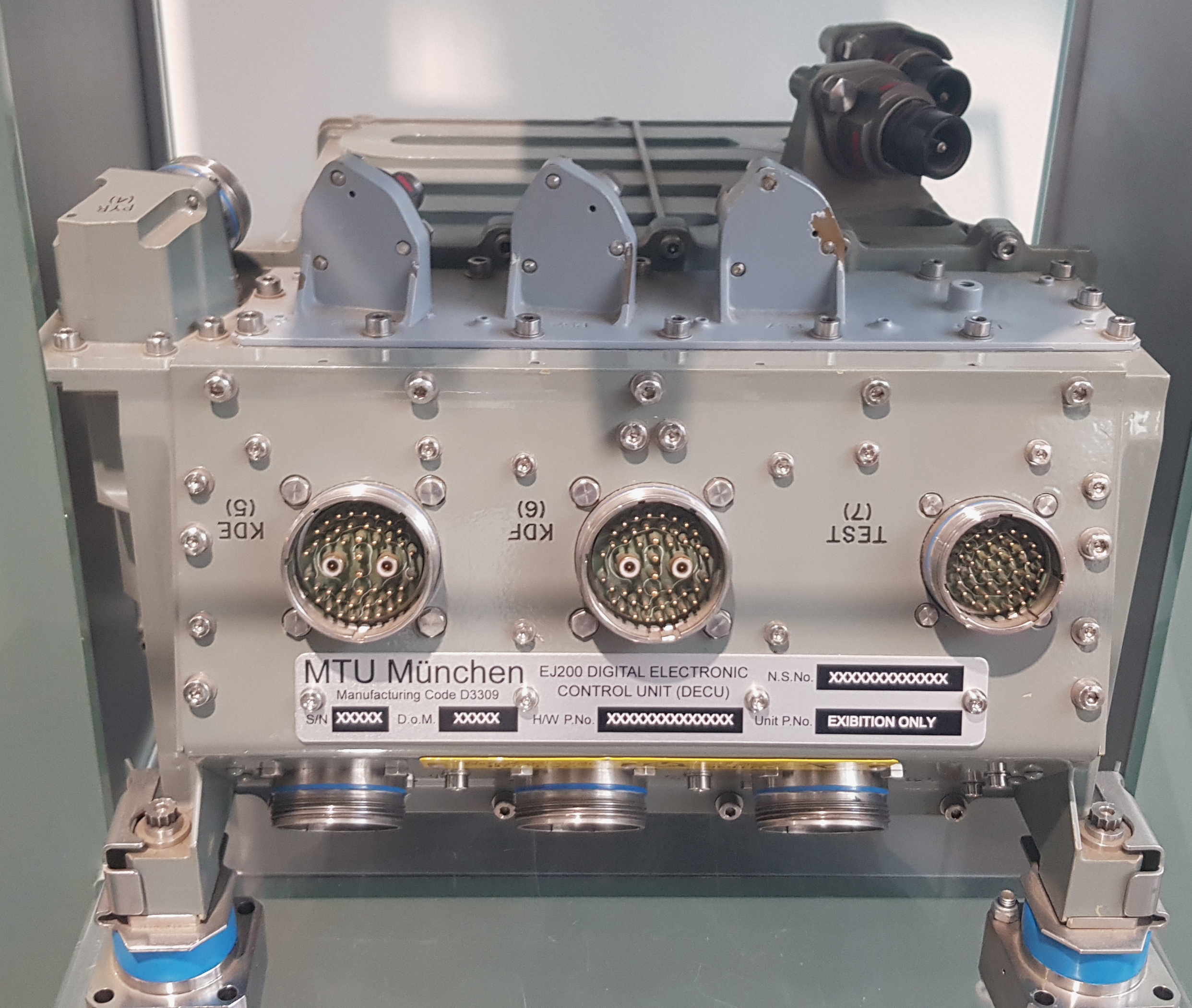
DECU/DECMU of a Eurojet EJ200D engine

The Eurojet EJ200 is a military low-bypass turbofan used as the powerplant of the Eurofighter Typhoon. The engine is largely based on the Rolls-Royce XG-40 technology demonstrator, which was developed in the 1980s. The EJ200 is built by the EuroJet Turbo GmbH consortium. The EJ200 is also used in the Bloodhound LSR supersonic land speed record attempting car.

== Development ==
=== Rolls-Royce XG-40 ===
Rolls-Royce began development of the XG-40 technology demonstrator engine in 1984. Development costs were met by the British government (85%) and Rolls-Royce.

On 2 August 1985, Italy, West Germany and the UK agreed to go ahead with the Eurofighter. The announcement of this agreement confirmed that France had chosen not to proceed as a member of the project. One issue was French insistence that the aircraft be powered by the Snecma M88, in development at the same time as the XG-40.

=== Eurojet EJ200 ===
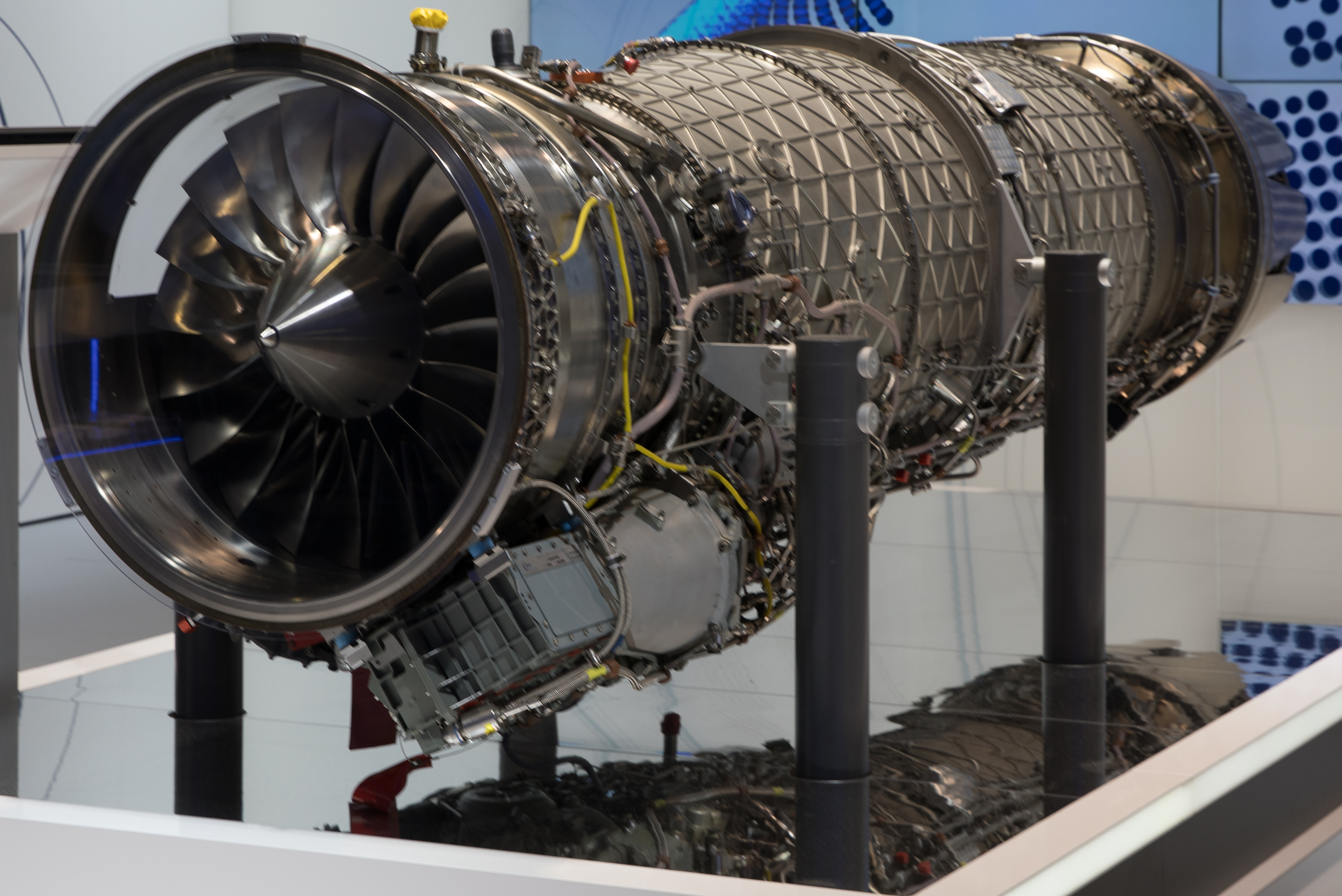
EJ200 displayed at ILA Berlin Air Show 2018

The Eurojet consortium was formed in 1986 to co-ordinate and manage the project largely based on XG-40 technology. In common with the XG-40, the EJ200 has a three-stage fan with a high pressure ratio, five-stage low-aspect-ratio high-pressure (HP) compressor, a combustor using advanced cooling and thermal protection, and single-stage HP and LP turbines with powder metallurgy discs and single crystal blades. A reheat system (afterburner) provides thrust augmentation. The variable area final nozzle is a convergent-divergent design.

==== EJ200 Mk100 ====
In December 2006, Eurojet completed deliveries of the 363 EJ200s for the Tranche 1 Eurofighters.

==== EJ200 Mk101 ====
Tranche 2 aircraft require 519 EJ200s. As of December 2006, Eurojet was contracted to produce a total of 1,400 engines for the Eurofighter project.

=== Landspeed record attempt ===
An EJ200 engine, together with a rocket engine, will power the Bloodhound LSR for an attempt at the land speed record. The target speed is at least 1000 mph.

=== BAE Systems Tempest ===
A pair of EJ200 engines are being used in the BAE Systems Tempest demonstrator, prior to a new production engine being developed for the Global Combat Air Programme.

=== Failed bids / cancelled programmes ===
==== EJ230 - HAL Tejas ====
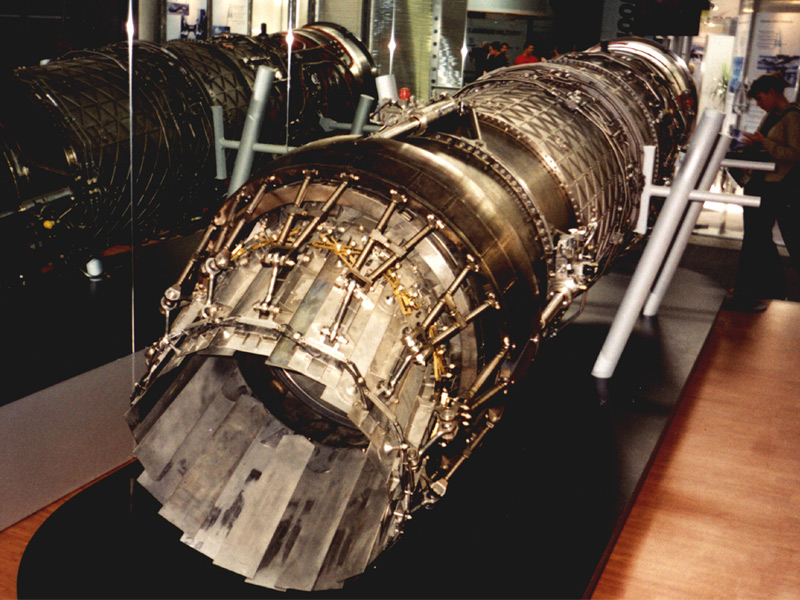
EJ200 Thrust vectoring prototype

In 2009, Eurojet entered a bid, in competition with the General Electric F414, to supply a thrust vectoring variant of the EJ200 to power the Indian HAL Tejas Mk2 after both the indigenous Kaveri engine and the General Electric F404 used in prototypes and early production models proved to have insufficient performance. After evaluation and acceptance of the technical offer provided by both Eurojet and GE Aviation, the IAF preferred the EJ200 as it is lighter and more compact but after the commercial quotes were compared in detail GE Aerospace was declared as the lowest bidder. A second consideration by HAL was industrial offsets: if local Eurojet engine production was set up for the Tejas it would make future Eurofighter aircraft bids to India cheaper and more competitive with the Tejas whereas it was assumed the US would not allow aircraft using the engine to be sold to India. However, in October 2020 Boeing offered to sell F/A-18 aircraft to the Indian Navy which uses the same GE F414 engine.

==== TAI TFX ====
On 20 January 2015, ASELSAN of Turkey and Eurojet Turbo GmbH signed a Memorandum of Understanding to collaborate on the EJ200 military turbofan engine programme. It was envisaged that the collaboration would produce a derivative of the EJ200 with thrust vectoring for use in Turkey's TFX (now Kaan) 5th generation air superiority fighter programme. However, the Eurojet EJ200 was not selected for the TFX program. Instead, the Kaan will use the General Electric F110 engine until indigenous manufacture by TEI and TRMOTOR.

==== KAI KF-21 Boramae ====
The EJ200 was one of the two possible engine options (the other was the GE F414) for the C103 design for the KF-21 (formerly KF-X) programme, but the Republic of Korea Air Force chose the F414-only C109 design.

==== Liquid fly-back booster ====
The Liquid fly-back booster programme was cancelled.

== Variants ==
=== EJ2x0 ===
Stage 1:

- The EJ2x0 with 20% growth compared to the original EJ200. The EJ2x0 engine will have dry thrust increasing to some 72 kN (or 16,200 lbf) with a reheated output of around 103 kN (or 23,100 lbf).

Stage 2:

- The new engine plans to increase the output 30% more power compared to the original EJ200. The engine will have dry thrust of around 78 kN (or 17,500 lbf) with a reheated output of around 120 kN (or 27,000 lbf).

Stage 3:

- 20 Eurofighter Tranche 5 approved for purchase in October 2025, to be equipped with the P3Ec stage 3 engine variant.

== Production ==
=== Consortium Eurofighter ===
The EJ200 production programme with the four participating Nations (Germany, UK, Italy and Spain) is contracted to produce 1400 engines for Eurofighter Typhoon.

Prototype (26)
26 EJ200 supplied for the 13 prototypes
Tranche 1 (363)
363 engines EJ200 Mk100
- Austria (36)
  - The Austrian engines were purchased as part of the common Tranche 1 purchase of 363. The Austrian Air Force purchased 36 EJ200 Mk100. The engines were modernised to Tranche 2 standard (EJ200 Mk101).
- Germany
- Italy
- Spain
- United Kingdom
Tranche 2 (519)
519 engines EJ200 Mk101:
- Germany
- Italy
- Spain
- United Kingdom
Tranche 3 (241)
241 EJ200 Mk 101 for Tranche 3:
- Germany
- Italy
- Spain
- United Kingdom
Tranche 4 (217)
163 EJ200 orders for the Tranche 4:
- Germany (56)
  - 56 ordered in November 2020, following the order of 38 Eurofighter Quadriga by the German Air Force. As of February 2024, 3 of this serie were manufactured. 20 engines that are in service to be refurbished also included in contract.
  - 20 Eurofighter to be ordered, the engines should be ordered soon.
- Italy (54)
  - 24 Eurofighter ordered, Italy ordered 54 engines in June 2025.
- Spain (107)
  - 48 ordered in June 2022, following the order of 20 Eurofighter with the Halcon I programme.
  - 59 ordered in December 2024, following the order of 25 Eurofighter with the Halcon II programme.

=== Export ===
Kuwait (60)
With the purchase of 28 Eurofighter T3, Kuwait purchased 60 EJ200 (4 spares). The last 5 engines were supplied in 2023.
Oman (27)
With the purchase of 12 Eurofighter T3, Oman purchased 27 EJ200 (3 spares).
In 2023, the 85% engine flight readiness of the engine was fulfilled.
Qatar (50)
With the purchase of 24 Eurofighter T3, Qatar purchased 50 engines (2 spares). The last 10 engines were supplied in 2023.
Saudi Arabia (155)
Saudi Arabia ordered 155 engines for its fleet of 72 Eurofighter (24 T2 and 48 T3). The contract was completed by 2016. In 2023, the 85% engine flight readiness of the engine was fulfilled.

== Applications ==
- Eurofighter Typhoon
- Bloodhound LSR
- Liquid fly-back booster (Cancelled)

== Specifications (EJ200) ==
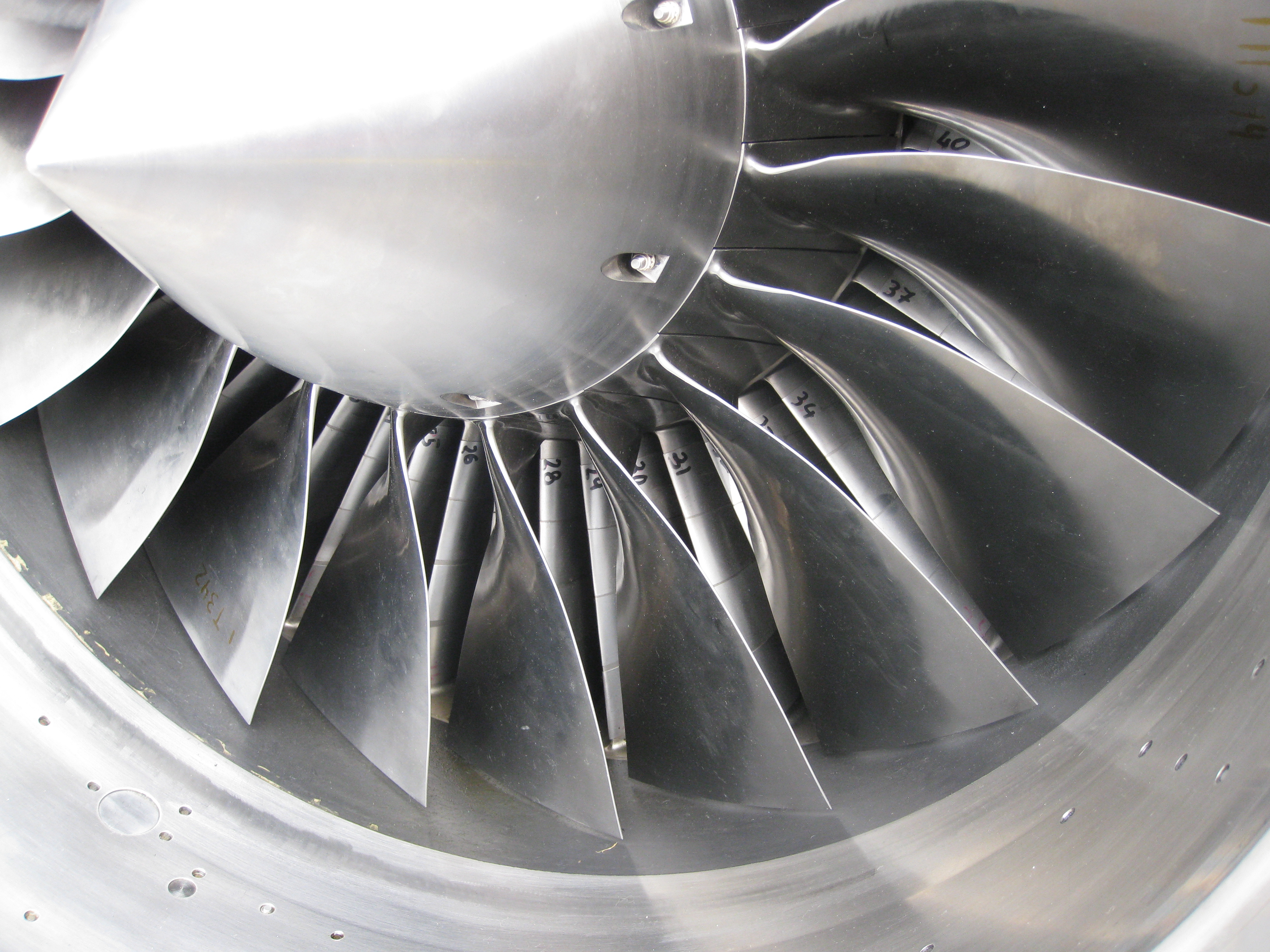
The compressor inlet, with both rotor and stator blades visible

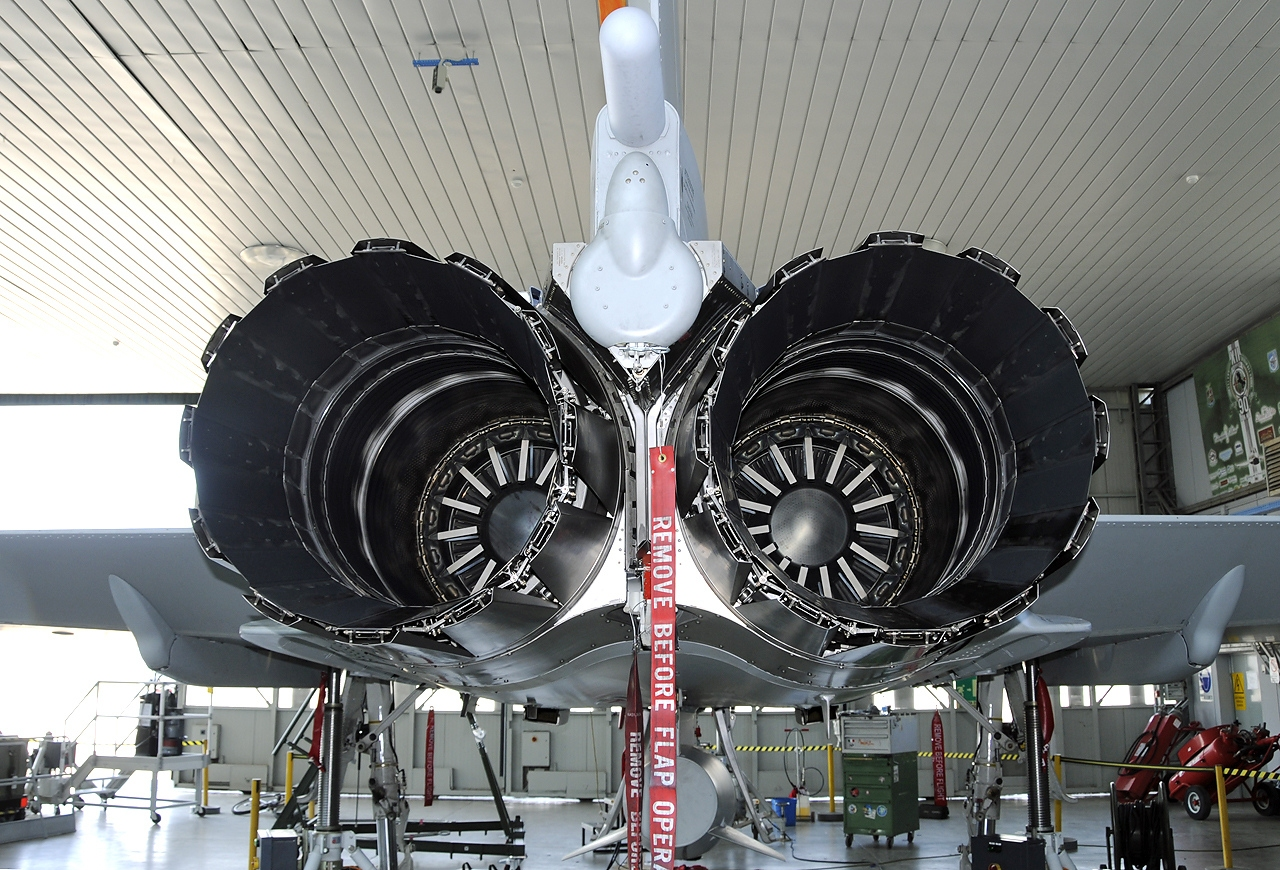
Afterburner combustion devices are the spoked assemblies

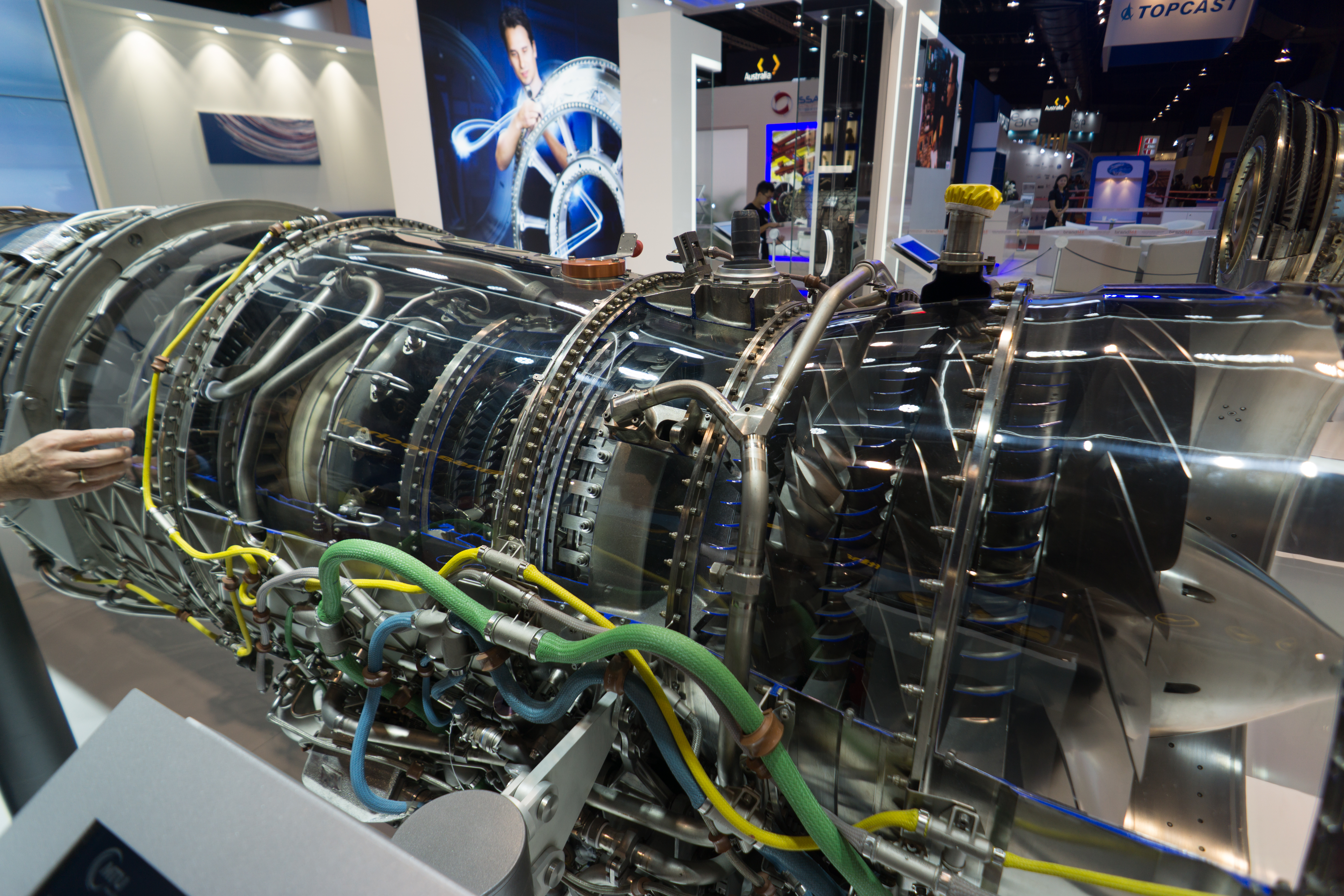
cutaway

Data from Rolls-Royce plc, EuroJet Turbo GmbH

==== General characteristics ====
- Type: Afterburning turbofan
- Length: 398.78 cm (157.00 in)
- Diameter: 73.66 cm (29.00 in)
- Dry weight: 989 kg (2,180 lb)

==== Components ====
- Compressor: Axial, 3-stage LP, 5-stage HP
- Combustors: Annular
- Turbine: 1-stage LP, 1-stage HP

==== Performance ====
- Maximum thrust: 60 kN (13,500 lbf) and 90 kN (20,200 lbf) (with reheat)
- Overall pressure ratio: 26:1
- Bypass ratio: 0.4:1
- Air mass flow: 75–77 kg/s (165–170 lb/s)
- Turbine inlet temperature: 1,800 K (1,527 °C; 2,780 °F)
- Fuel consumption: 4,536–4,968 kg/h (10,000–10,950 lb/h) and 15,228–15,876 kg/h (33,570–35,000 lb/h) (with reheat)
- Specific fuel consumption: 21–23 g/(kN⋅s) (0.74–0.81 lb/(lbf⋅h)) and 47–49 g/(kN⋅s) (1.66–1.73 lb/(lbf⋅h)) (with reheat)
- Thrust-to-weight ratio: 6.11:1 and 9.17:1 (with reheat)

== See also ==
Comparable engines

- General Electric F414
- Guizhou WS-13/19
- Klimov RD-33
- Snecma M88

Related lists

- List of aircraft engines
