= Eurocopter Tiger =

European attack helicopter

Eurocopter EC665 Tiger
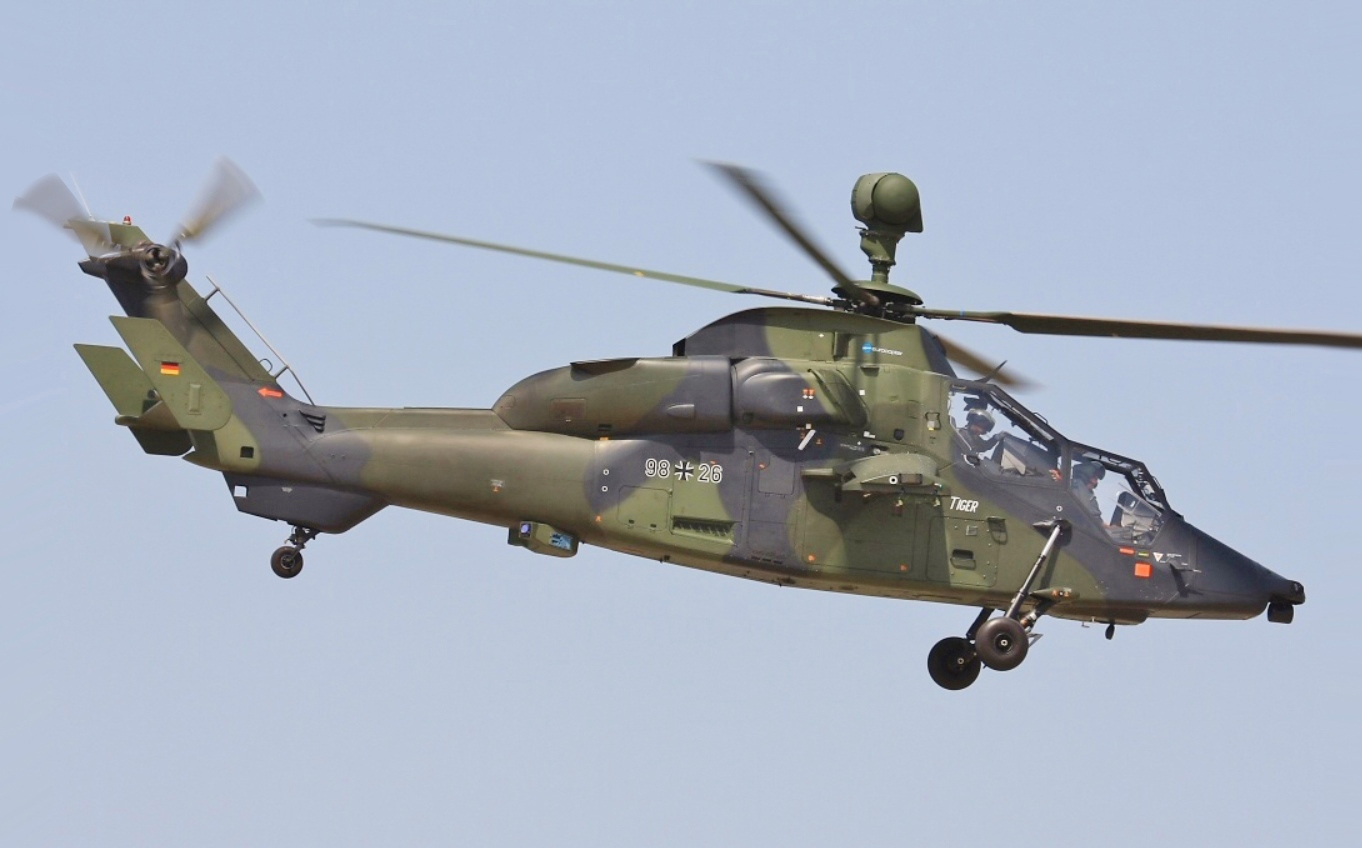
- Eurocopter Tiger of the German Army

General information
- Type: Attack helicopter; Anti-tank helicopter
- National origin: Multinational
- Manufacturer: Eurocopter; Airbus Helicopters
- Status: In service
- Primary users: French Army: German Army; Spanish Army; Australian Army (historical)
- Number built: 175 as of April 2026

History
- Manufactured: 1991–present
- Introduction date: 2003
- First flight: 27 April 1991
- Retired: By Australia, see § Operators; To be retired by Germany
- Variant: See § Variants

The Eurocopter EC665 Tiger, is a four-blade, twin-engine attack helicopter which first entered service in 2003. It is manufactured by Airbus Helicopters, formerly Eurocopter, which arose from the merger of Aérospatiale's and DASA's respective helicopter divisions. Airbus Helicopters designates it as the EC665. In France and Spain, the helicopter is known as the Tigre (which is French and Spanish for Tiger), while in Germany and Australia it is referred to as the Tiger. An earlier name for the French HAP close air support (CAS) version was Gerfaut ("Gyrfalcon"), which was dropped in 1993.

Development of the Tiger started during the Cold War, and it was initially intended as an anti-tank helicopter platform to be used against a Soviet ground invasion of Western Europe. During its prolonged development period the Soviet Union collapsed, changing the European security situation. France and Germany chose to proceed with the Tiger, developing it instead as a multirole attack helicopter. It achieved operational readiness in 2008.

The Tiger has the distinction of being the first all-composite helicopter developed in Europe; even the earliest models also incorporate other advanced features such as a glass cockpit, stealth technology, and high agility to increase its survivability. Improved variants have since entered service, outfitted with more powerful engines and compatible with a wider range of weapons. Since entering service, Tigers have been used in combat in Afghanistan, Libya, and Mali.

== Development ==
=== Origins and early development ===
In 1984, the French and West German governments issued a requirement for an advanced anti-tank helicopter, with one variant desired by the French dedicated to the escort and anti-helicopter role.

As originally planned, both countries would procure a total of 427 helicopters:

- West Germany planned on acquiring 212 models of the anti-tank variant named PAH-2 (Panzerabwehrhubschrauber, "Anti-Tank Helicopter"), with deliveries starting at the end of 1992.
- France wanted 75 models of the close air support variant named HAP "Gerfaut" (Hélicoptère d'Appui Protection – Gerfaut, "Support and Escort Helicopter – Gyrfalcon") and 140 models of the anti-tank variant named HAC "Tigre" (Hélicoptère Anti-Char – Tigre, "Anti-Tank Helicopter – Tiger"), with deliveries starting at the end of 1991 and 1995 respectively.

A joint venture consisting of Aérospatiale and MBB was subsequently chosen as the preferred supplier. In 1986, the development programme was effectively canceled due to spiraling costs; it had been officially calculated that supplying the German forces with an equivalent number of US-produced McDonnell Douglas AH-64 Apache attack helicopters would have been a considerably cheaper alternative to proceeding with the development of the Tiger. According to statements by the French Defence Minister André Giraud in April 1986, the collaborative effort had become more expensive than an individual national programme and was also forecast to take longer to complete. In July 1986, a government report into the project alleged that development had become distanced from the requirements and preferences of its military customers.

France and Germany reorganised the programme, including steps such as the adoption of fixed-term contracts which placed greater financial risk upon the private firms involved. Thomson CSF also took over the majority of Tiger's electronic development work, such as the visual systems and sensors. Despite the early development problems and the political uncertainty between 1984 and 1986, the program was formally relaunched in November 1987; it was at this point that a greater emphasis on the attack helicopter's anti-tank capabilities came about. Much of the project's organisational framework was rapidly redeveloped between 1987 and 1989; such as the installation of a Franco-German Helicopter Office to act as a program executive agency in May 1989.

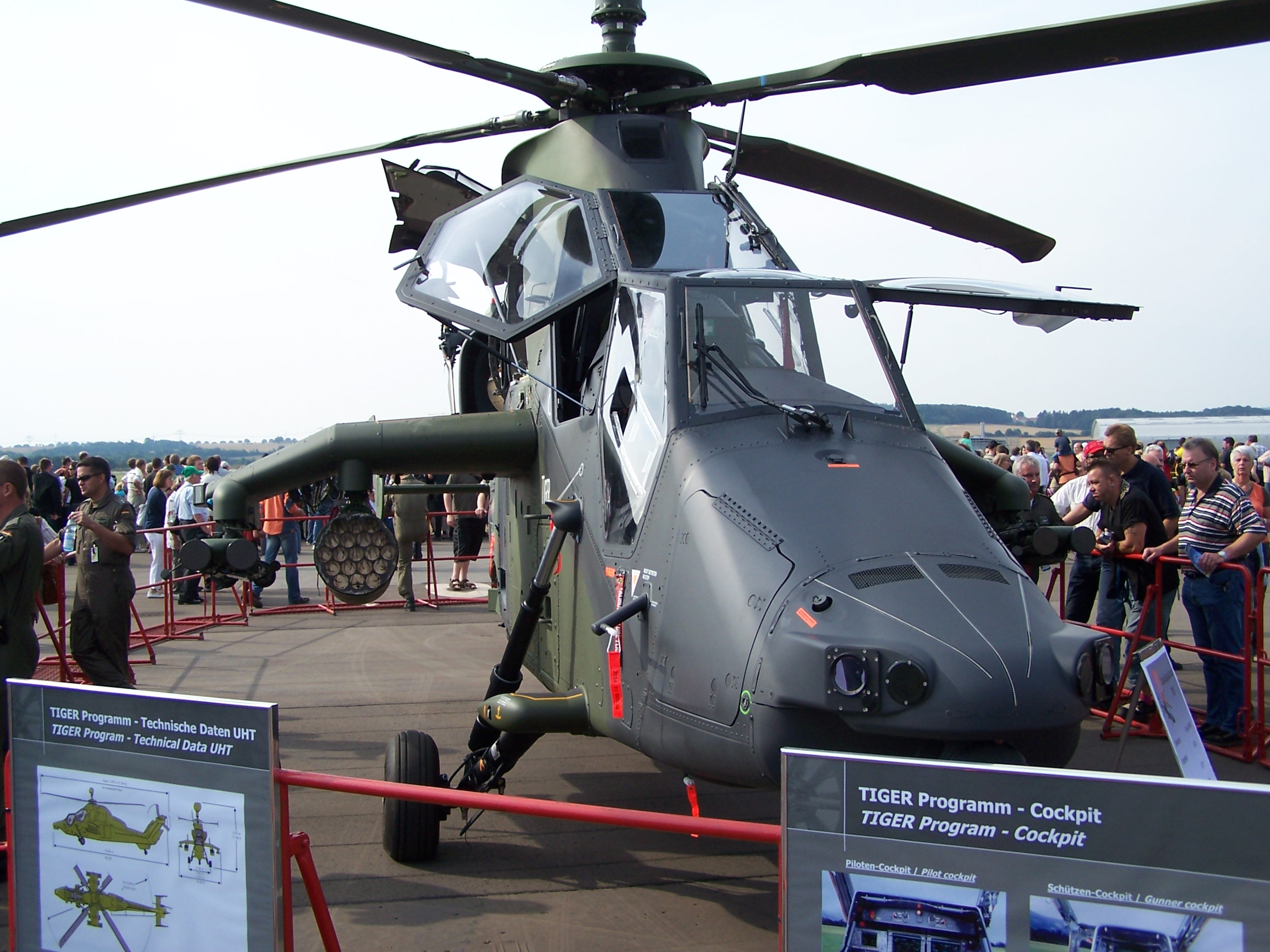
German Army Tiger UHT

In November 1989, Eurocopter signed an agreement that financially secured the majority of the helicopter's development through to serial production, including arrangements for two assembly lines to be built at Aerospatiale's Marignane plant and MBB's Donauwörth facility. This same arrangement also included the manufacture of five Tiger prototypes. Three were to operate as unarmed testbeds and the other two as armed combat prototypes with one for the French escort helicopter variant and the other for the German anti-tank variant. The first prototype took the Tiger's maiden flight on 27 April 1991 that lasted for 30 minutes.

Due to the end of the Cold War and subsequent defence budgets decreases in the 1990s, financial pressures led to further questions regarding the necessity for the entire program; in 1992 there was speculation that the German Defence Ministry might not continue with the project due to the requirement to make fiscal cutbacks. However, Germany was also increasingly keen for the Tiger to perform a wider assortment of missions; beyond being an excellent anti-tank platform, the specifications for the German platform were modified to include armed battlefield reconnaissance, close air support of ground troops, and escorting other helicopters.

In 1992, Aérospatiale and MBB, among other companies, merged to form the Eurocopter Group; this led to considerable consolidation of the aerospace industry and the Tiger project itself. A major agreement was struck in December 1996 between France and Germany that cemented the Tiger's prospects and committed the development of supporting elements, such as a series of new generation missile designs for use by the new helicopter. National political issues continued to affect the prospects of the Tiger, however. A proposed sale of up to 145 Tigers to Turkey proved a source of controversy; Turkey selected the Tiger as the preferred option, but conflicting attitudes between Eurocopter, France, and Germany in regards to military exports led to Turkey withdrawing its interest.

On 18 June 1999, Germany and France publicly placed orders for an initial batch of 160 Tiger helicopters, 80 for each nation, valued at €3.3 billion. On 22 March 2002, the first production Tiger was rolled out in a large ceremony held at Eurocopter's Donauwörth factory; although production models began initial acceptance trials in 2003, the first official delivery to the French Army took place on 18 March 2005; the first official Tiger delivery to Germany followed on 6 April 2005. Germany reduced its order to 57 in March 2013. In 2008 OCCAR estimated the project cost at €7,300,000,000. France's FY2013 budget put their share of the project at €6.4bn (~US$8.7bn), implying a programme cost of €14.7bn (~US$20.1bn) to the three main partners. The 2013 French White Paper changed the mix to 60 HAP and 20 of the more expensive HAD; at FY2013 prices, their HAP cost €27.4m/unit (~US$37m) and their HAD €36.1m/unit (~US$49m), including development costs the French Tigers cost €80m (~US$109m) each. In December 2015, France placed an additional order for 7 HAD helicopters, with the plan to upgrade the entire fleet to the HAD standard by 2025 for a total of 67 helicopters.

=== Exports ===
During the 1990s, export prospects for the Tiger had been invigorated by two large bids for orders from Britain and the Netherlands. Discreet talks between Britain and France regarding an association with the Tiger had been continuing since the late 1980s and, although Britain had initially dismissed industrial participation in the project, it was known by the mid 1990s that Britain was prepared to purchase modern attack helicopters from abroad. Eurocopter's management was keen to press production of the Tiger into action as soon as possible, as uncertainty over the date at which production, and therefore availability, would start was viewed as negatively impacting potential export deals. In both the Netherlands and Britain, a considerable amount of lobbying pressure was applied in the hopes of the Tiger's selection. However, neither country would order the Tiger.

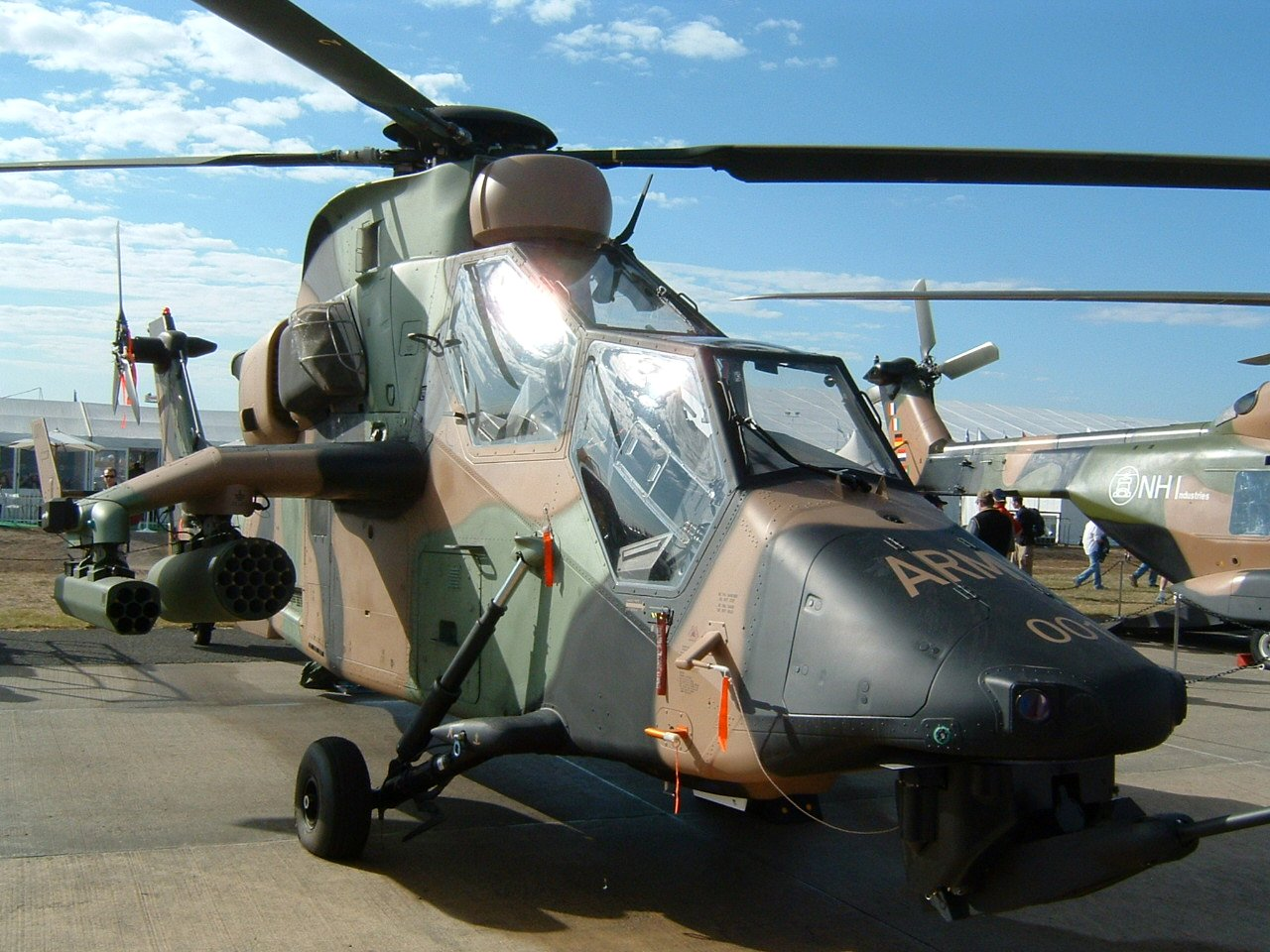
Australian Army ARH Tiger at Avalon Airport, Australia

On 21 December 2001, Eurocopter was awarded the contract to meet the Australian Army's "AIR 87 requirement" for 22 Tiger helicopters of the ARH (Armed Reconnaissance Helicopter) version. Modifications from the standard Tiger included new communications and avionics systems, as well as compatibility with Australian safety requirements. Per the contract's terms, 18 of the 22 aircraft were assembled at Australian Aerospace's Brisbane facility, a subsidiary of Eurocopter. On 1 July 2007, because of delays in attaining operational capability, Australia's Defence Materiel Organisation stopped all payments in regards to the procurement. According to Australia's Department of Defence, by 2008 the main issues had been addressed and payments resumed accordingly. In October 2010, it was revealed that the helicopters will not be fully operational for another two years. In December 2011, the final Tiger ARH was delivered to the Australian Army. In August 2019, Australia announced LAND 4503, the Tiger ARH replacement program.

In September 2003, Spain selected a variant of the Tiger HAP close air support helicopter – the Tiger HAD – for its army. The 24 helicopters of this type would be armed with the PARS 3 LR and Mistral missile systems, and feature uprated Enhanced MTR390 engines capable of lifting heavier payloads. Deliveries of the HAD variant began in 2007. The September 2003 arrangements not only involved a procurement deal but the induction of Spain into the Tiger program itself, leading to the greater integration of parts of Spain's aeronautics industry with the new multinational Eurocopter organisation. Shortly following Spain's order, France chose to not proceed with the pure anti-tank Tiger HAC variant, instead electing to procure the multirole-oriented Tiger HAD being procured by Spain.

In July 2006, the Saudi government signed a €6.9 billion contract for the sale of 142 helicopters, including 12 Tiger attack helicopters. However, in late 2007, the deal was cancelled for unknown reasons.

In May 2007, in response to an issued tender for 22 attack helicopters for the Indian Air Force, the Tiger was entered into a competition against multiple Russian and American helicopters. In late 2009, it was reported that the Tiger would not be able to participate in the Indian field trials as it was to undergo upgrades. In 2011, several Tigers participated in firing trials of the PARS 3 LR missile as part of a sales effort targeted at the Indian armed forces.

In 2012, the Tiger competed for a ₩1.8 trillion contract to provide up to 20 attack helicopters for South Korea, along with the Boeing AH-64 Apache and the TAI/AgustaWestland T-129; South Korea selected the AH-64 in April 2013. In January 2013, Eurocopter was reportedly in active discussions over potential Tiger procurements with Brazil, Malaysia, and Qatar. As of December 2015, the Tiger was reportedly contending for a Polish requirement for a new attack helicopter as a replacement for the Mil Mi-24 fleet.

== Design ==
=== Overview ===
The Tiger is capable of undertaking a wide range of combat missions, including armed reconnaissance and surveillance, anti-tank and close air support, escort and protection of friendly assets; and can operate during day or night in all weather conditions, and has been designed to include operations in the aftermath of nuclear, biological, or chemical warfare. The Tiger can also be used in the maritime environment, able to operate from the decks of ships including frigates, and during extreme weather conditions. Amongst the Tiger's notable qualities, it possesses very high levels of agility, much of which is attributed to the design of its 13-meter four-bladed hingeless main rotor; the Tiger can perform full loops and negative g manoeuvres. Power is provided by a pair of FADEC-controlled MTU Turbomeca Rolls-Royce MTR390 turboshaft engines.

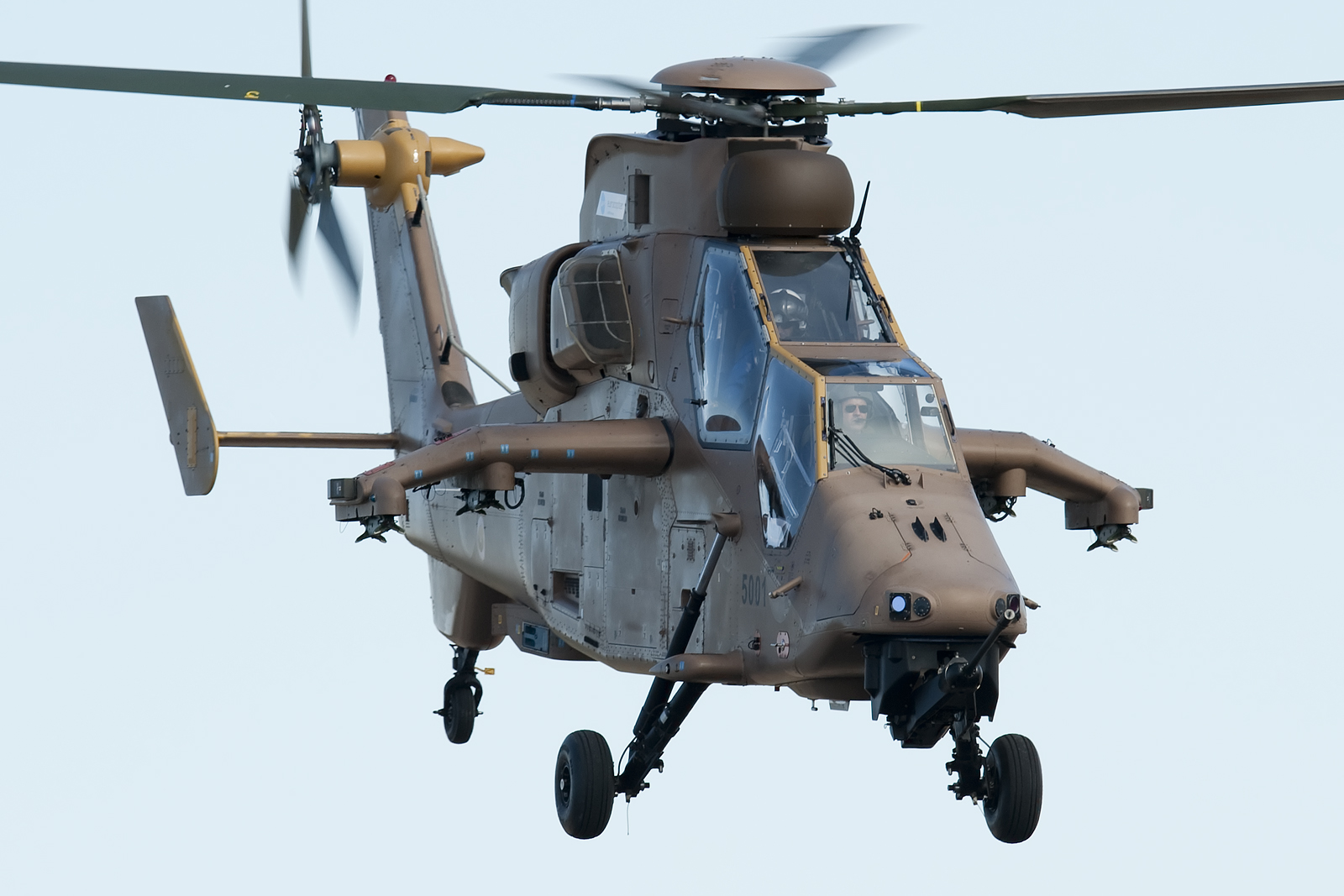
Tiger in flight, 2012

The Tiger has a tandem-seat 'glass cockpit' and is operated by a two-man crew; the pilot is placed in the forward position, with the gunner seated behind. Either of the crew members can manage the weapon systems or the primary flight controls, switching roles if necessitated; in addition to flying the aircraft, the Tiger's pilot would typically be in control of the self-defence systems and communications, as well as some secondary weapons functions. While some of the weapons use dedicated control interfaces, such as the anti-tank Trigat missile, air-to-air weapons can be managed via controls on both sets of collective and cyclic sticks.

Crew new to the Tiger have to undergo substantial retraining due to the differences from older platforms, particularly in higher workload management and the additional capabilities afforded by the type; one major change from preceding attack helicopters is a far greater degree of operational autonomy. According to Andrew Warner, chief test pilot during the Tiger's development, it is "the easiest-handling aircraft I have ever flown".

The system cost (helicopter, armament, support) and unit cost vary between variants; Australia's Tiger ARH has a price per unit of A$ 68 million, the latest Tiger HAD variant is estimated to cost US$44–48 million.

=== Survivability ===
The protection systems employed on the Tiger includes stealth; aspects such as the visual, radar, infrared and acoustic signatures have been minimised to better evade threats that may be present upon the battlefield. According to Andrew Warner, the Tiger's survivability "relies on stealth and agility". The use of composite materials on the airframe has resulted in reductions in radar cross-section (RCS), infrared and acoustic signatures to improve battlefield survivability. The fuselage is armoured and was developed to withstand small arms fire and 23 mm (0.91 in) cannon rounds. The helicopter has various radar/laser warning and missile approach detection systems, including EADS's AN/AAR-60 MILDS (Missile Launch Detection System), as well as flares and chaff dispensers.

The Tiger is the first all-composite helicopter developed in Europe. The fuselage of the Tiger is made from 80% carbon fibre reinforced polymer and kevlar, 11% aluminium, and 6% titanium. The entire tail section is made of composites, including the single section tail boom. The rotors are composed of a fibre plastic composite material able to withstand combat damage and bird strikes. The structure of the Tiger also incorporates protection against lightning strikes and electromagnetic pulses via an embedded copper/bronze grid and copper bonding foil.

The design of the Tiger includes a high degree of crash worthiness; many of the onboard systems have redundancies and are segregated to minimise the effect of damage. Components of the propulsion system, such as the rotors and drive shaft, were deliberately designed for greater ballistic tolerance than traditional designs; the gearbox is rated for a 60-minute dry run capability if lubrication is lost. Fuel is contained in two main internal fuel tanks, and an additional two smaller tanks are housed inside the stub wings. Fuel tanks have self-sealing capability to decrease the vulnerability. In the inhospitable conditions of the Afghanistan theatre, the Tiger had a reported operational availability of 90%.

=== Avionics and armaments ===
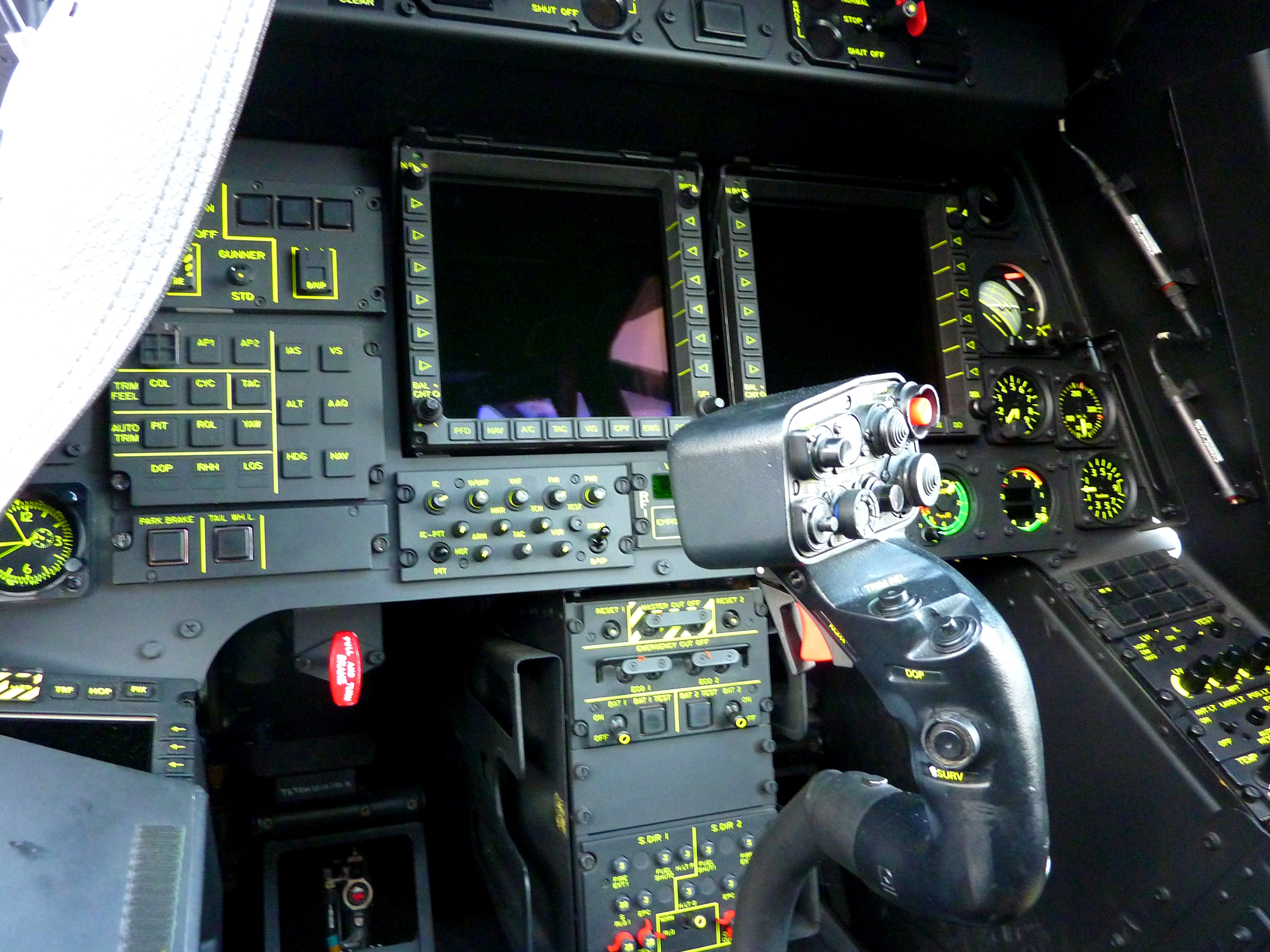
Forward cockpit of a Tiger HAP

Amongst the key avionics features of the aircraft are the EUROGRID battlefield management and map display systems, integrated communications (HF/VHF/FM radio and satellite) and data transfer links, a high-authority digital automatic flight control system, and redundant MIL 1553 data buses. Two redundant mission computers control the weapons, sensors, and targeting functions. The Tiger's navigational suite includes GPS, dual redundant inertial referencing, Doppler radar, separated air data units, radio altimeter and distributed air speed sensors. A dedicated nose-mounted forward-looking infrared (FLIR) sensor is used by the pilot for night time flying.

Each crew member has a pair of multifunction liquid crystal data displays at their control station, typically used to display internal systems information and sensory data, and to interact with the aircraft's higher systems. An additional display system is available to both crew in the form of the helmet-mounted display (HMD). The HMD is used by the flying pilot to display basic flight data with digitally enhanced optics, such as night vision or infrared imagery from the sensors, superimposed against; the gunner can use the HMD to interact with and control onboard weapon systems and view targeting data.

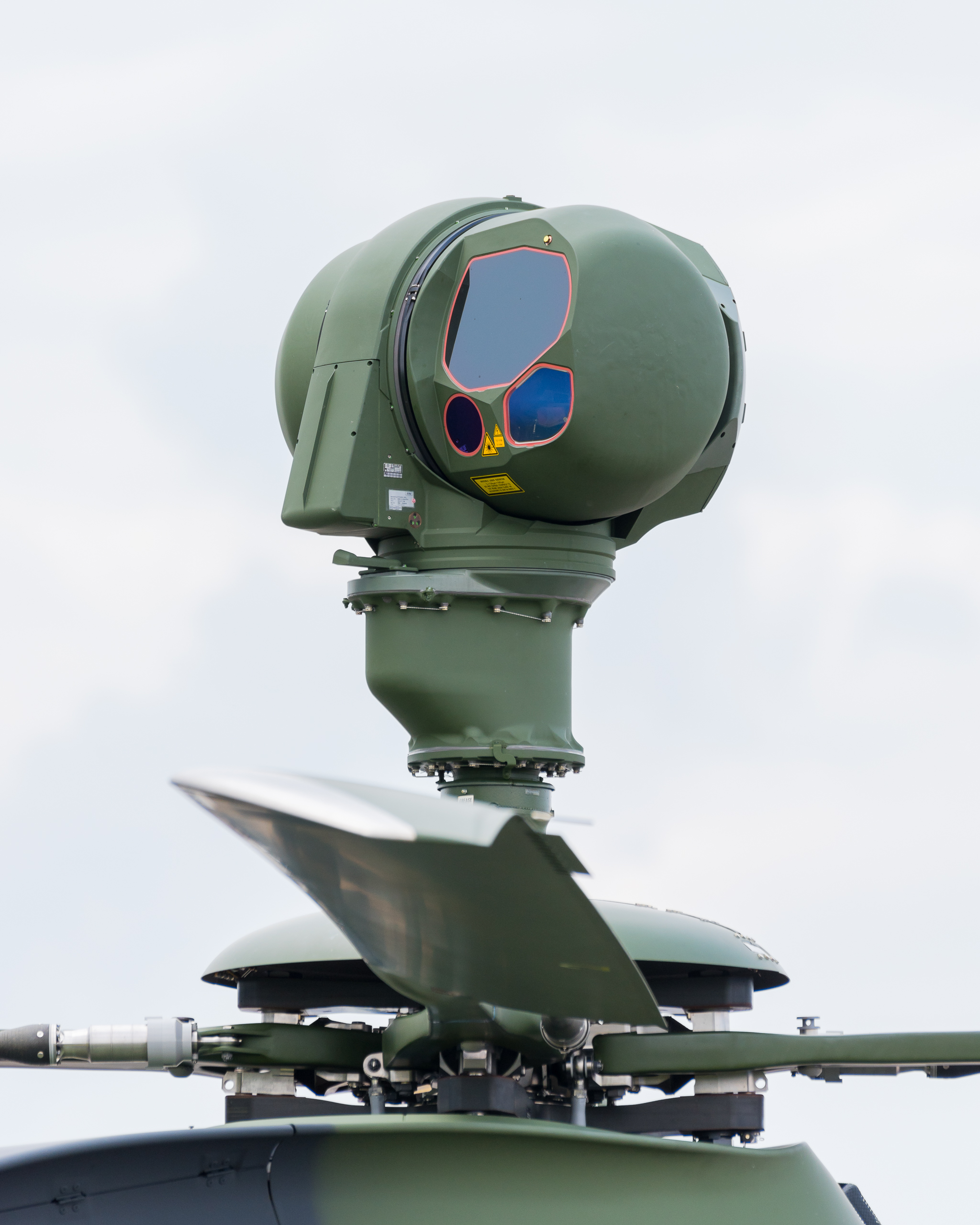
Mast above the rotor head with the Osiris system

Perhaps the most significant single avionics system fitted upon the Tiger is the mast-mounted Osiris sight/sensor; this incorporates optical TV and thermal cameras, a laser range finder/tracker/designator, and multiple gyroscopes for stabilisation. Osiris performs as the main sensor for target observation and acquisition, providing firing and targeting data via the weapons computer; Osiris also enables entirely passive target acquisition to be undertaken and was developed to maximise the capabilities of the Trigat anti-tank missile developed in parallel to the Tiger itself. An alternative optical system to Osiris is mounted on the aircraft's roof upon some variants.

The Tiger can be fitted with various armaments including rockets, cannons, and a range of air-to-air and air-to-surface missiles, controlled via a dedicated weapons control computer. Munitions for anti-ground warfare include the nose-mounted 30 mm Nexter turret; an assortment of external gun pods, anti-tank missiles, and up to four launchers for 70 and 68 mm rockets can be mounted on the Tiger's stub wings. When deploying missiles such as the Mistral, the Tiger is capable of taking advantage of the munition's off-boresight capabilities. A guided 70 mm rocket will be developed for the Tiger based on the Roketsan Cirit.

== Operational history ==
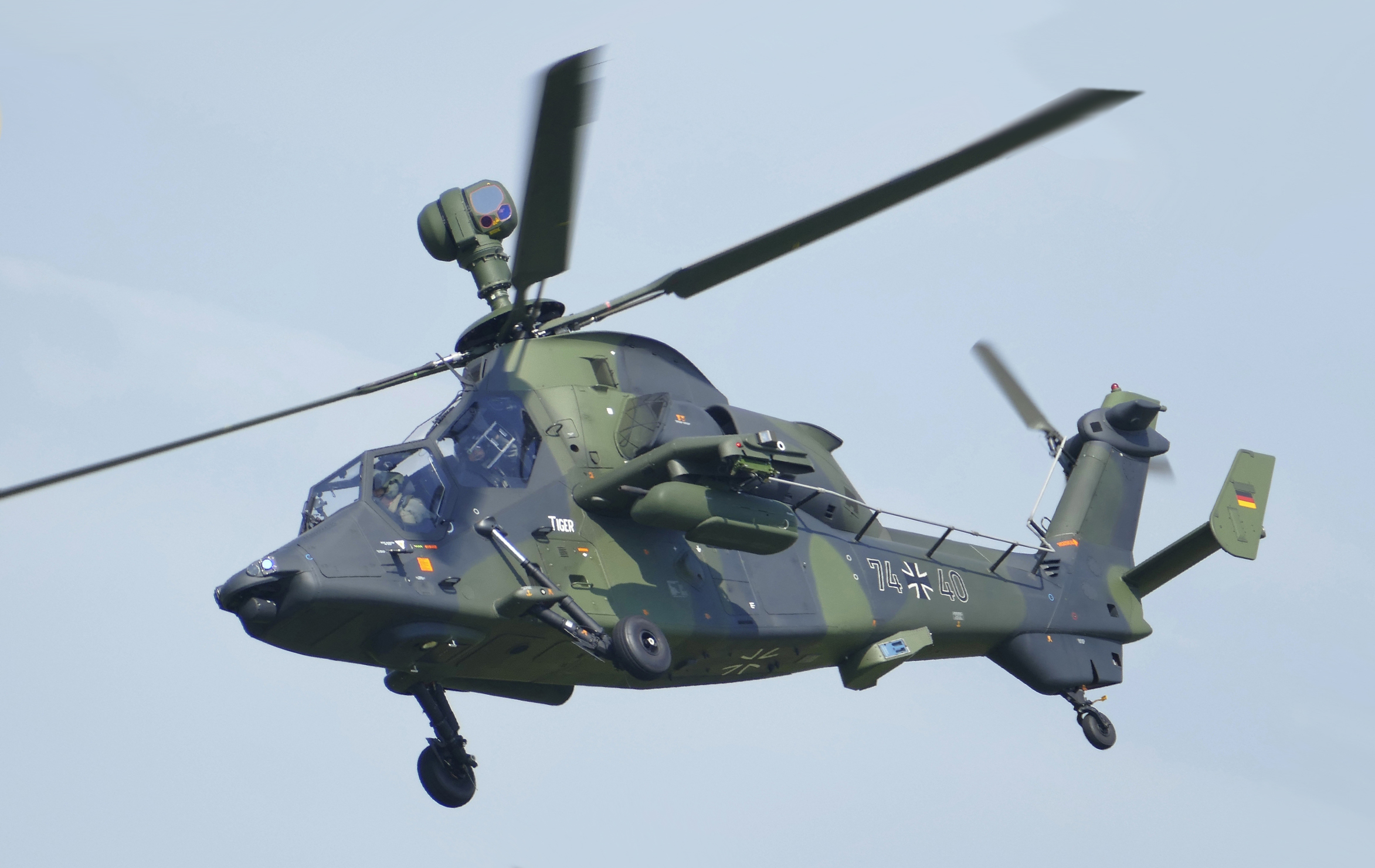
In 2013 a German Army Tiger UHT fired its weapons for the first time in a close air support mission.

In December 2008, final qualification of the HAP and UHT variants of the Tiger was completed, marking the platform's readiness for operational duties overseas. In May 2009, the Tiger participated in readiness trials off the coast of Toulon to clear the type for active shipboard deployments. By November 2009, nearly 50 Tigers had been delivered to customers and the worldwide fleet had accumulated more than 13,000 flight hours.

In July 2009, three French Tiger HAP helicopters of the 5th Helicopter Regiment arrived at Kabul International Airport in Afghanistan, marking the first active deployment of the Tiger into an active combat zone. The helicopters performed armed reconnaissance and fire support missions, acting in support of coalition ground troops fighting a Taliban insurgency. The Tigers had their operational certification in Afghanistan in early August 2009; one French officer described the Tiger's role in the theatre as "find, attack, suppress, seize, raid, and support". By July 2010, it was reported that the Tiger detachment had totalled 1,000 operational hours in Afghanistan. On 4 February 2011, a French Tiger crashed during a night time operation about 30 miles east of Kabul and both crew members suffered light injuries.

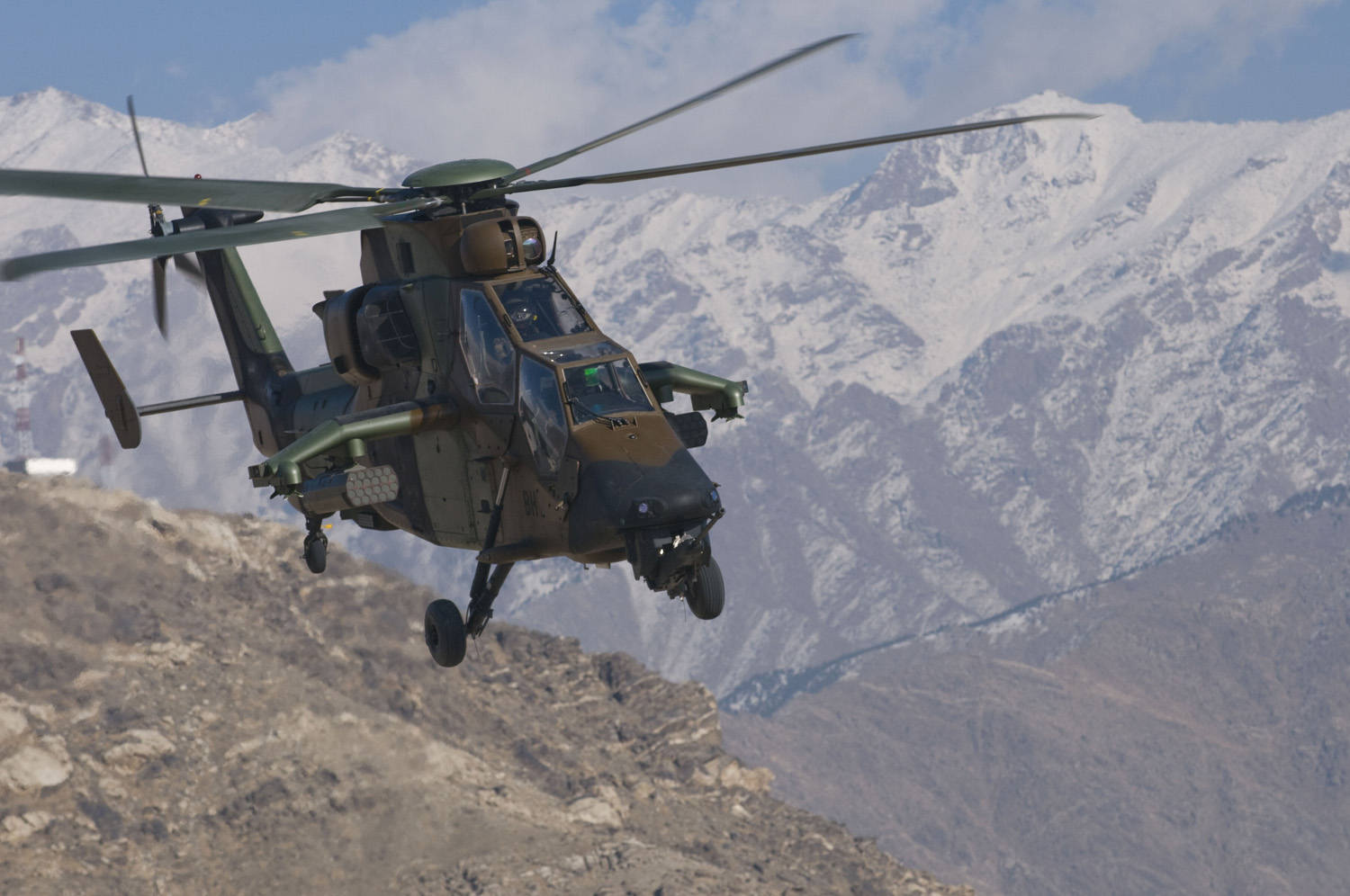
A French Army EC-665 Tiger during a firing exercise from Forward Operating Base Morales-Frazier on January 23, 2011 in Kapissa, Afghanistan

In August 2009, the German magazine Der Spiegel reported that the ten operational Tigers in the German Army were only suitable for pilot training, while others had not been accepted due to defects. In May 2010, Germany suspended deliveries over "serious defects particularly with wiring"; in response Eurocopter stated that "Corrective measures related to wiring problems have been developed, agreed by the customer and are being implemented", and that two corrected helicopters would soon be handed over to the German military.

During the 2011 military intervention in Libya, France deployed the French ship Tonnerre amphibious assault helicopter carrier, carrying a number of Tiger attack helicopters aboard, to the Libyan coast to conduct military operations upon military targets within the country. On 4 June 2011, French Tigers, alongside British Army Apache helicopters, began conducting combat operations in Libya.

In December 2012, a four-ship flight of German Tiger UHTs was deployed to Afghanistan. Operating from Mazar-i-Sharif, they performed reconnaissance, ground support, and convoy protection missions. All had previously undergone upgrades under the ASGARD programme; the modifications include the addition of new defensive systems, sand filters for the MTR390 engines, and enhancements to the communications suite. Between 30 January 2013 and 30 June 2014, the German Tigers flew 1,860 hours and 260 sorties supporting NATO ground troops, Afghan security forces, and humanitarian relief efforts after floods. The model fired its first shots during combat in German service on 4 May 2013, providing armed overwatch to special forces troops with unguided rockets and machine gun fire. The German Army received its last ASGARD-upgraded Tigers in March 2014.

In March 2013, Spain also deployed three Tiger HADs to the region to provide support to the Spanish ground forces.

In January 2013, as part of France's intervention in the Northern Mali conflict, a small number of Tigers were deployed for combat operations to that theatre. Early production HADs (Block 1) followed in November 2014 after having been declared combat capable. In March 2017, German Tigers were rotated into the same country in support of MINUSMA, relieving Apaches of the Royal Netherlands Air Force. On 26 July, one of the aircraft in question crashed in the desert 700 kilometres north of Gao, killing both pilots. A subsequent investigation discovered that mistakes by improperly trained civilian maintenance contractors had caused a fatal malfunction.

== Variants ==
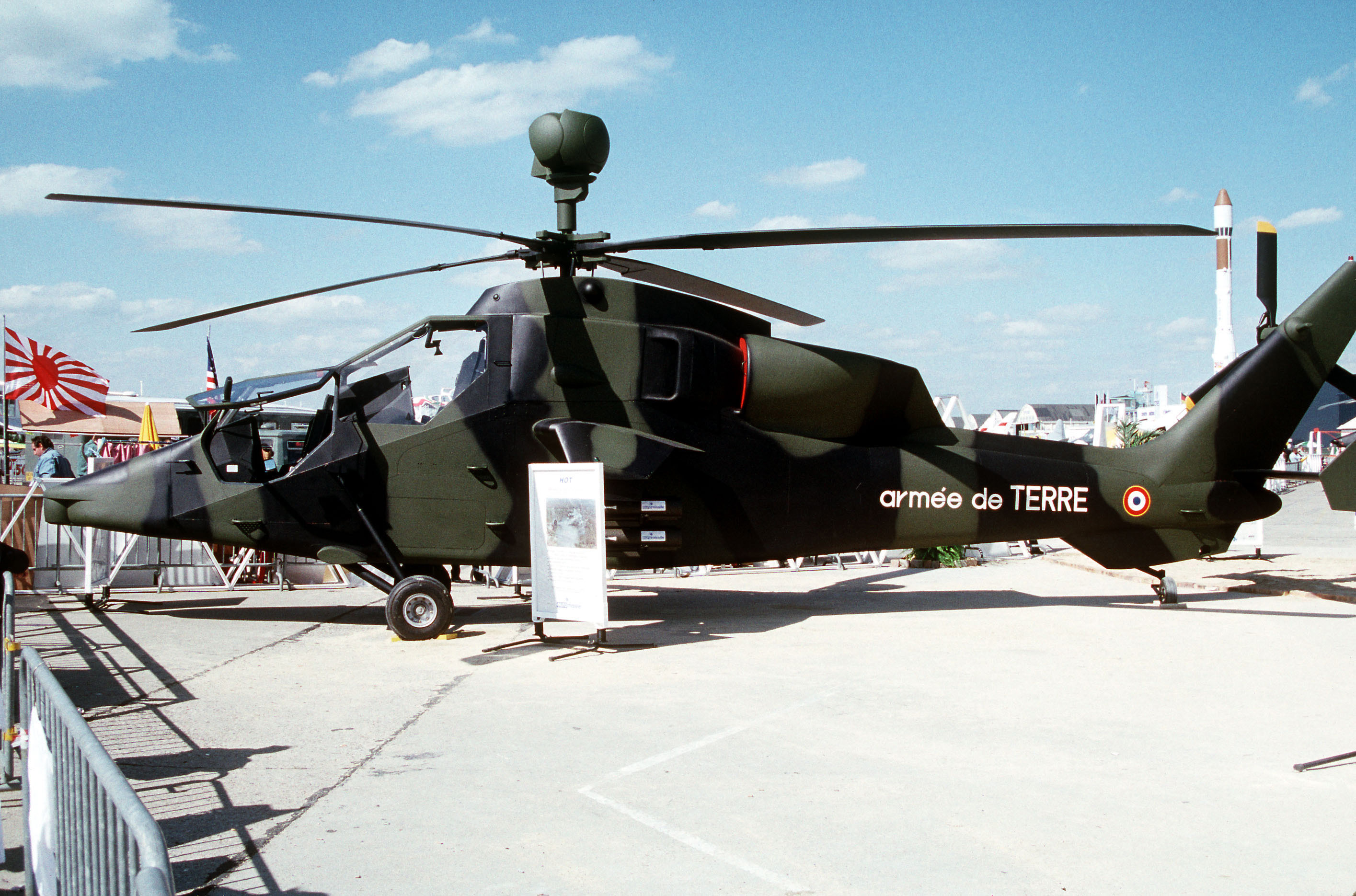
Tiger HAC (Hélicoptère Anti-Char, "Anti-Tank Helicopter") mockup on display at the 1991 Paris Air Show.

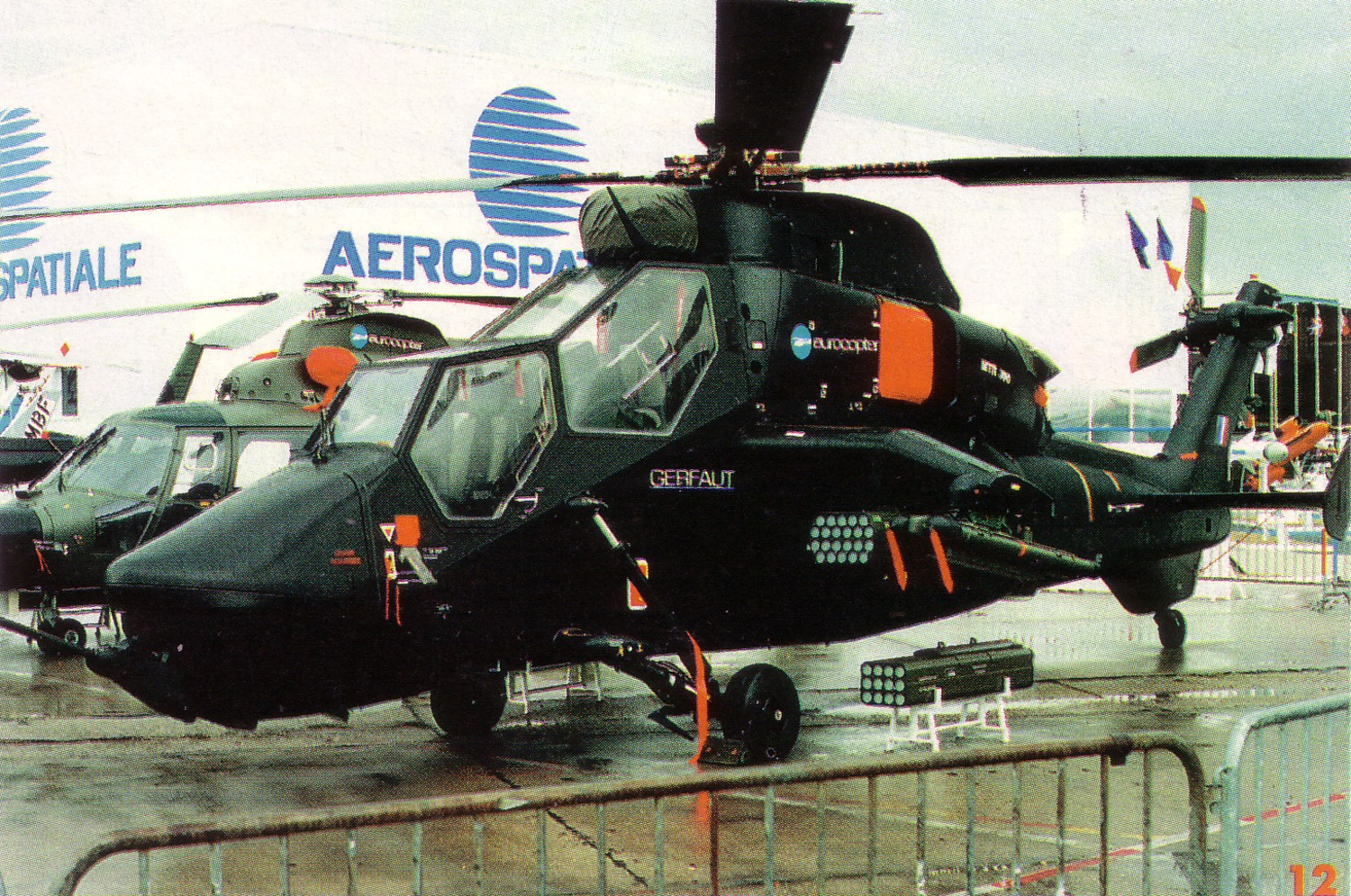
Tiger HAP (Hélicoptère d'Appui et de Protection, "Support and Escort Helicopter"), marked Gerfaut ("Gyrfalcon"), on display at the 1993 Paris Air Show.

- HAC – Hélicoptère Anti-Char "Tigre" (French for 'Anti-Tank Helicopter "Tiger"') – Basic Anti-tank model with a SFIM Osiris mast-mounted sight and nose-mounted thermal imager, originally intended for the French Army Light Aviation (ALAT).
- HAP – Hélicoptère d'Appui et Protection "Gerfaut" (French for 'Support and Escort Helicopter "Gyrfalcon"') – Close air support model with a SFIM Strix roof-mounted sight and 30 mm cannon chin-mounted turret, intended for the French Army (Gerfaut name dropped late 1993). From 2026 onward, there will be no more HAP variants.
  - HAP-F – Hélicoptère d'Appui et Protection – France (French for 'Support and Escort Helicopter – France') – French model of the Tiger HAP. 40 delivered; under retrofit to reach the HAD-F configuration.
  - HAP-E – Helicóptero de Apoyo y Protection – España (Spanish for 'Support and Escort Helicopter – Spain') – Spanish model of the Tiger HAP. Entered service in 2005; 6 delivered; decommissioned at the end of 2020.
- HAD – Hélicoptère d'Appui Destruction (French for 'Support and Destruction Helicopter') – Attack model of the Tiger with a SFIM Strix roof-mounted sight and 30 mm cannon chin-mounted turret. It is powered by an uprated MTR390-E (MTR390 Enhanced), approximately 14% more powerful than the original MTR390-2C.
  - HAD-F Mk I – Hélicoptère d'Appui et Destruction – France Mark I (French for 'Support and Destruction Helicopter – France Mark I') – French model of the Tiger HAD, initial design. 31 delivered with the HAP-F being converted to this standard.
  - HAD-F Mk II – Hélicoptère d'Appui et Destruction – France Mark II (French for 'Support and Destruction Helicopter – France Mark II') – Retrofitted French HAD-F into Mk II standard. First delivery on 25 October 2024.
  - HAD-F Mk III – Hélicoptère d'Appui et Destruction – France Mark III (French for 'Support and Destruction Helicopter – France Mark III') – Retrofitted French HAD-F into Mk III standard. 67 helicopters will be modified.
  - HAD-E – Helicóptero de Ataque y Destrucción – España (Spanish for 'Attack and Destruction Helicopter – Spain') – Spanish model of the Tiger HAD. Entered service in 2005; 18 delivered.
  - HAD-E Mk III – Helicóptero de Ataque y Destrucción – España Mark III (Spanish for 'Attack and Destruction Helicopter – Spain Mark III') – Retrofitted Spanish HAD-E into Mk III standard. 18 helicopters will be modified.
- HCP – Hélicoptère de Combat Polyvalent (French for 'Multi-role Combat Helicopter') – Multi-role version derived from the HAP, intended for export.
- PAH-2 – Panzerabwehrhubschrauber der 2. Generation (German for '2. generation Anti-Tank Helicopter') – Anti-tank model with a SFIM Osiris mast-mounted sight and nose-mounted thermal imager, intended for Germany, development of which was canceled in 1993.
- UHT – Unterstützungshubschrauber Tiger (German for 'Support Helicopter Tiger') – Close air support version with limited antitank capability, fitted with a SFIM Osiris mast-mounted sight and nose-mounted thermal imager, intended for Germany. 68 delivered by 2025. Previously called UHU (Unterstuetzungs-HUbschrauber, "Support Helicopter").
  - KHT – Kampfhubschrauber Tiger (German for 'Attack Helicopter Tiger') – Attack version surpassing the UHT in 2013, fitted with a SFIM Osiris mast-mounted sight and nose-mounted thermal imager, intended for Germany.
  - UHT Mk III – Unterstützungshubschrauber Tiger Mark III (German for 'Support Helicopter Tiger Mark III') – Proposed Mk III upgrade of the German UHT. 53 helicopters proposed. Cancelled in favour of 82 new light attack helicopters under the codename LKH (Leichter Kampfhubschrauber).
- ARH – Armed Reconnaissance Helicopter – Hybrid version based on the Tiger HAC and HAP with roof-mounted sight and 30 mm chin-mounted turret, intended for Australia.

=== Prototypes ===
- PT1 (Prototype Tiger 1: F-ZWWW) – Aerodynamic prototype with basic avionics and aerodynamic mockups of mast-mounted and roof-mounted sights, nose-mounted gun and weapon containers. First flight on 29 April 1991. Relegated to ground fatigue testing and static display in early 1996 on completion of flight programme. Flown 502 hours.
- PT2 (Prototype Tiger 2: F-ZWWY) – Aerodynamic prototype in HAP configuration with full core avionics. Rolled out 9 November 1992; first flight 22 April 1993.
  - PT2R (Prototype Tiger 2 Retrofit) – Retrofit with HAP systems, completed in November 1996.
  - PT2R2 (Prototype Tiger 2 Retrofit 2) – Retrofit with HAP systems, completed in April 2000.
  - PT2X (Prototype Tiger 2 Experimental) – Redesignated PT2X in 2001 to serve as multimission demonstrator, adding LFK/ SAGEM sighting system for HOT-3 anti-tank missiles in addition to original Mistral missiles and rockets.
- PT3 (Prototype Tiger 3: F-ZWWT, 9823) – Full core avionics prototype, including navigation and autopilot. First flight (as F-ZWWT) 19 November 1993.
  - PT3R (Prototype Tiger 3 Retrofit) – Retrofit with UHT systems, beginning in February 1997.
- PT4 (Prototype Tiger 4: F-ZWWU) – Aerodynamic prototype in HAP configuration with full core avionics, including roof sight, HUD and Topowl helmet sight. First flight 15 December 1994, the first Tiger with live weapons system. Flown 296 hours to 1 December 1997; crashed during night low-level evaluation by Australian Army 17 February 1998.
- PT5 (Prototype Tiger 5: F-ZWWT, 9825) – UHT prototype with full avionics and Osiris mast-mounted sight. First flight 21 February 1996.
  - PT5R (Prototype Tiger 5 Retrofit) – Retrofit with production-standard weapon system. First flight 8 October 1999.
- Tiger PT6 (Prototype Tiger 6) – Static test airframes for fatigue and crash-resistance trials.
- Tiger PT7 (Prototype Tiger 7) – Static test airframes for fatigue and crash-resistance trials.

=== Tiger KHT/UHT ===
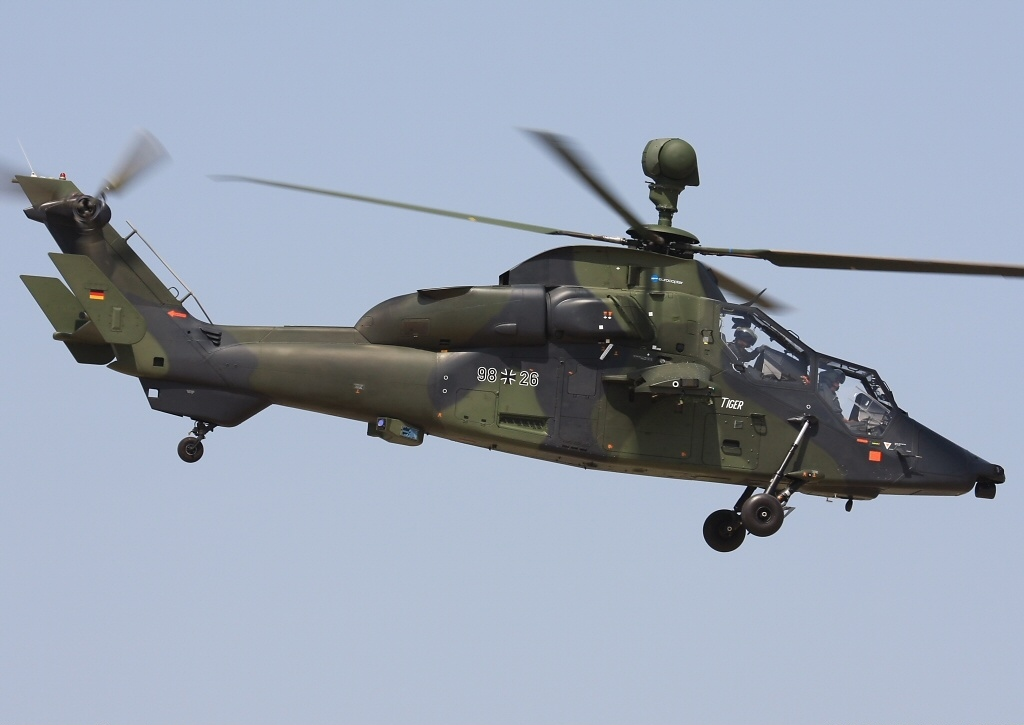
Tiger UHT

The KHT (from Kampfhubschrauber Tiger, German for "Attack Helicopter Tiger") is a medium-weight multi-role fire support helicopter built for the Bundeswehr (German Armed Forces). Until October 2013 its designation was UHT (from Unterstützungshubschrauber Tiger, German for "Support Helicopter Tiger"). Under an agreement between the German government and Eurocopter made in March 2013, a total of 51 Tiger UHs will enter service. The KHT can carry PARS 3 LR "fire and forget" and/or HOT3 anti-tank missiles as well as 70 mm (2.8 in) Hydra 70 air-to-ground fire support rockets from Belgium manufacturer Forges de Zeebrugge (FZ). Four AIM-92 Stinger missiles (two on each side) are mounted for air-to-air combat. Unlike the HAP/HCP version it has no integrated gun turret, but a 12.7 mm (0.50 in) gunpod can be fitted if needed. The weapon configuration was designed to be multirole and easily convertible to cover the whole spectrum of possible mission scenarios and to be effective against a broad range of targets. Another difference is the use of a mast-mounted sight, which has second-generation infrared and CCD TV cameras (range 18 km).

=== Tiger HAC ===
The Tiger HAC (Hélicoptère Anti-Char, "Anti-Tank Helicopter") was an intended French anti-tank version with the Osiris mast-mounted sight and nose-mounted thermal imager, originally intended for the French Army Light Aviation (ALAT).

A HAC demonstrator was displayed at the 1991 Paris Air Show.

=== Tiger HAP ===
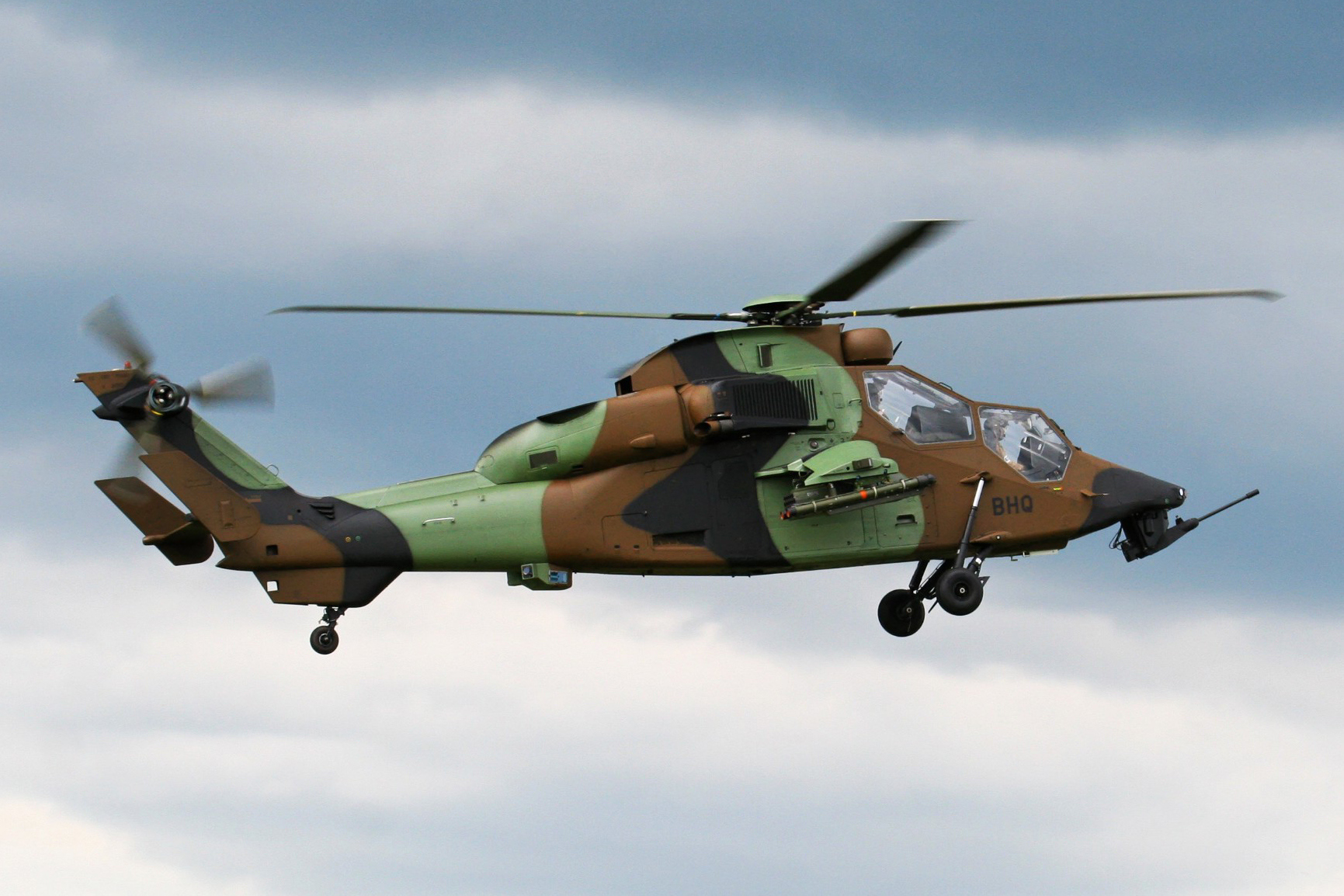
Tiger HAP

The Tiger HAP (Hélicoptère d'Appui Protection, "Support and Escort Helicopter") French for "Multipurpose Combat Helicopter" is a medium-weight air-to-air combat and fire support helicopter built for the French Army. It is fitted with a chin-mounted GIAT 30 mm gun turret (GIAT AM-30781) and can carry 68 mm SNEB unguided rockets or 20 mm machine cannons for the fire support role as well as Mistral air-to-air missiles.

France's 40 HAP were delivered by 2012 at a cost of €27m/unit (~US$36m) in 2012 prices. In December 2015, France decided to upgrade its entire existing Tiger fleet to the HAD standard by 2025.

From 2026 onward, there will be no more HAP variant as HAP-E has been decommissioned end of 2020 and HAP-F are currently under retrofit to reach the HAD-F configuration.

=== Tiger HAD ===
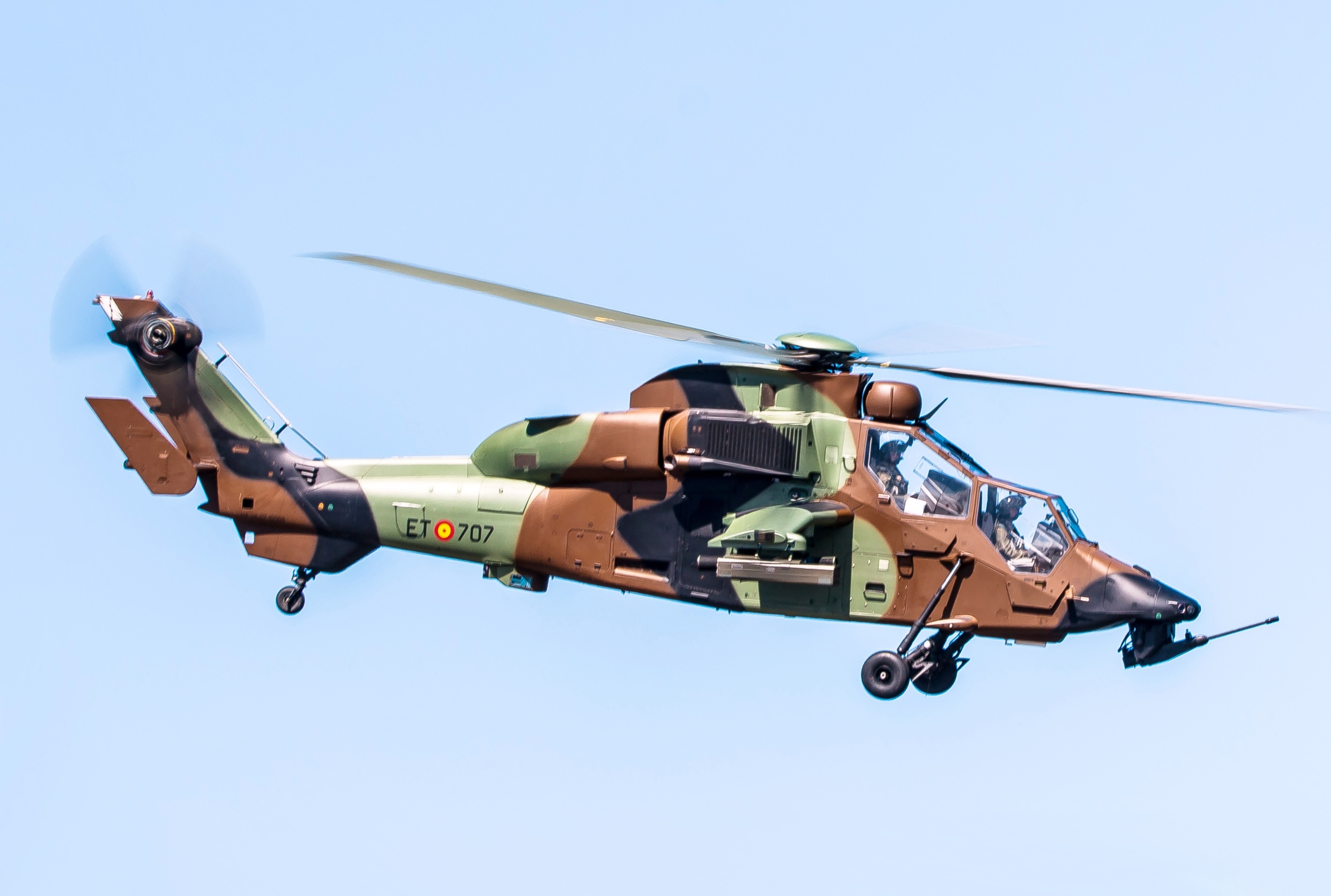
Tiger HAD

The Tiger HAD (French: Hélicoptère d'Appui Destruction, Spanish: Helicóptero de Apoyo y Destrucción, "Support Attack Helicopter") version is essentially identical to the HAP version but better suited for operations in hot environments, with 14% more engine power available due to the upgraded Enhanced MTR390 engines (1,092 kW / 1,464 shp during normal operation; 1,322 kW / 1,774 shp in contingency power mode), maximum take-off weight is increased to 6,600 kg, communication suite is expanded with Up Link and Down Link satellite antenna and better ballistic protection as a result of the specific requests made by the Spanish Army. It is equipped with the Hellfire II and the Spike ER anti-armour missiles. It is suited for attack, escort, ground fire support, armed reconnaissance and air-to-air combat roles.

It was selected by the Spanish Army, and the French Army Light Aviation (ALAT) decided to upgrade most of their HAP helicopters to the HAD variant. In December 2004, Spain ordered 24 of the HAD variant and France ordered 40 HADs. France's 40 HAD will cost €35.6m/unit (~US$48m) in 2012 prices.

=== Tiger ARH ===
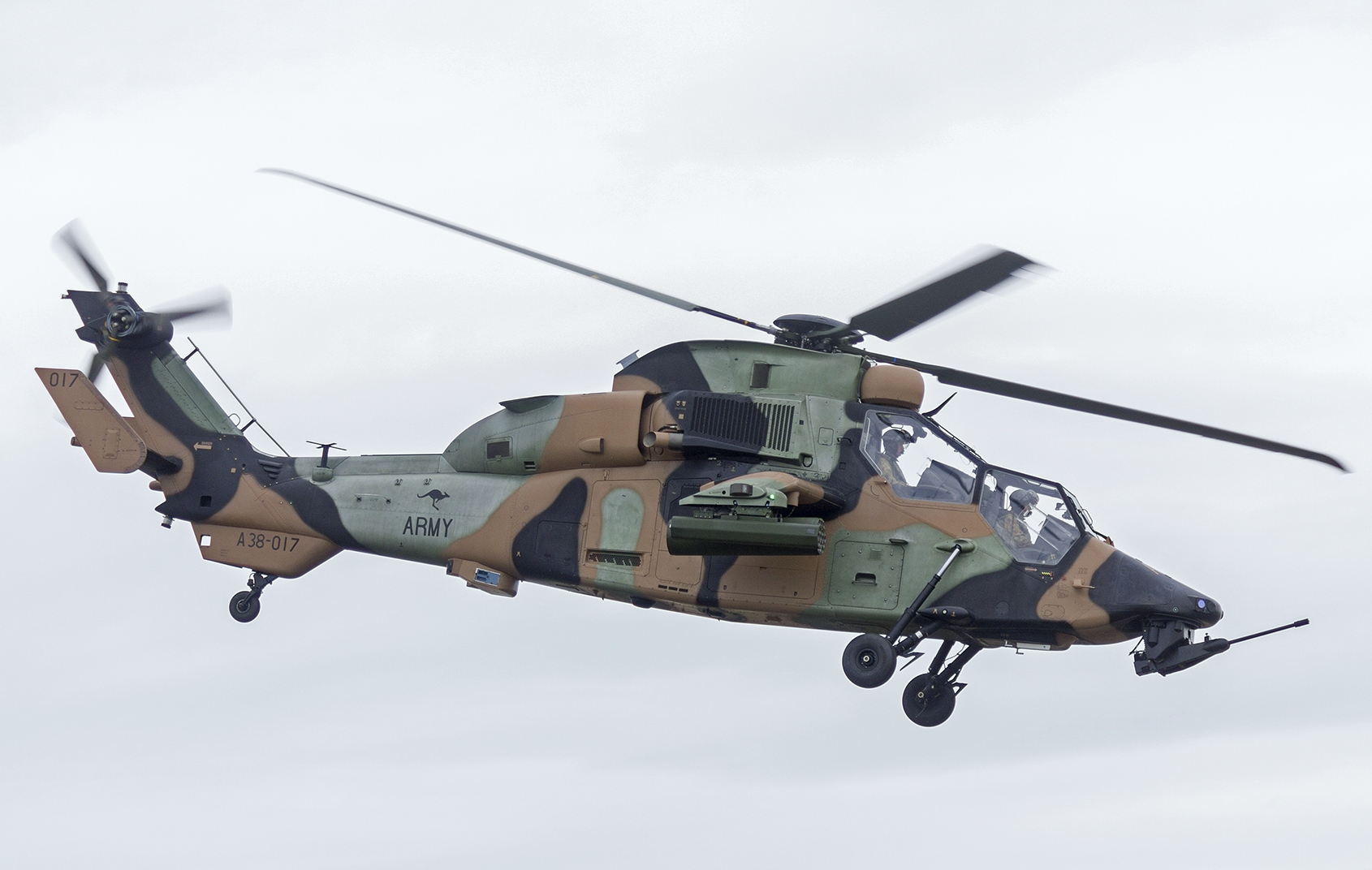
Tiger ARH

The Tiger ARH (Armed Reconnaissance Helicopter) was the version ordered by the Australian Army to replace its OH-58 Kiowas and UH-1 Iroquois-based 'Bushranger' gunships. The Tiger ARH is a modified and upgraded version of the Tiger HAP with upgraded MTR390 engines as well as a laser designator incorporated in the Strix sight for the firing of Hellfire II air-to-ground missiles. Instead of SNEB unguided rockets, the ARH used 70 mm (2.75 in) rockets from Belgian developer, FZ. Twenty-two of the variant were ordered in December 2001. Most of the helicopters were operated by the 1st Aviation Regiment based at Robertson Barracks in Darwin. The helicopter was shipped to Australia in part form and locally assembled at Brisbane Airport by Australia Aerospace.

The first two ARH helicopters were delivered to Australia on 15 December 2004. ARH deliveries were to be completed by June 2010 with Full operating capability planned for December 2011.

In 2012 after three incidents with cockpit fumes that endangered aircrew, pilots voted to not fly until all safety concerns were addressed.

In August 2014, the Australian Defence Force and BAE Systems Australia successfully trialled the Advanced Precision Kill Weapon System laser guidance kit for use with the ARH's 70mm FZ unguided rockets.

The 2016 Australian Defence White Paper stated that the Tiger helicopters would be replaced with other armed reconnaissance aircraft in the mid 2020s. Issues cited include lack of commonality with the other Tiger variants, high maintenance cost of the engines and the shipping time of sending parts to Europe for repair and reconditioning.

The Australian Army's Tiger ARHs reached their final operating capability on 18 April 2016. In April 2019, the Australian Army renewed Airbus Helicopters' maintenance contract for a further 5 years running through to 2025}}

In July 2019, Australia's Capability, Acquisition and Sustainment Group (CASG) issued a request for information to replace their Tiger helicopters. This request surprised many experts, as the issues mentioned in the 2016 White Paper appeared to have been mostly resolved. The Australian Minister for Defence rejected an offer by Airbus to upgrade the in-service Tigers.

In January 2021, the Australian Government announced that it would purchase 29 AH-64E Apache Guardians to replace the Tigers.

In June 2024, the Ukrainian Government expressed interest in acquiring Australia's fleet of Tigers. In December 2025, it was reported that the Australian government is in discussions with the Ukrainian government to gift the Tiger fleet to Ukraine.

In April 2026, the Australian Government announced that it would withdraw the Tigers from service by the end of 2026 a year earlier then previously planned.

On 30 September 2026, the Australian Army retired the Tiger ARH from service.

=== Upgrades ===
In January 2016, it was announced that France was working with Australia, Germany, and Spain to define a proposed further upgrade to its Tiger fleet, referred to as Mk III upgrade. A key aspect of this upgrade, being scheduled to take place around 2023, is to be the adoption of a common anti-tank missile, as well as further improvements to the communication system.

In March 2022, Airbus announced that it had reached agreement with France and Spain to proceed with the Mk III programme, 42 French helicopters will be upgraded with deliveries beginning 2029 and 18 Spanish beginning 2030, the prototype Mk III is expected to first fly in 2025}} Each country's Mk III will be slightly different reflecting national requirements, the upgrades include improvements to the mast-mounted electro-optical system; the helmet-mounted sight system; the enhanced vision system; radios; datalinks for manned-unmanned teaming; new air-to-surface and air-to-air missiles, guns, and rockets; improved countermeasures; a new navigation system synchronised to the Galileo satellite navigation system; as well as an updated avionics suite that includes a new tactical data management system and battlefield management system.

The Mk III will replace the Hellfire II missile with the MAST-F (Missile Air-Sol Tactique Futur).

== Operators ==
=== Current operators ===
France

- French Army
  - 1st Combat Helicopter Regiment
  - 4th Special Forces Helicopter Regiment
  - 5th Combat Helicopter Regiment

Germany

- German Army
  - Army Aviation Helicopter Regiment 36 – will be taken out of operational service by 2032.

Spain

- Spanish Army
  - Attack Helicopter Battalion 1

=== Former operators ===
Australia

- Australian Army
  - 1st Aviation Regiment – all aircraft retired as 30 September 2026.

== Specifications (Tiger HAD) ==
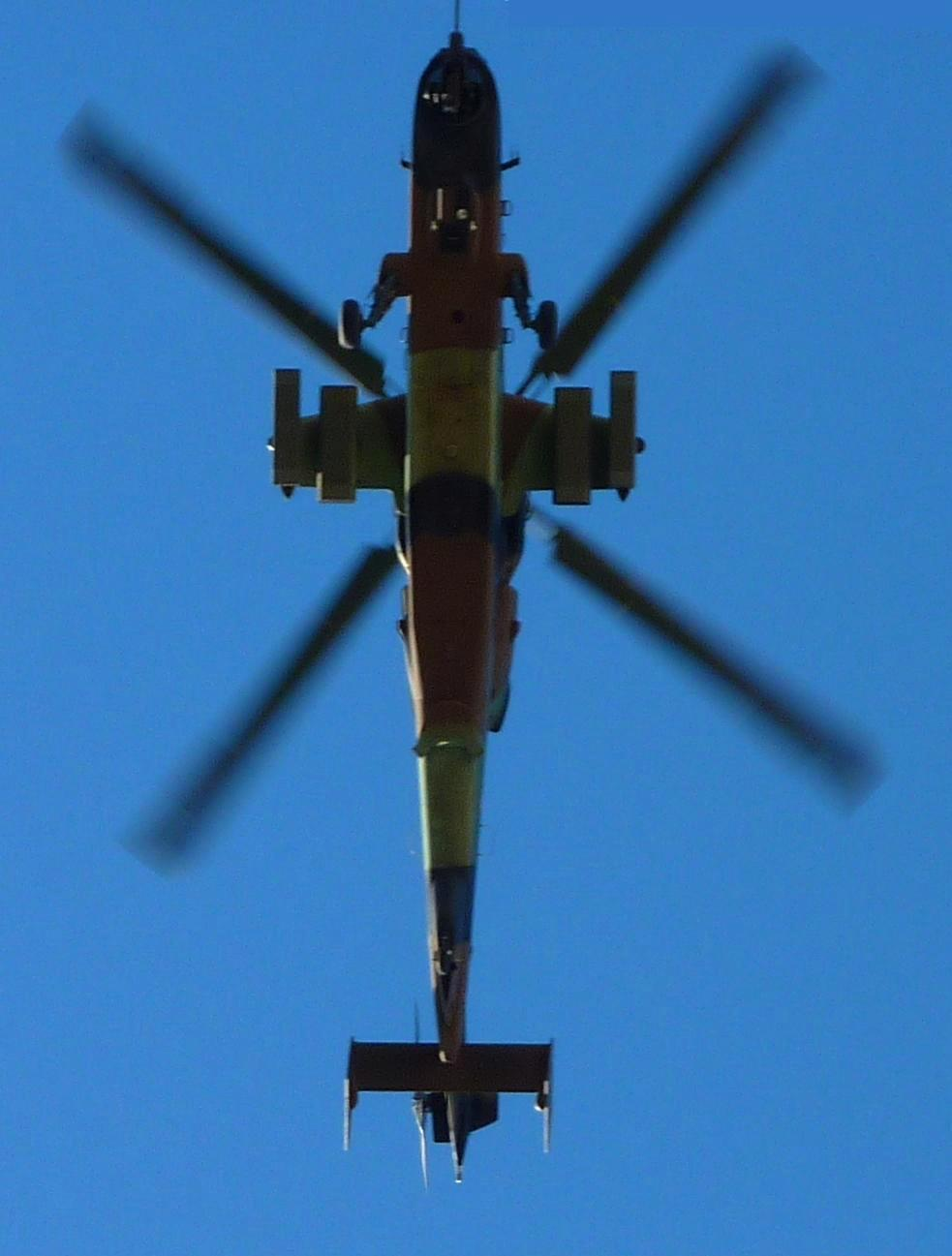
A Tiger flying directly overhead

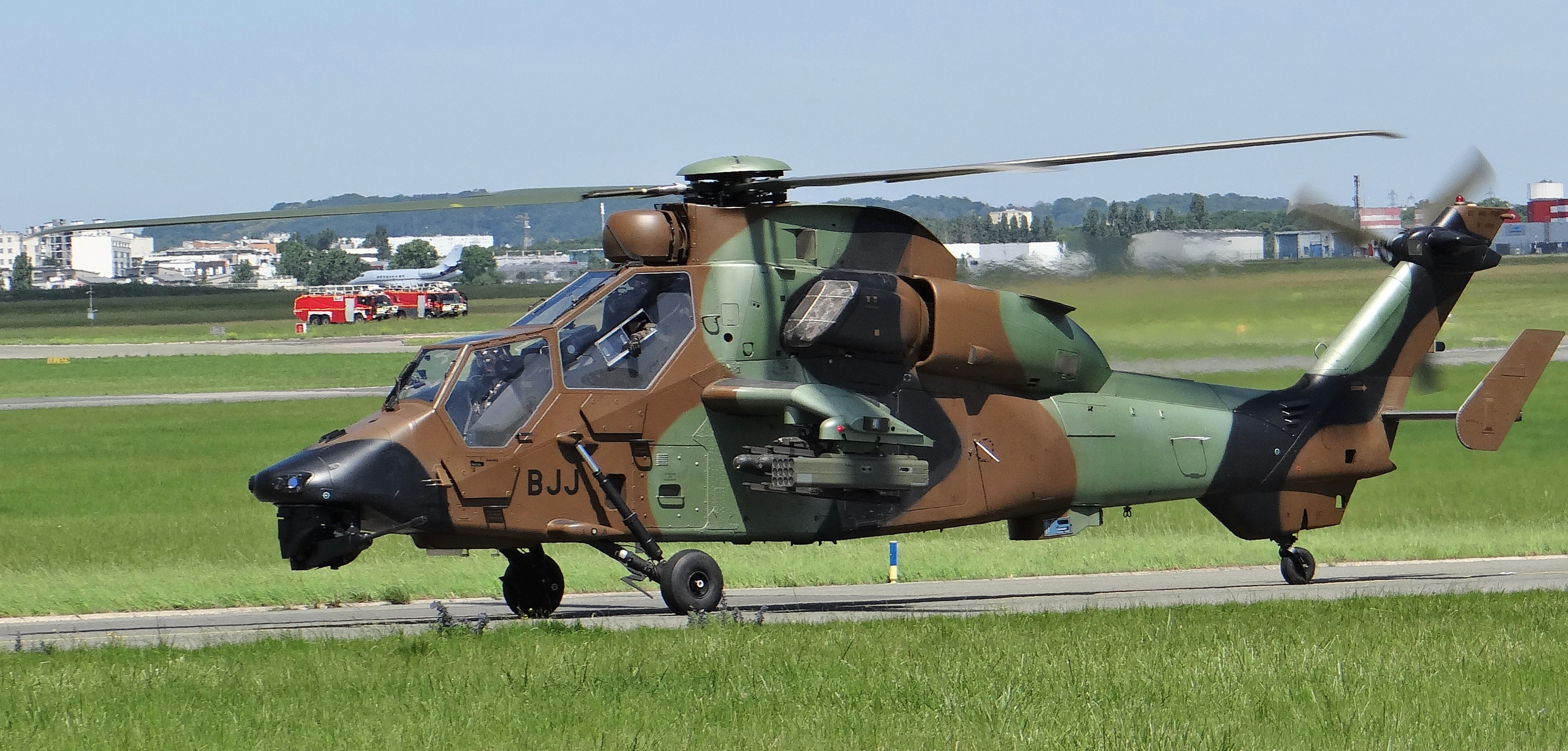
Tiger at Paris Air Show, 2019

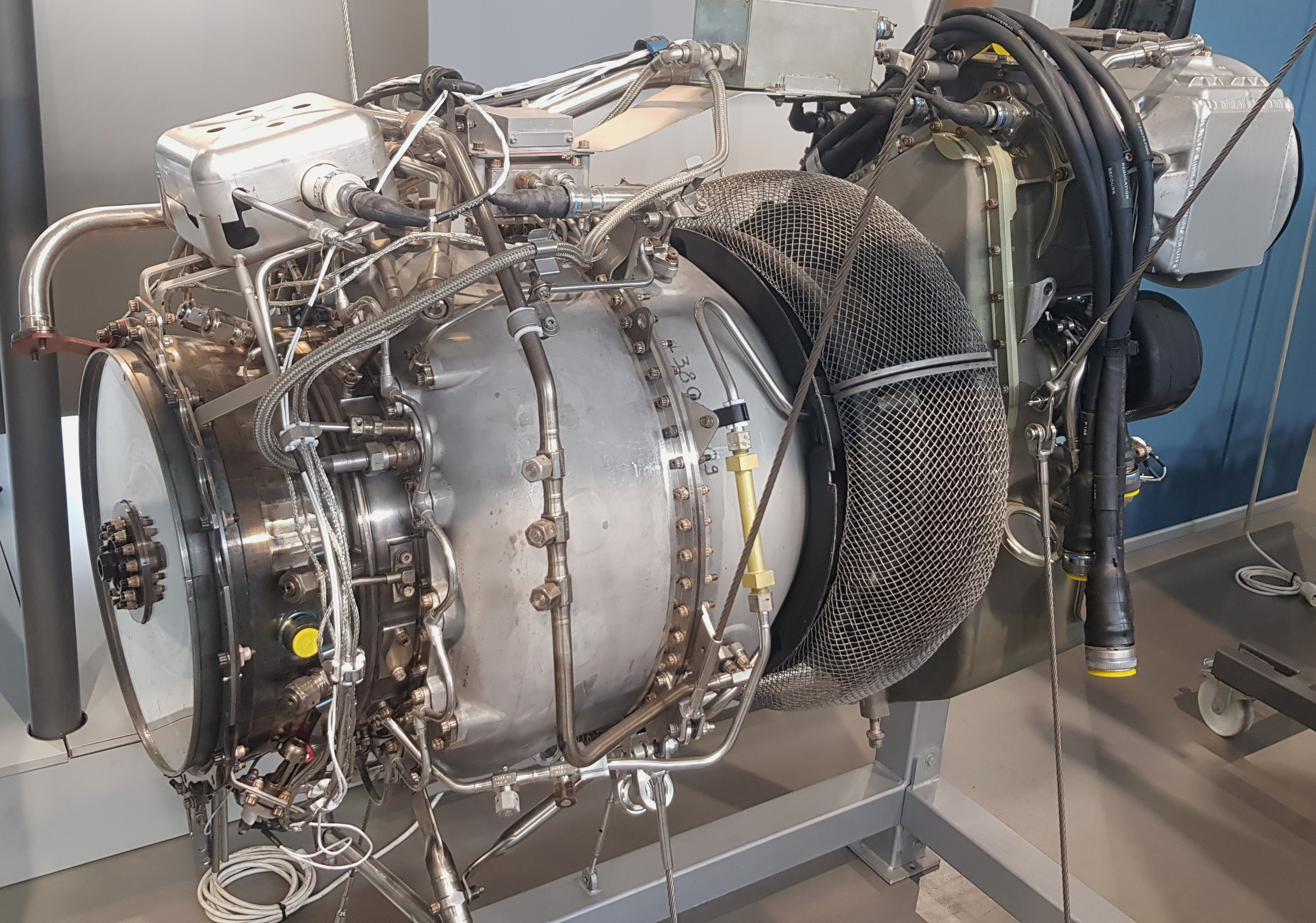
MTU-MTR-390 engine

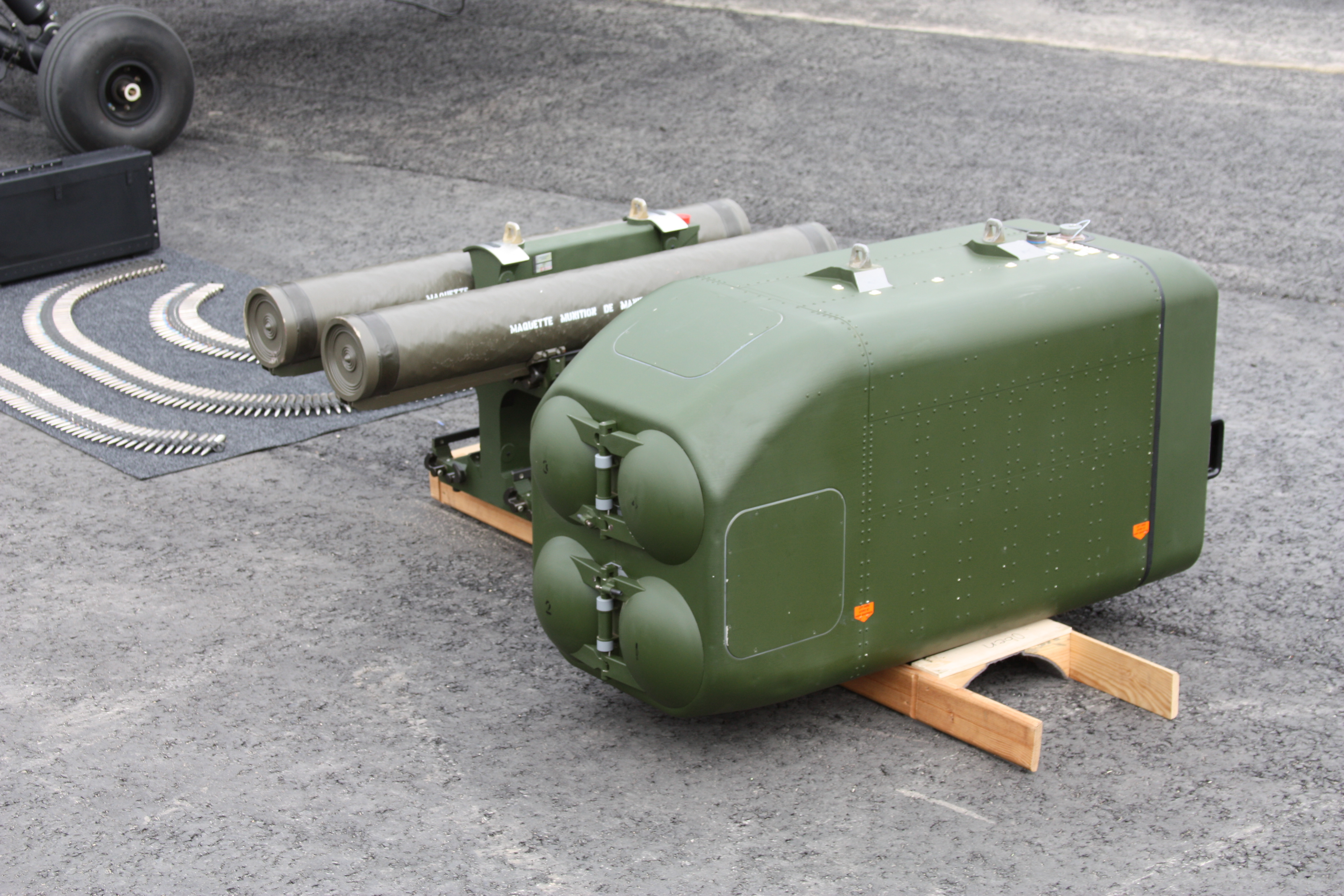
PARS 3 LR and HOT 3 missiles for the Tiger PAH-2

External videos
- Eurocopter Tiger promotional video
- Eurocopter Tiger Air Display at ILA Berlin Air Show 2012
- French Tiger firing rockets in Mali

Data from Airbus, Wilson, McGowen

General characteristics

- Crew: 2 (pilot and weapon systems officer)
- Length: 13.85 m (45 ft 5 in) fuselage (nose to tail)
- Height: 3.84 m (12 ft 7 in) without top-mounted sensors
- Airfoil: blade root: DFVLR DM-H3; blade tip:DFVLR DM-H4
- Empty weight: 3,060 kg (6,746 lb)
- Gross weight: 5,090 kg (11,222 lb)
- Max takeoff weight: 6,600 kg (14,551 lb)
- Fuel capacity: 1,105 kg (2,436 lb) internals , 1,689 kg (3,724 lb) with external fuel tanks
- Powerplant: 2 × MTR390-E turboshaft engines, 1,092 kW (1,464 shp) each
- Main rotor diameter: 13 m (42 ft 8 in)
- Main rotor area: 132.75 m^{2} (1,428.9 sq ft)

Performance

- Maximum speed: 290 km/h (180 mph, 160 kn) with rotor head mast

315 km/h (196 mph; 170 kn) without rotor head mast

- Cruise speed: 271 km/h (168 mph, 146 kn) at MTOW SL
- Combat range: 740 km (460 mi, 400 nmi) armed, with standard fuel tanks
- Ferry range: 1,130 km (700 mi, 610 nmi) not armed, with external fuel tanks
- Endurance: 2.5 hours of standard mission duration, 5.0 hours max endurance with external fuel tank
- Service ceiling: 4,000 m (13,000 ft)
- Rate of climb: 10.7 m/s (2,110 ft/min)
- Disk loading: 38.343 kg/m^{2} (7.853 lb/sq ft)
- Power/mass: 0.33 kW/kg (0.20 hp/lb) at MTOW, with MTR390-E

Armament

- Guns:
  - 1 × 30 mm (1.18 in) GIAT 30 cannon in chin turret, with up to 450 rounds

Tiger can carry a combination of the following weapons:

- Inner hardpoints:
  - 2 × 12.7×99mm NATO FN M3P Browning gun pods, or
  - 2 × 20 mm (0.787 in) autocannon pods, or
  - 2 × 22 × 68 mm (2.68 in) SNEB unguided rockets in a pod (France/Spain)
  - 2 × 19 × 70 mm (2.75 in) FZ-225 unguided rockets pods (Germany/Australia), or
  - 2 × 4 AGM-114 Hellfire missiles (Australia/France), or
  - 2 × 4 Spike-ER missiles (Spain), or
  - 2 × 4 PARS 3 LR missiles (Germany), or
  - 2 × 4 HOT-3 missiles (Germany)
- Outer hardpoints:
  - 2 × 2 Mistral air-to-air missiles (France/Spain), or
  - 2 × 2 Air-to-Air Stinger (ATAS) air-to-air missiles (Germany), or
  - 2 × 12 × 68 mm (2.68 in) SNEB unguided rockets in a pod, or
  - 2 × 7 × 70 mm (2.75 in) FZ-233 unguided rockets pods (Germany/Australia)

== See also ==
Aircraft of comparable role, configuration, and era

- Agusta A129 Mangusta
- AgustaWestland Apache
- Bell AH-1 SuperCobra
- Bell AH-1Z Viper
- Boeing AH-64 Apache
- CAIC Z-10
- Denel Rooivalk
- HAL Prachand
- Harbin Z-19
- IAIO Toufan
- Kamov Ka-50
- Kawasaki OH-1
- Mil Mi-24
- Mil Mi-28
- Panha 2091
- TAI/AgustaWestland T129 ATAK
