= Anti-tank helicopter =

Anti-tank helicopter / Anti-armor helicopter
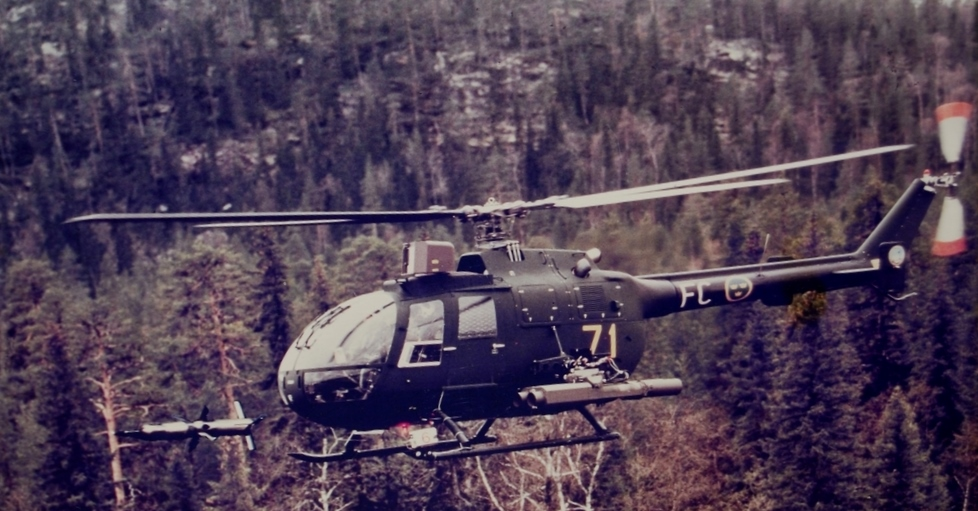
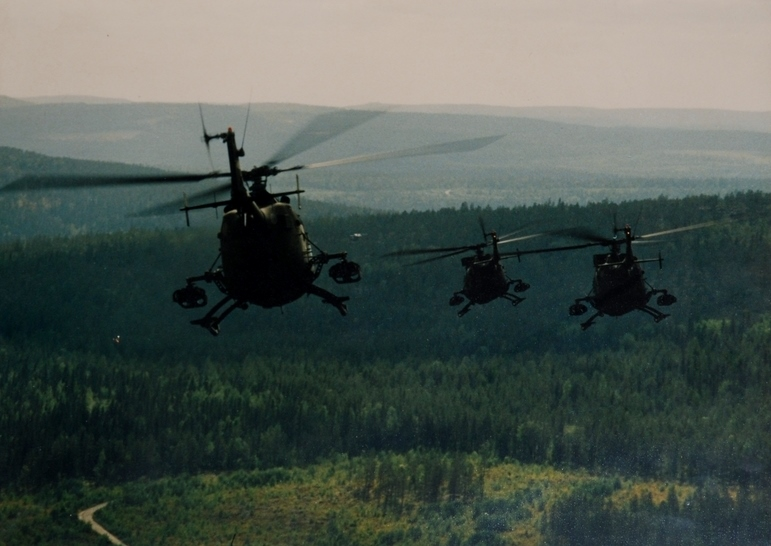
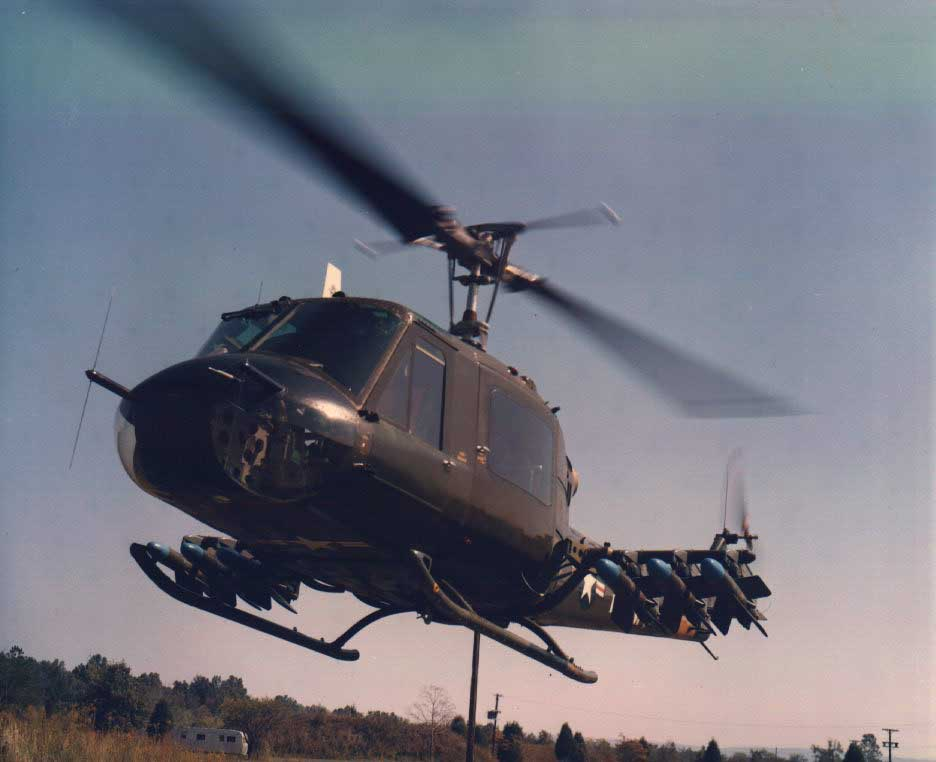
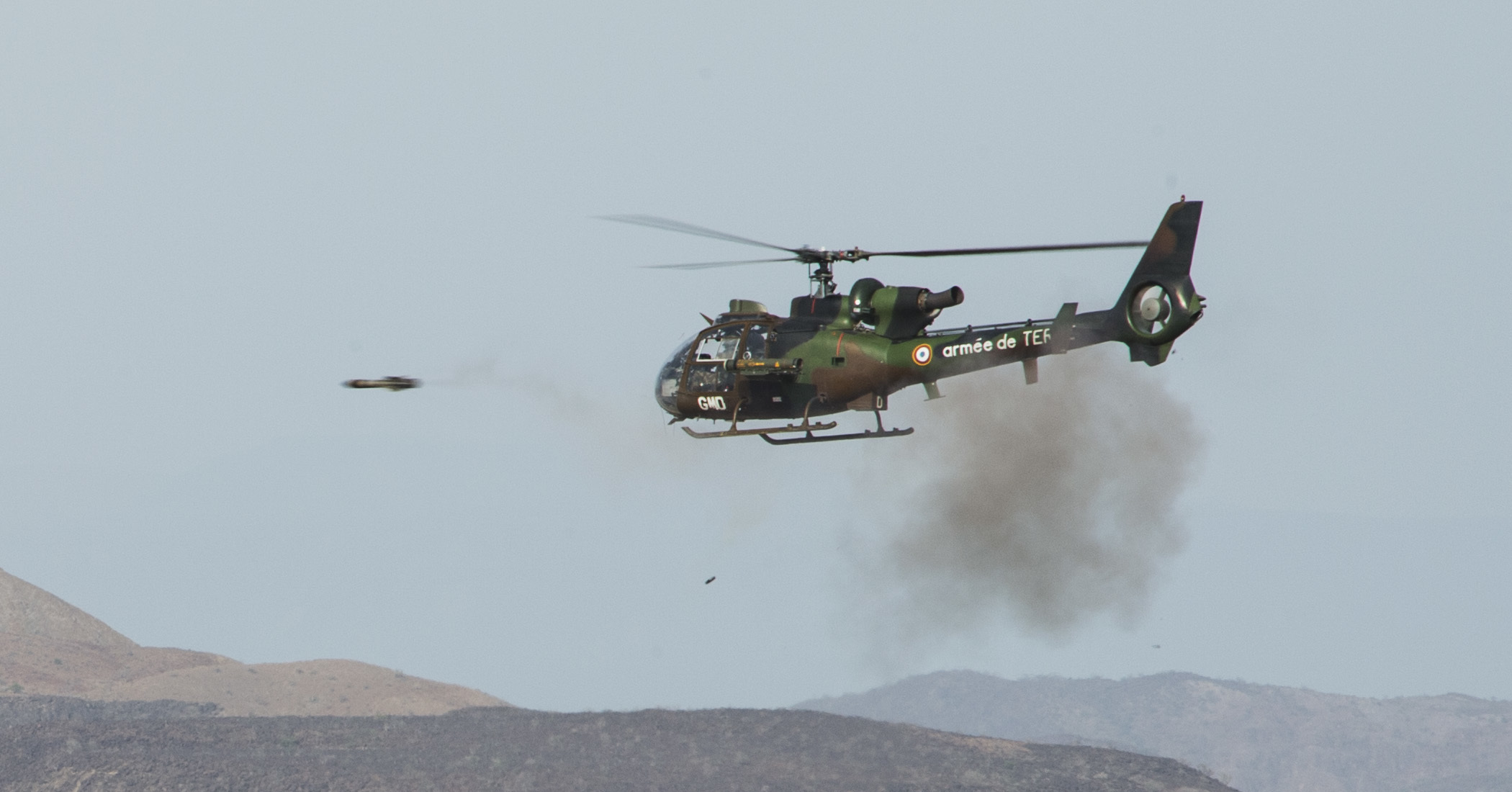
- Top left: Swedish HKP 9A (MBB Bo 105) anti-tank helicopter with Saab-Emerson HeliTOW TOW-based ATH-system
- Top right: Swedish HKP 9A (MBB Bo 105) anti-tank helicopter squad during movement
- Lower left: American UH-1B Huey anti-tank helicopter with AGM-22 ATGM:s
- Lower right: French Aérospatiale Gazelle SA 342 M firing a HOT missile

Anti-tank helicopter (ATH), or anti-armor helicopter, is a type of armed helicopter, predominantly intended for anti-tank duties.

== Description ==
Dedicated anti-tank helicopters are usually outfitted with an anti-tank guided missile (ATGM)-system with an integrated optronic targeting system. While such helicopters may be equipped with radar warning receivers (RWR), electronic countermeasures (CM), or other warning and protection systems, etc., they mainly avoid danger through evasive doctrine. The targeting system is often a roof-mounted sight (RMS / roof sight), or mast-mounted sight (MMS / mast sight) above the rotor, which allows the helicopter to scout targets largely from behind cover, while the ATGM:s allow the helicopters to engage targets at ranges beyond small arms fire, and with the margin needed for evasive action against long range weapons.

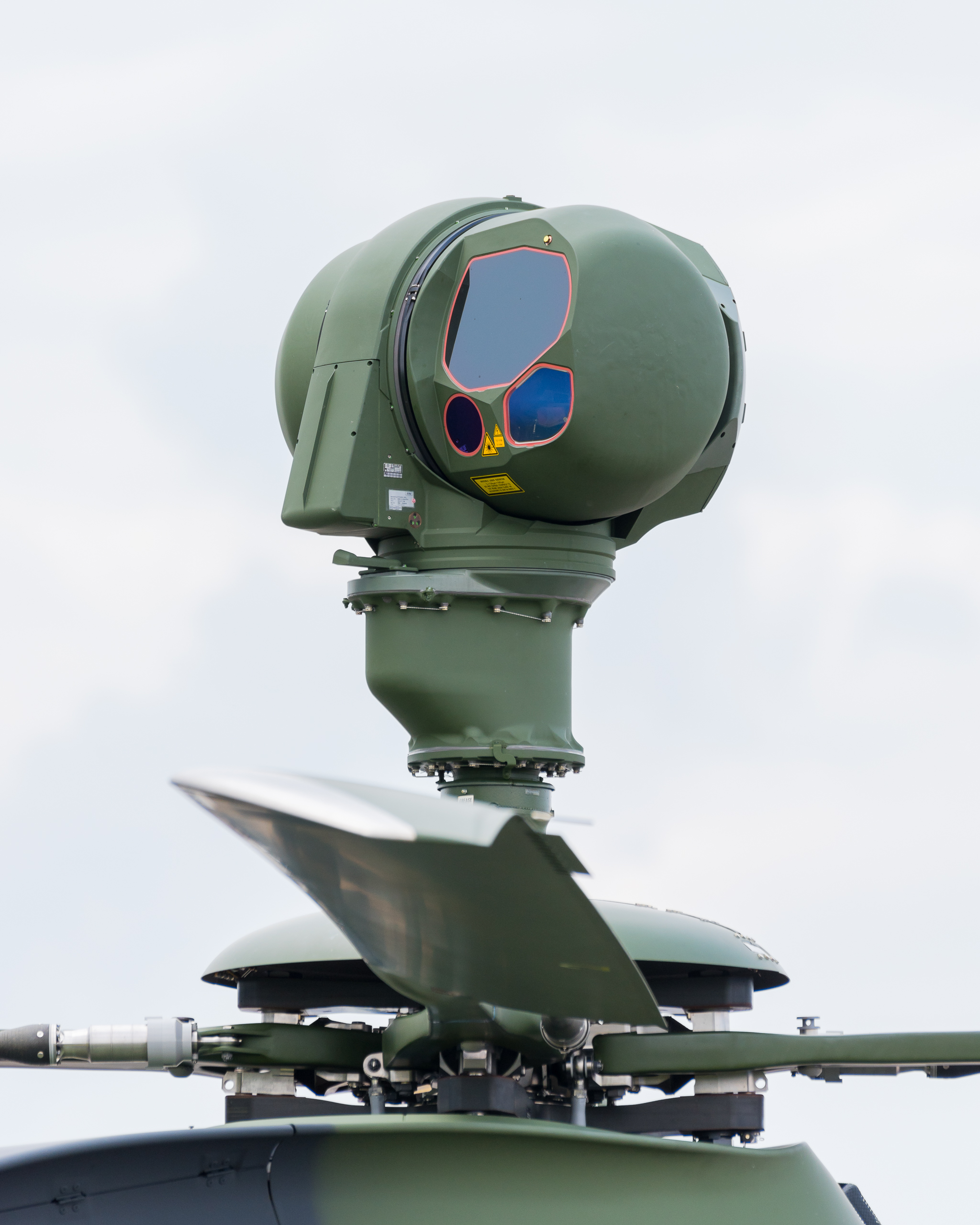
SFIM Osiris mast-mounted sight (MMS) on a Eurocopter Tiger

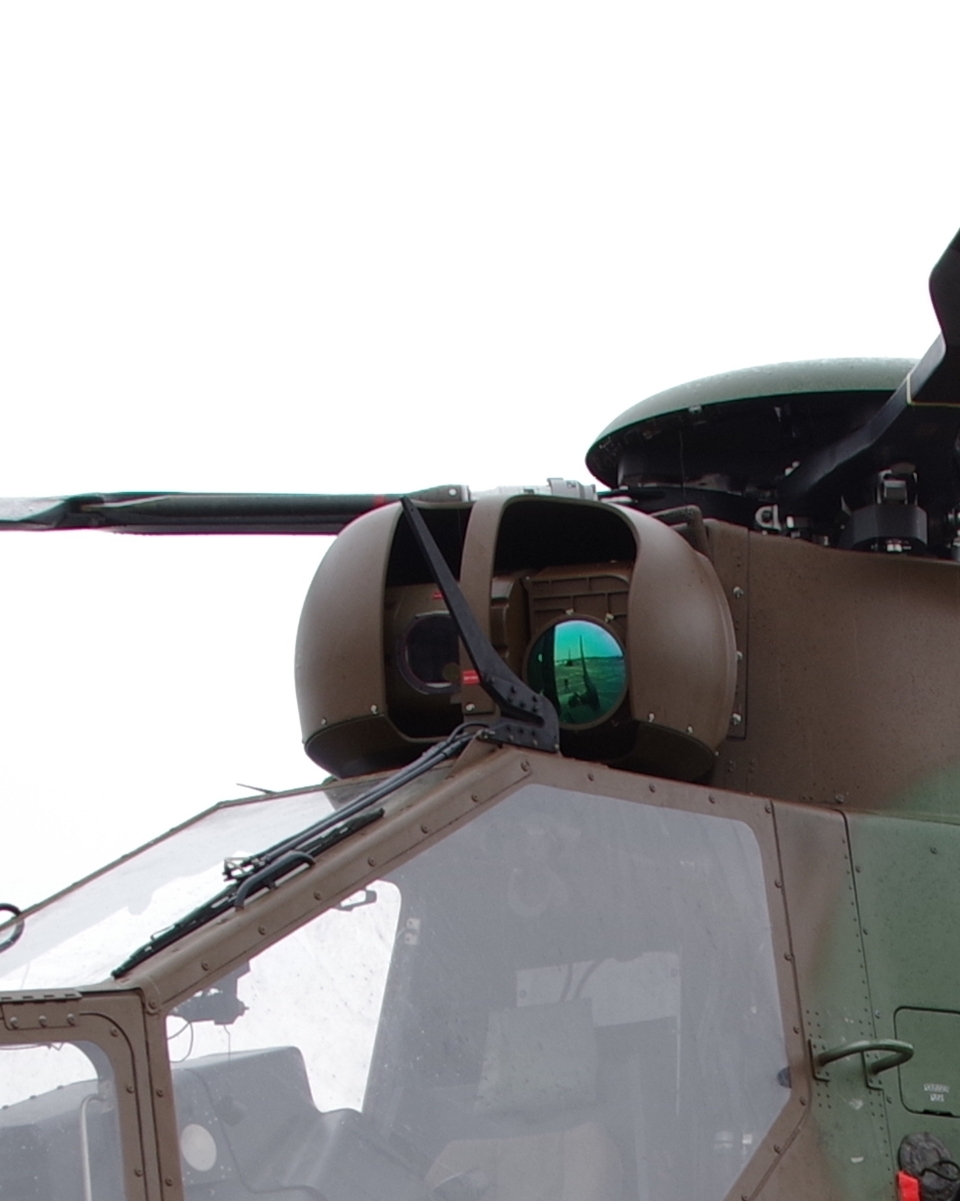
SFIM Strix roof-mounted sight (RMS) on a Eurocopter Tiger

Anti-tank helicopters are often cheap and readily available scout or utility helicopters, outfitted with anti-tank systems, as opposed to more expensive multi-purpose attack helicopters, culminating in a more cost-effective solution to aerial anti-armor duties. Attack helicopters are also used as anti-tank helicopters periodically, but there are also dedicated anti-tank versions of certain attack helicopter models. The Eurocopter Tiger attack helicopter has a dedicated anti-tank version equipped with a mast-mounted sight, in French designated Tiger HAC (Hélicoptère Anti-Char, "anti-tank helicopter"), in German originally designated PAH-2 (Panzerabwehrhubschrauber 2, "anti-armor helicopter 2").

== Anti-tank helicopters after country ==
Country	Designation	Abbreviation	Helicopter	Sighting system	Weapon system	Notes	Image
Belgium	A109BA	–	Agusta A109	HeliTOW (FLIR variant)	4 × HeliTOW-launchers (8 × TOW)	Belgium Air Force	
Denmark	AS 550 C2	–	Eurocopter Fennec AS 550 C2	HeliTOW (day variant)	2 × HeliTOW-launchers (4 × TOW)	Danish Army Air Corps	
France	SA.313B	–	Aérospatiale Alouette II SA 313 B	–	4 × Nord AS.11	French Army Air Corps	
France	SA.316B	–	Aérospatiale Alouette III SA 316 B	APX-Bézu 260	4 × Nord AS.11	French Army Air Corps	
France	SA.3164 Alouette-Canon	–	Aérospatiale Alouette III SA 3164	APX-Bézu 260	4 × Nord AS.11	Export	
France	SA.341F	–	Aérospatiale Gazelle SA 341 F	APX-Bézu 334	2 × HOT-1; 2 × HOT-2	French Army Air Corps	
France	SA.342M	–	Aérospatiale Gazelle SA 342 M	Bendix-SFIM APX M 397	4 × HOT-1; 4 × HOT-2	French Army Air Corps	
France	SA.342M1	–	Aérospatiale Gazelle SA 342 M	Viviane	4 × HOT-2; 4 × HOT-3	French Army Air Corps	
France	SA.365	–	Aérospatiale SA-365 Dauphin/Panther	Bendix-SFIM APX M 397 / Viviane	4 × HOT-2; 4 × M65 TOW-launchers (8 × TOW)	Export	
France	Tiger Hélicoptère Anti-Char	Tiger HAC	Eurocopter Tiger EC-665 HAC	Osiris	2 × HOT-3 twin-launchers (4 × HOT-3); 8 × HOT-3; 8 × AC 3G TRIGAT-LR	French Army Air Corps	
Germany	SA.313B	–	Aérospatiale Alouette II SA 313 B	–	4 × Nord AS.11	Bundeswehr	
Germany	Panzerabwehrhubschrauber 1	PAH-1	MBB Bo 105	Bendix-SFIM APX M 397	6 × HOT-1	Bundeswehr	
Germany	Panzerabwehrhubschrauber 1 A1	PAH-1A1	MBB Bo 105	Bendix-SFIM APX M 397	6 × HOT-2	Bundeswehr	
Germany	Panzerabwehrhubschrauber 1 A2	PAH-1A2	MBB Bo 105	Pietzsch Automatisierungstechnik ELVIS	6 × HOT-2; 6 × HOT-3	Prototype	
Germany	Panzerabwehrhubschrauber 2	PAH-2	Eurocopter Tiger EC-665 UHT/KHT	Osiris	8 × HOT-3; 8 × PARS 3 LR	Bundeswehr	
Germany	Bo 105 Panzerabwehrhubschrauber	Bo 105 PAH / Bo 105 P	MBB Bo 105 CB	Bendix-SFIM APX M 397	6 × HOT-1	Export	
Germany	Bo 105 TOW	-	MBB Bo 105 CB	Hughes/British Aerospace TOW roof sight	4 × M65 TOW-launchers (8 × TOW)	Export	
Germany	BK 117 A-3M	-	MBB/Kawasaki BK 117 A-3M	Bendix-SFIM APX M 397 roof sight + Hughes/British Aerospace TOW mast sight	4 × M65 TOW-launchers (8 × TOW)	Export	
Italy	A 109A	–	Agusta A 109A	SFIM APX M 397	2 × M65 TOW-launchers (4 × TOW)	Export	
North Korea	*H-500E	–	Hughes 500E	–	4 × AT-3 Sagger clones	North Korean Army	
Romania	IAR-316B	–	Aérospatiale Alouette III	–	6 × Malyutka	Romanian Army	
Romania	IAR-317 Skyfox	–	Aérospatiale Alouette III	–	6 × Malyutka	Prototype	
Saudi Arabia	AH-6 Little Bird	–	McDonnell Douglas 530	chin-mounted sight	4 × TOW; 4 × Hellfire	Saudi Arabian Army	
Saudi Arabia	MH-58D Combat Scout	–	Bell 406CS Combat Scout	HeliTOW	2 × HeliTOW-launchers (4 × TOW)	Saudi Arabian Army	
South Korea	500MD Defender	–	McDonnell Douglas 500 Defender	nose-mounted sight	4 × TOW	South Korean Army	
South Korea	520MK Black Tiger	–	McDonnell Douglas 520MK Black Tiger	chin-mounted sight	4 × TOW; 4 × Hellfire	South Korean Army	
South Korea	LAH-1 Miron	–	KAI LAH-1 Miron	nose-mounted sight	4 × TAipers	South Korean Army	
Sweden	pansarvärnshelikopter 3A	pvhkp 3A	Agusta-Bell 204/205	reflector sight	6 × robot 53 Bantam	demonstrator 1966	
Sweden	pansarvärnshelikopter 9A	pvhkp 9A	MBB Bo 105 CBS	HeliTOW (day variant)	2 × HeliTOW-launchers (4 × TOW)	Swedish Army Air Corps	
UK	Scout AH.1	–	Westland Scout	–	4 × Nord AS.11	British Army Air Corps	
UK	Lynx AH.1 (TOW)	–	Westland Lynx	Hughes/British Aerospace TOW roof sight	4 × M65 TOW-launchers (8 × TOW); 8 × Hellfire	British Army Air Corps	
USA	UH-1B Iroquois	–	Bell UH-1 Iroquois	–	6 × AGM-22 ATGM:s	US Army	
USA	UH-1C Iroquois	–	Bell UH-1 Iroquois	–	6 × AGM-22 ATGM:s; 6 × TOW	US Army	
USA	MH-6 Little Bird	–	McDonnell Douglas 530	chin-mounted sight	4 × TOW; 4 × Hellfire	US Army	
USA	AH-6 Little Bird	–	McDonnell Douglas 530	chin-mounted sight	4 × TOW; 4 × Hellfire	US Army	
USA	OH-58D Kiowa Warrior	KW	Bell 406	mast-mounted sight	4 × M65 TOW-launchers (8 × TOW); 4 × Hellfire	US Army	
USA	AH-58D Kiowa Warrior	KW	Bell 406	mast-mounted sight	4 × M65 TOW-launchers (8 × TOW); 4 × Hellfire	Task Force 118 (4th Squadron, 17th Cavalry)	
USA	Texas Ranger	–	Bell 206L Texas Ranger	Hughes/British Aerospace TOW roof sight	2 × M65 TOW-launchers (4 × TOW)	Export	
USA	Hughes 500MD/TOW Defender	–	McDonnell Douglas MD 500 Defender	nose-mounted sight	4 × TOW	Export	
USA	Hughes 500MD/MMS-TOW Defender	–	McDonnell Douglas MD 500 Defender	Hughes/British Aerospace TOW roof sight	4 × TOW	Export	

== Anti-tank helicopter sighting systems ==
- France APX-Bézu 260 – day sight
- France APX-Bézu 334 – day sight
- France Bendix-SFIM APX M 344 – day sight
- France Bendix-SFIM APX M 397 – day sight for Euromissile HOT
- France SFIM Viviane – day/night thermal sight for Euromissile HOT
- France SFIM/TRT Strix – gyro-stabilised roof-mounted infrared sight with CCD TV (charge coupled device television camera), laser rangefinder and direct

optical sight

- France SFIM/Euromep Osiris (Optical Stabilised InfraRed Integrated System) – mast-mounted sight with an IRCCD-camera (infrared charge coupled device) and laser rangefinder
- Germany Pietzsch Automatisierungstechnik ELVIS – helicopter thermal imaging sight
- Sweden Saab-Scania Helios (1976) – gyro-stabilized sight with target marking video camera; could be integrated with (among others): BGM-71 TOW and RBS 70
- Sweden Saab-Emerson HeliTOW (1980) – gyro-stabilized sight with laser range finder, optional night vision/FLIR, CCD sensors; designed for BGM-71 TOW
- USA/UK Hughes/British Aerospace TOW roof sight (1981) – helicopter roof sight for the BGM-71 TOW; nightvision introduced in 1988

== See also ==
- Armed helicopter
- Attack helicopter
- Helicopter gunship
- Military helicopter
