= Europrop =

Europrop can refer to:

- Europrop TP400, a military turboprop engine
- Europrop International, makers of the Europrop TP400
