= Aero Propulsion Alliance =

Aero Propulsion Alliance was a European aeroengine consortium set up to develop the TP400-D1 turboprop for the Airbus A400M military transport aircraft, using a modified Snecma M88 high pressure spool as the gas generator. Early studies adopted a two shaft design with a shared-load power turbine, but a three-shaft configuration, with a free power turbine, was later adopted. However, Airbus considered the specific fuel consumption (SFC) of the TP400-D1 uncompetitive, so a new consortium (Europrop International) was formed to develop the Europrop TP400-D6, with an all-new gas generator.
