= Safran Aircraft Engines =

Aircraft and rocket engine manufacturer based in France

- Formerly: Snecma
- Type: Subsidiary
- Industry: Aerospace; Defence
- Founded: 1945; 81 years ago
- Headquarters: Courcouronnes, France
- Key people: Stéphane Cueille (CEO)
- Products: Aircraft engines Rocket engines
- Revenue: ▲€11.88 billion (2023)
- Operating income: ▲€2.39 billion (2023)
- Number of employees: 15,700 (2016)
- Parent: Safran
- Website: safran-aircraft-engines.com

Safran Aircraft Engines, previously Snecma (Société nationale d'études et de construction de moteurs d'aviation) or Snecma Moteurs, is a French aerospace engine manufacturer headquartered in Courcouronnes and a subsidiary of Safran. It designs, manufactures and maintains engines for commercial and military aircraft as well as rocket engines for launch vehicles and satellites.

Some of its notable developments, alone or in partnership, include the Dassault Rafale's M88 engine, the Concorde's Olympus 593, the CFM56 and CFM-LEAP for single-aisle airliners, as well as the Ariane 5's Vulcain engine.

The company employs around 15,700 people across 35 production sites, offices, and MRO facilities worldwide and files an average of nearly 500 patents each year.

Safran Aircraft Engines also notably operates two joint ventures with GE Aerospace: CFM International, the world's leading supplier of commercial aircraft engines, and CFM Materials.

== Timeline ==
- 1945: Snecma was formed when the French aircraft engine manufacturer Gnome & Rhône was nationalised. The name 'Snecma' was an acronym for Société nationale d'études et de construction de moteurs d'aviation (in English: 'National Company for the Research and Construction of Aviation Engines').
- 1946: Initial employees were German engineers, primarily from BMW, located in Decize, France. Group was known as Groupe "O" until 1950. First design product was the ATAR engine.
- 1946 or 1947, the nationalized Établissments Regnier Motor Company was absorbed into Snecma and continued to produce the SNECMA Régnier 4L.
- 1961: Snecma and Bristol Siddeley formed a joint venture to produce a high-performance jet engine for the Concorde. The main body of the engine came from the Bristol Olympus, which was further improved with several refinements including the addition of the variable intakes necessary for supersonic flight.
- 1968: Snecma acquired Hispano-Suiza, Socata and Bugatti.
- 1970: Messier and Snecma agreed to merge their landing gear business. The following year, Messier-Hispano was formed, which was fully acquired by Snecma in 1973. Snecma's landing gear business was further consolidated by the creation of Messier-Hispano-Bugatti (later renamed Messier-Bugatti) in 1977.
- 1974: Snecma and General Electric (GE) created a joint venture named CFM International, beginning a long term cooperation to produce the CFM56 series of turbofan engines.
- 1990: Snecma announced its partnership with General Electric to build and produce the General Electric GE90 engine.
- 1994: Messier-Dowty was formed following the merger of the landing gear businesses of Snecma (Messier) and the British TI Group (Dowty).
- 1997: Snecma fully acquired the Société européenne de propulsion.
- 1998: Snecma took full control of Messier-Dowty.
- 1999: Snecma Services was created to consolidate all maintenance, repair and overhaul (MRO) operations (including Sochata-Snecma).
- 2000: Snecma acquired Labinal, along with its Turbomeca and Microturbo subsidiaries.
- 2001: Hurel-Hispano (now renamed and known as Safran Nacelles) was created to consolidate the group's engine nacelle and thrust reverser business.
- 2005: Snecma merged with SAGEM to form Safran. Snecma was divided into two divisions of the new group (propulsion and equipment).
- 2010: Snecma and GE formed CFM Materials as a 50/50 joint venture.
- 2016: Snecma was renamed Safran Aircraft Engines as the main subsidiary of Safran.

== Major programmes ==
In terms of volume, the most impactful commercial aero engine produced by Safran Aircraft Engines is the CFM International CFM56 turbofan powerplant. This engine is both developed and manufactured via a 50-50 joint venture company, CFM International, which Safran jointly owns with the American industrial conglomerate General Electric (GE). Established during the 1970s, the CFM56 was not an early success; by April 1979, the joint venture had not received a single order in five years and was allegedly two weeks away from being dissolved. The program was saved when Delta Air Lines, United Airlines, and Flying Tigers chose the CFM56 to re-engine their DC-8s; shortly thereafter, it was also selected to re-engine the KC-135 Stratotanker fleet of the United States Air Force, this operator being the engine's biggest customer. Following this turn of fortune, tens of thousands of engines have since been produced over the decades. A total of 30,000 CFM56s have been completed by July 2016.

Safran Aircraft Engines is also the main partner for several other engines coproduced with GE, including the CF6-80 and GE90. Safran Aircraft Engines is also involved in the Engine Alliance, which manufactures the GP7000 high-thrust turbofan engine, one of the only two powerplants certified to power the twin-decker Airbus A380. During the 2010s, Safran started manufacturing its portion of the LEAP engine via the CFM International joint venture; Safran and GE each assemble half of the annual volume. To cope with high demand for the LEAP engine, CFM has duplicated supply sources for 80% of parts and as well as subdivided assembly sites.

Safran Aircraft Engines is also involved in PowerJet, a joint venture business with Russian aero engine specialist NPO Saturn; this company produces SaM146 turbofan engine, which is used to power the Sukhoi Superjet 100 regional jet. During 2005, a new production plant was founded in Rybinsk, VolgAero, to manufacture components of the SaM146; additionally, parts and assemblies of other engines produced by PowerJet's two parent companies are also produced on this site.

In terms of military engines, Safran Aircraft Engines produces the Snecma M88 turbofan. This engine was developed to power the Dassault Rafale fighter aircraft. It fulfills numerous stringent performance criteria, including a high thrust-to-weight ratio, low fuel consumption across all flight regimes, and a long engine life. Additional considerations were afforded to both the M88's maintainability and upgrade potential (73 kN to 105 kN using the same core). Qualification of the M88-2 engine was completed during 1996 while the first production engine was delivered by the end of that year. It is of a modular design for ease of construction and maintenance, as well as to enable older engines to be retrofitted with improved subsections upon availability, such as existing M88-2s being upgraded to M88-4E standard. In May 2010, a Rafale flew for the first time with the M88-4E engine, an upgraded variant with greater thrust and lower maintenance requirements than the preceding M88-2.

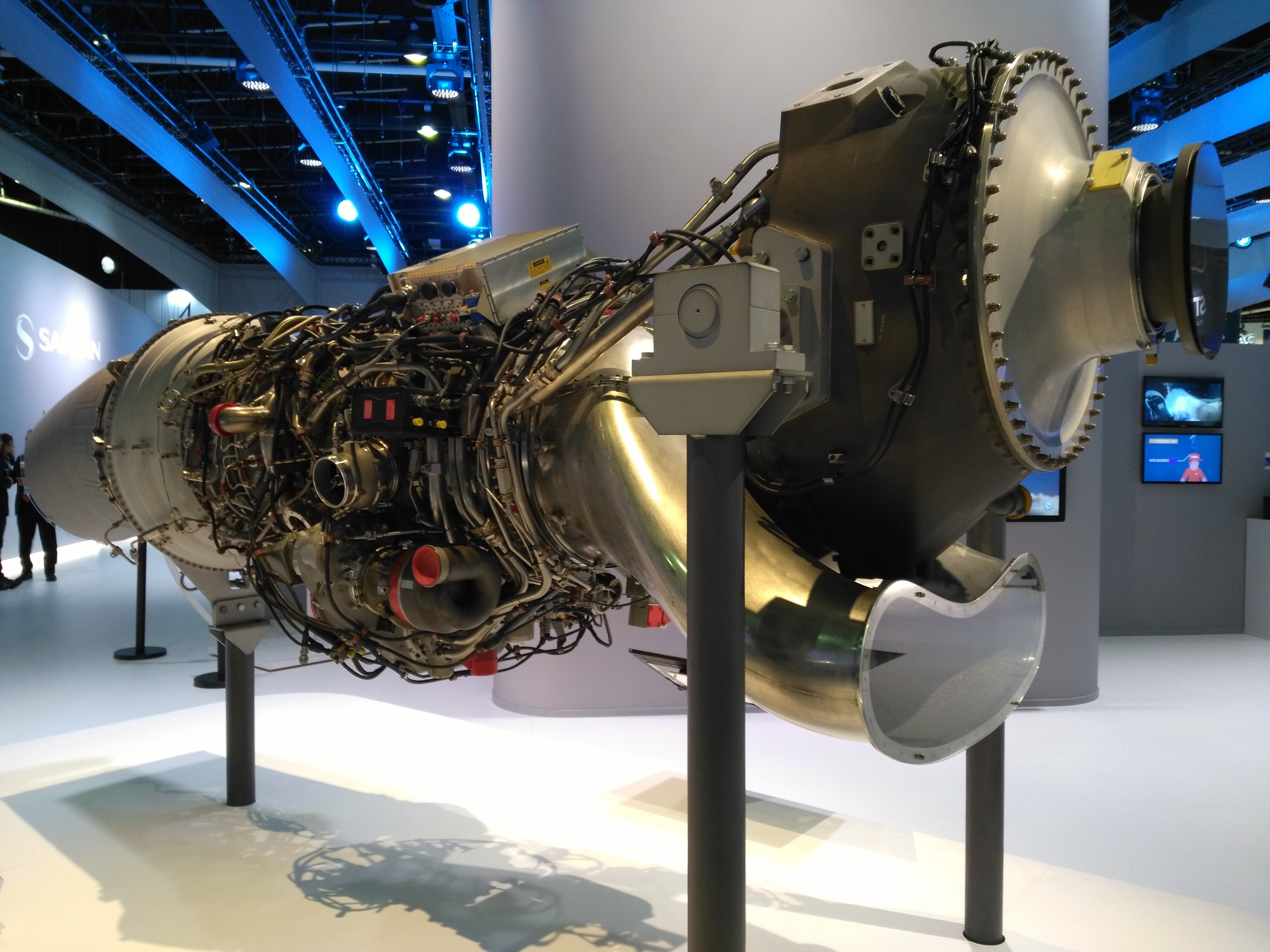
The Europrop TP400 engine on static display at the Paris Air Show, 2017

In 2002, the Europrop International (EPI) consortium was set up by four aero engine manufacturers, Safran Aircraft Engines, Germany's MTU Aero Engines, Britain's Rolls-Royce Holdings and Spain's Industria de Turbo Propulsores. EPI GmbH is tasked with designing, developing, marketing, manufacturing and providing support for the TP400-D6 turboprop engine to power the Airbus A400M Atlas, a military airlifter manufactured by Airbus Defence and Space. The TP400 is the most powerful turboprop in the world currently in production.

open rotor concept

During 2008, the European Commission launched an open rotor demonstration led by Safran within the Clean Sky program with 65 million euros funding over eight years: a demonstrator was assembled in 2015, and ground tested in May 2017 on its open-air test rig in Istres, aiming to reduce fuel consumption and associated CO_{2} emissions by 30% compared with current CFM56 turbofans. With its 30:1 bypass ratio, it should deliver a 15% improvement over the CFM International LEAP already at 11:1; but Airbus is more interested in the more conventional ultra high bypass ratio (UHBR) turbofan at 15:1, which could be introduced from 2025, offering 5% to 10% better efficiency than the LEAP and to be tested from 2020. Built around the M88's core, the fan blades are slower than the 1980s GE36 due to the reduction gear, lowering noise and the fan can be mounted at the engine front for under-wing configurations. The gearbox and the blade variable-pitch technologies were validated in 100 cycles and 70 hours of tests, including 25% at takeoff thrusts of 21,000–25,000 lbf (93–111 kN), reverse thrust, and rotor imbalance with a blade weight. Afterwards, it was disassembled in April 2018 to examine each part and refine expected wear predictions. GE Aviation was involved through its Italian subsidiary Avio Aero, providing the gearbox and the low-pressure turbine.To be certified, a blade-out event has to be extremely improbable, less than once every billion flight hours as its resin-transfer molding (RTM) carbon fiber fan blades will be supported by the in-service LEAP experience.

During December 2019, Safran and MTU announced an agreement to found a 50/50 joint venture to manage the development, production, and after-sales support activities of the new military aero engine intended to power the Future Combat Air System.

In June 2021, Safran presented an updated architecture for its RISE open rotor concept, with a single to 144-156 in (365-396 cm) fan with variable pitch blades forward of a row of static guide vanes, to deliver 30,000lb of thrust (133 kN) with 20% better efficiency than the CFM LEAP.

== Products ==
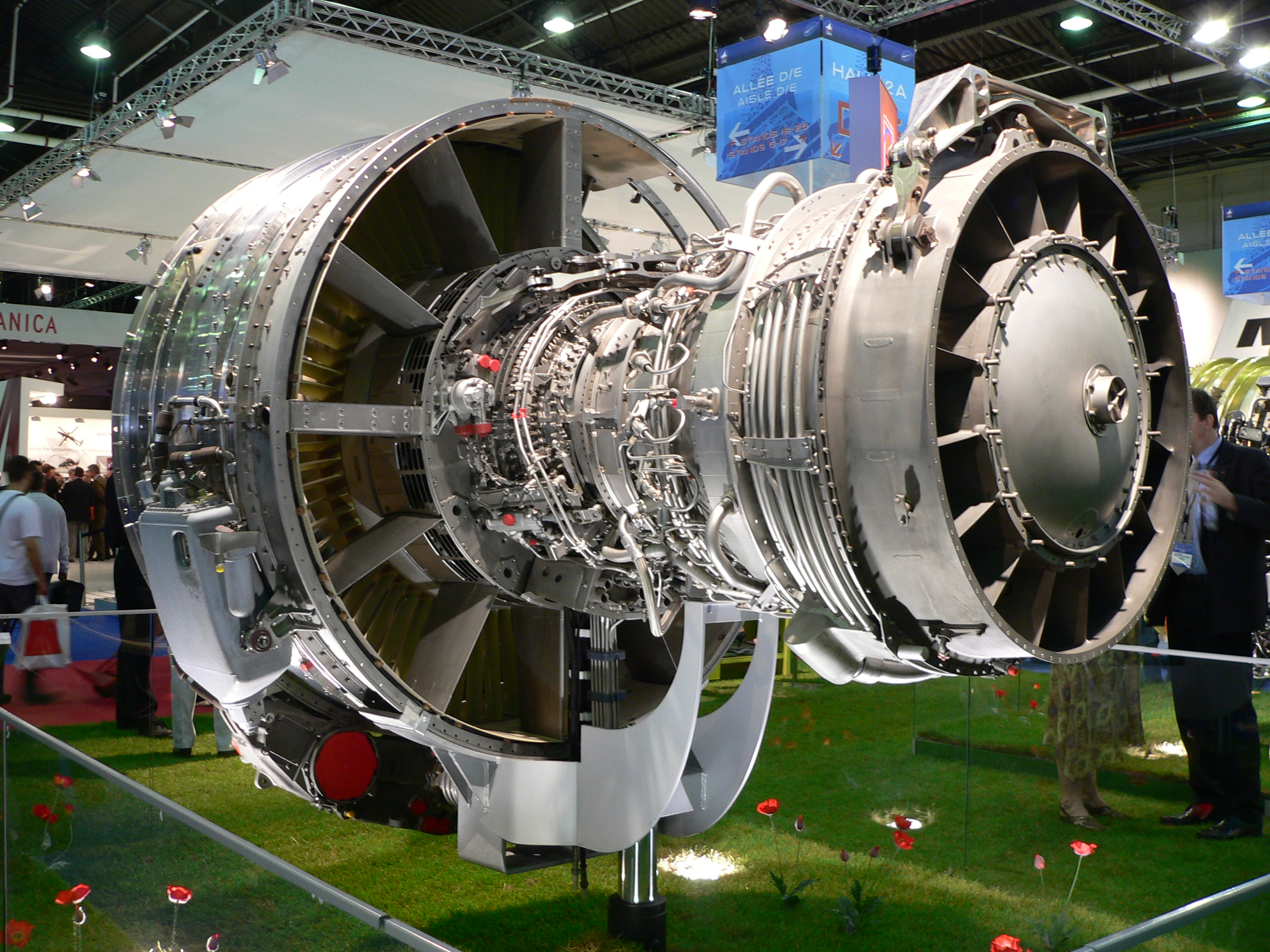
CFM International CFM56 powering several airliners.

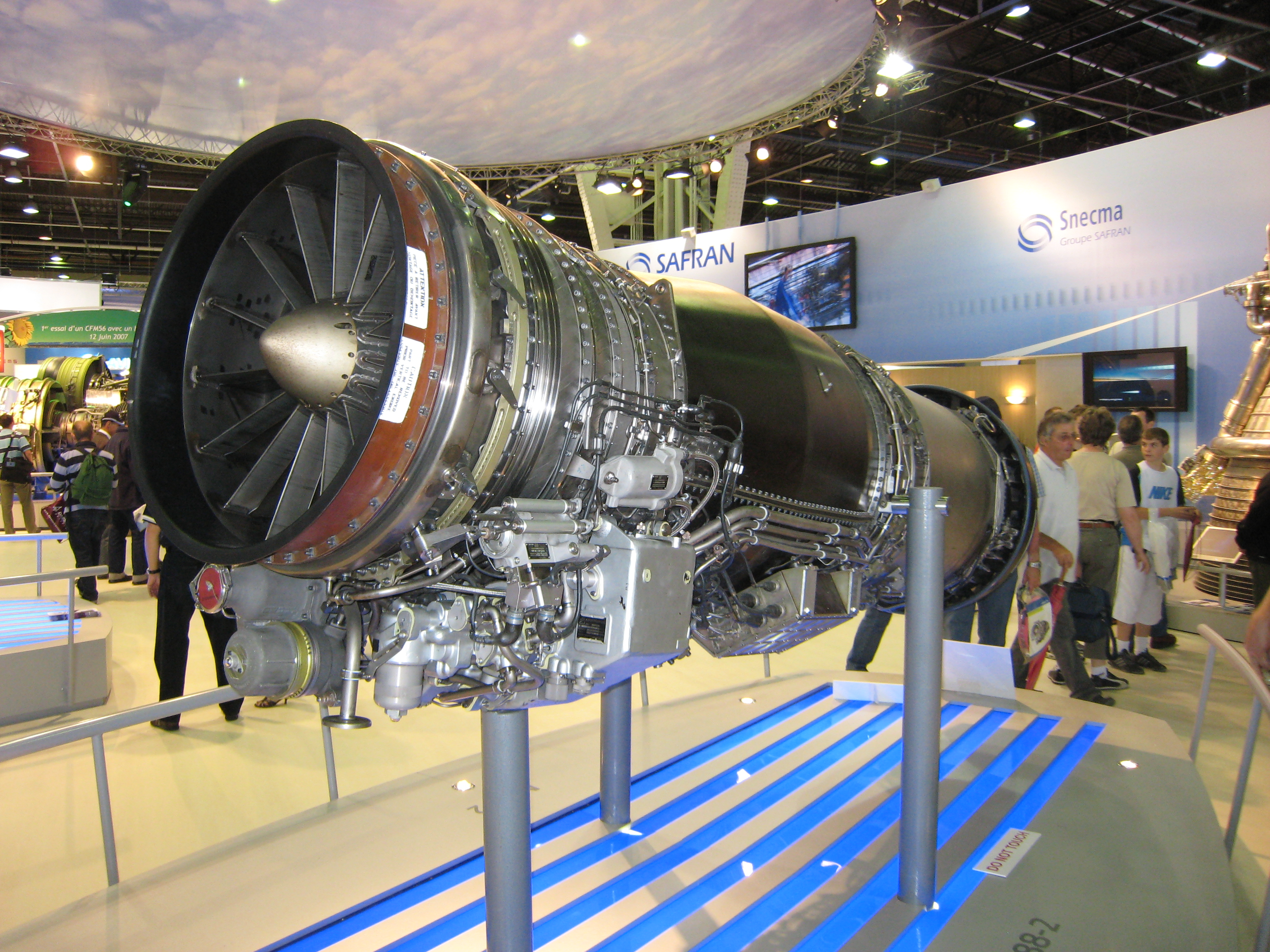
M88 used on the Dassault Rafale.

=== Aircraft ===
- SNECMA Coleoptere

=== Commercial engines ===
Model name	Corporate	Share
CFM International CFM56	CFM International	50%
CFM International LEAP	CFM International	50%
PowerJet SaM146	PowerJet	50%
General Electric GE90	GE Aerospace	23.5%
General Electric CF6	GE Aerospace	10–20%
Engine Alliance GP7000	Engine Alliance	10%
Safran Silvercrest	Safran	(canceled)

=== Military engines ===
==== Turbojets ====
- SNECMA Atar

==== Turbofans ====
- SNECMA M53
- SNECMA M88
- SNECMA Turbomeca Larzac

==== Turboprops ====
- EuroProp TP400-D6 (as part of Europrop International)
- 5,000 shp turboprop 70-90 seater regional airliners (under study)

=== Space engines ===
- Viking
- HM7B
- PPS-1350
- PPS-5000
- Vinci
- Vulcain

== Sites ==
- Châtellerault
- Courcouronnes: Headquarters
- Évry-Corbeil
- Le Creusot
- Gennevilliers
- Guiana Space Centre
- Istres
- Melun Villaroche Aerodrome, located at Montereau-sur-le-Jard
- Saint-Quentin-en-Yvelines
- Vernon
- GMR Aerospace and Industrial Park – SEZ, Rajiv Gandhi International Airport, Hyderabad, India
  - Hosts a 45,000 m^{2} (11 acres) MRO facility of Safran Aircraft Engine Services India for LEAP series engines. The facility, worth ₹1,300 crore (equivalent to ₹13 billion or US$140 million in 2026), can service up to 300 engines annually with a workforce of 1,000 technicians. The facility was inaugurated in 2025 with plans to operationalise it by 2026 and full capacity by 2035.
  - Another facility to service M88 engines is being constructed as of November 2025.
