= 2015 Seville Airbus A400M crash =

Cargo aircraft crash in 2015

2015 Seville A400M crash
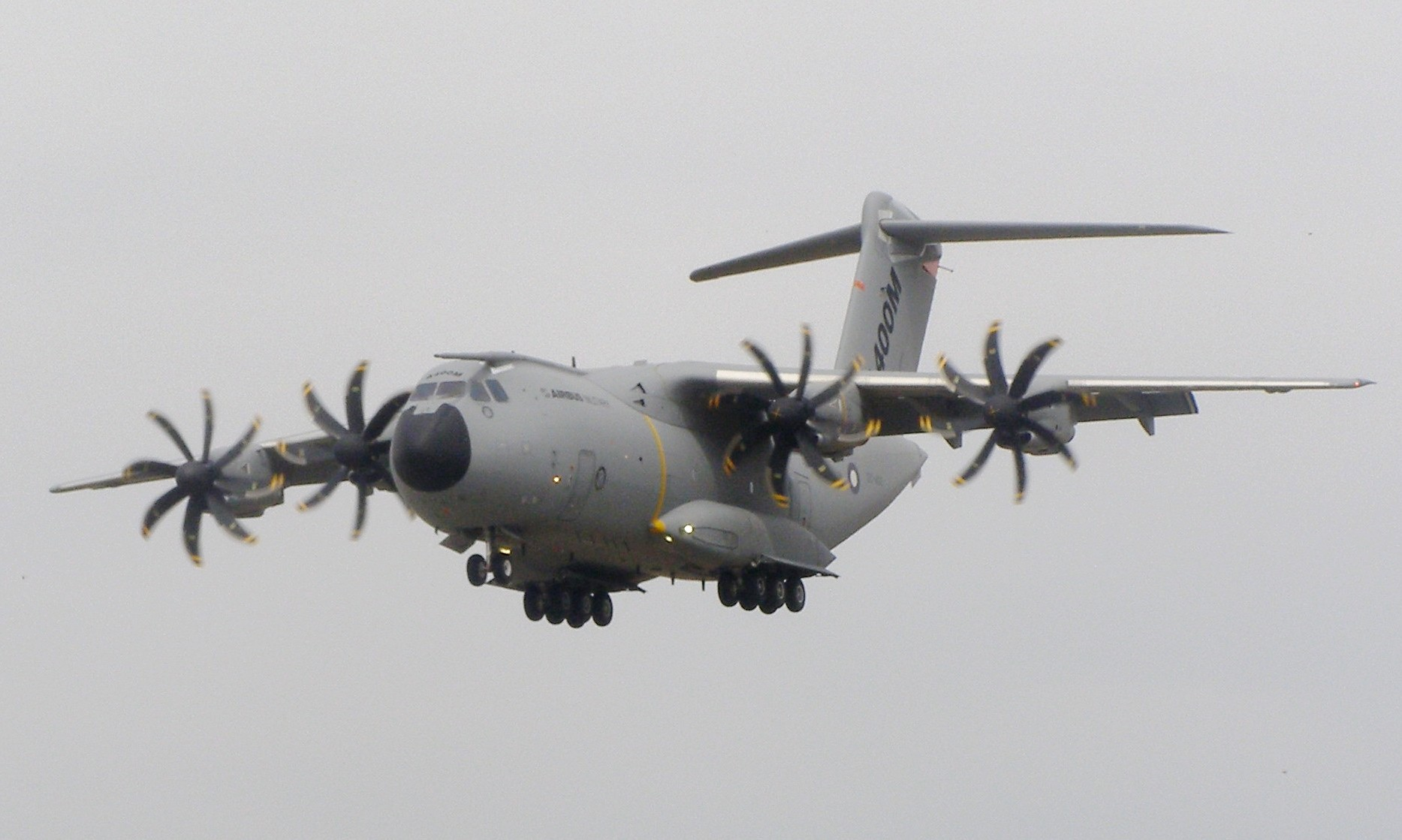
- The second prototype of the Airbus A400M Atlas

Accident
- Date: 9 May 2015
- Summary: Multiple engine failure during test flight
- Site: La Rinconada, Spain; 37.3667°N 5.9944°W

Aircraft
- Aircraft type: Airbus A400M Atlas
- Operator: Airbus Defence and Space
- Call sign: CASA423
- Registration: EC-403
- Flight origin: Seville Airport, Spain
- Occupants: 6
- Crew: 6
- Fatalities: 4
- Injuries: 2
- Survivors: 2

On 9 May 2015, an Airbus A400M Atlas military transport aircraft on a test flight crashed at La Rinconada, Spain, less than 5 kilometres (3.1 mi) from Seville Airport at around 1:00 pm local time, killing 4 of the 6 crew.

== Aircraft ==
The aircraft, serial number MSN023, was on its first pre-delivery test flight and was scheduled to be the third A400M to be delivered to the Turkish Air Force. The delivery was scheduled for June 2015. The aircraft was being flown by an Airbus Defence and Space test crew and used the callsign CASA423. As of May 2015, Airbus had delivered just 12 of the 174 ordered and the programme had been plagued by persistent quality issues, both in the final assembly facility in Spain, and in Germany.

== Flight ==
The pilots had reported that the plane had a technical fault and asked for permission to land, but hit an electricity pylon while attempting an emergency landing. Tracking data from the Flightradar24 website indicated the plane had veered to the left before coming down and that it had reached a maximum altitude of 1,725 feet (526 m) before descending at a constant speed of about 160 knots (300 km/h; 180 mph).

The six aircraft crew were Spanish employees of Airbus Defence and Space. Four of them were killed and the remaining two seriously injured. Three local men helped the two survivors, a mechanic and an engineer, escape from the wreckage.

== Aftermath ==
San Pablo Airport was closed following the accident. The Royal Air Force "temporarily paused" flying its two Atlas cargo planes as a result of this accident. The German, Malaysian, and Turkish air forces suspended operations of their A400M fleets following the accident. French Defence Minister Jean-Yves Le Drian said on 10 May 2015 that "only flights of extreme importance for operations will be allowed." One of Britain's A400Ms was reportedly stuck in New Mexico awaiting the lifting of the British defence ministry's self-imposed flight pause. Spain withdrew Airbus's permit to conduct flight tests of the A400M in Spain pending the results of the investigation. In a letter to employees on 11 May 2015, Airbus chairman Tom Enders said, "We want to show our clients and air forces that we are fully confident in this excellent transport plane." Testing of the A400M resumed the following day, with Fernando Alonso, head of Airbus Military, on board the test flight acting as a flight engineer. The flight was not affected by Spain's halt on test flights because the Airbus-owned prototype test plane, MSN4, was not scheduled for delivery.

At the time, approximately twenty A400Ms were on the Seville assembly line in different stages of production, each of which had to undergo testing before delivery. Airbus said on 12 May 2015 that "It is too early to know what impact [Spain's] decision will have on the supply chain." A400M MSN4 was to be used to complete the development of new capabilities through the Standard Operating Clearances process; SOC1.5 which finalised aerial delivery, cargo-handling systems, self-defence systems, and air-to-air refueling using wing-mounted pods.

On 14 May 2015, the Spanish Defence Ministry confirmed that Spain's military air crash investigation agency, CITAAM, had taken charge of the investigation of the crash. The Spanish government had initially charged a civilian team, made up of experts from the transport and defence ministries, with the task, but the civilian team "took the decision to withdraw because they understood that the plane has specific characteristics due to its military configuration which they were unfamiliar with," according to a Defence Ministry spokesman.

On 19 May 2015, Airbus Defence and Space requested all operators of its A400M airlifter to conduct one-time specific checks on electronic control units (ECUs) fitted to the TP400 turboprop engines on the aircraft. The company also has introduced additional detailed checks, to be carried out in the event of subsequent engine or ECU replacement. Airbus said these checks were necessary to "avoid potential risks in any future flights," and added that the alert had resulted from its internal analysis and was issued as "part of the continued airworthiness activities, independently from the ongoing official investigation into the accident."

On 21 May 2015, it emerged that the secretaries of state of the A400M member countries had established a Program Monitoring Team (PMT) to analyze and judge Airbus plans to bring the A400M project back on track and to schedule visits to the final-assembly line in Seville, Spain, and other A400M-production facilities. The first conclusions on program recovery made by the PMT include the observation that Airbus still does not have an integrated approach to production, development and retrofits, but treats these as separate programs.

On 11 June 2015, Spain's Ministry of Defence announced that Airbus could restart test flights for A400M prototypes in Spain. The Ministry confirmed that its specialist aerospace unit had met with Airbus to discuss flight permits, and that further permits relating to the plane program could be granted in the coming days. The UK Royal Air Force lifted its suspension on A400M flights on 16 June 2015, followed the next day by the Turkish Air Force. "Having undertaken and completed a series of thorough checks on the UK's A400M aircraft and how it is operated, the RAF is now satisfied that the additional processes and procedures introduced means it is now safe for the RAF to resume flying," the UK Ministry of Defence said. The first German Air Force A400M to fly post-crash took off from Wunstorf Air Base on 14 July 2015. Pilot Lt.Col. Christian Schott, part of Wunstorf's 10-strong operational testing and evaluation team, said, "the problems that led to the crash in Seville can be ruled out for our A400M... our aircraft has been thoroughly checked."

The first production-standard aircraft to leave the Seville final assembly line (FAL) after the 9 May grounding enacted by Spanish authorities was delivered to the French Air Force on 19 June, the day the flight suspension was lifted. The aircraft in question, MSN019, was the seventh delivered to France and the 13th delivered overall. The FAL also completed four aircraft for the United Kingdom, which underwent pre-delivery checks and trials before being flown to Royal Air Force (RAF) Brize Norton in Oxfordshire.

== Investigation ==
The Spanish government confirmed on 10 May 2015 that the plane's flight data recorder and cockpit voice recorder had been recovered. Despite being examined by a joint team from the Spanish ministries of development and defence, the Spanish authorities subsequently passed the recorders to the French military air accident investigation agency BEAD to extract and analyze the data. On 13 May 2015 it emerged that technical issues were slowing retrieval of the crash data; General Bruno Caïtucoli, head of BEAD, reported that "there are technical issues in reading the system, and it is a question of compatibility between systems, so we are still trying to extract data. The extracting system we are using belongs to the French defence procurement agency DGA," Caïtucoli said, noting that the problem appeared to be a compatibility issue between the recorders and the DGA's data reading system, rather than an issue with the condition of the recorders themselves.

Several reports suggested that as many as three of the aircraft's four engines failed during the A400M's departure from Seville. Airbus initially focused on whether the crash was caused by new management software for the engine-fuel supply, designed to trim the fuel tanks to permit the aircraft to fly certain military manoeuvres. There appeared to have been a trimming issue, leading to strong banking that was not recoverable and that the fuel supply was re-established, but not quickly enough for recovery to safe flight.

Airbus Chief Strategy Officer Marwan Lahoud confirmed on 29 May that incorrectly installed engine control software caused the fatal crash. "The black boxes attest to that there are no structural defects [with the aircraft], but we have a serious quality problem in the final assembly." Two days earlier, Airbus CEO Tom Enders criticized Spanish agencies for withholding the flight recorder data. "We would like to see the data and compare it with our hypothesis and proceed quickly to understand the causes of accident, so our aircraft can get back into the air," he told shareholders at the company's annual general meeting in Amsterdam on 27 May.

Senior Airbus executive, Fabrice Bregier, said on 30 May 2015 that there was "either a weakness in the test procedure of planes before they fly, or a problem that results from the implementation of these procedures." On 3 June 2015 Airbus announced that investigators had confirmed "that engines one, two and three experienced power frozen after lift-off and did not respond to the crew's attempts to control the power setting in the normal way. Preliminary analyses have shown that all other aircraft systems performed normally and did not identify any other abnormalities throughout the flight." The key scenario being examined by investigators is that the torque calibration parameter data was accidentally wiped on three engines as the engine software was being installed at Airbus facilities, which would prevent the FADECs from operating. Under the A400M's design, the first warning pilots would receive of the engine data problem would be when the plane was 120 metres (390 ft) in the air; on the ground, there is no cockpit alert.
