= Europrop International =

Aerospace engine consortium

- Company type: Joint venture
- Industry: Aerospace
- Predecessor: Aero Propulsion Alliance
- Founded: 2002; 24 years ago
- Products: Europrop TP400
- Owner: MTU Aero Engines; Rolls-Royce; Safran Aircraft Engines; ITP Aero
- Number of employees: 2,500

Europrop International (EPI) GmbH is a consortium set up in 2002 in the form of a company governed by German law, by the four main European aircraft engine manufacturers, MTU Aero Engines, Safran Aircraft Engines, Rolls-Royce and ITP Aero.

EPI GmbH is tasked with designing, developing, marketing, manufacturing and providing support for the TP400-D6 turboprop engine designed to power the Airbus A400M Atlas military transport aircraft built by Airbus Defence and Space.

The TP400 is the most powerful turboprop in the world currently in production.

Europrop International GmbH brings together around 2,500 people across Europe who are invested in the TP400-D6 program. Based in Munich, the Europrop International teams also operate out of Madrid, Seville and Berlin. The final assembly of the TP400-D6 engine is carried out in Munich before being delivered to Airbus in Seville.

== History ==
Europrop was established in 2002. One year after its inception the TP400 was selected by Airbus Military to design the engine to power the A400M. In 2004, work began on analyzing the engine design, with the initial ground tests taking place a year later. The first engine run with propeller took place in 2006, with the first flight of the TP400 aboard a testbed taking place in 2008.

The first flight of the A400M took place in 2009. Two years later the TP400 engine received EASA certification. The first engines were delivered in 2012. The French Air Force began using the A400M in 2013. The following year, the engine was delivered to a further three countries: Turkey, the United Kingdom and Germany. The year 2015 marked the first delivery to the Royal Malaysian Air Force, the first export customer for the A400M and TP400, and in 2016, the first delivery was made to the Spanish Air Force.

In 2017, EPI GmbH signed a support contract with the Royal Malaysian Air Force, which was extended in 2019.
