= Europrop TP400 =

Military turboprop engine

TP400
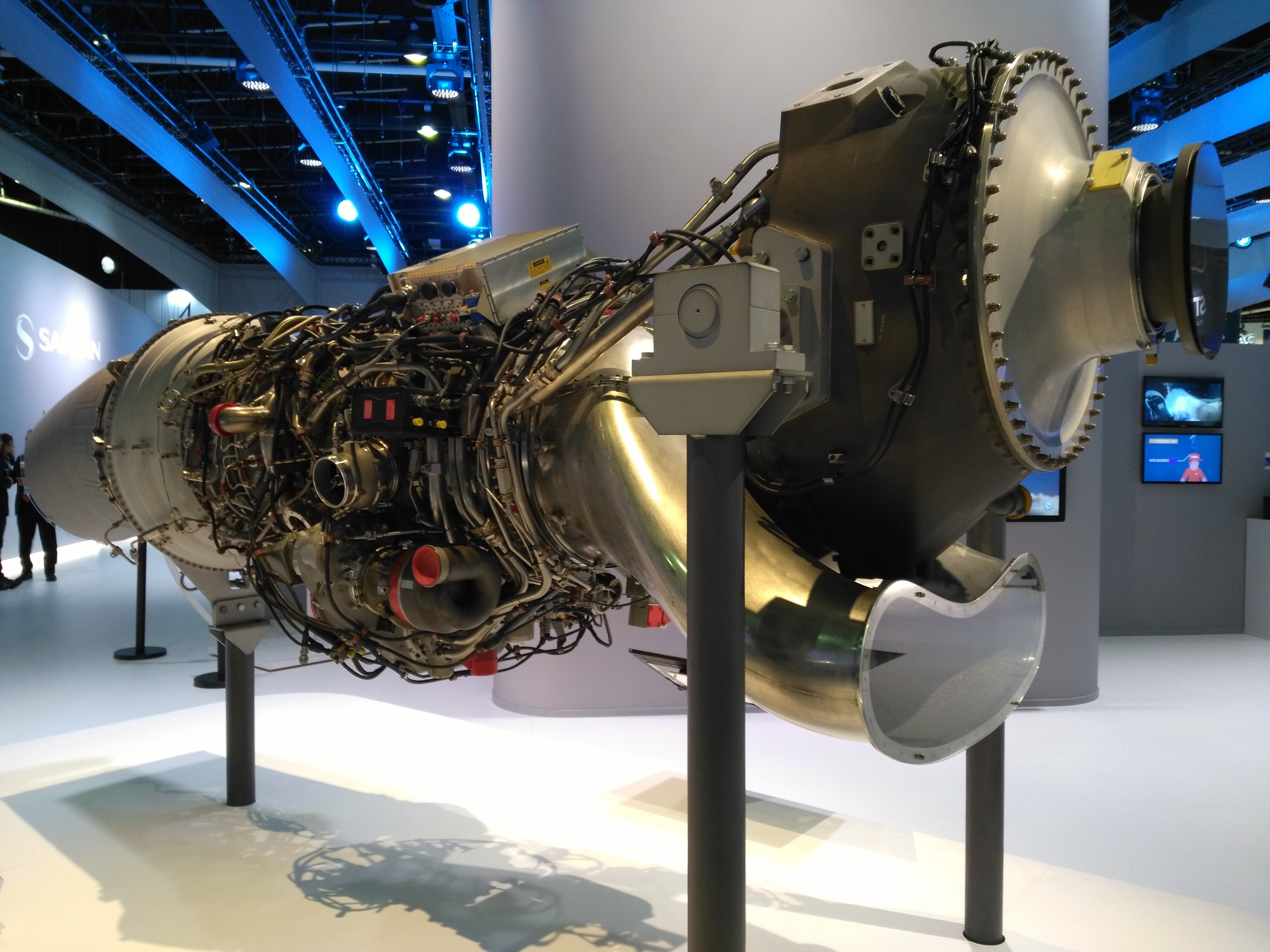
- TP400 presented by Safran at the 2017 Paris Air Show.
- Type: Turboprop
- National origin: Multinational
- Manufacturer: Europrop International
- First run: 28 October 2005
- Major applications: Airbus A400M
- Number built: 400+

The Europrop International TP400-D6 is an 11,000 shp (8,200 kW) powerplant, developed and produced by Europrop International for the Airbus A400M Atlas military transport aircraft. The TP400 is the most powerful turboprop in service using a single propeller; only the Soviet-designed Kuznetsov NK-12 and Progress D-27, using contra-rotating propellers, are larger.

== Development ==
The TP400 was originally selected by Airbus Military to power the A400M in December 2000. However, Airbus reopened the engine competition in February 2002, because the engine core, which is based on the Snecma M88 turbofan fighter engine, was too heavy and used too much fuel. By May 2002, Pratt & Whitney Canada (P&WC) announced a proposal involving a 12,000 shp (8,900 kW) turboprop with a core based on its PW800 turbofan, a 53–89 kN (5,400–9,100 kgf; 12,000–20,000 lbf) regional jet engine under development that had a geared fan at the time; the concept would later be called the PW180. In 2003, around the 30 April decision deadline, Airbus Chief Executive Noël Forgeard told reporters that the P&WC proposal was 20 percent cheaper than for the TP400, and that he would have chosen to give the contract to P&WC, but government officials requested an extension for the companies to revise their bids. Before the final bids were modified, sources claimed that P&WC's offering, which had a European production percentage of 75 percent, was lower by US$400 million. On 6 May, amidst pressure from European political and business leaders, Airbus awarded a US$3.4 billion contract to Europrop to produce 900 engines for the A400M, despite accusations of European protectionism. A member of Europrop claimed after the decision that the TP400 contract would only increase the costs of the US$22.7 billion A400M program by about 1–2 percent compared to if the PW180 had been selected.

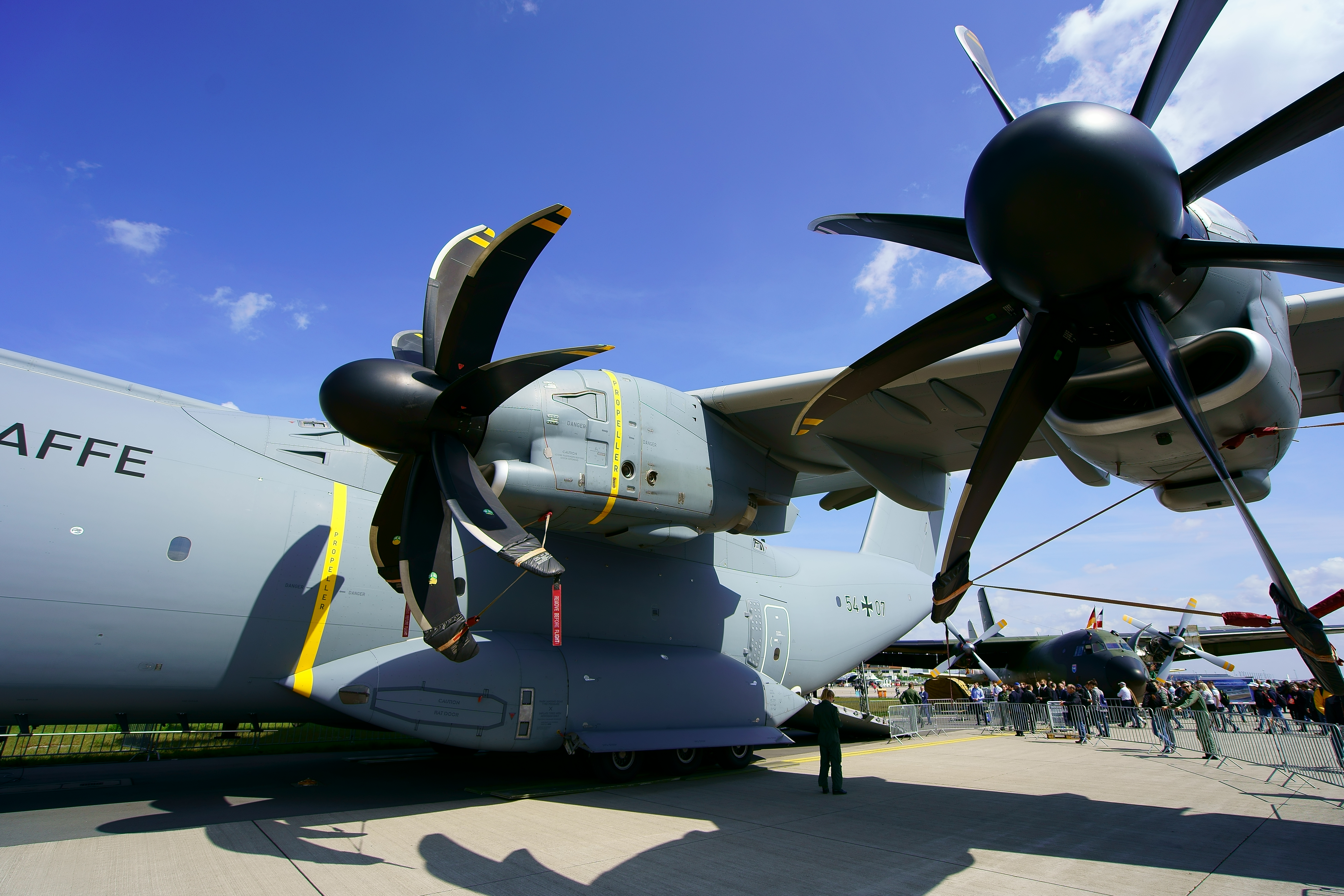
Two TP400 engines on the port wing of an Airbus A400M Atlas at the 2018 ILA Berlin Air Show. With the image zoomed in, the LH or RH markers become visible on the propeller blades, indicating that the blades are for the left-handed and right-handed propeller, respectively.

The signing of the A400M contract between Airbus Military and the European defense purchasing agency OCCAR on May 27, 2003, marked the beginning of the aircraft development program, which was planned to last 77 months (6 years, 5 months). At the 2003 Paris Air Show, Europrop signed a €300 million contract with former engine consortium partner Avio to supply the gearboxes. However, because of mechanical and aerodynamic problems that Lockheed Martin encountered on its C-130J Super Hercules upgrade, which used new engines and propellers that had half the planned output of the TP400, Airbus retained the option to select the engine configuration and the propeller for itself. The TP400 development schedule, which was considered very ambitious, had the bench run of the engine targeted for within 27 months (2 years, 3 months) of the contract signing, or August 2005. In spite of Europrop's insistence that testing on a specialized engine testbed aircraft was unnecessary, Airbus pushed for such a program on the Airbus A300 or A340 starting 11 months after the first ground tests. The engine testbed program would cost Airbus an estimated €40 million.

In July/August 2003, Airbus signed a contract worth up to US$830 million with Ratier-Figeac to supply the propellers, which would be 5.33 meters (17.5 feet) in diameter and have eight composite blades. By May 2004, Airbus decided that the A400M design would have a "handed" propeller configuration, meaning that the pair of propellers on each wing would turn in opposite directions known as rotating "down between engines". Two different gearboxes are required, one with extra components to reverse the rotation of the propeller. This counter-rotating propeller design meant the TP400 engine would have to be certificated for two different gearbox/propeller configurations. Airbus awarded Marshall Aerospace a contract in December 2004 to flight test the TP400 engine on a Lockheed C-130K Hercules aircraft, targeting flights in mid-2006 and hoping for a first flight in April of that year. Other testbed airframes considered were the Ilyushin Il-76 and what was thought to be the favorite, Airbus's own A340-300 testbed aircraft, because, unlike the C-130, it could reach the A400M maximum cruise speed. The TP400 large propeller would still have enough ground clearance with the engine installed on the A340 low-mounted wing.

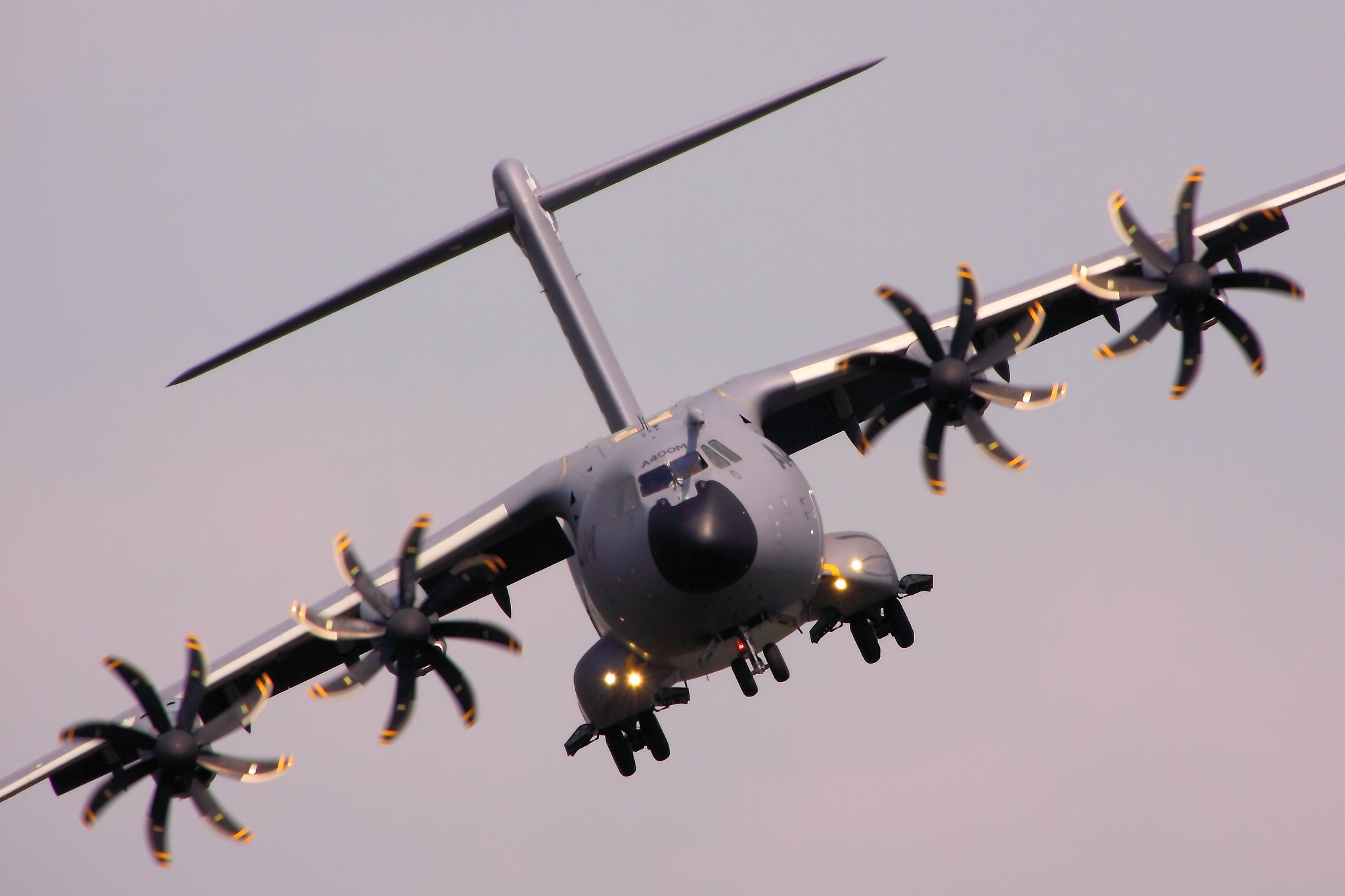
A400M showing its counter-rotating propellers on each wing. A small difference in the propeller gearboxes is required to make them go in opposite directions, namely the addition of an idler gear in two of them.

According to the engine master program presented in September 2006, the TP400 was to reach its first engine run by the end of August 2005, followed by the first combined engine and propeller run by the end of that year. The TP400 would fly on its own specialized testbed aircraft by the end of 2006, and the engine would be certified with the "handed" propeller by the end of October 2007, 54 months (4 years, 6 months) into the engine program. The first test flight of the TP400-powered A400M would follow by the end of the next month, and engine certification with the baseline propeller would occur by the end of March 2008. Finally, the qualification test would finish by the end of January 2009.

After a two-month delay, the engine first ran on 28 October 2005 using a dynamometer to absorb and measure the power developed by the engine. During subsequent testing, the engine reached full power. On 28 February 2006, the engine was tested for the first time with the propeller installed. Europrop delivered the first TP400 engine for engine testbed flight testing on 19 November 2007. In June 2008, the TP400 had a first ground run on the inboard port wing of the C-130K engine testbed, and integration was completed onto the first A400M production aircraft. After 24 hours of ground runs and taxi trials, the first flight of a single TP400-D6 engine took place on 17 December 2008. Airbus and Marshall completed flight testing on the C-130K testbed aircraft completed on 30 September 2009 after 18 flights, 55 flight hours, and 61 hours of ground tests, although the design of the C-130K airframe limited the maximum cruise speed to Mach 0.64 instead of the TP400 propeller's Mach 0.72 maximum. On 18 November 2009, an A400M test aircraft completed a ground run for the first time with all four TP400 engines, quickly followed by the A400M's first taxi trial on 23 November 2009. On 11 December 2009, the maiden flight of the A400M took place. The engine earned civil certification from the European Aviation Safety Agency (EASA) on 6 May 2011. By April 2012, EASA certified Ratier-Figeac's FH385/FH386 propellers for the TP400, and on 13 March 2013 it granted a type certificate for the A400M aircraft. The aircraft and engine officially entered service on 30 September 2013 with the French Air Force.

Several technical problems delayed the engine's certification test program and pushed the entire A400M aircraft program into further scheduling adjustments. The engine delays were primarily due to problems with completing the full authority digital engine control (FADEC) software to the satisfaction of the civil authorities. More specifically, Europrop determined in mid-2008 that the engine worked correctly, but the FADEC software still did not meet EASA requirements. Since the A400M was intended for humanitarian missions, the aircraft also needed to have a civil certification. Europrop did not realize that this meant that every change made to the software in the FADEC had to be documented to enable traceability so EASA denied civil certification of the software. Because of this problem, the first A400M test aircraft, which was flight-ready by September 2008, was not permitted to fly. Europrop had to triple the size of its workforce to fix the issue, resulting in a FADEC system consisting of over 275,000 lines of code, which was four times more complex than the FADEC software for the largest civil jet engine.

Further problems arose in 2016 with the propeller gearbox. It showed abnormal wear and inadequate management of the heat generated in the reduction gearing which required premature servicing. This problem led to the German Air Force temporarily grounding two of its three A400M aircraft, and also resulted in a Royal Air Force aircraft suffering an inflight engine shutdown. An interim fix for this engine issue was certified in July 2016. The gearbox issues persisted, and as of July 2018, the final fix was planned to be introduced by the end of that year.

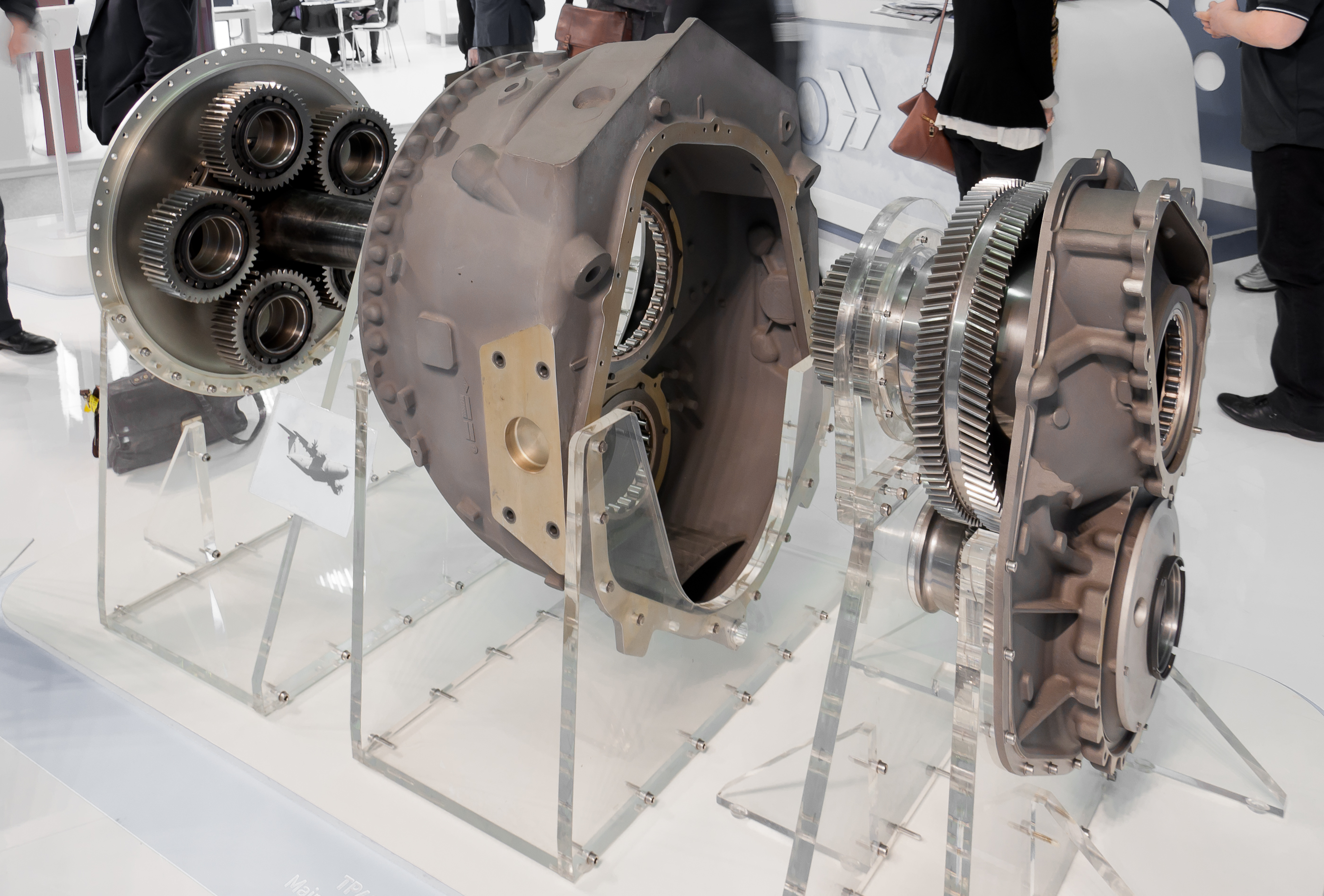
The TP400 propeller gearbox on display at the 2013 Paris Air Show.

== Design ==
The TP400 has a three-shaft configuration, consisting of a two-shaft gas generator followed by a free-power turbine. It has a chin air intake, for its mass flow of 26.3 kilograms per second (3,480 pounds per minute).

In the gas generator, the low pressure compressor, called an intermediate pressure compressor (IPC) by Europrop International because it is driven by an IP turbine, is designed by MTU Aero Engines and has five stages. The high-pressure compressor (HPC) is designed by Rolls-Royce and has six stages, the first two of which are variable. Design lessons learned and experience gained on previous engine programs are incorporated in the design of the TP400. Snecma supplied the combustor, which is based on the combustor of its M88 turbofan fighter engine. To drive the HPC, Snecma designed the high pressure turbine (HPT), also using M88 experience. The MTU design for their IPT uses Turbo-Union RB199 and Eurojet EJ200 turbofan fighter engine experience. Both the Snecma HPT and the MTU IPT have one stage with unshrouded HPT blades and IPT blades with shrouds. The shaft connecting the IPC to the IPT rotates in the opposite direction to the HP shaft through which it passes. The overall pressure ratio is 25:1. The IP compressor has a pressure ratio of 3.5:1, and the HP compressor a pressure ratio of 7:1.

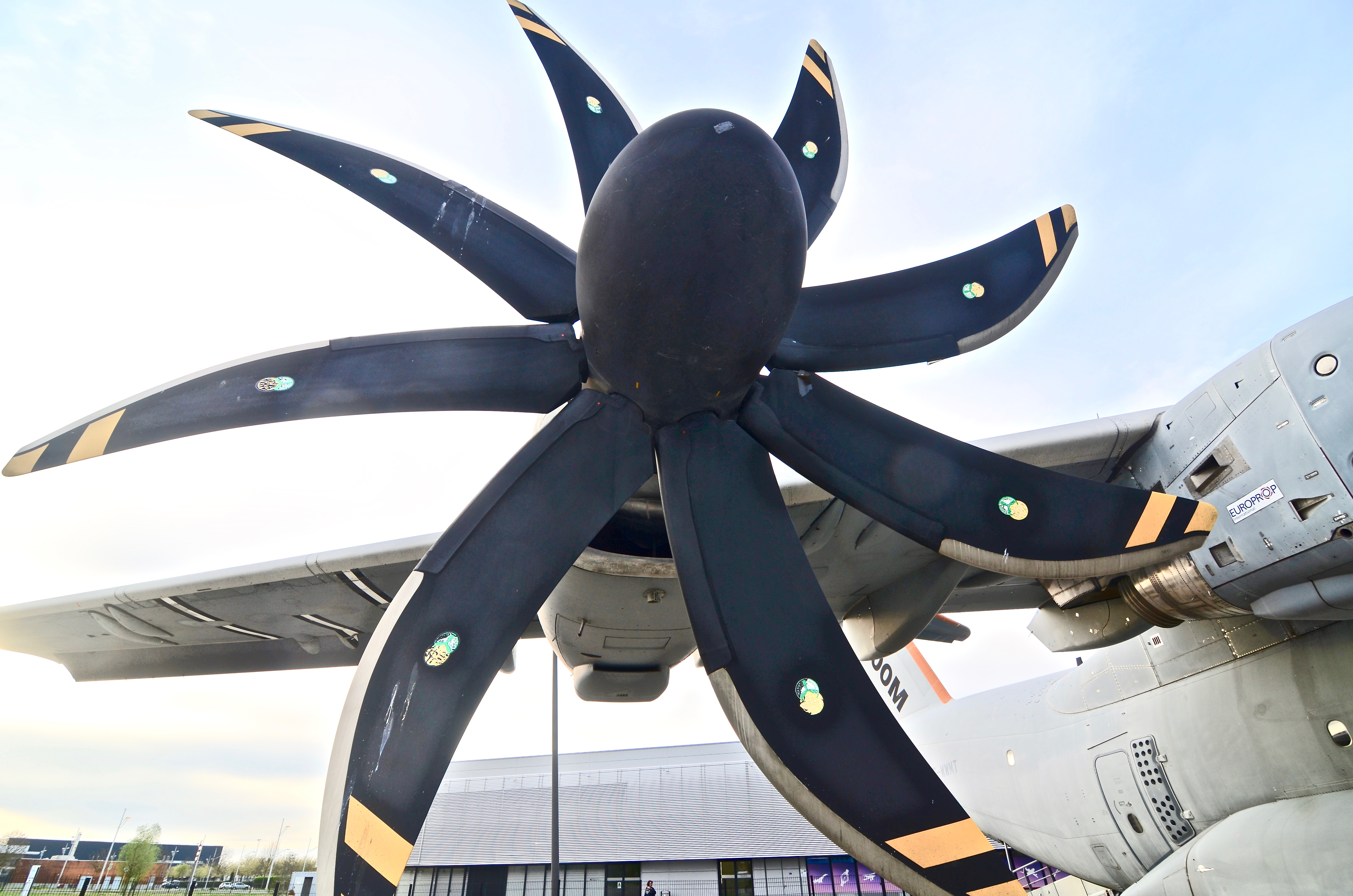
A closeup of the highly swept Ratier-Figeac propellers.

The low pressure turbine (LPT) is provided by Industria de Turbo Propulsores (ITP), and it is derived from the LPT of the Rolls-Royce BR715 regional turbofan. This free-power turbine drives the propeller through a third coaxial shaft and a reduction gearbox. The Avio-produced gearbox has a maximum power output of about 8,000 kW (11,000 hp). Reduction occurs in two stages: a first-stage offset design, followed by a second-stage planetary system. The total reduction gear ratio is about 9.5:1. The maximum gearbox output torque is 100 kilonewton-meters (74,000 pound force-feet). Early prototype gearbox cases were made using aluminum alloy, but magnesium alloy is used for production engines to reduce weight. Two slightly different gearbox designs are required on each aircraft to make two propellers turn in one direction and the other two in the opposite direction depending on their position on the wing. The difference in the gearbox is the addition of an idler gear so those without the idler gear turn in one direction and those with turn in the opposite direction. The respective engines are known as baseline and handed, either of which may also be fitted with a propeller brake.

The propeller is designed by Ratier-Figeac and has a diameter of 5.33 m (17.5 ft). The reversible, variable-pitch propeller holds eight blades, each having a carbon spar enclosed by a composite shell and a polyurethane coating. Its blades have a scimitar shape that results in a sweep angle of about 55 degrees at the blade tips, which have a helical speed of 290 m/s (951 ft/s; 1,044 km/h; 648 mph) at the A400M's cruise speed of Mach 0.68. The propeller has four rotational speed settings: 655, 730, 842 and 860 rpm. The 655 rpm setting is for low-altitude cruise, 730 rpm for normal cruise, and 842 rpm for takeoff and special maneuvers. The propeller converts the engine power into 110 kN (11,000 kgf; 25,000 lbf) of thrust.

== Specifications (TP400-D6) ==
Data from EASA type certificate data sheet for TP400-D6, issue 07, page 6

==== General characteristics ====
- Type: 3-spool axial flow turboprop
- Length: 4.18 m (13 ft 9 in)
- Diameter: 1.218 m (4 ft 0 in)
- Propeller diameter: 5.334 m (17 ft 6.0 in)
- Dry weight: 1,938.1 kg (4,273 lb) for baseline engine (propeller clockwise); 1,965.1 kg (4,332 lb) for handed engine (propeller anti-clockwise)
- Propeller weight: 683 kg (1,506 lb)

==== Components ====
- Compressor: MTU 5-stage intermediate pressure compressor, Rolls-Royce 6-stage high pressure compressor with 2 variable stages
- Combustors: Snecma annular combustion chamber with 18 fuel nozzles
- Turbine: Snecma single-stage high pressure turbine; MTU single-stage intermediate pressure turbine; ITP 3-stage low pressure turbine
- Fuel type: Jet A, Jet A1, Jet B, JP4, JP5, JP8, and JP8+100

==== Performance ====
- Maximum power output: Uprated takeoff: 8,251 kW (11,065 hp); Maximum continuous: 7,971 kW (10,690 hp)
- Overall pressure ratio: 25
- Air mass flow: 26.3 kg/s (58 lb/s)
- Turbine inlet temperature: 1,200 °C (2,190 °F)
- Specific fuel consumption: In cruise: 210 g/kWh (0.35 lb/(hp⋅h))
- Power-to-weight ratio: 4.26 kW/kg (2.59 hp/lb)

== See also ==
- Kuznetsov NK-12
- Pratt & Whitney XT57
- Pratt & Whitney/Allison 578-DX
- Progress D-27

Related lists

- List of aircraft engines

== Bibliography ==
- Hoyle, Craig (17 Nov 2017). "Can TP400 gearbox fix lift Atlas programme?". FlightGlobal.
- "A400M engine flying test bed". Marshall Aerospace and Defence Group. 13 August 2014. Archived from the original on 20 September 2014.
- Sheahan, Maria; Cutler, David (7 June 2010). Robinson, Simon; Ledwith, Sara (eds.). "Timeline: Fraught journey of A400M transport aircraft". Reuters. Berlin, Germany.
- Dubois, Thierry (17 June 2009). "TP400 nears Fadec trials, certification". Defense. AINonline. Paris, France.
- Hepher, Tim (25 September 2008). Moss, Brian (ed.). "Engine makers hit back at Airbus on A400M". Market News. Reuters. Paris, France.
- Daly, Kieran (1 July 2008). "Rolls-Royce promotes turboprop solution for new civil airliners". FlightGlobal.
- "Ground runs commence on Airbus A400M flight test bed at Marshall Aerospace" (PDF). Teamwork. Marshall Group. Summer 2008. p. 5.
- "Airbus Military A400M flight test bed programme advances at Marshall Aerospace" (PDF). Teamwork. Marshall Group. Spring 2008. p. 8.
- Dubois, Thierry (14 November 2006). "A400M on target for October 2009 delivery". AINonline.
- Nagy, Barbara; Moran, John M. (7 May 2003). "Airbus jettisons Pratt for Euro bid". Hartford Courant. ISSN 1047-4153.
- Nagy, Barbara; Remez, Michael (6 May 2003). "Pratt bid appears to hit bias". Hartford Courant. ISSN 1047-4153.
