= Airbus A400M Atlas =

Multi-national four-engine turboprop military transport aircraft

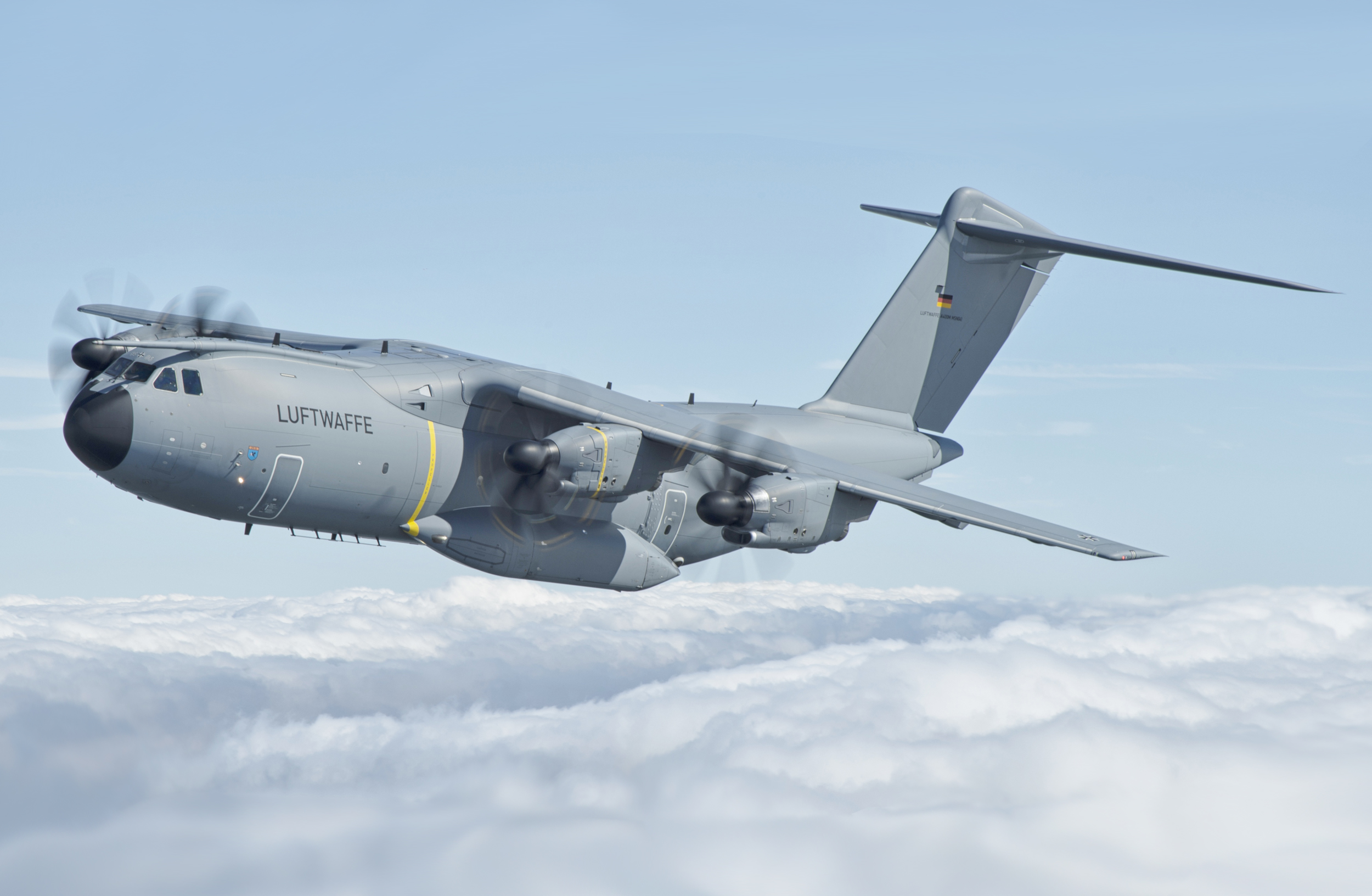
- A German Air Force A400M in flight

General information
- Type: Strategic/tactical airlift / Aerial refueling
- Manufacturer: Airbus Defence and Space
- Status: In service
- Primary users: German Air Force French Air and Space Force; Royal Air Force; Spanish Air and Space Force; See Operators below for others
- Number built: 130 as of 31 January 2025

History
- Manufactured: 2007–present
- Introduction date: 2013
- First flight: 11 December 2009

The Airbus A400M Atlas (Note: Named after the Greek mythological figure.) is a European four-engine turboprop military transport aircraft. It was designed by Airbus Military, now Airbus Defence and Space, as a tactical airlifter with strategic capabilities to replace older transport aircraft such as the Transall C-160 and the Lockheed C-130 Hercules.

The A400M is sized between the C-130 and the Boeing C-17 Globemaster III. It can carry heavier loads than the C-130 and can use rough landing strips. In addition to its transport capabilities, the A400M can perform aerial refueling and medical evacuation when fitted with appropriate equipment.

The A400M's maiden flight took place on 11 December 2009 from Seville Airport, Spain. Between 2009 and 2010, the A400M faced cancellation as a result of development programme delays and cost overruns; however, the customer nations chose to maintain their support for the project. A total of 174 A400M aircraft had been ordered by eight nations by July 2011. In March 2013, the A400M received European Aviation Safety Agency (EASA) certification and the first aircraft was delivered to the French Air Force in August 2013.

== Development ==
=== Origins ===
The project has its origins in the Future International Military Airlifter (FIMA) group, established in 1982 as a joint venture between Aérospatiale, British Aerospace (BAe), Lockheed, and Messerschmitt-Bölkow-Blohm (MBB) with the goal of developing a replacement for both the C-130 Hercules and Transall C-160. Varying requirements and the complications of international politics meant that progress on the initiative was slow. In 1989, Lockheed decided to withdraw from the grouping. Lockheed independently developed an upgraded Hercules, the C-130J Super Hercules. With the addition of Alenia of Italy and CASA of Spain, the FIMA group became Euroflag.

Project management evaluated twin and quad turbofan engine configurations, a quad propfan configuration, and a quad turboprop configuration, eventually settling on the turboprop option. Since no existing turboprop engine in the western world was powerful enough to reach the projected cruise speed of Mach 0.72, a new engine design was required. Originally, the SNECMA M138 turboprop, based on the M88 turbofan core, was selected, but this powerplant was found to be incapable of satisfying the requirements. In April 2002, Airbus Military issued a new request for proposal (RFP), which Pratt & Whitney Canada with the PW180 and Europrop International answered. In May 2003, Airbus Military selected the Europrop TP400-D6. United Technologies alleged that the selection was a result of political interference.

A Europrop partner executive said in April 2003 that Airbus was close to selecting the P&WC offer, claiming it was more than €400 million (US$436.7 million) cheaper than Europrop's bid. As the original deadline for the engine decision passed, Airbus CEO Noel Forgeard said that P&WC's bid was nearly 20 percent less expensive, and declared that "As of today Pratt and Whitney is the winner without doubt [but] a much lower offer could make us change our minds", inviting Europrop to revise its offering, which it reportedly reduced in price by 10 or 20 percent. A later report described the revised bid as exceeding P&WC's bid by €120 million.

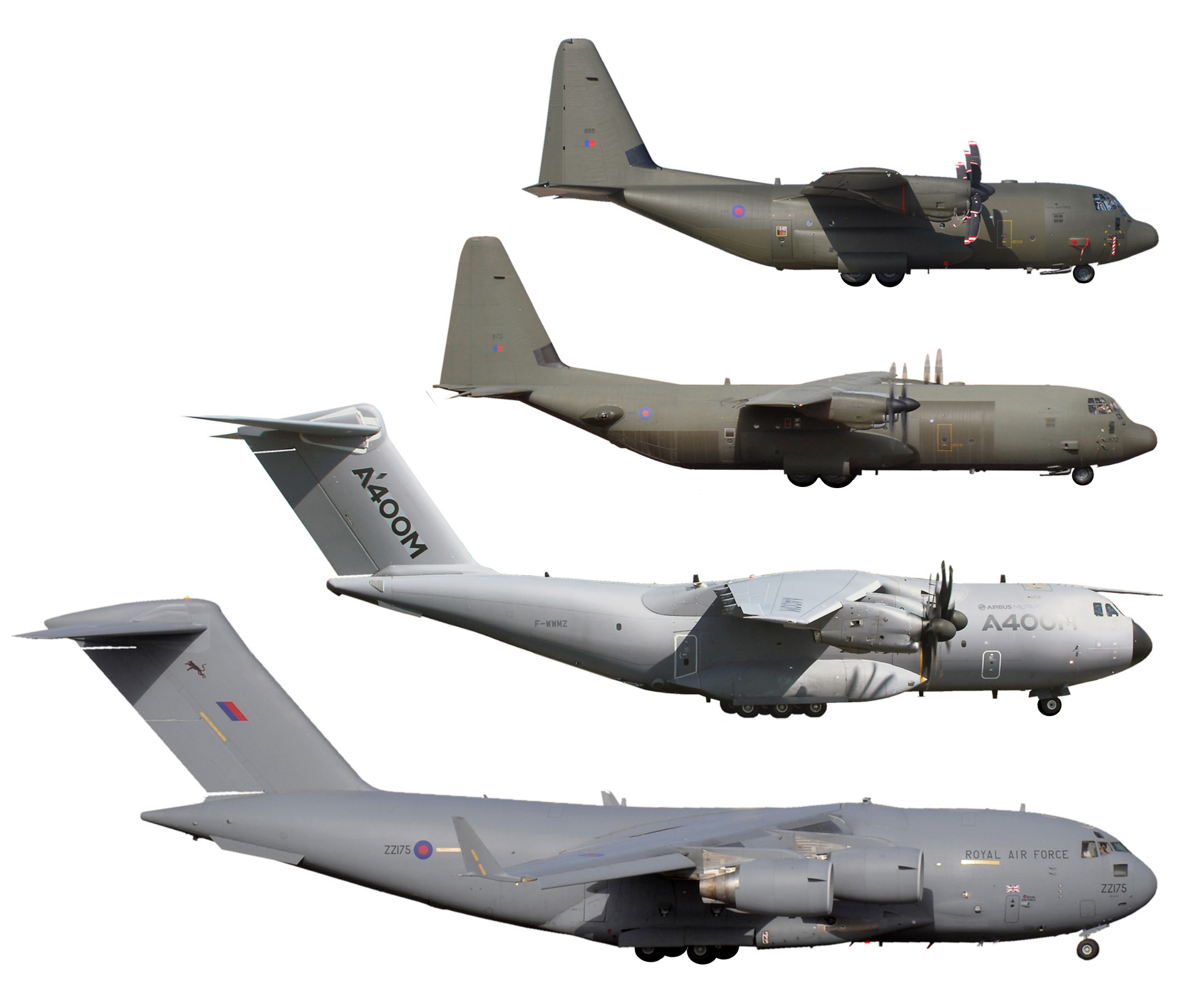
The A400M (third from top) and aircraft it is intended to replace or complement: C-130 (top), C-130J-30 and C-17 (bottom).

The original partner nations were France, Germany, Italy, Spain, the United Kingdom, Turkey, Belgium, and Luxembourg. These nations decided to charge the Organisation for Joint Armament Cooperation (OCCAR) with the management of the acquisition of the A400M. Following the withdrawal of Italy and revision of procurement totals, the revised requirement amounted to 180 aircraft. The first flight was forecast to occur in 2008 and first delivery in 2009. In April 2005, South Africa joined the programme, with the Denel Saab Aerostructures receiving a contract for fuselage components. Malaysia was the second country outside Europe to be involved. Malaysia through CTRM is responsible for manufacturing composite aero components for the aircraft.

The A400M is positioned as an intermediate size and range between the Lockheed C-130 and the Boeing C-17, carrying cargo too large or too heavy for the C-130, while able to use rough landing strips.

=== Delays and problems ===
In January 2009, EADS announced that the first delivery was postponed from 2009 until at least 2012, and indicated that it wanted to renegotiate. EADS maintained the first deliveries would begin three years after the first flight. In January 2009, Financial Times Deutschland reported that the A400M was overweight by 12 tons and may not have been able to meet a key performance requirement, the ability to airlift 32 tons. Sources told FTD that it could only lift 29 tons, insufficient to carry an infantry fighting vehicle like the Puma. In response to the report, the chief of the German Air Force stated: "That is a disastrous development," and that it could delay deliveries to the German Air Force (Luftwaffe) until 2014. The Initial Operational Capability (IOC) for the Luftwaffe was later delayed and alternatives, such as a higher integration of European airlift capabilities, were studied.

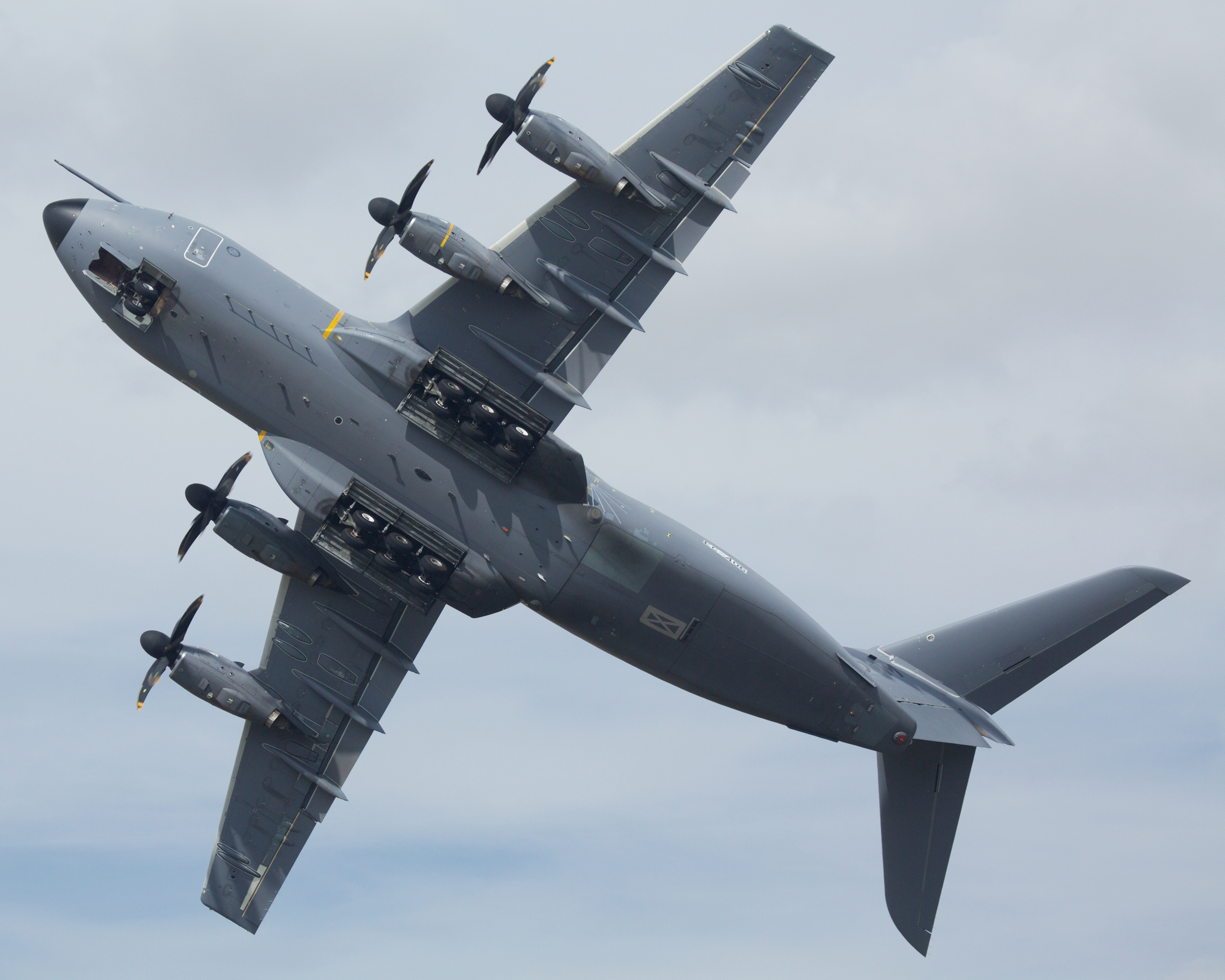
An A400M viewed from below

On 29 March 2009, Airbus CEO Tom Enders told Der Spiegel that the programme could possibly be abandoned without changes. OCCAR reminded participating countries that they could terminate the contract before 31 March 2009. In April 2009, the South African Air Force announced that it was considering alternatives to the A400M due to delays and increased cost. On 5 November 2009, South Africa announced the cancellation of its order. On 12 June, The New York Times reported that Germany and France had delayed a decision whether to cancel their orders for six months while the UK planned to decide in late June. The NYT also quoted a report to the French Senate from February 2009, noting: "the A400M is €5 billion over budget, 3 to 4 years behind schedule, [and] aerospace experts estimate it is also costing Airbus between €1 billion and €1.5 billion a year."

In 2009, Airbus acknowledged that the programme was expected to lose at least €2.4 billion and could not break even without export sales. A PricewaterhouseCoopers audit projected that it would run €11.2 billion over budget, and that corrective measures would result in an overrun of €7.6 billion. On 24 July 2009, the seven European nations announced that the programme would proceed and formed a joint procurement agency to renegotiate the contract. On 9 December 2009, the Financial Times reported that Airbus requested an additional €5 billion subsidy. In January 2010, Airbus repeated that the A400M could possibly be scrapped, costing it €5.7 billion unless €5.3 billion was added by partner governments. Delays had already increased its budget by 25%. Airbus executives reportedly regarded the A400M as competing for resources with the A380 and A350 XWB programmes.

In June 2009, Lockheed Martin said that both the UK and France had requested details on the C-130J as an alternative to the A400M.

In November 2010, Belgium, Britain, France, Germany, Luxembourg, Spain and Turkey finalised the contract and agreed to lend Airbus Military €1.5 billion. The programme was then at least three years behind schedule. The UK reduced its order from 25 to 22 aircraft and Germany from 60 to 53, decreasing the total order from 180 to 170.

In 2013, France's budget for 50 aircraft was €8.9 billion (~US$11.7 billion) at a unit cost of €152.4 million (~US$200 million), or €178 million (~US$235 million) including development costs. The 2013 French White Paper on Defence and National Security cut the tactical transport aircraft requirement from 70 to 50. As the A400M was unable to perform helicopter in-flight refuelling, France announced in 2016 that it would purchase four C-130Js. In July 2016, French aerospace laboratory ONERA confirmed successful wind tunnel trials of a 36.5 m (120 ft) hose and drogue configuration to permit helicopter refuelling by the A400M. Prior tests found instability in the intended 24 m (79 ft) hose due to vortices generated by the spoilers, deployed to achieve 108-130 kt air speed.

In April 2016, production faults affecting 14 propeller gearboxes (PGBs) produced by Italian supplier Avio Aero were discovered. The issue, involving a heat treatment process that weakened the ring gear, affected no other PGBs; the units involved needed changing. Airbus noted: "pending full replacement of the batch, any aircraft can continue to fly with no more than one affected propeller gearbox installed and is subject to continuing inspections." Another PGB issue involved input pinion plug cracking, which could release small metallic particles into the oil system, which is safeguarded by a magnetic sensor. Only engines 1 and 3, which have propellers that rotate to the right, were affected. The European Aviation Safety Agency (EASA) issued an Airworthiness Directive mandating immediate on-wing inspection, followed by replacement if evidence of damage was found. On 27 April 2016, Airbus warned there may be a substantial PGB repair cost. An interim PGB fix was certified in July 2016, greatly extending inspection intervals.

In May 2016, Airbus confirmed that a cracking behaviour identified during quality control checks in 2011 was found in a French A400M's fuselage part. Not impacting safety, it could be repaired during regular maintenance/upgrade schedules. The aluminium-zinc alloy, known as 7000 series, was used in several central frames. Its chemistry, along with environmental conditions, led to crack propagation. The alloy was excluded from future aircraft. A retrofit to remove it from early A400Ms, which could take up to seven months, was considered.

On 29 May 2016, Enders conceded in an interview published in Bild am Sonntag that some of the "massive problems" of the A400M were of Airbus' own making: "We underestimated the engine problems...Airbus had let itself be persuaded by some well-known European leaders into using an engine made by an inexperienced consortium." Furthermore, it had assumed full responsibility for the engine. On 27 July 2016, Airbus confirmed that it took a US$1 billion charge over delivery issues and export prospects. Enders also stated that "Industrial efficiency and the step-wise introduction of the A400M's military functionalities are still lagging behind schedule and remain challenging."

=== Flight testing ===
Before the first flight, required airborne test time on the Europrop TP400 engine was achieved using a C-130 testbed aircraft, which first flew on 17 December 2008. On 11 December 2009, the A400M's maiden flight was carried out from Seville. In April 2010, the second A400M made its first flight. In July 2010, the third A400M took to the air, at which point the fleet had flown 400 hours over more than 100 flights. In July 2010, the A400M passed ultimate-load testing of the wing. In October 2010, Airbus announced the start of refuelling and air-drop tests. By October 2010, the A400M had flown 672 hours of the 2,700 hours expected to reach certification. In November 2010, the first paratroop jumps were performed. Enders and A400M project manager Bruno Delannoy were among the skydivers.

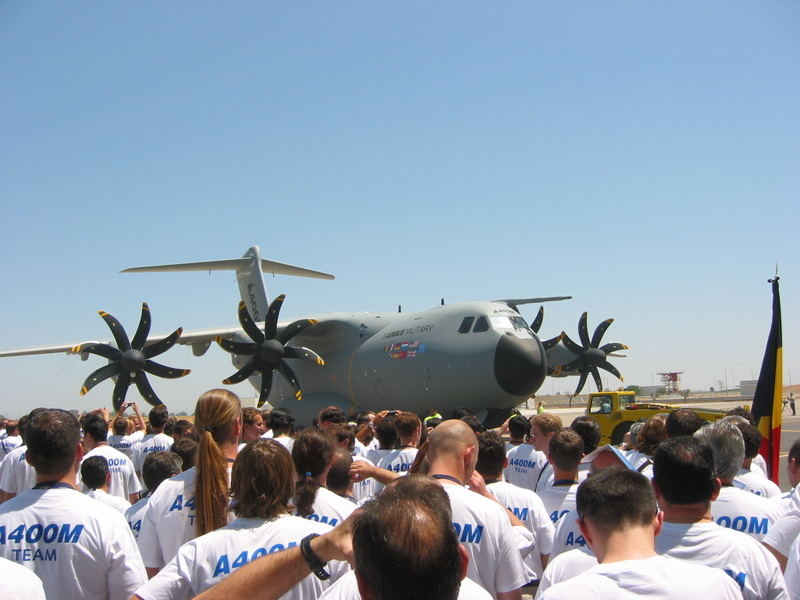
The first A400M during its global presentation in Seville, June 2008

In late 2010, simulated icing tests were performed on the MSN1 flight test aircraft using devices installed on the wing's leading edges. These revealed an aerodynamic issue causing horizontal tail buffeting, resolved via a six-week retrofit to install anti-icing equipment fed with bleed air. Production aircraft are similarly fitted. Winter tests were done in Kiruna, Sweden in February 2011. In March 2012, high-altitude start and landing tests were performed at La Paz at 4,061.5 m (13,325 ft) and Cochabamba at 2,548 m (8,360 feet) in Bolivia.

By April 2011, a total of 1,400 flight hours over 450 flights had been achieved. In May 2011, the TP400-D6 engine received certification from the EASA. In May 2011, the A400M fleet had totalled 1,600 hours over 500 flights. By September 2011, the total increased to 2,100 hours and 684 flights. Due to a gearbox problem, an A400M was shown on static display instead of a flight demonstration at the 2011 Paris Air Show. By October 2011, total flight hours had reached 2,380 over 784 flights.

In May 2012, the MSN2 flight test aircraft was due to spend a week conducting unpaved runway trials on a grass strip at Cottbus-Drewitz Airport in Germany. Testing was cut short on 23 May, when, during a rejected takeoff test, the left side main wheels broke through the runway surface. Airbus Military stated that it found the aircraft's behaviour was "excellent". The undamaged aircraft returned to Toulouse.

At the 2012 Royal International Air Tattoo, the aircraft was officially named "Atlas"

In March 2013, the A400M was granted type certification by the EASA, clearing its entry to service.

=== Production and delivery ===
Assembly of the first A400M began at the Seville plant of EADS Spain in early 2007. Major assemblies built at other facilities abroad were brought to the Seville facility by Airbus Beluga transporters. In February 2008, four Europrop TP400-D6 flight test engines were delivered for the first A400M. Static structural testing of a test airframe began in March 2008 in Spain. By 2010, Airbus planned to manufacture 30 aircraft per year. The Turkish partner, Turkish Aerospace Industries, delivered the first A400M component to Bremen in 2007.

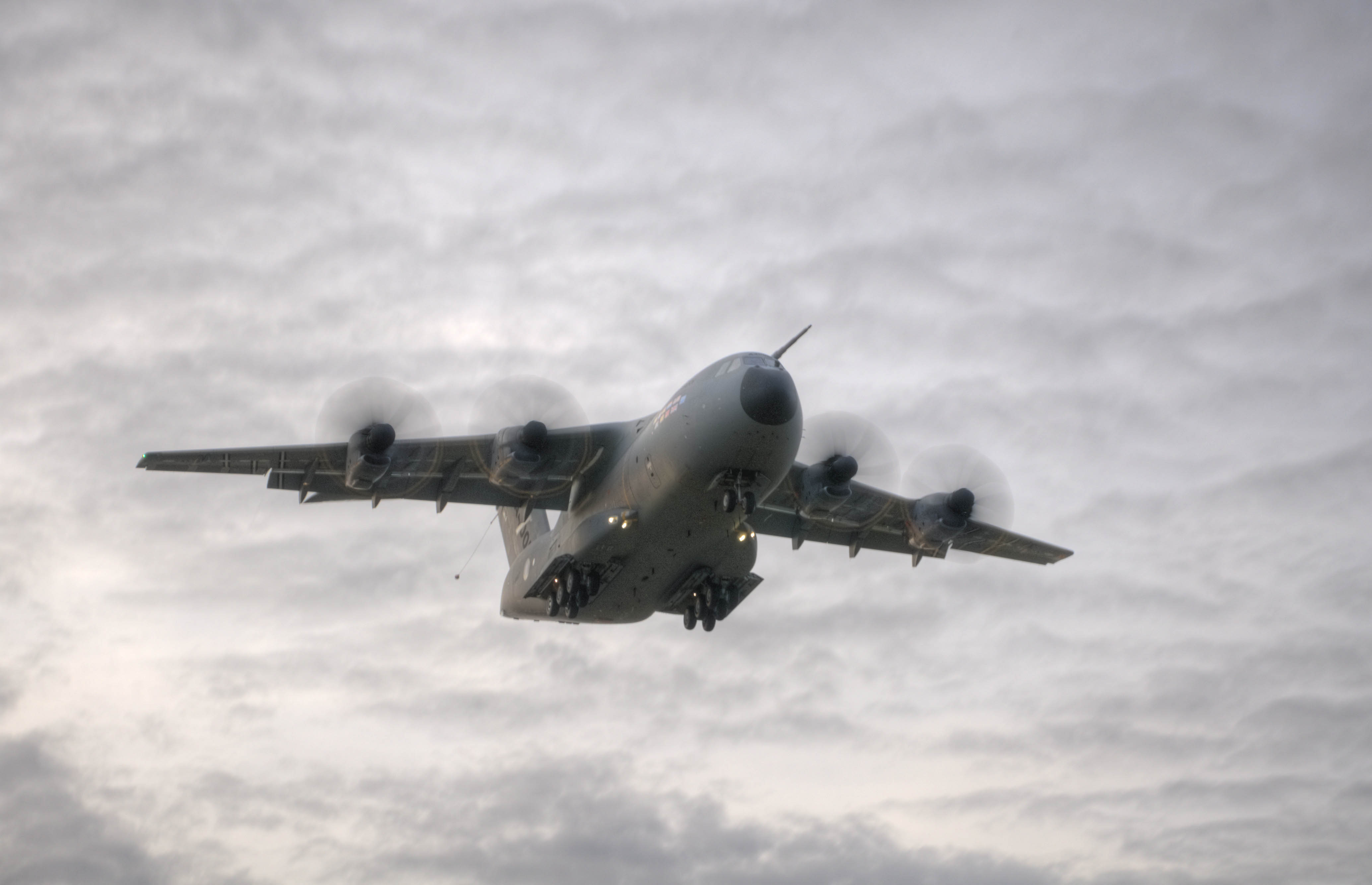
The first A400M during its fourth flight, January 2010

The first flight, originally scheduled for early 2008, was postponed due to delays and financial pressures. EADS announced in January 2008 that engine issues had been responsible for the delay. The rescheduled first flight, set for July 2008, was again postponed. Civil certification under EASA CS-25 was followed by certification for military uses. In June 2008, the A400M was rolled out in Seville at an event presided by King Juan Carlos I of Spain.

On 12 January 2011, serial production began. In August 2013, the first A400M was delivered to the French Air Force. It was formally handed over during a ceremony in September 2013. In August 2013, the first Turkish A400M conducted its maiden flight from Seville. In March 2015, Malaysia received its first A400M.

In May 2015, it was revealed that the member nations had created a Programme Monitoring Team (PMT) to review and monitor progress in the A400M's development and production. The PMT inspects the final assembly line in Seville and other production sites. Early conclusions observed that Airbus lacked an integrated approach to production, development and retrofits, treating these as separate programmes.

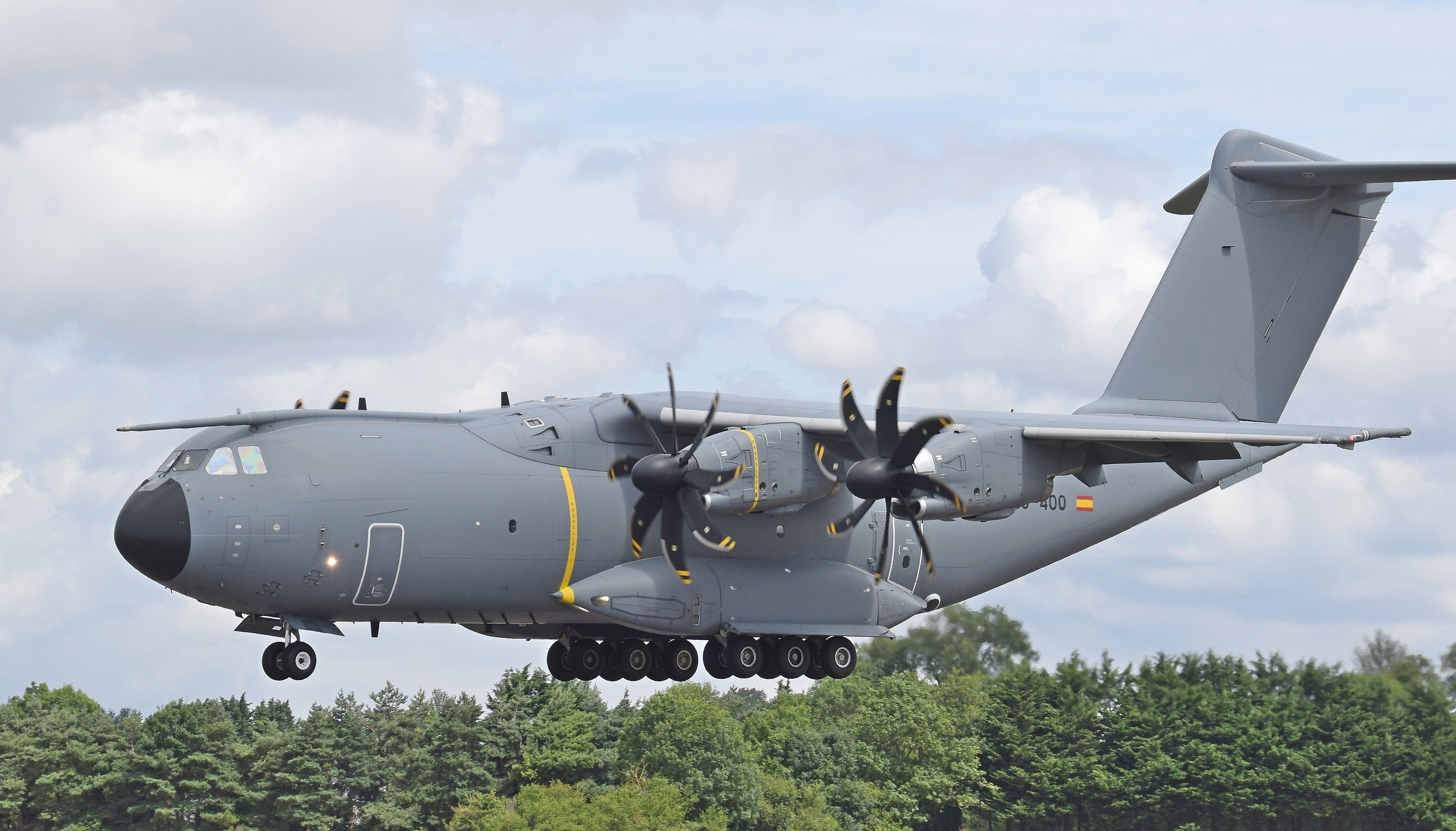
An A400M demonstrator arrives for the 2019 RIAT, England.

On 9 May 2015, an A400M crashed in Seville on its first test flight. Germany, Malaysia, Turkey and UK suspended flights during the investigation. Initial focus centered on whether the crash had been caused by new fuel supply management software for trimming the fuel tanks to enable certain manoeuvres; Airbus issued an update instructing operators to inspect all Engine Control Units (ECUs). A key scenario examined by investigators was that the torque calibration parameter data had accidentally been wiped on three engines during software installation, preventing FADEC operations. On 3 June 2015, Airbus announced that investigators had confirmed "that engines one, two and three experienced power frozen after lift-off and did not respond to the crew's attempts to control the power setting in the normal way."

On 11 June 2015, Spain's Ministry of Defence announced that prototypes could restart test flights and that further permits could soon be granted. The RAF lifted its suspension on A400M flights on 16 June 2015, followed the next day by the Turkish Air Force. On 19 June 2015, deliveries restarted. In June 2016, the French Air Force accepted its ninth A400M, the first capable of conducting tactical tasks such as airdropping supplies. The revised standard includes the addition of cockpit armour and defensive aids system equipment, plus clearance to transfer and receive fuel in-flight.

== Design ==
=== Design and specifications ===
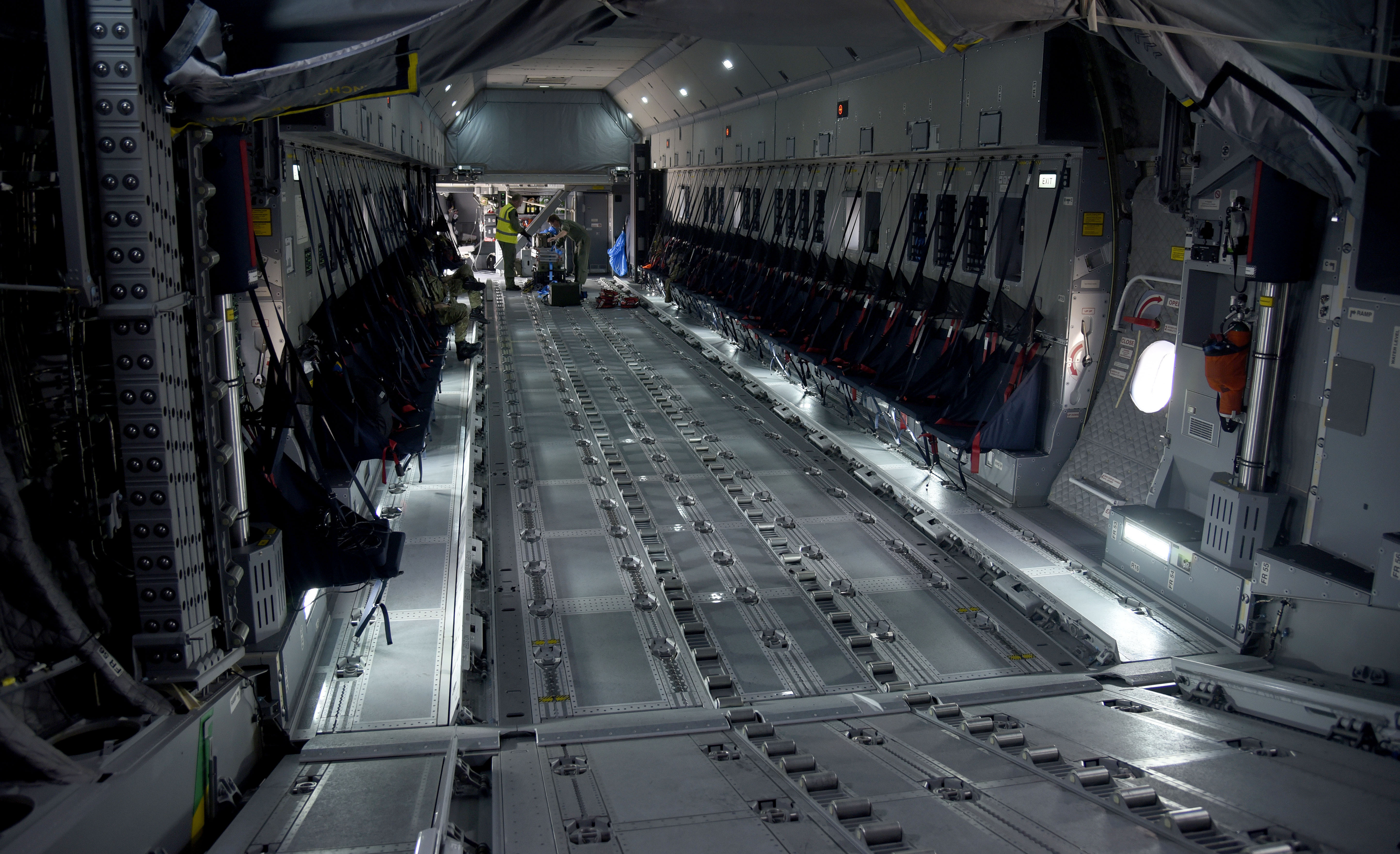
A400M cargo compartment

The Airbus A400M provides substantial improvements to payload, range, internal volume and operational capacity over the Transall C-160 and Lockheed C-130 that it replaces or augments. It can carry up to 37 tonnes (41 short tons) over 2,000 nmi (3,700 km; 2,300 mi). The cargo box is 17.71 m (58.1 ft) long excluding ramp, 4.00 m (13.12 ft) wide, and 3.85 m (12.6 ft) high (or 4.00 m (13.12 ft) aft of the wing). and can be configured to transport cargo or military personnel, drop paratroops, conduct medical evacuations or carry out aerial refuelling. It can operate out of short, soft landing strips and fly long-range cargo. A typical cargo load might include six Land Rovers and their trailers, or two light armoured vehicles, or a dump truck and excavator, or a Patriot missile system, or a Puma or Cougar helicopter, or a truck and 25-ton trailer.

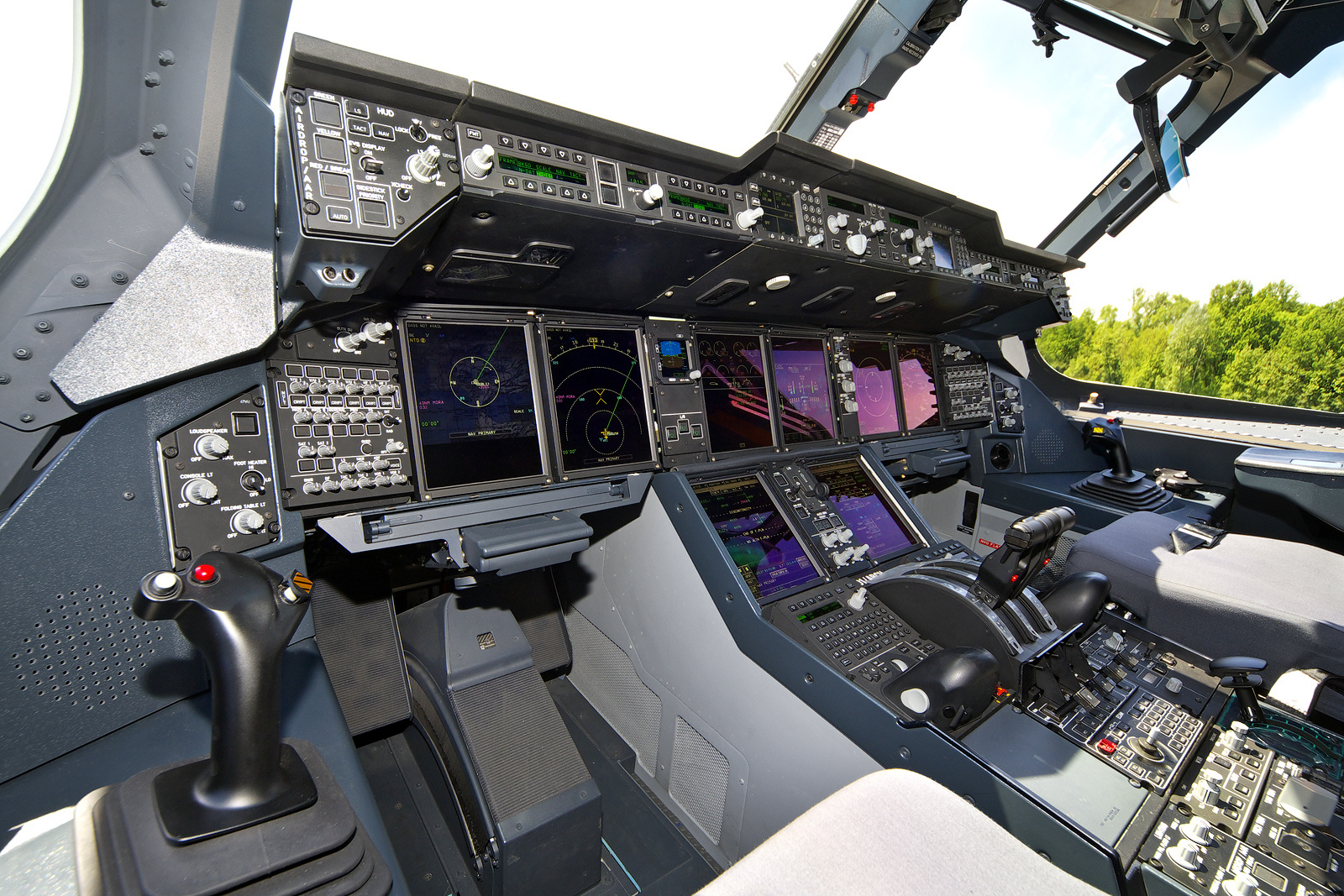
Cockpit with side-stick and glass cockpit avionics

The A400M features a fly-by-wire flight control system with sidestick controllers and flight envelope protection. Like other Airbus aircraft, it has a full glass cockpit. Most systems are loosely based on those of the A380, but modified for the military mission. The hydraulic system has dual 20.7 MPa (3,000 psi) channels powering the primary and secondary flight-control actuators, landing gear, wheel brakes, cargo door and optional hose-and-drogue refuelling system. As with the A380, there is no third hydraulic system. Instead, there are two electrical systems. One is a set of dual-channel electrically powered hydraulic actuators, the other an array of electrically/hydraulically powered hybrid actuators. The dissimilar redundancy provides more protection against battle damage.

In June 2019, Airbus Defence and Space was awarded a contract by the German Federal Office of Bundeswehr Equipment, Information Technology and In-Service Support (BAAINBw) to integrate and certify the J-MUSIC Directed Infrared Countermeasure (DIRCM) system into the A400M's Defensive Aids Sub-System (DASS) for the German Air Force. The DE DIRCM system, provided by Diehl Defence GmbH & Co. KG and based on Elbit Systems Ltd.'s J-MUSIC technology, enhances the aircraft's self-protection capabilities against infrared-guided missiles. The contract was scheduled to be performed over a four-year period.

More than 30 percent of the airplane's structure is made of composite materials. The 42.4 m (139 ft) span wing is primarily made of carbon fibre reinforced plastic components, including the wing spars, the 19 m (62 ft) long, 12–14 mm (0.47–0.55 in) thick wingskins, and other parts. The wing weighs about 6,500 kg (14,330 lb), and it can carry and lift up to 25,000 kg (55,116 lb) of fuel. It has an aspect ratio of 8.1, a wide chord of 5.6 m (18 ft), and a sweep angle of 15 degrees at 25 percent mean aerodynamic chord.

The A400M has a T-tail empennage. Its vertical stabiliser is 8.02 m (26.3 ft) tall. The horizontal stabiliser spans 19.03 m (62.4 ft), with a sweep of 32.5 degrees.

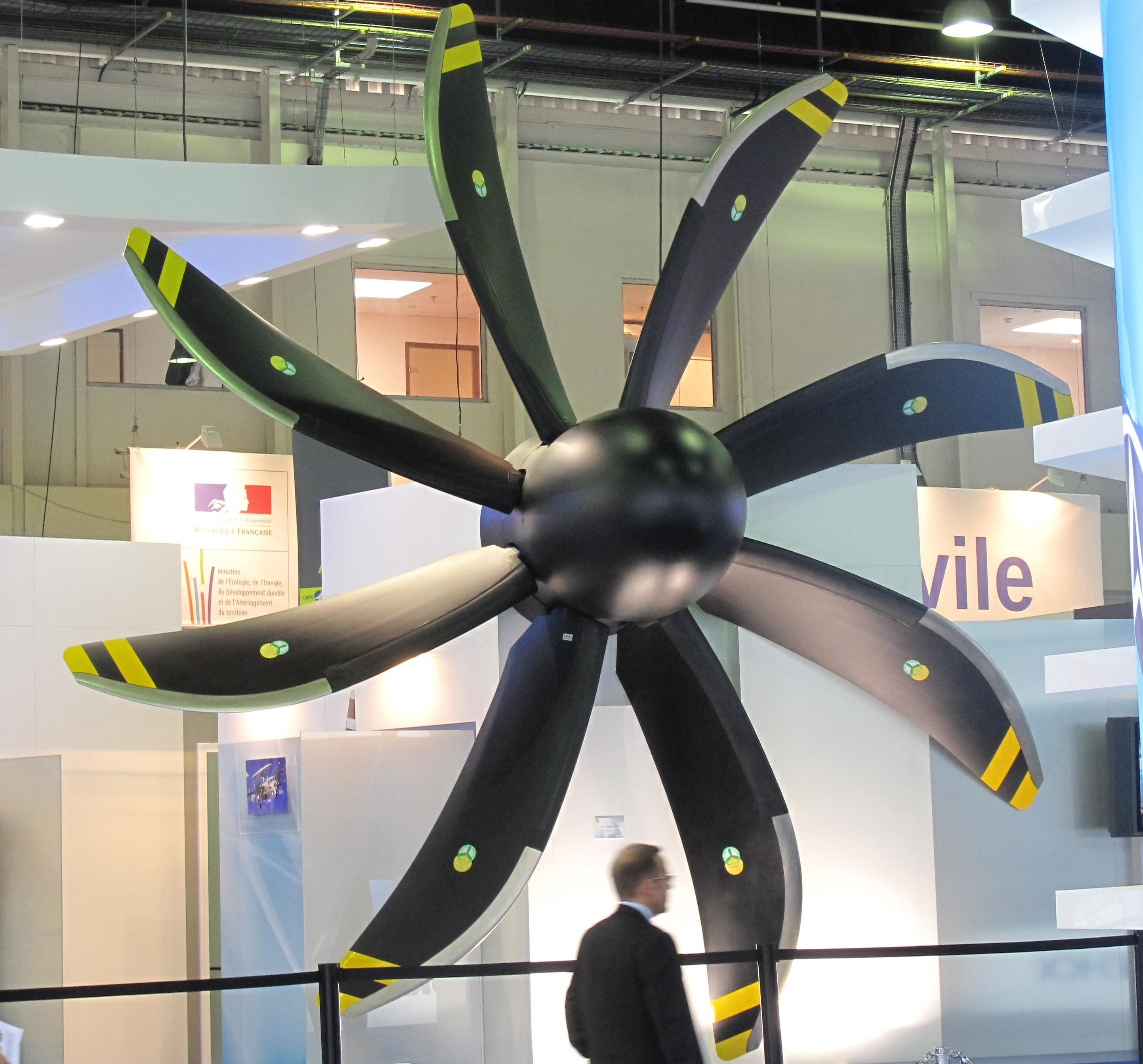
A400M Hamilton Sundstrand propeller at the Paris Air Show, 2009

The Ratier-Figeac FH385 propellers turn counterclockwise and the FH386 clockwise. The eight-bladed scimitar propellers are made from a woven composite material. The aircraft is powered by four Europrop TP400-D6 engines rated at 8,250 kW (11,000 hp) each. The TP400-D6 engine is the most powerful turboprop engine in the West to enter operational use.

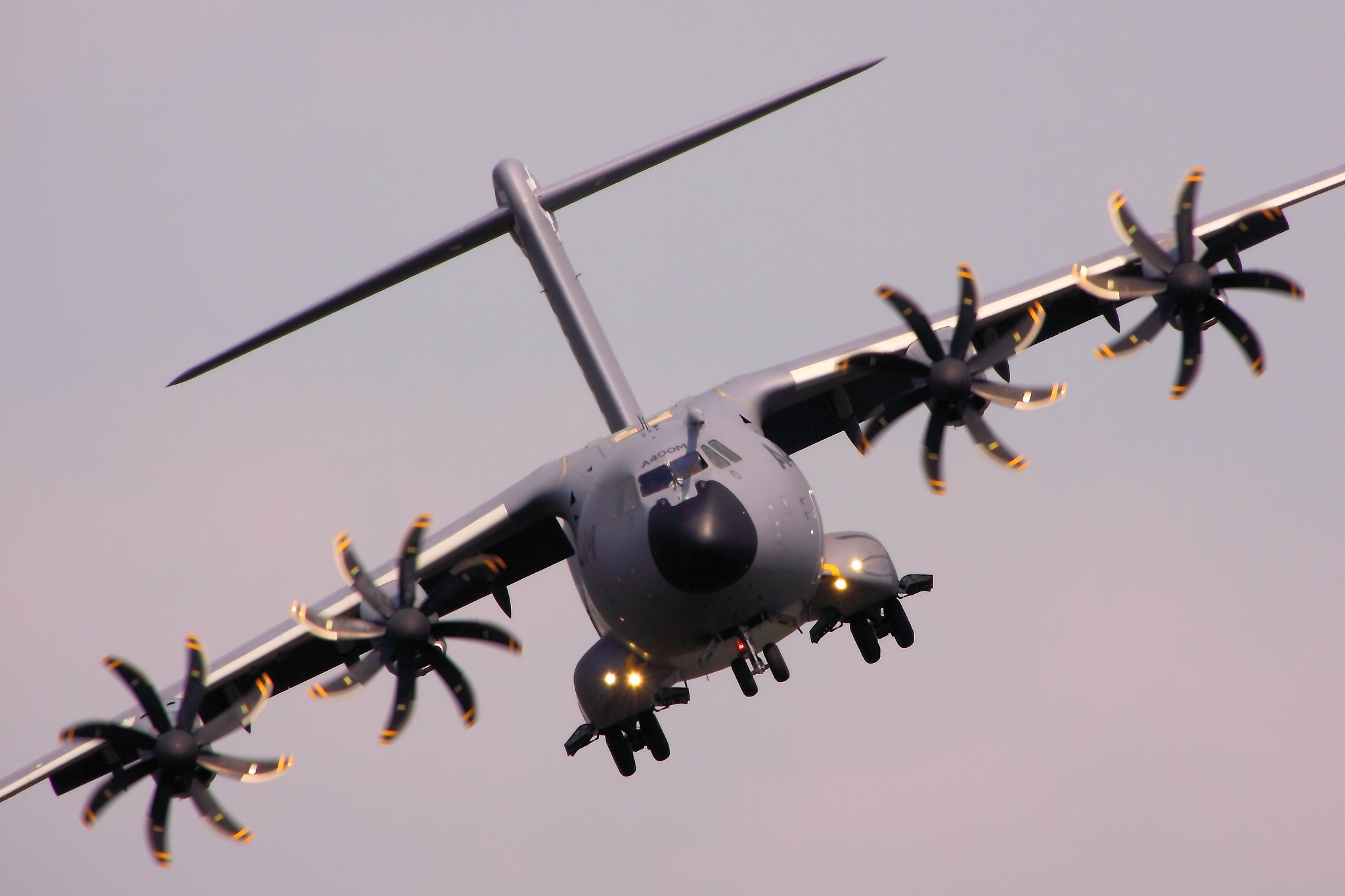
A400M showing its counter-rotating propellers on each wing

The pair of propellers on each wing turn in opposite directions, with the tips of the propellers advancing from above towards the midpoint between the two engines. This is in contrast to the overwhelming majority of multi-engine propeller driven aircraft where all propellers turn in the same direction. The counter-rotation is achieved by the use of a gearbox fitted to two of the engines, and only the propeller turns in the opposite direction. All four engines are identical and turn in the same direction. This eliminates the need to have two different "handed" engines on stock for the same aircraft, simplifying maintenance and supply costs. This configuration, dubbed down between engines (DBE), allows the engine to produce more lift and lessens the torque and prop wash on each wing. It also reduces yaw in the event of an outboard engine failure. Due to these benefits, the vertical stabiliser can be reduced by 17 percent in size, while the size of the horizontal stabiliser can be shrunk by 8 percent.

A forward-looking infrared enhanced vision system (EVS) camera provides an enhanced terrain view in low-visibility conditions. The EVS imagery is displayed on the HUD for low-altitude flying, demonstrating its value for flying tactical missions at night or in clouds. EADS and Thales provide the new Multi-Colour Infrared Alerting Sensor (MIRAS) missile warning sensor for the A400M.

The A400M has a removable refuelling probe mounted above the cockpit, allowing it to receive fuel from drogue-equipped tankers. Optionally, the receiving probe can be replaced with a fuselage-mounted UARRSI receptacle for receiving fuel from boom equipped tankers. The aircraft can act as a tanker when fitted with two wing mounted hose and drogue under-wing refuelling pods or a centre-line Hose and Drum unit. The refuelling pods can transfer fuel to other aircraft at a rate of 20.0 kg/s (2,640 lb/min).

The A400M features deployable baffles in front of the rear side doors, intended to give paratroops time to get clear of the aircraft before they are hit by the slipstream.

=== Roles and capabilities ===
The A400M is designed as a multirole aircraft.

==== Qualified roles and capabilities ====
- Transport aircraft (strategic and tactical), capable to land on short runways and unprepared airstrips.
- Medical evacuation.
- Air-to-air refuelling for other aircraft and helicopters (up to 51 tons of fuel).
- Aerial delivery (paratroopers, airdrops of vehicles and humanitarian aid)

==== Roles and capabilities in development ====
- Firefighting (some demonstration flights and missions have been successfully performed), the development focuses on a roll-on / roll-off kit.
- Standoff jammer: an offensive electronic warfare variant is considered especially by Germany, under the luWES programme. This variant would require structural changes to integrate the antennas. The mission stations would be designed under the roll-on/roll-off concept, and the aircraft would maintain the other capabilities if needed.
- Mothership: development of the capability to deploy up to 12 Taurus-sized missiles or 50 UAV from pallets inside the cargo bay.

In June 2026, France became the launch customer for the A400M Parallel Mission System (PMS) upgrade. Under a contract awarded by OCCAR on behalf of the French Directorate General of Armaments (DGA), Airbus is developing a modular open mission system designed to expand the A400M's multi-mission capabilities, with an initial focus on intelligence, surveillance, and reconnaissance (ISR) roles. The PMS includes roll-on/roll-off tactical mission consoles installed in the cargo hold, integration of an optronic sensor, and an open-architecture mission system that will support additional sensors, communications systems, effectors, and the integration of uncrewed systems. Installation of the first upgraded aircraft is planned for 2027, with flight testing scheduled for 2028 and Initial operational capability (IOC) expected by the end of the decade. The programme forms the first phase of Airbus's broader A400M multi-mission roadmap, which also envisages enhanced communications and command-and-control functions, collaborative combat capabilities, increased payload capacity, and roll-on/roll-off firefighting kits.

== Operational history ==
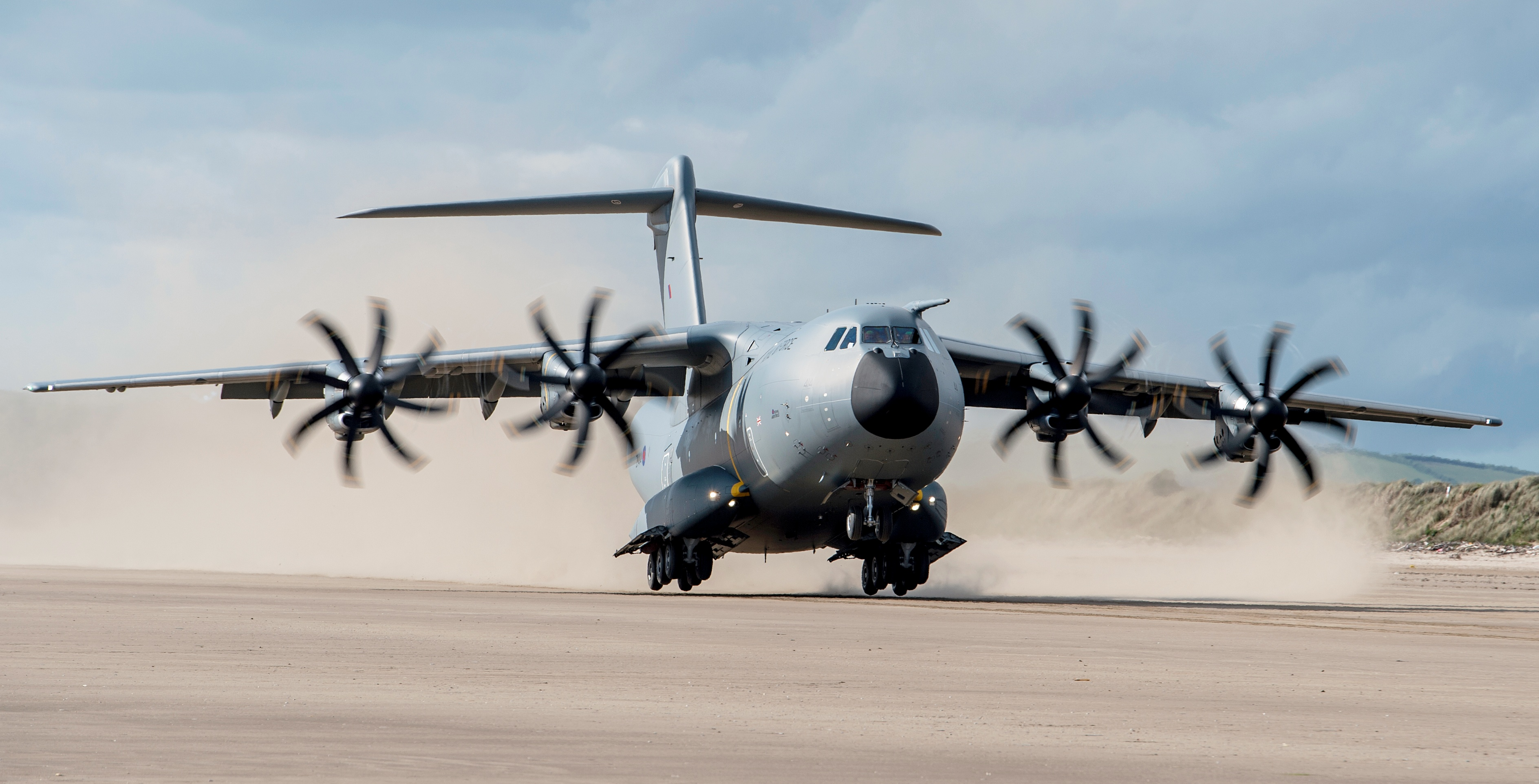
An RAF A400M Atlas takes off from a beach at Pembrey Sands, South Wales in May 2017.

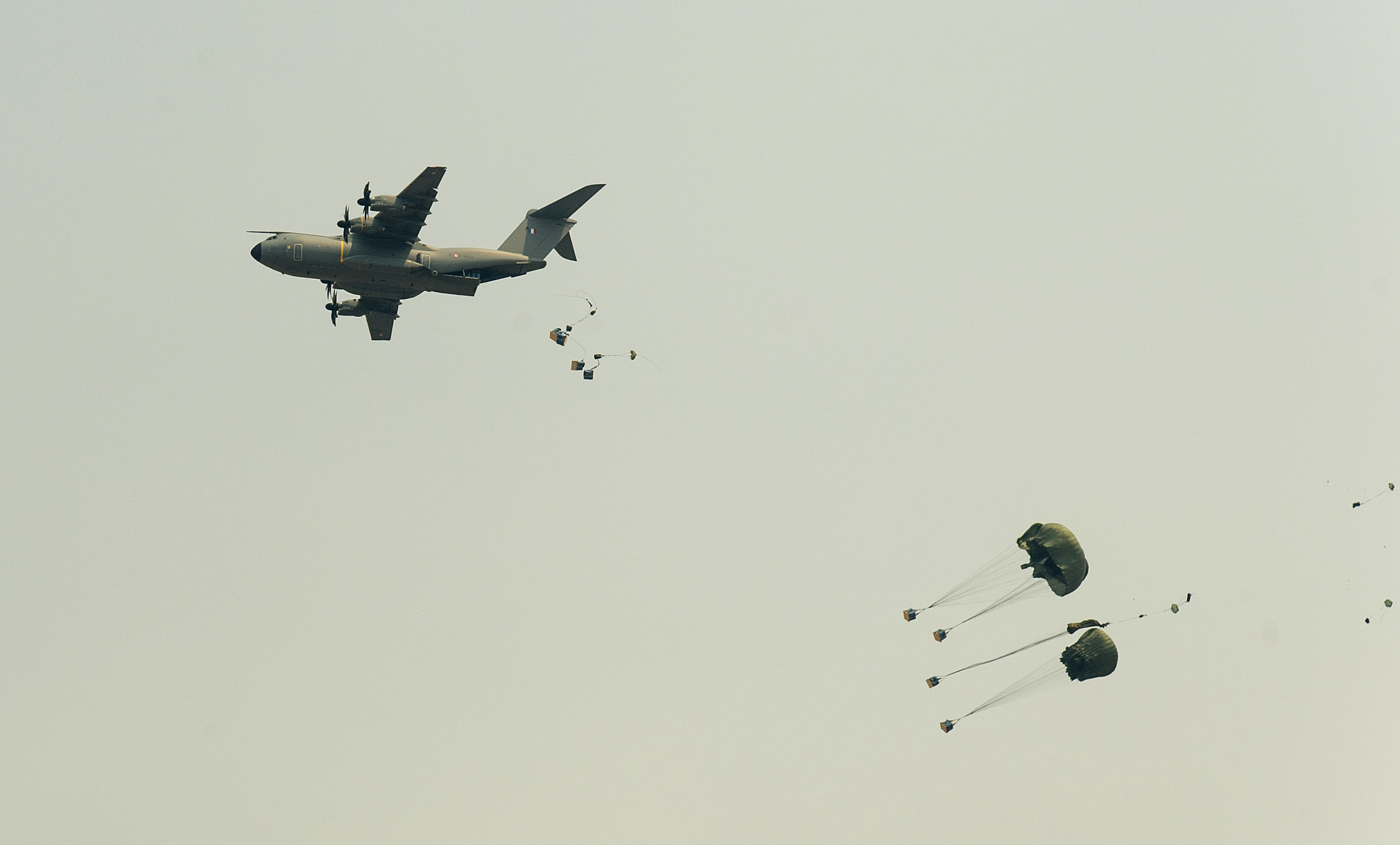
A French A400M performs airdrops during Exercise Mobility Guardian 2017.

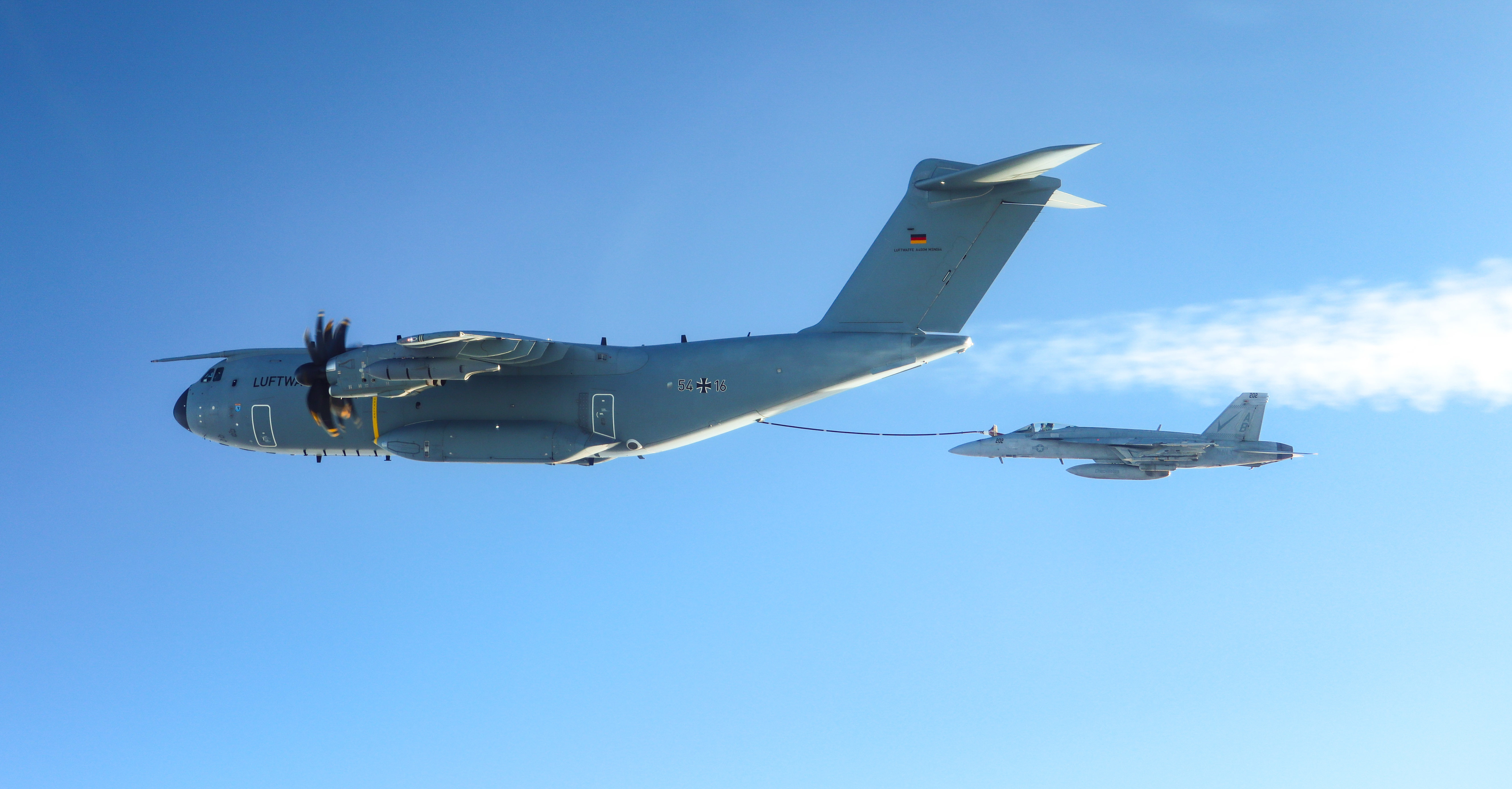
A German A400M refuels a US Navy F/A-18E Super Hornet patrolling NATO airspace during the 2022 Russian invasion of Ukraine.

On 29 December 2013, the French Air Force performed the A400M's first operational mission: an aircraft flew to Mali in support of Operation Serval.

On 10 September 2015, the RAF was declared the A400M fleet leader in terms of flying hours, with 900 hours flown over 300 sorties, achieved by a fleet of four aircraft. Sqn. Ldr. Glen Willcox of the RAF's Heavy Aircraft Test Squadron confirmed that reliability levels were high for an aircraft so early in its career, and that night vision goggle trials, hot and cold soaking, noise characterisation tests and the first tie-down schemes for cargo had already been completed. In March 2015, the RAF's first operational mission occurred, flying cargo to RAF Akrotiri, Cyprus.

In September and October 2017, A400Ms from France, Germany and the UK participated in disaster relief operations following Hurricane Irma in the Caribbean, delivering a Puma helicopter, food, water and other aid supplies, and evacuating stranded people.

In July 2018, the German Luftwaffe used an A400M in combat conditions for the first time, transporting 75 soldiers from Wunstorf Air Base to Mazar-i-Sharif, Afghanistan. German Air Force Inspector Ingo Gerhartz called this a "milestone" because it was the first such mission in an active war zone and showed that the armouring kit was fully functional.

In September 2018, the French Air and Space Force announced that they had logged 10,000 flying hours with their fleet of 14 A400Ms, mostly flying supply missions for Operation Barkhane.

The German government had planned to sell the last 13 A400Ms out of its order of 53 aircraft but failed to attract any buyers. In 2017, the German parliament decided to employ them in service at Wunstorf in northern Germany instead. In January 2019, German Minister of Defence Ursula von der Leyen announced that 10 A400Ms were to be used to form a multinational airlift wing based at Lechfeld Air Base in southern Germany. The plan was abandoned in 2022 due to a lack of interest from potential partner nations.

In 2019, a German A400M tanker replaced the Airbus A310 MRTT deployed to Muwaffaq Salti Air Base in Jordan, to refuel allied aircraft as part of the German intervention against ISIL.

In August 2021, a total of 25 A400Ms were deployed by Belgium, France, Germany, Spain, Turkey and the UK to assist in the Kabul Airport evacuations. German A400Ms evacuated 5,347 people over the course of 35 flights.

In September 2023, Royal Air Force A400M transported British search and rescue teams to Morocco after a M_{w} 6.9 earthquake had ravaged the country.

In October 2024, the German Air Force tested the A400M's "mixed airdrop" capability at Scheuen drop zone at Air Base Celle, combining personnel and cargo drops from 400 meters at 220 km/h in different configurations. Overseen by BAAINBw, the trials built on earlier NATO-standard CDS pallet trials conducted during Grafenwöhr exercises in 2020 and confirmed the A400M's ability to deploy up to 4 metric tons of cargo and 108 paratroopers in a single sortie. Final military certification depends on further trials and data analysis, while Airbus certification has been granted.

On 9 May 2026, a Royal Air Force A400M dropped a specialist UK military team that executed a first-of-its-kind emergency humanitarian mission, parachuting onto Tristan da Cunha, an archipelago in the South Atlantic Ocean considered to be among the world's most remote islands. The team was sent to treat a British national with suspected hantavirus; he was a local island resident who disembarked from the virus-hit cruise ship MV Hondius. Oxygen supplies at the island's hospital had reached a critical level. The territory normally operates with just a two-person medical team. Six paratroopers and two military clinicians from the 16 Air Assault Brigade launched the mission. Because of the specialised medical care required, an intensive care nurse and an intensive care doctor were strapped to paratroopers for tandem jumps. The team flew 6,788 km from RAF Brize Norton to Ascension Island. They then flew over 3,000 km to the drop zone, supported by mid-air refuelling from an RAF Voyager. Medics battled winds exceeding 25 mph to land safely on the island's rocky golf course. Simultaneously, an RAF A400M air-dropped 3.3 tonnes of vital medical aid and oxygen.

In July 2026, a French Air and Space Force A400M was deployed as a firefighting platform to combat wildfires in France. The aircraft used a roll-on/roll-off firefighting kit from Airbus.

== Variants ==
A400M Grizzly
Five prototype and development aircraft; a sixth aircraft was cancelled.
A400M-180 Atlas
Production variant

== Sales ==
A400M operators as of July 2022 Current operators Aircraft ordered

=== Current operators ===
Country	Order date	Orders	Deliveries	Date of service entry	Notes
European clients
Belgium	27 May 2003	7	7	December 2020	Last delivered in January 2024.
France	27 May 2003	50	26	August 2013	Last delivered in 2026, seven planned in 2027.
Germany	27 May 2003	53	53	December 2014	Order reduced from 60 to 53, with an option for 7 aircraft. Last aircraft delivered in April 2026.
Luxembourg	27 May 2003	1	1	October 2020	Stationed in Belgium as a part of a bi-national fleet.
Spain	27 May 2003	27	14	November 2016	Original budget of €3.453 billion increased to €5.493 billion in 2010. The delivery of 13 aircraft was delayed to 2025–2030.
Turkey	27 May 2003	10	10	April 2014	
United Kingdom	27 May 2003	22	22	November 2014	Initial order reduced from 25 to 22. Additional aircraft planned to be purchased in the late 2020s.
Asian clients
Indonesia	18 Nov 2021	2	2	November 2025	Two A400Ms in MRTT configuration were ordered. A letter of intent contains options for four additional aircraft. The first A400M MRTT was delivered on 3 November 2025.
Kazakhstan	1 Sep 2021	2	2	December 2024	
Malaysia	8 Dec 2005	4	4	March 2015	First non-NATO country to purchase the A400M. Final A400M delivered in March 2017.
Total		178	140		

As of October 2026

=== Export ===
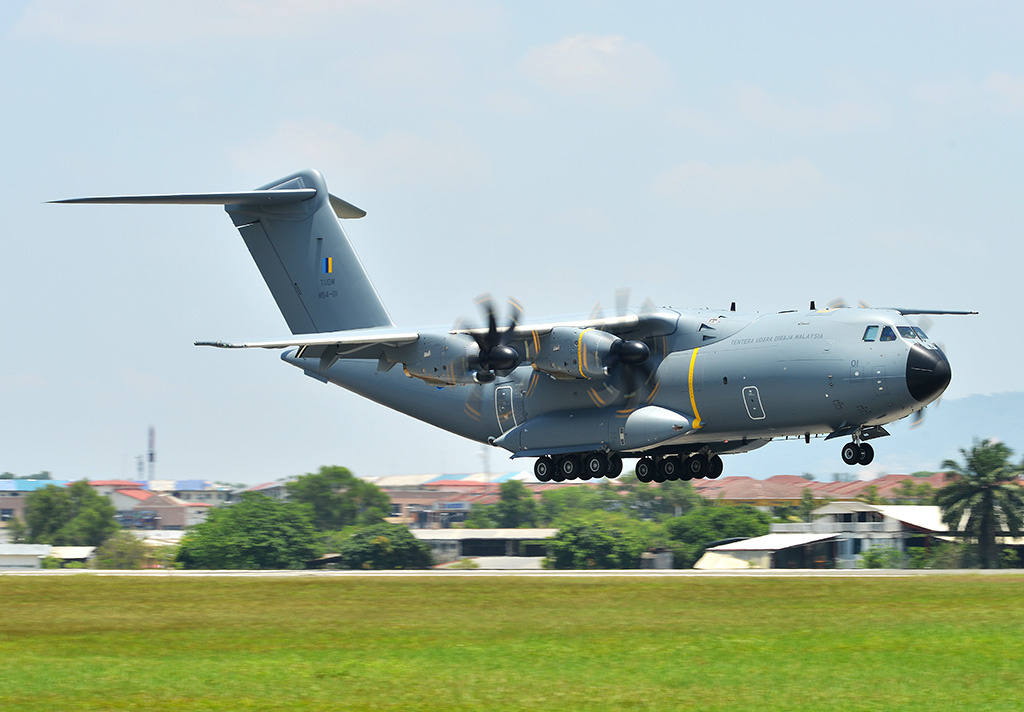
Royal Malaysian Air Force A400M

Indonesia
In January 2017, Indonesia approved the acquisition of five A400Ms to boost its military airlift capabilities. In March 2017, Pelita Air Services, representing a consortium of Indonesian aviation companies, signed a letter of intent with Airbus. In March 2018, the Indonesian Air Force and Indonesia Trading Company (ITC) considered ordering two A400Ms for air freight use across the archipelago, citing the aircraft's ability to operate from rough strips and potential industrial offsets.
In November 2021, Airbus confirmed the Indonesian Ministry of Defense had signed a deal for two A400Ms, with a letter of intent option for four more. The contract was finalised in December 2022.
The first aircraft was delivered in November 2025 and the second in March 2026. In November 2025, President Prabowo Subianto announced the government was considering procuring four additional A400Ms.
Kazakhstan
In September 2021, Kazakhstan signed an agreement with Airbus to buy two A400Ms for the Kazakh Air Defense Forces. On 5 April 2024, the first aircraft was rolled out at the A400M Final Assembly building in Seville. It was expected to be delivered to Kazakhstan before 2025.
Malaysia
In December 2005, the Royal Malaysian Air Force ordered four A400Ms to supplement its fleet of C-130 Hercules.

=== Potential sales ===
Denmark (4 to 5)
The Danish Air force might order 4 or 5 A400M as of October 2026.
France (6)
France is planning to purchase additional aircraft as part of the military programming law 2024-2030.
Germany (16)
Germany is planning to purchase 16 A400M, as of September 2026. These would likely replace the first 16 A400M received by Germany that lack tactical capabilities.: This sale would extend to production until 2032.: The purchase was approved the 13 November 2026, but no contract has been signed yet.
Greece
Airbus is discussing potential sales of the A400M with Greece.
India (60)
As part of the MTA (Medium Transport Aircraft) programme, India is looking for up to 60 transport aircraft to replace the An-32. Airbus is competing with Embraer and its C-390 Millenium, and Lockheed Martin and the C-130J Super Hercules.
Indonesia (4)
As of 2026, Indonesia might order 4 additional A400M.
Italy
Airbus is discussing potential sales of the A400M with Italy.
Poland (12)
Poland is planning to purchase between 8 and 15 aircraft that would be financed by the EU SAFE funds, the most likely number being 12 aircraft.
Portugal
Airbus is discussing potential sales of the A400M with Portugal.
Saudi Arabia (15 to 20)
A 40-ton capacity A400M variant was pitched to Saudi Arabia in 2026.
United Arab Emirates (8 to 10)
Airbus is discussing with the UAE to sell the A400M.

=== Cancelled sales ===
South Africa
In December 2004, South Africa announced it would purchase eight A400Ms at a cost of approximately €837 million, with the nation joining the Airbus Military team as an industrial partner. Deliveries were expected from 2010 to 2012. In 2009, South Africa cancelled all eight aircraft, citing increasing costs. In November 2011, Airbus Military reached an agreement to refund pre-delivery payments worth €837 million to Armscor.

=== Failed bids ===
Chile
In July 2005, the Chilean Air Force signed a Memorandum of understanding for three aircraft, but no order was placed. Chile began talks on buying the Brazilian Embraer KC-390.
Czech Republic
In February 2017, the Czech Ministries of Defence stated they were interested in a joint lease of A400Ms from Germany. The plan was cancelled with the purchase of C-390M.
Hungary
In September 2020, Hungary was named the first partner of the Multinational Air Transport Unit to be established at Lechfeld Air Base, with 10 A400Ms contracted to Germany, a plan that was dropped in 2022.
South Korea
In February 2019, South Korea's Defense Acquisition Program Administration (DAPA) confirmed a proposal from Spain to swap an undetermined number of KAI T-50 Golden Eagles and KAI KT-1 Woongbi trainers for A400M airlifters.: South Korea selected the Embraer C-390M in a bid process.

== Accidents ==
=== Seville 2015 crash ===
An A400M crashed on 9 May 2015, when aircraft MSN23, on its first test flight crashed shortly after take-off from San Pablo Airport in Seville, Spain, killing four Spanish Airbus crew and seriously injuring two others. Once airborne, the crew contacted air traffic controllers just before the crash about a technical failure, before colliding with an electricity pylon while attempting an emergency landing.

The crash was attributed to the FADEC system being unable to read engine sensors properly due to an accidental file-wipe, resulting in three of its four engines remaining in "idle" mode during takeoff.

== Controversies ==
=== Export Control breaches ===
In July 2026, Airbus announced that it had paid a fine of £6.4 million to UK revenue and ‌customs authorities to settle a two-year-old investigation into export control violations. The investigation focused on anomalies over the cross-border transfer of parts for the A400M military airlifter that came to light during an audit in 2022.

According to HMRC sources, the breaches included:

- Failing to keep accurate records of transfers of controlled technology as per the conditions of three of their open general export licences (OGELs)
- Failing to keep registers in relation to OGELs
- Failing to keep accurate records contrary to the conditions of one of their OGELs
- A failure of licence conditions on a standard individual export licence (SIEL)

== Specifications ==
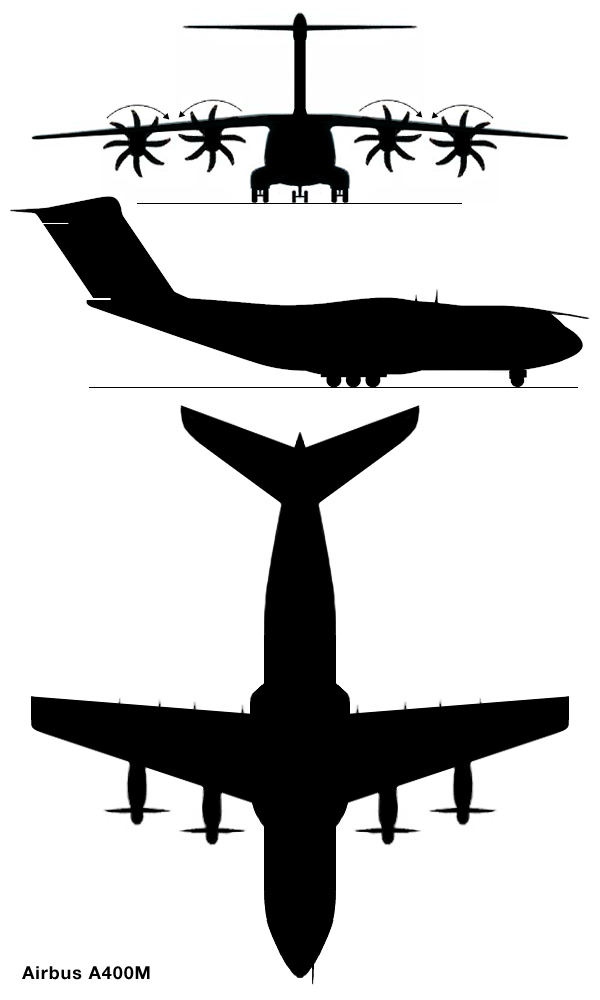
Airbus A400M silhouettes

The operational range of an A400M with 20-tonne (44,000 lb) and 30-tonne (66,000 lb) payloads, flown from Paris, France

Data from Airbus Defence & Space specifications

General characteristics

- Crew: 3 or 4 (2 pilots, 3rd optional, 1 loadmaster)
- Capacity: 37,000 kg (81,600 lb)
  - 116 fully equipped troops / paratroopers
  - up to 66 stretchers accompanied by 25 medical personnel
  - cargo compartment: width 4.00 m (13.12 ft) x height 3.85 m (12.6 ft) x length 17.71 m (58.1 ft) (without ramp 5.40 m (17.7 ft))
- Length: 45.1 m (148 ft 0 in)
- Wingspan: 42.4 m (139 ft 1 in)
- Height: 14.7 m (48 ft 3 in)
- Wing area: 225.1 m^{2} (2,384 sq ft)
- Empty weight: 78,600 kg (173,283 lb)
- Max takeoff weight: 141,000 kg (310,852 lb)
- Fuel capacity: 50,500 kg (111,300 lb) internal fuel
- Max landing weight: 123,000 kg (271,000 lb)
- Powerplant: 4 × Europrop TP400-D6 turboprop, 8,200 kW (11,000 hp) each
- Propellers: 8-bladed Ratier-Figeac variable pitch propellers with feathering and reversing capability (Note: FH385 anticlockwise on engines 2 and 4, FH386 clockwise on engines 1 and 3)), 5.3 m (17 ft 5 in) diameter

Performance

- Maximum speed: Mach 0.72
- Cruise speed: 781 km/h (485 mph, 422 kn) at 9,450 m (31,000 ft)
- Initial cruise altitude: 9,000 m (29,000 ft) at MTOW
- Range: 3,300 km (2,100 mi, 1,800 nmi) at max payload (Note: long range cruise speed; reserves as per MIL-C-5011A))
  - Range with 30-tonne payload: 4,500 km (2,450 nmi)
  - Range with 20-tonne payload: 6,400 km (3,450 nmi)
- Ferry range: 8,700 km (5,400 mi, 4,700 nmi)
- Service ceiling: 12,200 m (40,000 ft)
- Wing loading: 637 kg/m^{2} (130.4 lb/sq ft)
- Tactical takeoff distance: 980 m (3,215 ft) (Note: aircraft weight 100 tonnes (98 long tons; 110 short tons), soft field, ISA, sea level)
- Tactical landing distance: 770 m (2,530 ft)
- Turning radius (ground): 28.6 m

== See also ==
Aircraft of comparable role, configuration, and era

- Antonov An-70 – Ukrainian/Russian military transport aircraft prototype by Antonov
- Embraer C-390 Millennium – Brazilian military transport aircraft/tanker
- Ilyushin Il-76 – Russian heavy four-engined military transport jet aircraft
- Kawasaki C-2 – Japanese military transport aircraft
- Lockheed Martin C-130J Super Hercules – Military transport aircraft
- Shaanxi Y-30 – Chinese medium military transport aircraft – Chinese military transport aircraft in development
- Xi'an Y-20 – Chinese military transport aircraft

Related lists

- List of tanker aircraft
