= Lockheed P-3 Orion =

Maritime patrol and anti-submarine aircraft family

P-3 Orion
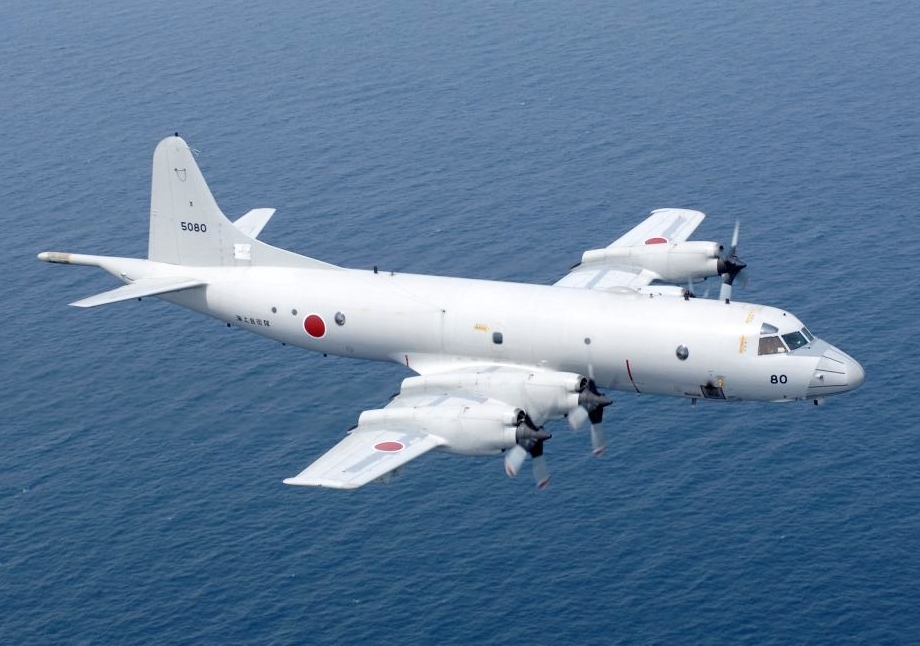
- A Kawasaki-built P-3C Orion of the Japan Maritime Self-Defense Force

General information
- Type: Maritime patrol aircraft
- National origin: United States
- Manufacturer: Lockheed; Lockheed Martin; Kawasaki Aerospace Company
- Status: Active
- Primary users: United States Navy Republic of China Navy; Japan Maritime Self-Defense Force; Republic of Korea Navy
- Number built: Lockheed – 650, Kawasaki – 107, Total – 757

History
- Manufactured: 1961–1990
- Introduction date: August 1962
- First flight: November 1959
- Developed from: Lockheed L-188 Electra
- Variants: Lockheed AP-3C Orion; Lockheed CP-140 Aurora; Lockheed EP-3; Lockheed WP-3D Orion
- Developed into: Lockheed P-7

The Lockheed P-3 Orion is a four-engined, turboprop anti-submarine and maritime surveillance aircraft developed for the United States Navy and introduced in the 1960s. It is based on the L-188 Electra commercial airliner by Lockheed; it is easily distinguished from the Electra by its distinctive tail stinger or "MAD" boom, used for the magnetic anomaly detection (MAD) of submarines.

Over the years, the P-3 has seen numerous design developments, most notably in its electronics packages. Numerous navies and air forces around the world continue to use the type primarily for maritime patrol, reconnaissance, anti-surface warfare and anti-submarine warfare. A total of 757 P-3s have been built. In 2012, it joined the handful of military aircraft including the Boeing/Vertol CH-47, Boeing B-52 Stratofortress, Boeing KC-135 Stratotanker, and Lockheed C-130 Hercules that the United States military has been using for more than 50 years. In the twenty-first century, the turbofan-powered Boeing P-8 Poseidon began to supplement, and will eventually replace, the U.S. Navy's P-3s.

== Development ==
=== Origins ===
In August 1957, the U.S. Navy called for proposals for replacement of the piston-engined Lockheed P2V Neptune (later redesignated P-2) and Martin P5M Marlin (later redesignated P-5) with a more advanced aircraft to conduct maritime patrol and antisubmarine warfare. Modifying an existing aircraft should save on cost and to allow rapid introduction into the fleet. Lockheed suggested a military version of its L-188 Electra, then still in development and yet to fly. In April 1958, Lockheed won the competition and was awarded an initial research-and-development contract in May.

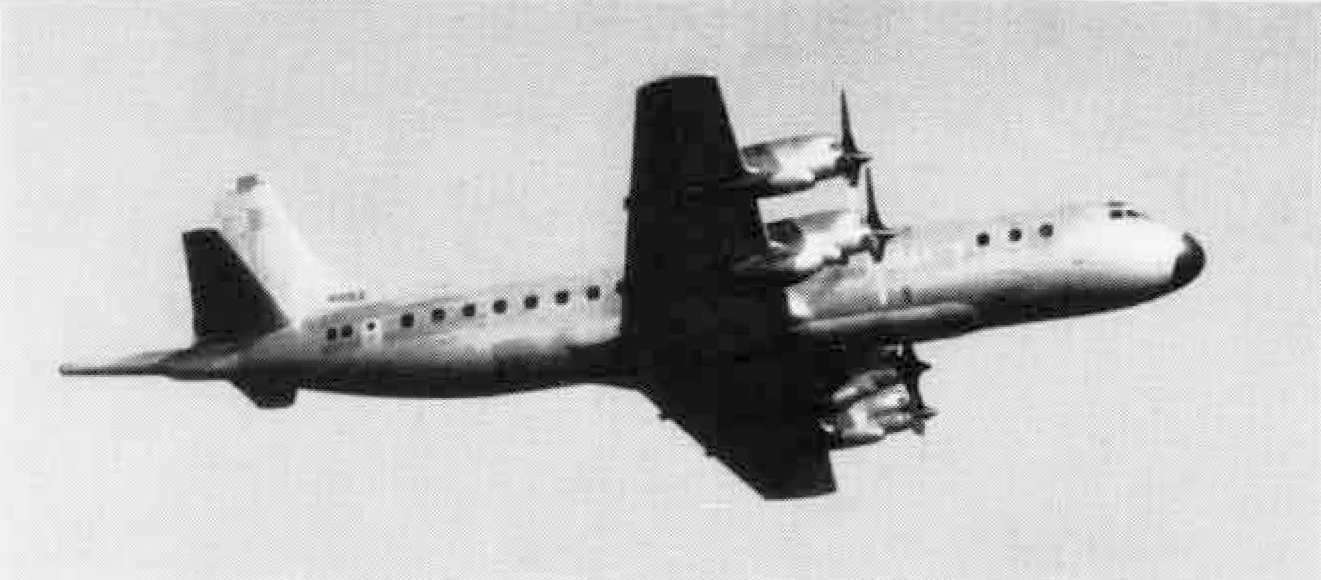
The first Orion prototype was a converted Lockheed Electra.

Lockheed modified the prototype YP3V-1/YP-3A, Bureau Number (BuNo) 148276 from the third Electra airframe c/n 1003. The first flight of the aircraft's aerodynamic prototype, originally designated YP3V-1, took place on 19 August 1958. While based on the same design philosophy as the Electra, the aircraft differed structurally; it had 7 feet (2.1 m) less fuselage forward of the wings with an opening bomb bay, and a more pointed nose radome, a distinctive tail "stinger" for detection of submarines by MAD, wing hardpoints, and other internal, external, and airframe-production technique enhancements.

The Orion has four Allison T56 turboprops, which give it a top speed of 411 knots (761 km/h; 473 mph) comparable to the fastest propeller fighters, or even to slow high-bypass turbofan jets such as the Fairchild Republic A-10 Thunderbolt II or the Lockheed S-3 Viking. Similar patrol aircraft include the Soviet Ilyushin Il-38, the French Breguet Atlantique and the British jet-powered Hawker Siddeley Nimrod (based on the de Havilland Comet).

The first production version, designated P3V-1, was launched on 15 April 1961. Initial squadron deliveries to Patrol Squadron Eight (VP-8) and Patrol Squadron Forty-Four (VP-44) at Naval Air Station Patuxent River, Maryland, began in August 1962. On 18 September 1962, the U.S. military transitioned to a unified designation system for all services, with the aircraft being renamed the P-3 Orion. Paint schemes have changed from early 1960s, gloss seaplane gray and white to mid-1960s/1970s/1980s/early 1990s gloss white and gray, to mid-1990s flat-finish low-visibility gray with fewer and smaller markings. In the early 2000s, the paint scheme changed to its current overall gloss gray finish with the original full-sized color markings. However, large-sized BuNos on the vertical stabilizer and squadron designations on the fuselage remained largely omitted.

=== Further developments ===
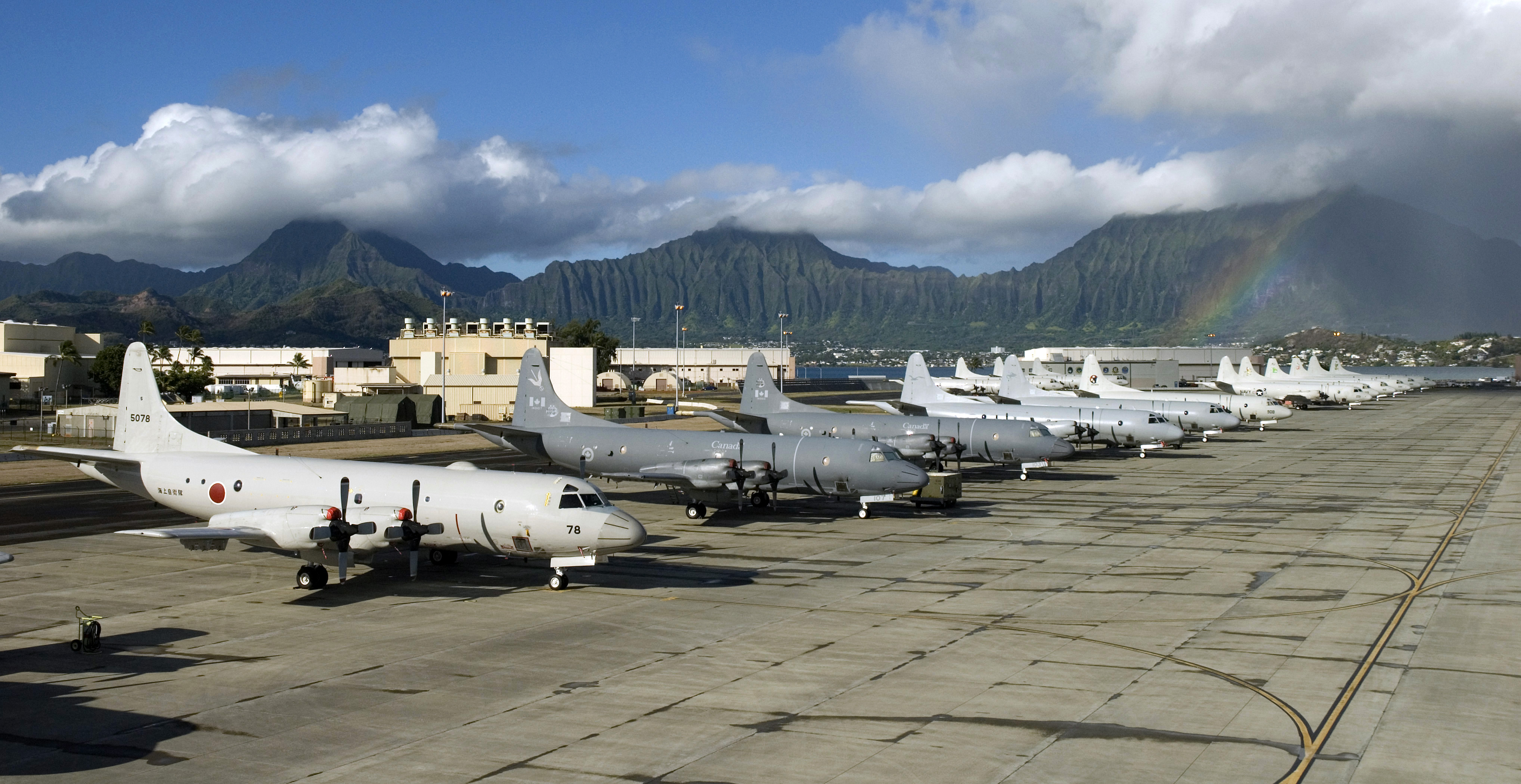
P-3s from Japan, Canada, Australia, Republic of Korea, and the United States at MCAS Kaneohe Bay during RIMPAC 2010

In 1963, the U.S. Navy's Bureau of Naval Weapons contracted Univac Defense Systems Division of Sperry Rand to engineer, build, and test a digital computer (a device then in its infancy) to interface with the many sensors and newly developing display units of the P-3 Orion. Project A-NEW was the engineering system, which after several early trials, produced the engineering prototype, the CP-823/U, UNIVAC 1830, Serial A-1, A-NEW MOD3 Computing System. Univac delivered the CP-823/U to the Naval Air Development Center at Johnsville, Pennsylvania, in 1965; this directly led to the production computers later equipped on the P-3C.

Three civilian Electras were lost in fatal accidents between February 1959 and March 1960. Following the third crash, the FAA restricted the maximum speed of Electras pending determination of the causes. After an extensive investigation, two of the crashes (those of September 1959 and March 1960) were identified as due to insufficiently strong engine mounts, unable to damp a whirling motion that could affect the outboard engines. When the oscillation was transmitted to the wings, a severe vertical vibration escalated, tearing off the wings. The company implemented a costly modification program, labelled the Lockheed Electra Achievement Program, which strengthened the engine mounts and the wing structures supporting the mounts, and replaced some wing skins with thicker material. At its own expense, Lockheed modified all surviving Electras of the 145 built at that time, the process taking 20 days for each aircraft. These changes were incorporated into subsequent aircraft as they were built.

The Electra's sales were limited as Lockheed's technical fix did not completely erase the aircraft's poor reputation in an era in which turboprop-powered aircraft were being replaced by faster jets. In military roles that valued fuel efficiency more than speed, the Orion remained in service for over 50 years after its 1962 introduction. Although surpassed in production longevity by the Lockheed C-130 Hercules, 734 P-3s were produced through 1990. Lockheed Martin opened a new P-3 wing production-line in 2008 as part of its Service Life Extension Program (ASLEP) for delivery in 2010. A complete ASLEP replaces the outer wings, center-wing lower section, and horizontal stabilizers with newly built parts.

In the 1990s, the U.S. Navy attempted to procure a successor aircraft to the P-3, and selected the improved P-7 over a naval-specific variant of the twin turbofan-powered Boeing 757, but this program was subsequently cancelled. In a second program to select a replacement, the advanced Lockheed Martin Orion 21, another P-3-derived aircraft, lost out to the Boeing P-8 Poseidon, a Boeing 737 variant, which entered service in 2013.

== Design ==
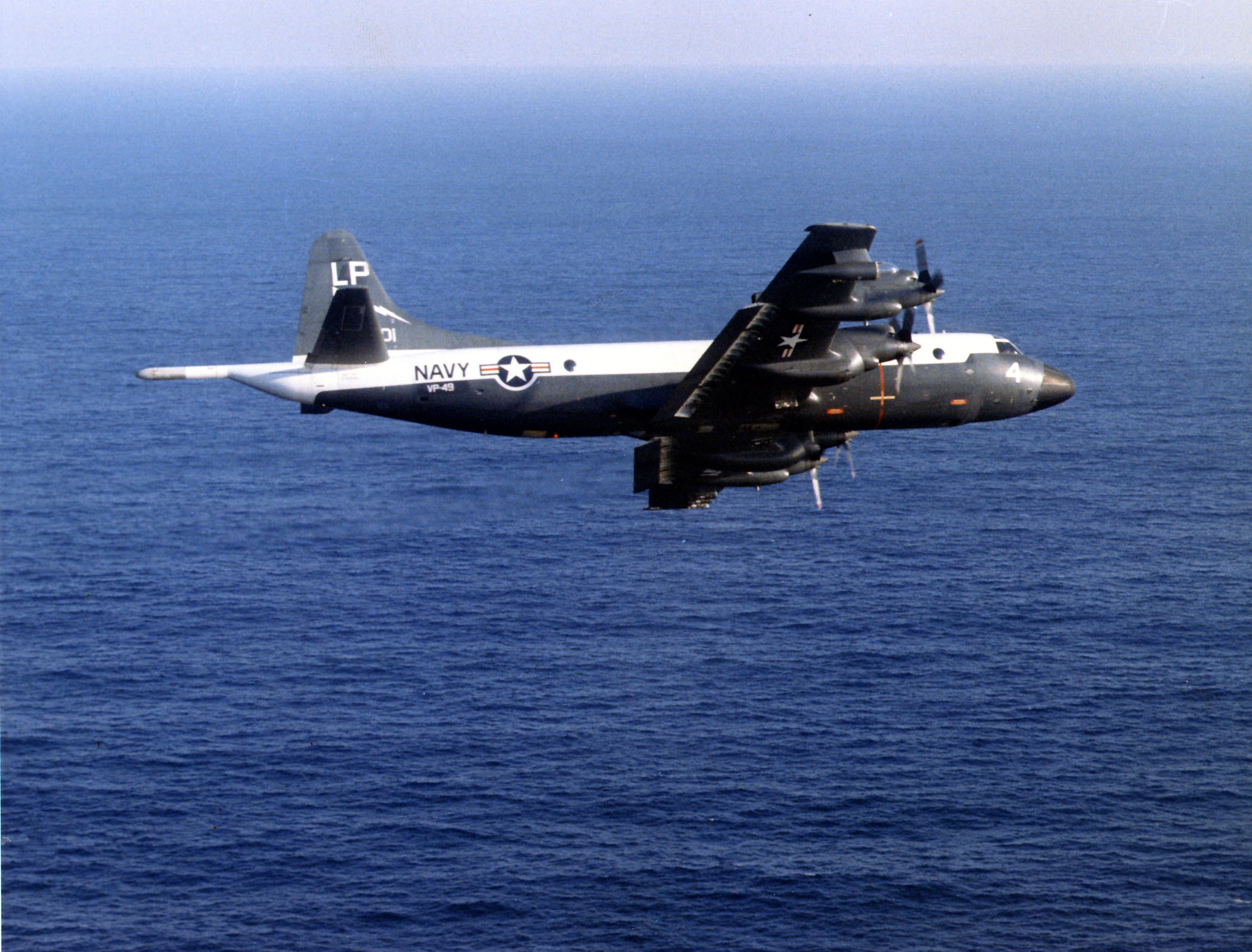
A USN P-3A of VP-49 in the original blue/white colors

The P-3 has an internal bomb bay under the front fuselage, which can house conventional Mark 50 torpedoes or Mark 46 torpedoes and/or special (nuclear) weapons. Additional underwing stations, or pylons, can carry other armament configurations, including the AGM-84 Harpoon, AGM-84E SLAM, AGM-84H/K SLAM-ER, AGM-65 Maverick, 5-inch (127 mm) Zuni rockets, and various other sea mines, missiles, and gravity bombs. The aircraft also had the capability to carry the AGM-12 Bullpup guided missile until that weapon was withdrawn from service.

The P-3 is equipped with a MAD in the extended tail. This instrument is able to detect the magnetic anomaly of a submarine in the Earth's magnetic field. The limited range of this instrument requires the aircraft to be near the submarine at low altitude. Because of this, it is primarily used for pinpointing the location of a submarine immediately prior to a torpedo or depth bomb attack. Due to the sensitivity of the detector, electromagnetic noise can interfere with it, so the detector is placed in P-3's fiberglass tail stinger (MAD boom), far from other electronics and ferrous metals on the aircraft.

=== Crew complement ===
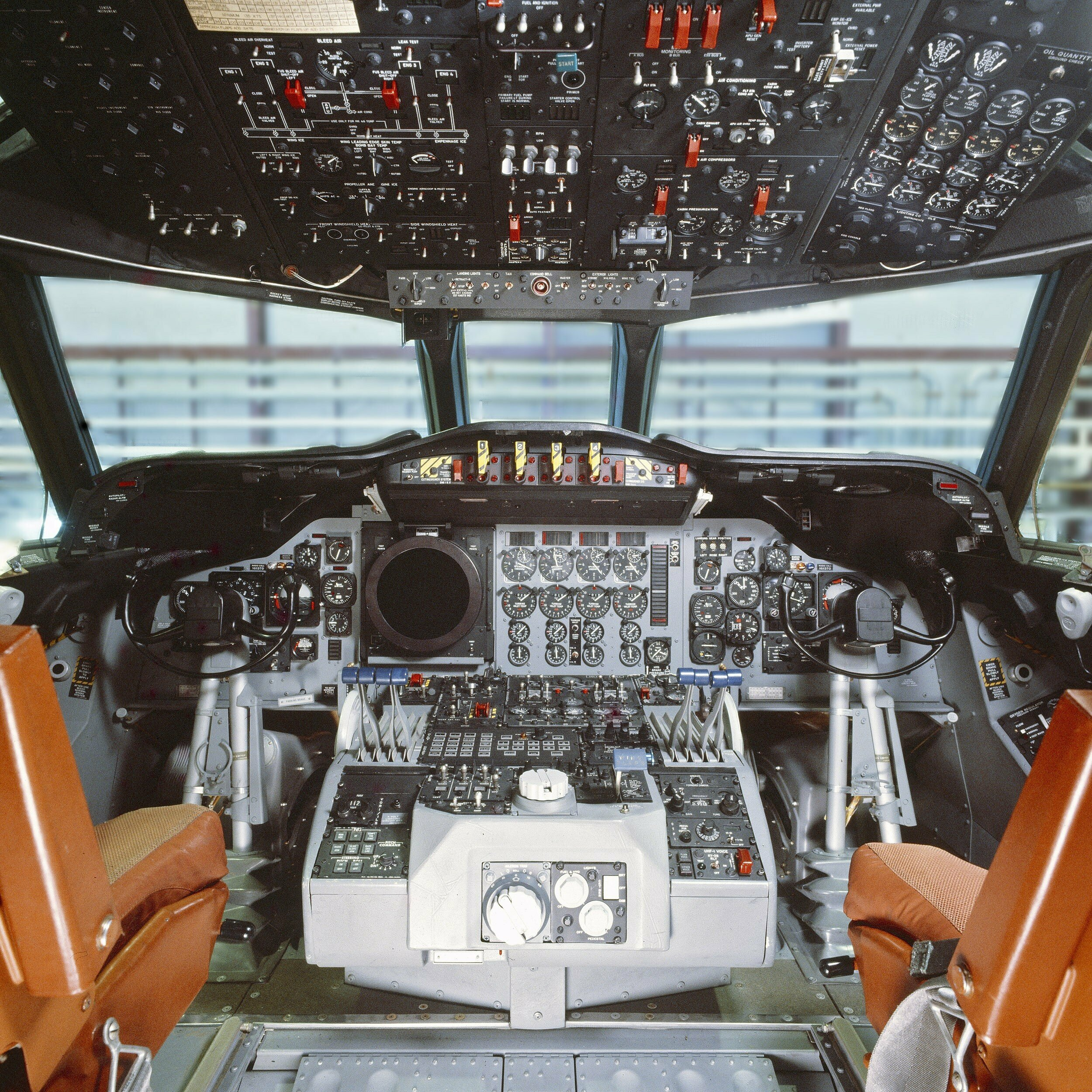
Flight instruments and controls in the cockpit of the P-3C Orion (Update II) in Dutch service.

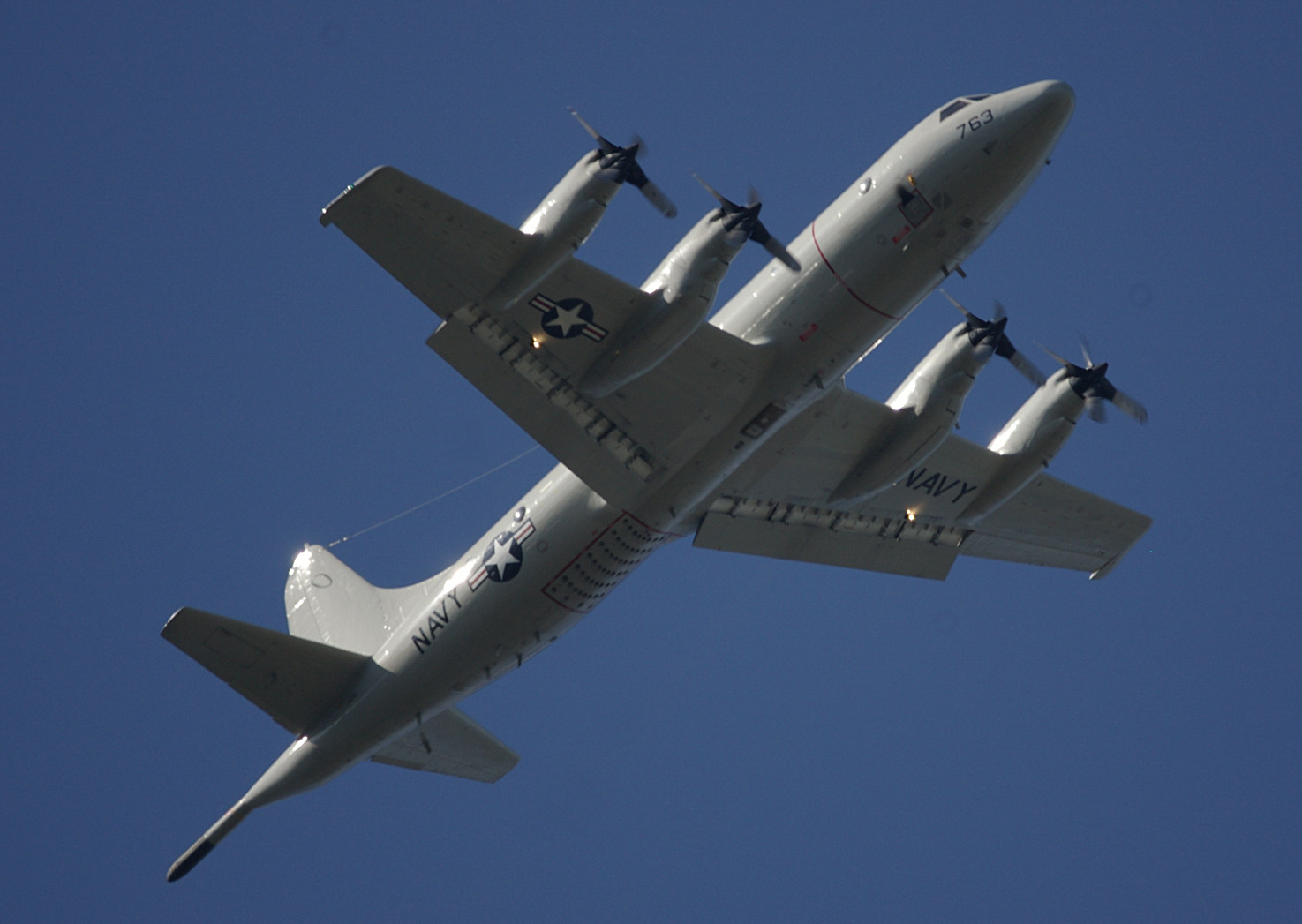
An underside view of a USN P-3C showing the MAD (rear boom) and external sonobuoy launch tubes (grid of black spots towards the rear)

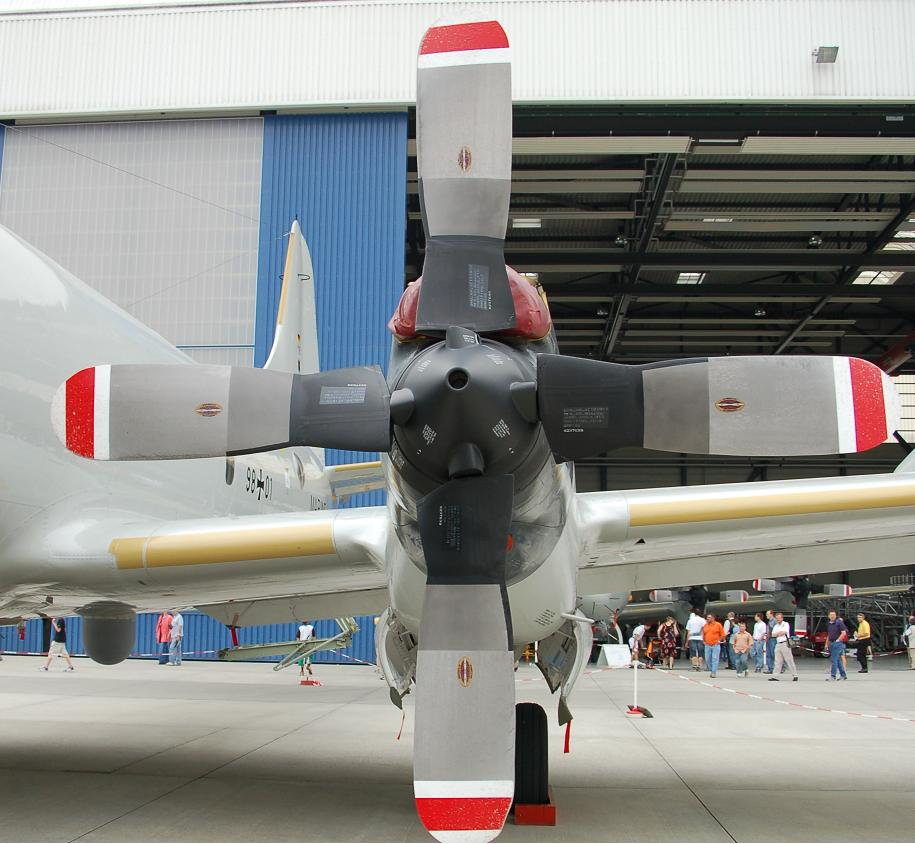
A German Navy Rolls-Royce Allison T56-A-14 engine with Hamilton Standard 54H60-77 propeller

The crew complement varies depending on the role being flown, the variant being operated, and the country that is operating the type. In U.S. Navy service, the normal crew complement was 12 until it was reduced to its current complement of 11 in the early 2000s when the in-flight ordnanceman position was eliminated as a cost-savings measure and the ORD duties assumed by the in-flight technician. Data for U.S. Navy P-3C only.

Officers:

- three Naval Aviators
  - Patrol Plane Commander (PPC)
  - Patrol Plane 2nd Pilot (PP2P)
  - Patrol Plane 3rd Pilot (PP3P)
- two Naval Flight Officers
  - Patrol Plane Tactical Coordinator (PPTC or TACCO)
  - Patrol Plane Navigator/Communicator (PPNC or NAVCOM)

NOTE: NAVCOM on P-3C only; USN P-3A and P-3B series had an NFO Navigator (TACNAV) and an enlisted Airborne Radio Operator (RO)

Enlisted aircrew:

- two enlisted Aircrew Flight Engineers (FE1 and FE2)
- three enlisted Sensor Operators
  - Radar/MAD/EWO (SS-3)
  - two Acoustic (SS-1 and SS-2)
- one enlisted In-Flight Technician (IFT)
- one enlisted Aviation Ordnanceman (ORD position no longer used on USN crews; duties assumed by IFT)

The senior of either the PPC or TACCO will be designated as the aircraft Mission Commander (MC).

=== Engine loiter shutdown ===
Once on station, one engine is often shut down (usually the No. 1 engine – the left outer engine) to conserve fuel and extend the time aloft and/or range when at low level. It is the primary candidate for loiter shutdown because it has no generator. Eliminating the exhaust from engine 1 also improves visibility from the aft observer station on the left side of the aircraft.

On occasion, both outboard engines can be shut down, weight, weather, and fuel permitting. Long, deep-water, coastal, or border-patrol missions can last over 10 hours and may include extra crew. The record time aloft for a P-3 is 21.5 hours, undertaken by the Royal New Zealand Air Force's No. 5 Squadron in 1972.

== Operational history ==
=== United States ===
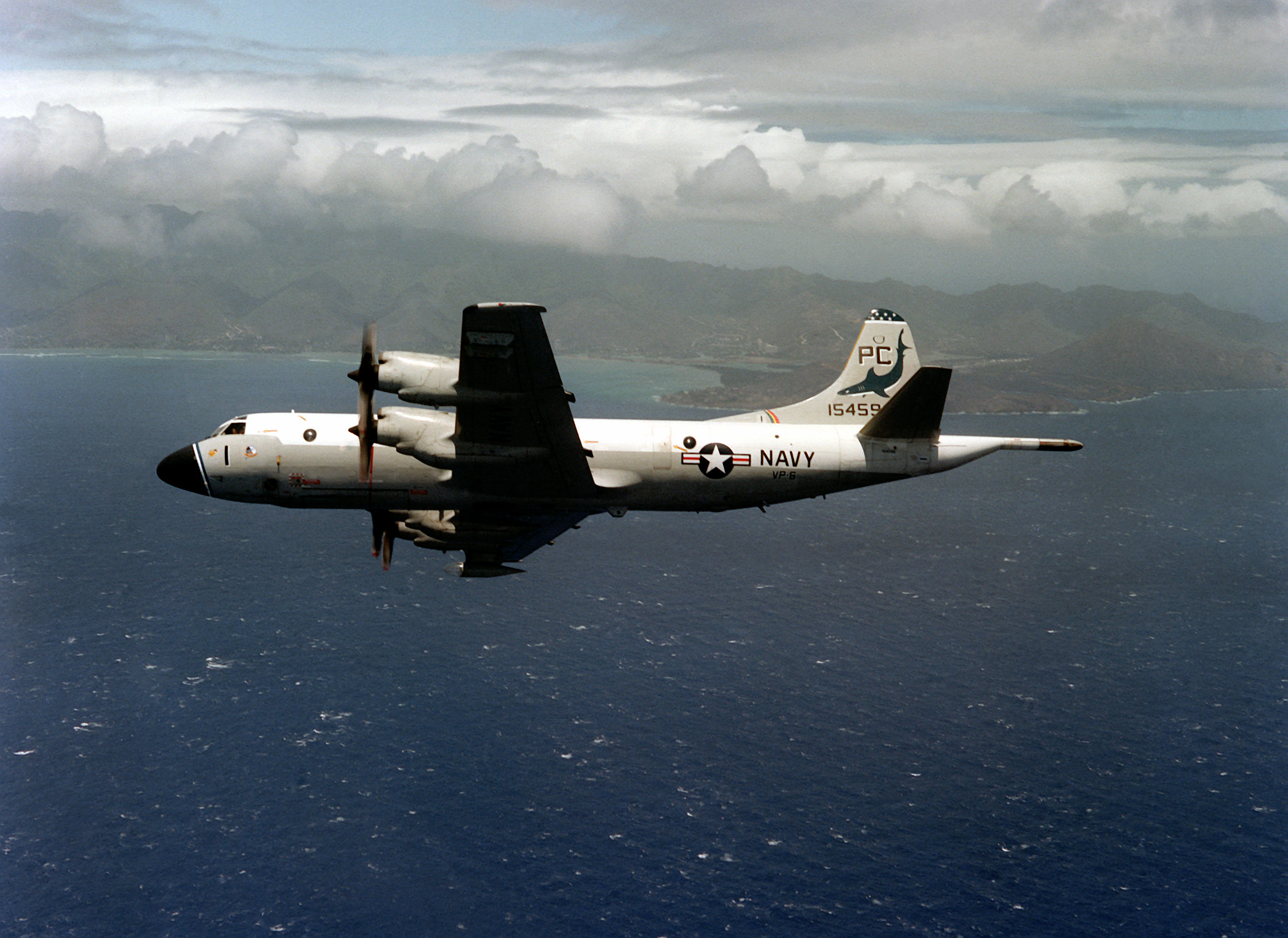
A P-3B of VP-6 near Hawaii

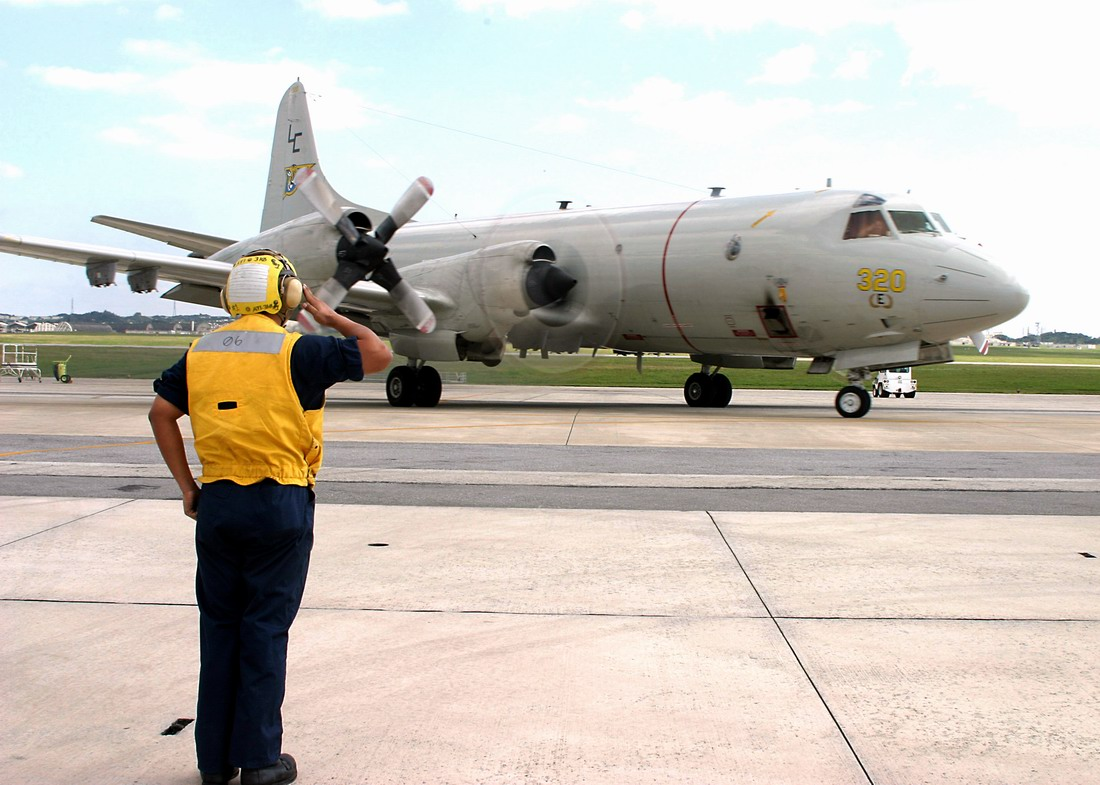
A US P-3C Orion of VP-8

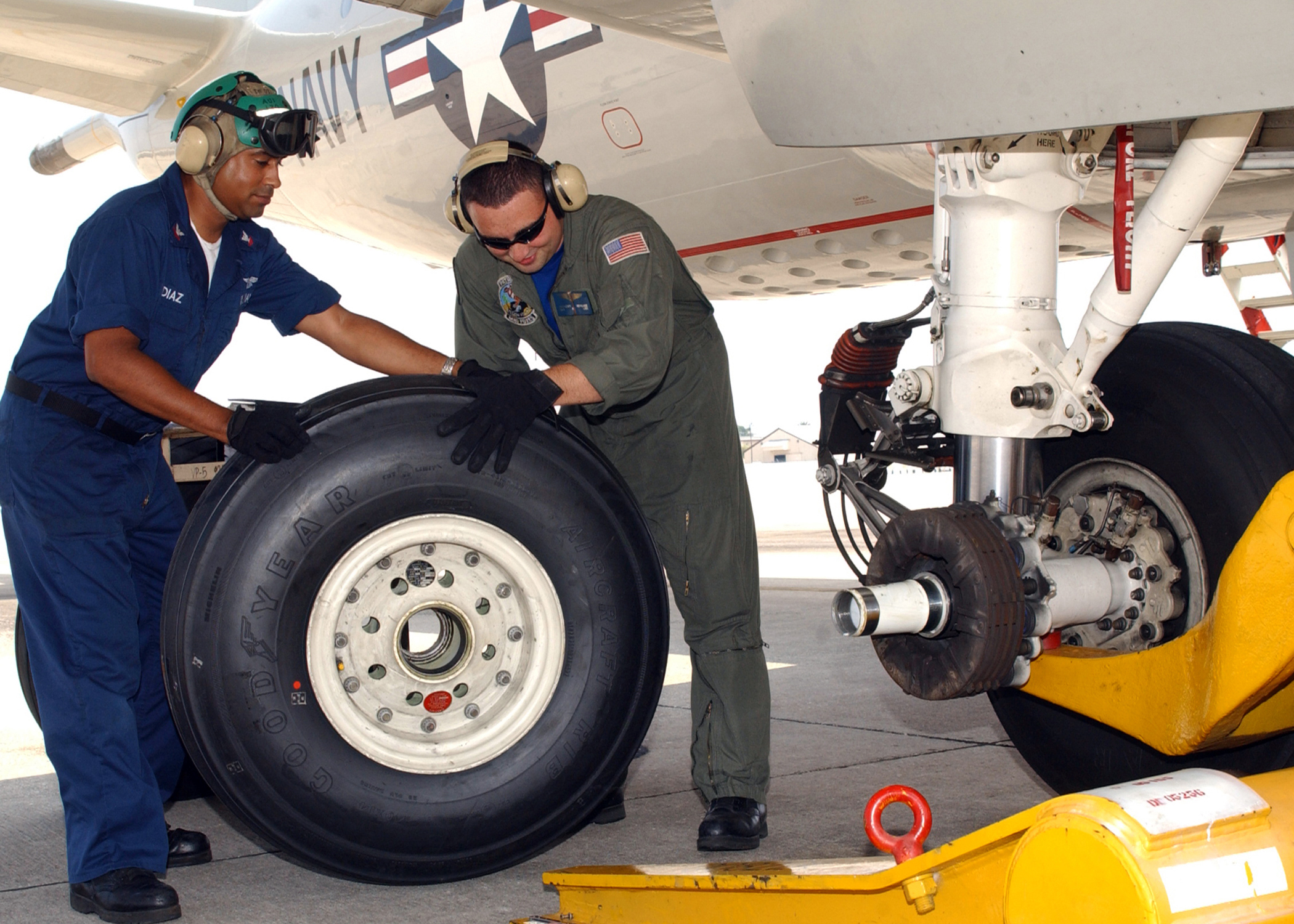
Changing a tire on a P-3C

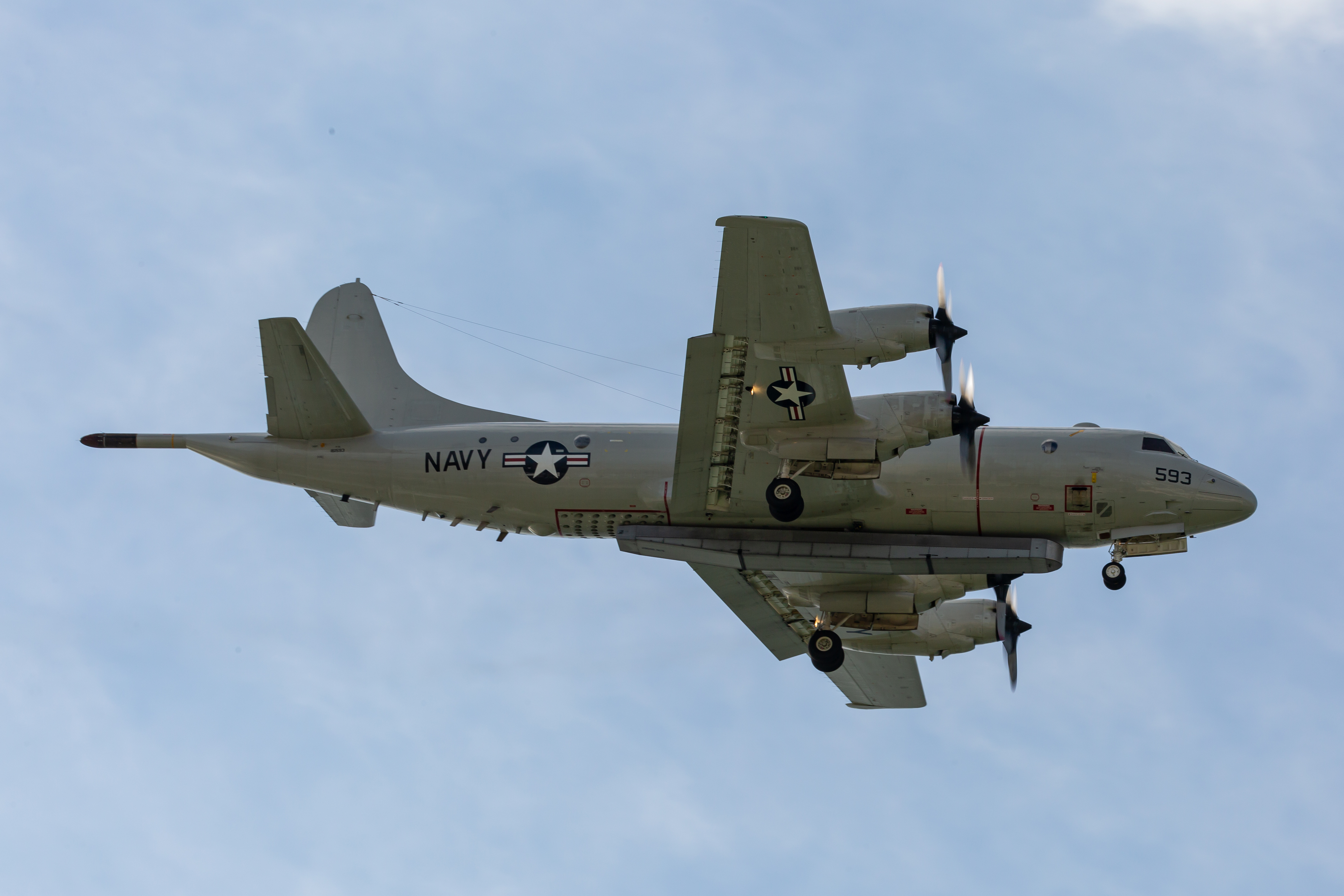
A P-3C on final approach at Kadena AB in 2019

Developed during the Cold War, the P-3's primary mission was to localize Soviet Navy ballistic missile and fast attack submarines detected by undersea surveillance systems and eliminate them in the event of full-scale war. At its height, the U.S. Navy's P-3 community consisted of twenty-four active duty "Fleet" patrol squadrons home based at air stations in the states of Florida and Hawaii as well as bases which formerly had P-3 operations in Maryland, Maine, and California.

There were also thirteen Naval Reserve patrol squadrons identical to their active duty "Fleet" counterparts, said Reserve "Fleet" squadrons being based in Florida, Pennsylvania, Maryland, Michigan, Massachusetts (later relocated to Maine), Illinois, Tennessee, Louisiana, California and Washington. Two Fleet Replacement Squadrons (FRS), also called "RAG" squadrons (from the historic "Replacement Air Group" nomenclature) were located in California and Florida. The since-deactivated VP-31 in California provided P-3 training for the Pacific Fleet, while VP-30 in Florida performed the task for the Atlantic Fleet. These squadrons were also augmented by a test and evaluation squadron in Maryland, two additional test and evaluation units that were part of an air development center in Pennsylvania and a test center in California, an oceanographic development squadron in Maryland, and two active duty "special projects" units in Maine and Hawaii, the latter being slightly smaller than a typical squadron.

In fiscal year 1995, the U.S. Navy planned to reduce active-duty patrol squadrons from sixteen to thirteen—seven on the East Coast, six on the West. The patrol squadrons planned to survive were VP-8, 10, 11, and 26 at NAS Brunswick, Maine, and VP-5, 16, and 45 at NAS Jacksonville, Florida. The Pacific squadrons that were to be retained were VP-1, 4, 9, and 47 at Barbers' Point, Hawaii, and 40 and VP-46 at NAS Whidbey Island, Washington. Thus Patrol Squadrons 17, 23, 24, and 49 were to be disestablished, and the remaining units were to operate nine aircraft instead of eight, augmented by VP-30 and the nine-at-the-time USNR P-3 squadrons.

Reconnaissance missions in international waters led to occasions where Soviet fighters would "bump" a P-3, either operated by the U.S. Navy or other operators such as the Royal Norwegian Air Force. On 1 April 2001, a midair collision between a United States Navy EP-3E ARIES II signals surveillance aircraft and a People's Liberation Army Navy J-8II jet fighter-interceptor resulted in an international dispute between the U.S. and the People's Republic of China (PRC).

More than 40 P-3 variants have demonstrated the type's rugged reliability, commonly flying 12-hour plus missions 200 ft (61 m) over water. Versions were developed for the National Oceanic and Atmospheric Administration (NOAA) for research and hurricane hunting/hurricane wall busting, for the U.S. Customs Service (now U.S. Customs and Border Protection) for drug interdiction and aerial surveillance mission with a rotodome adapted from the Grumman E-2 Hawkeye or an AN/APG-66 radar adapted from the General Dynamics F-16 Fighting Falcon, and for NASA for research and development.

The U.S. Navy remains the largest P-3 operator, currently distributed between a single fleet replacement (i.e., "training") patrol squadron in Florida (VP-30), 12 active duty patrol squadrons distributed between bases in Florida, Washington and Hawaii, two Navy Reserve patrol squadrons in Florida and Washington, one active duty special projects patrol squadron (VPU-2) in Hawaii, and two active duty test and evaluation squadrons. One additional active duty fleet reconnaissance squadron (VQ-1) operates the EP-3 Aries signals intelligence (SIGINT) variant at Naval Air Station Whidbey Island, Washington.

In January 2011, the U.S. Navy revealed that P-3s have been used to hunt down "third generation" narco-submarines. This is significant because as recently as July 2009, fully submersible submarines have been used in smuggling operations. As of November 2013, the US Navy began phasing out the P-3 in favor of the newer and more advanced Boeing P-8 Poseidon.

In May 2020, Patrol Squadron 40 completed the transition to the P-8, marking the retirement of the P-3C from U.S. Navy active duty service. The last of the active-duty P-3Cs, aircraft 162776, was also delivered to the Naval Aviation Museum in Pensacola, Florida. Two Navy Reserve squadrons, Air Test and Evaluation Squadron 30 and One Active duty Squadron (VQ-1) continued to fly the P-3C. In February 2025 VQ-1 retired their final EP-3E Aries II and P-3C, leaving VX-30 and VXS-1 as the only squadrons operating the P-3 in U.S. Navy service.

=== In Cuba ===
In October 1962, P-3As flew several blockade patrols in the vicinity of Cuba. Having only joined the operational Fleet earlier that year, this event marked the first employment of the P-3 in a real world "heightened threat" situation.

=== In Vietnam ===
Beginning in 1964, forward deployed P-3s began flying various missions under Operation Market Time from bases in the Philippines and South Vietnam. The primary focus of these coastal patrols was to stem the supply of materials to the Viet Cong by sea, although several of these missions also became overland "feet dry" sorties. During one such mission, a small caliber artillery shell passed through a P-3 without rendering it mission incapable. The only confirmed combat loss of a P-3 also occurred during Operation Market Time.

In April 1968, a U.S. Navy P-3B of VP-26 was downed by anti-aircraft fire in the Gulf of Thailand with the loss of the entire crew. Two months earlier in February 1968, another one of VP-26's P-3Bs was operating in the same vicinity when it crashed with the loss of the entire crew. Originally attributed to a low altitude mishap, later conjecture is that this aircraft may have also fallen victim to anti-aircraft artillery (AAA) fire from the same source as the April incident.

=== In Iraq ===
On 2 August 1990, Iraq invaded Kuwait and was poised to strike Saudi Arabia. Within 48 hours of the initial invasion, U.S. Navy P-3Cs were among the first American forces to arrive in the area. One was a modified platform with a prototype over-the-horizon targeting (OTH-T) system package known as "Outlaw Hunter"; it had been undergoing trials in the Pacific after being developed by Tiburon Systems, Inc. for NAVAIR's PMA-290 Program Office. Within hours of the coalition air campaign's start, "Outlaw Hunter" detected a large number of Iraqi patrol boats and naval vessels attempting to move from Basra and Umm Qasr to Iranian waters. "Outlaw Hunter" vectored in strike elements which attacked the flotilla near Bubiyan Island, destroying 11 vessels and damaging scores more. During Desert Shield, a P-3 using infrared imaging detected a ship with Iraqi markings beneath freshly-painted bogus Egyptian markings trying to avoid detection.

Several days before the 7 January 1991 commencement of Operation Desert Storm, a P-3C equipped with an APS-137 Inverse Synthetic Aperture Radar (ISAR) conducted coastal surveillance along Iraq and Kuwait to provide pre-strike reconnaissance on enemy military installations. A total of 55 of the 108 Iraqi vessels destroyed during the conflict were targeted by P-3Cs.

The P-3's mission expanded in the late 1990s and early 2000s to include battlespace surveillance both at sea and over land. The long range and long loiter time of the P-3 proved to be an invaluable asset during the invasion of Iraq and Operation Enduring Freedom, being able to instantaneously provide the gathered battlespace information to ground troops, particularly the U.S. Marines.

=== In Afghanistan ===
Although the P-3 is a MPA, armament and sensor upgrades in the Anti-surface Warfare Improvement Program (AIP) have made it suitable for sustained combat air support over land. In what became known as the "Decade in the Desert", Navy P-3Cs patrolled combat zones in the Middle East and Southwest Asia. From the start of the war in Afghanistan, U.S. Navy P-3s operated from Kandahar in that role. Royal Australian Air Force AP-3Cs operated out of Minhad Air Base in the UAE from 2003 until their withdrawal in November 2012. Between 2008 and 2012, AP-3Cs conducted overland intelligence, surveillance and reconnaissance tasks in support of coalition troops across Afghanistan.

The United States Geological Survey used the Orion to survey parts of southern and eastern Afghanistan for lithium, copper, and other mineral deposits.

=== In Libya ===
Several U.S. Navy P-3Cs, and two Canadian CP-140 Auroras, a variant of the Orion, participated in maritime surveillance missions over Libyan waters in the framework of enforcement of the 2011 no-fly zone over Libya.

A U.S. Navy P-3C supporting Operation Odyssey Dawn engaged the Libyan coast guard vessel Vittoria on 28 March 2011 after the vessel and eight smaller craft fired on merchant ships in the port of Misrata, Libya. The Orion fired AGM-65 Maverick missiles on Vittoria, which was subsequently beached.

=== Iran ===
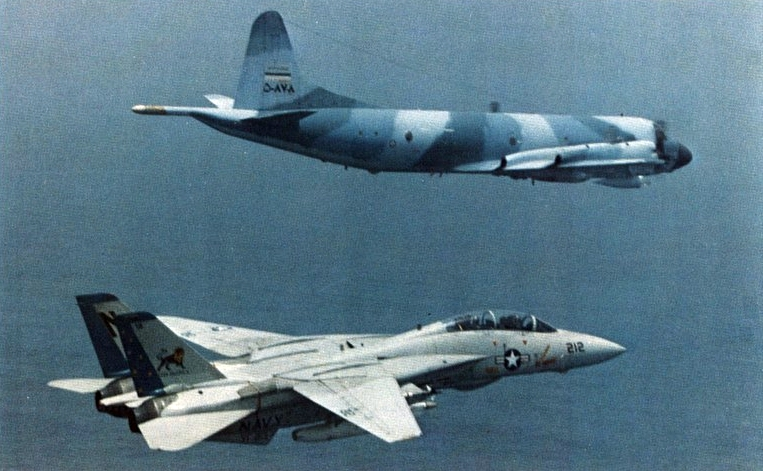
A U.S. Navy F-14A Tomcat belonging to VF-213 intercepts an IRIAF P-3F Orion over the Indian Ocean – 1981

Lockheed produced the P-3F variant of the P-3 Orion for Pahlavi Iran. Six examples were delivered to the former Imperial Iranian Air Force (IIAF) in 1975 and 1976.

Following the Iranian Revolution in 1979, the Orions continued in service, after the IIAF was renamed the Islamic Republic of Iran Air Force (IRIAF). They were used in the Tanker War phase of the Iran–Iraq War. A total of four P-3Fs remain in service.

=== Pakistan ===
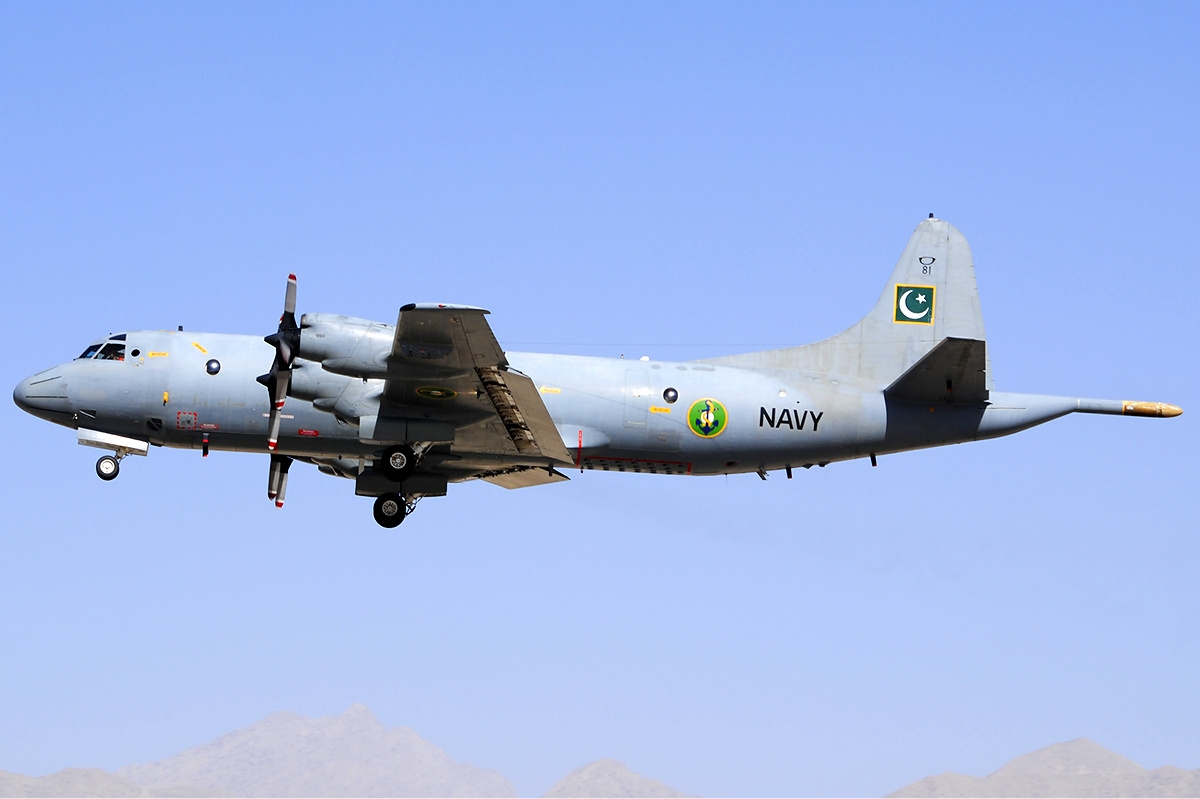
A Pakistan Navy P-3C Orion in Quetta, in October 2010

Three P-3C Orions, delivered to the Pakistan Navy in 1996 and 1997 were operated extensively during the Kargil conflict. After the crash of one with the loss of an entire crew, the type was grounded; nonetheless, the aircraft were maintained in an armed state and airworthy condition throughout the escalation period of 2001 and 2002. During 2007, they were used by the navy to conduct signals intelligence, airborne and bombing operations in a Swat offensive and Operation Rah-e-Nijat. Precision and strategic bombing missions were carried out by the P-3Cs; intelligence management operations were also conducted against Taliban and al-Qaeda operatives.

On 22 May 2011, two out of the four Pakistani P-3Cs were destroyed in an attack on PNS Mehran, a Pakistani Naval station in Karachi. In June 2011, the U.S. agreed to replace the destroyed aircraft with two new ones. In February 2012, the U.S. delivered two additional P-3Cs to the Pakistan Navy.

On 18 November 2016, during tensions with India, the Pakistan Navy dispatched various ASW units, including P-3Cs, in response to reports of an Indian Navy submarine that was allegedly loitering in close proximity to the Southern territorial waters of Pakistan in the Arabian Sea. This submarine was swiftly intercepted by the Navy Orions and forced away from the territorial boundaries.

=== In Somalia ===
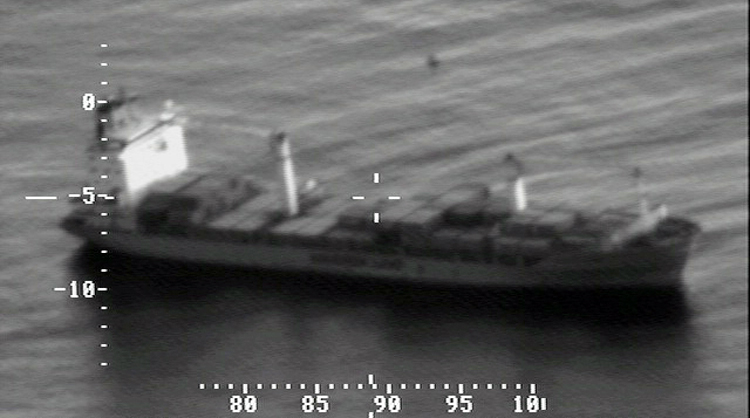
A U.S. Navy P-3C Orion monitoring the hijacking of MV Maersk Alabama, 2009

The Spanish Air Force deployed P-3s to assist the international effort against piracy in Somalia. On 29 October 2008, a Spanish P-3 patrolling Somalia's coast reacted to a distress call from an oil tanker in the Gulf of Aden; it overflew the pirate vessels three times, dropping a smoke bomb on each pass, as they attempted to board the tanker. After the third pass, the pirates broke off their attack. On 29 March 2009, the same P-3 pursued the assailants of the German navy tanker Spessart (A1442), resulting in the pirate's capture.

In April 2011, the Portuguese Air Force also contributed to Operation Ocean Shield by sending a P-3C which had early success when on its fifth mission detected a pirate whaler with two attack skiffs. Since 2009, the Japan Maritime Self-Defense Force has deployed P-3s to Djibouti for anti-piracy patrols, from 2011 from its own base. The German Navy has also periodically contributed a P-3 to address the piracy problem.

=== Civilian uses ===
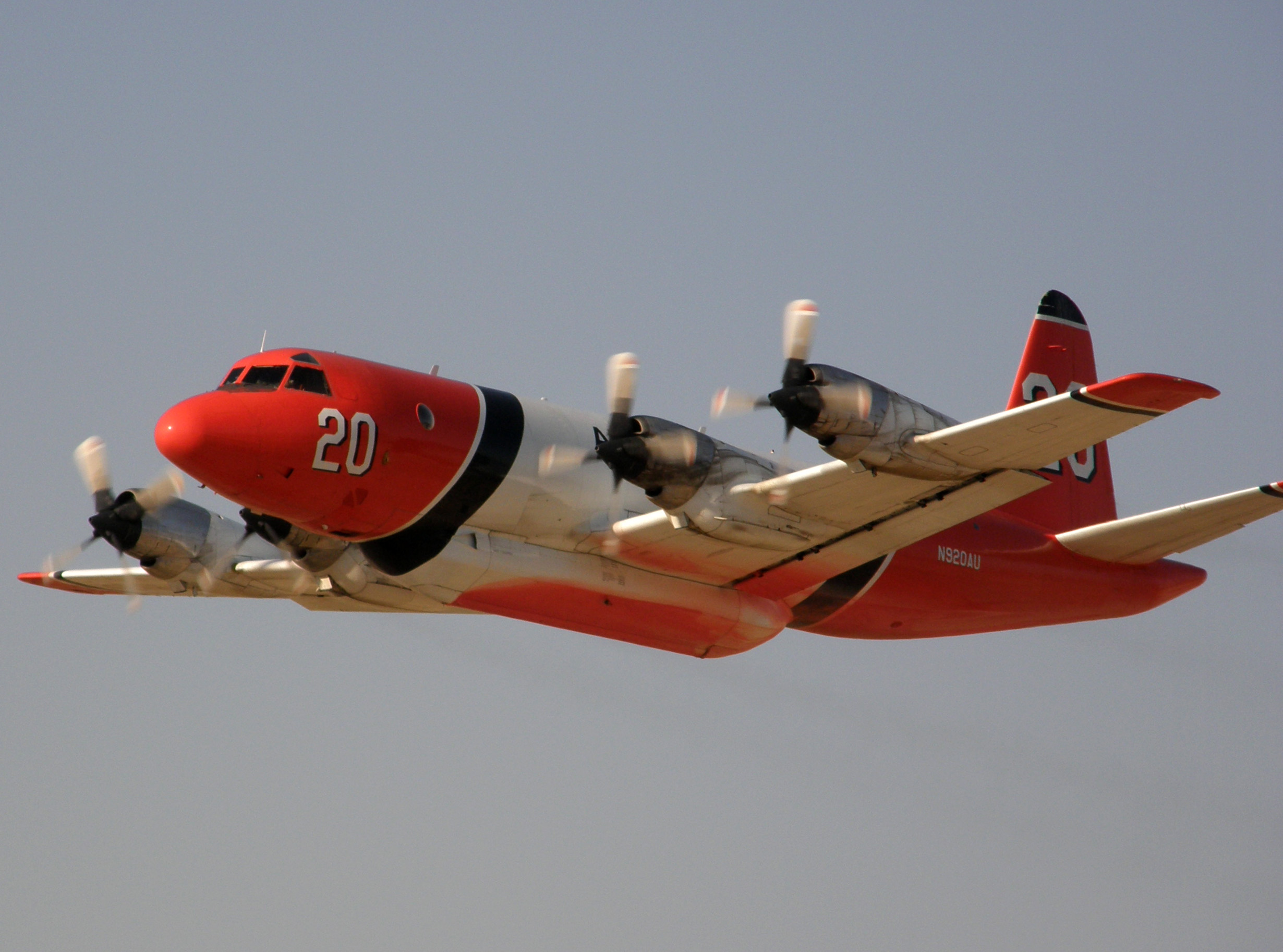
Aero Union P-3A Orion taking off from Fox Field, Lancaster, California, to fight the North Fire

Several P-3s have been N-registered and are operated by civilian agencies. The US Customs and Border Protection has several P-3A and P-3B aircraft that are used for aircraft intercept and maritime patrol. NOAA operates two WP-3D variants specially modified for hurricane research. One P-3, N426NA, is used by National Aeronautics and Space Administration (NASA) as an Earth science research platform, primarily for the NASA Science Mission Directorate's Airborne Science Program; it is based at Goddard Space Flight Center's Wallops Flight Facility, Virginia.

Aero Union, Inc. operated eight secondhand P-3As configured as air tankers, which were leased to the U.S. Forest Service, the California Department of Forestry and Fire Protection and other agencies for firefighting use. Several of these aircraft were involved in the U.S. Forest Service airtanker scandal but have not been involved in any catastrophic aircraft mishaps. Aero Union has since gone bankrupt, and their P-3s have been put up for auction.

== Variants ==
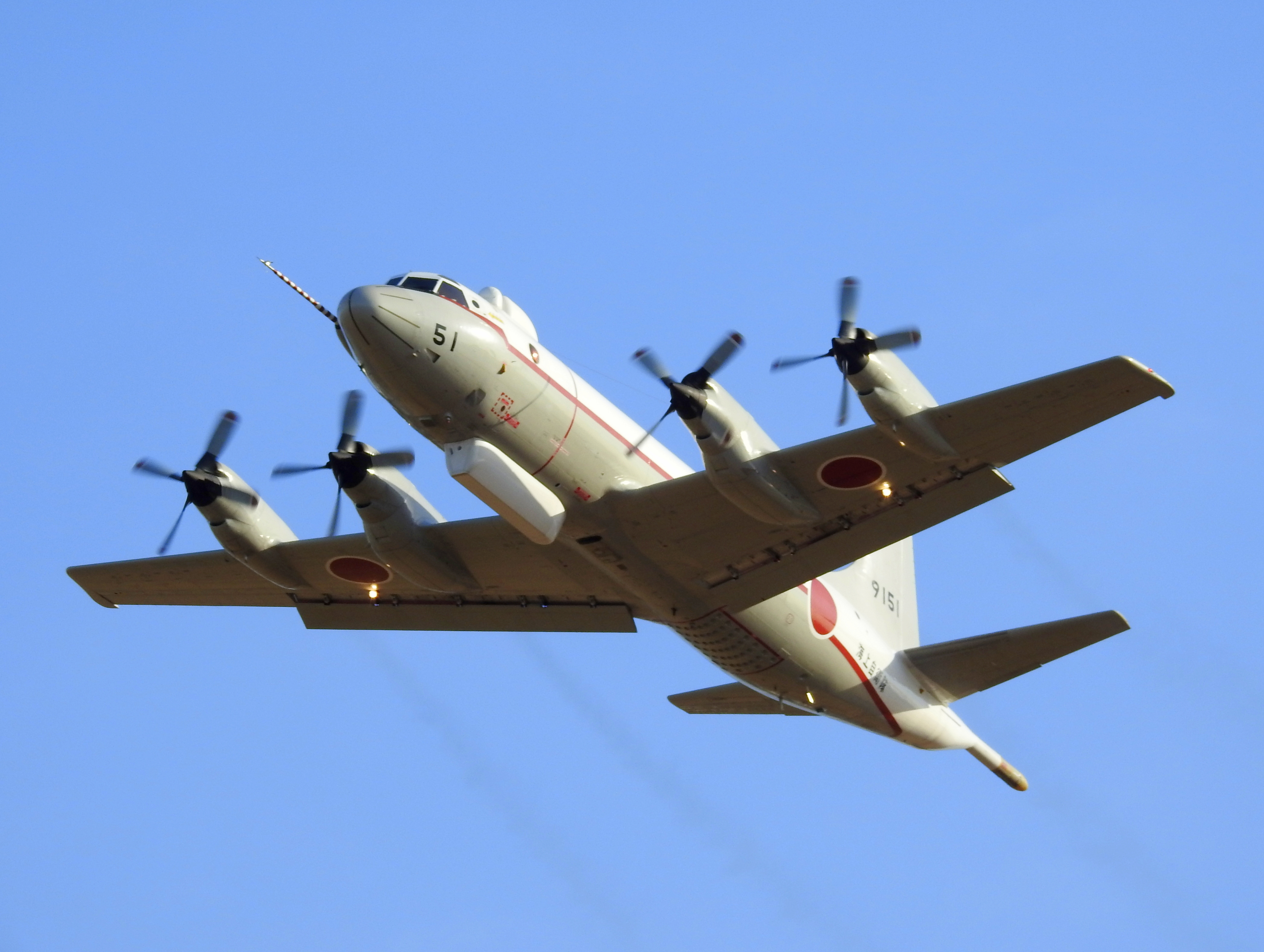
A Japan Maritime Self-Defense Force Lockheed UP-3C Orion #9151

Over the years, numerous variants of the P-3 have been created. A few notable examples are:

- WP-3D: Two P-3C aircraft as modified on the production line for NOAA weather research, including hurricane hunting.
- EP-3E Aries: 10 P-3A and 2 EP-3B aircraft converted into ELINT aircraft.
- EP-3E Aries II: 12 P-3C aircraft converted into ELINT aircraft.
- AP-3C: Royal Australian Air Force P-3C/W aircraft which have been extensively upgraded by L-3 Communications with new mission systems, including an Elta SAR/ISAR radar and a General Dynamics Canada acoustic processor system.
- CP-140M Aurora: Long-range maritime reconnaissance, anti-submarine warfare (ASW) aircraft for the Canadian Forces. Based on the P-3C Orion airframe, but mounts the more advanced electronics suite of the Lockheed S-3 Viking; 18 built
- CP-140A Arcturus: Three P-3s without ASW equipment for CP-140 Aurora crew training and various coastal patrol missions.
- P-7 proposed new-build and improved variant as a P-3 Orion replacement later canceled.
- Orion 21 proposed new-build and improved variant as a P-3 Orion replacement; lost to the Boeing P-8 Poseidon.
- P-3K2: Royal New Zealand Air Force Six P-3K2 aircraft which have been fully upgraded with totally new mission systems by L-3 Mission Integration Division, Greenville, Texas. The flight deck now has 'glass' instrumentation and navigation computer automation. The Tactical Rail (Tacrail) has been completely refitted with modern sensors, communication and data management systems.

== Operators ==
Military operators: Current Former

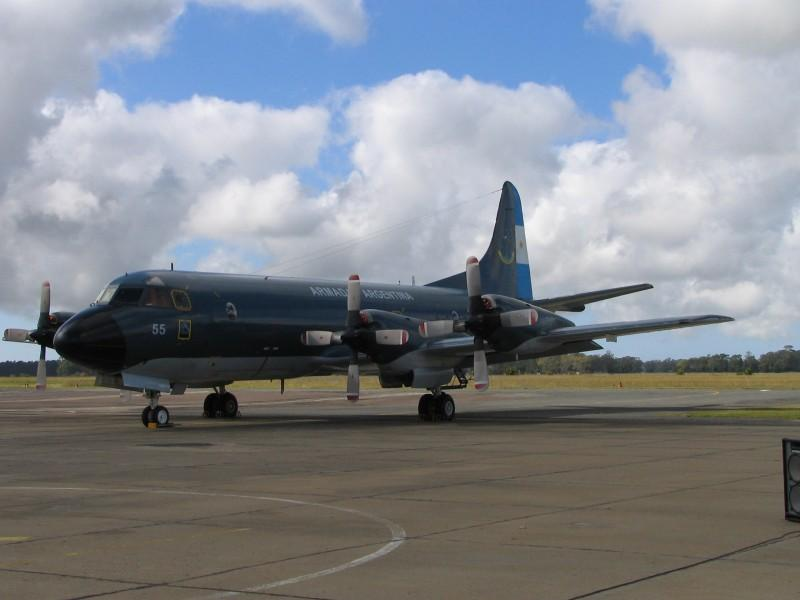
An Argentine Navy P-3B

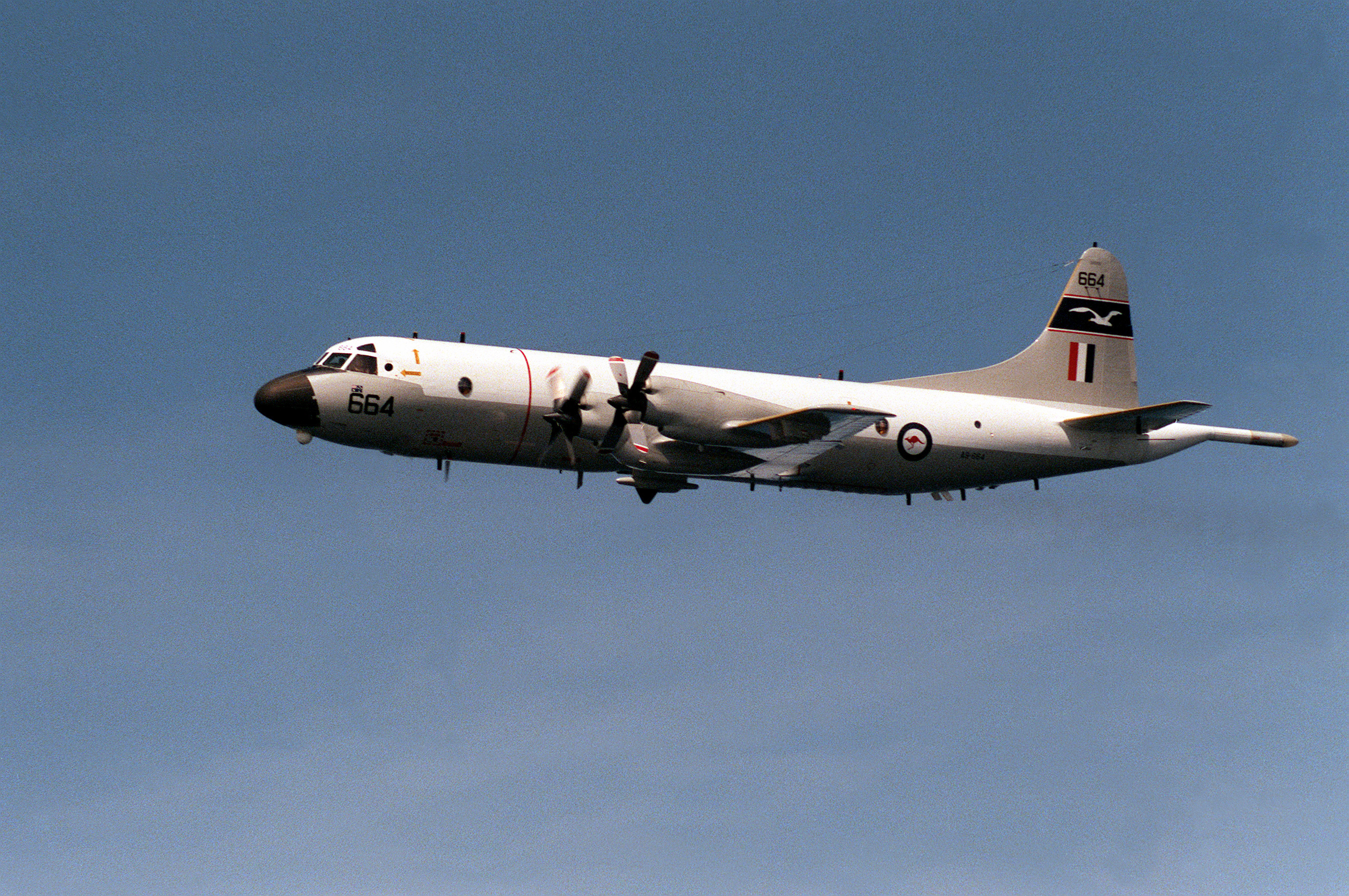
P-3C, 11 Sqn RAAF, in 1990

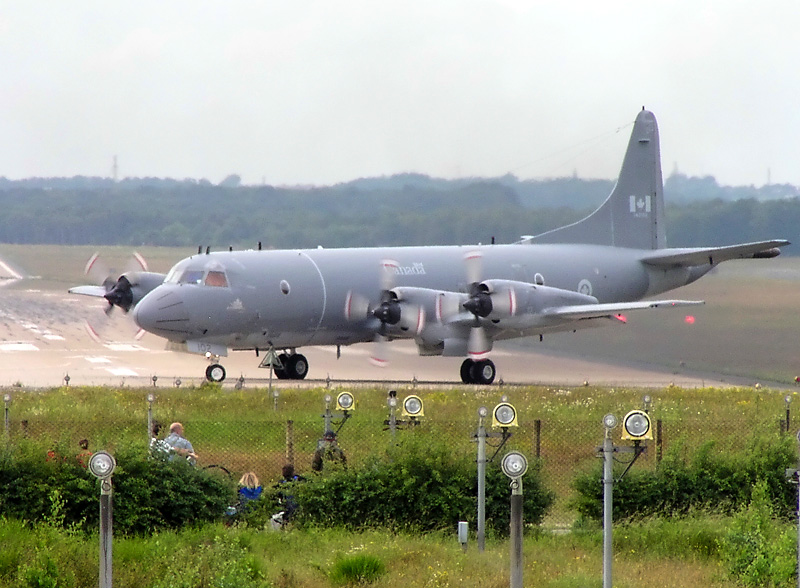
A Canadian CP-140 Aurora in June 2007

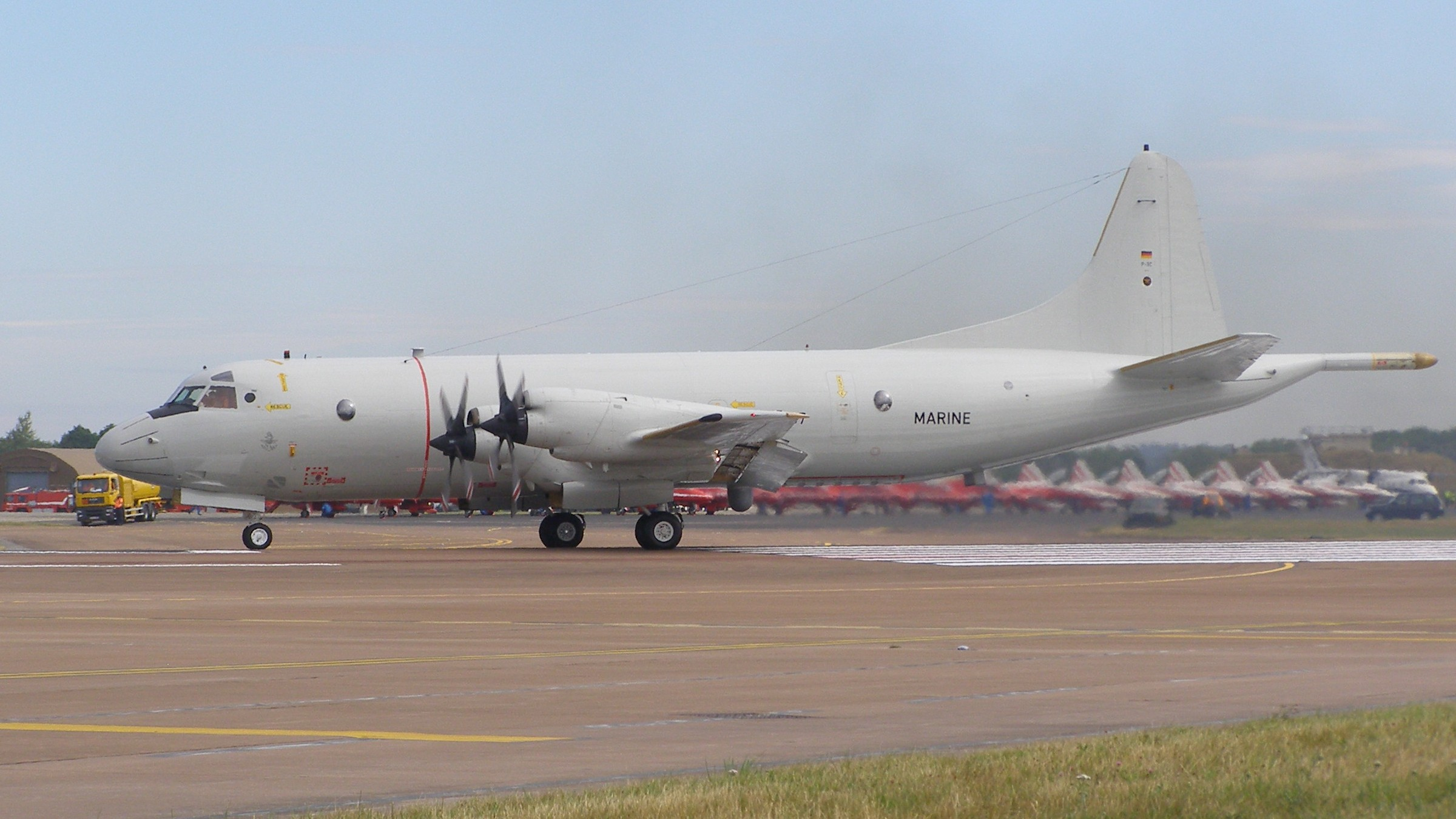
A P-3C of the German Navy

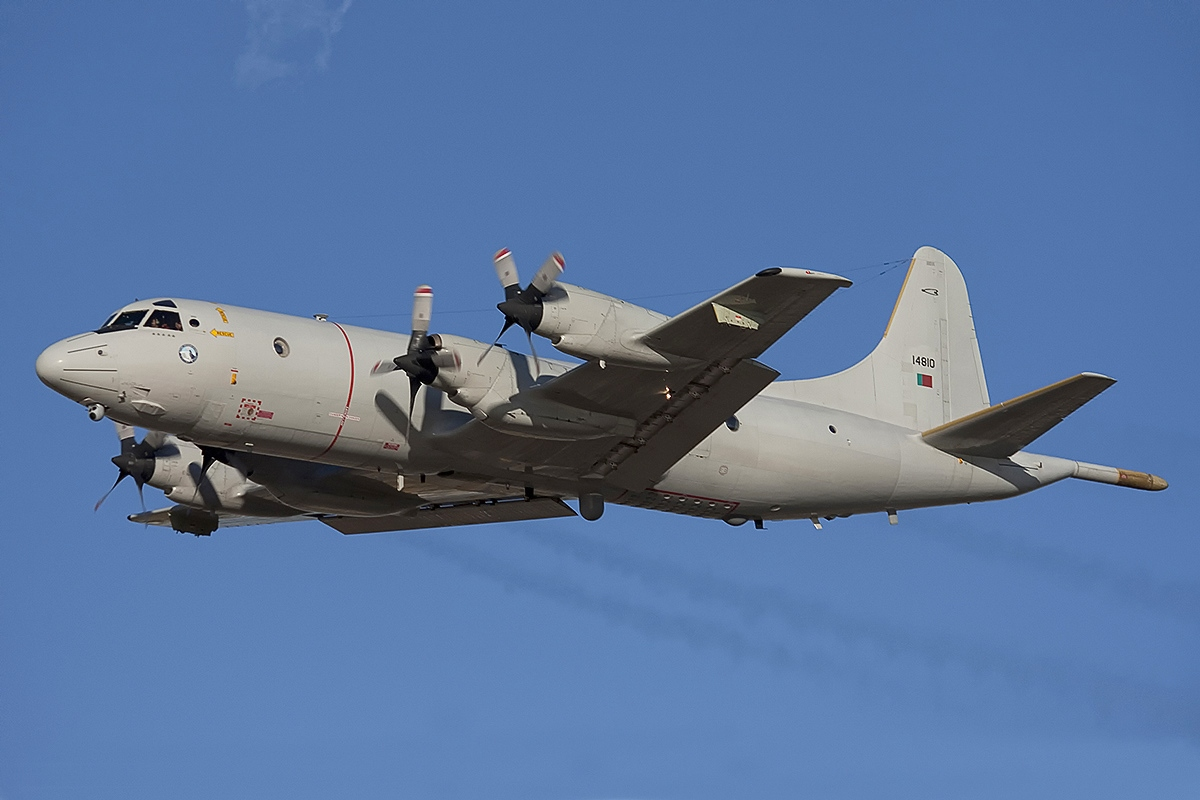
A Portuguese Air Force P-3C Orion Cup+ (s/n 14810)

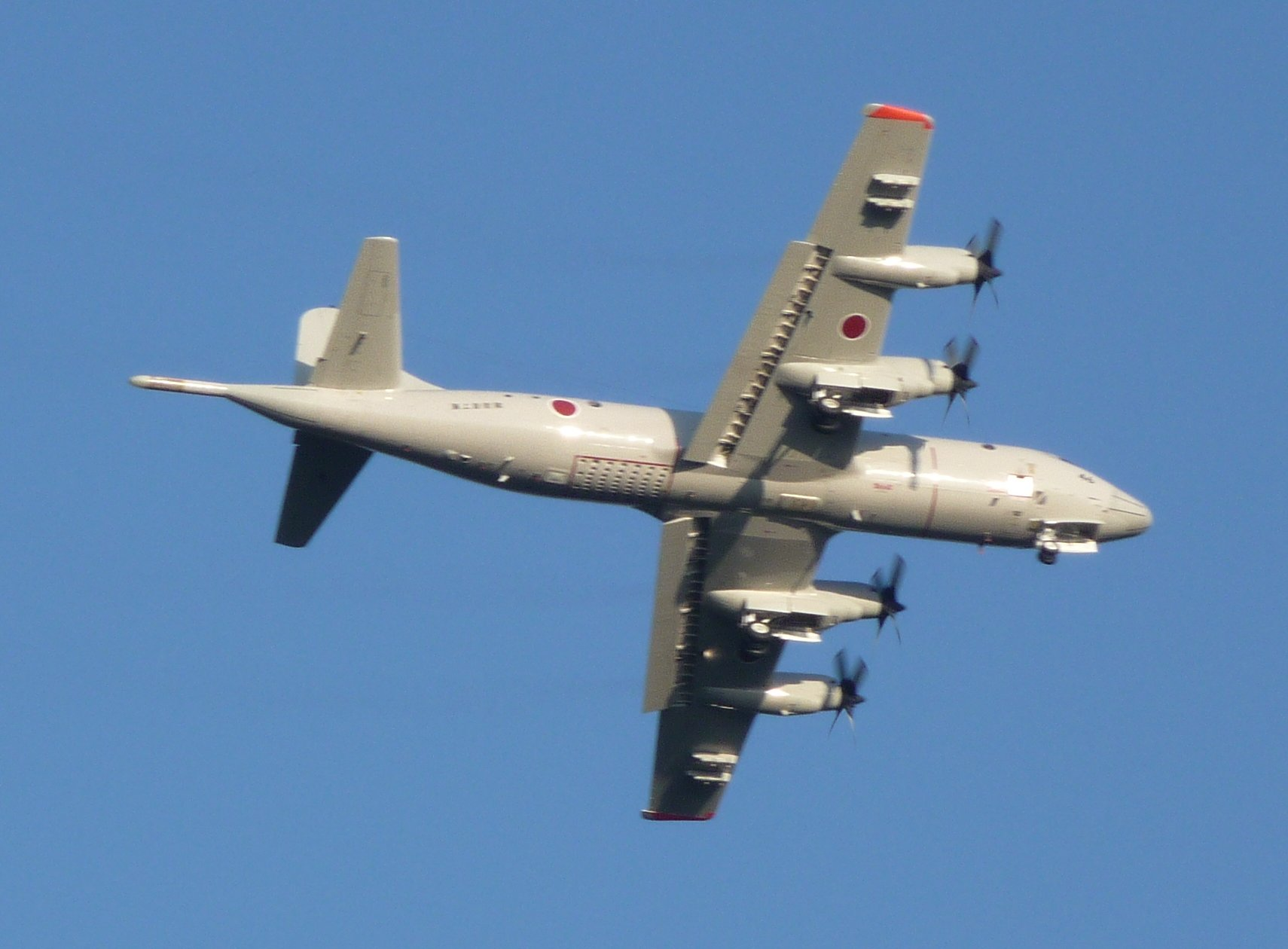
A Japan Maritime Self-Defense Force P-3C

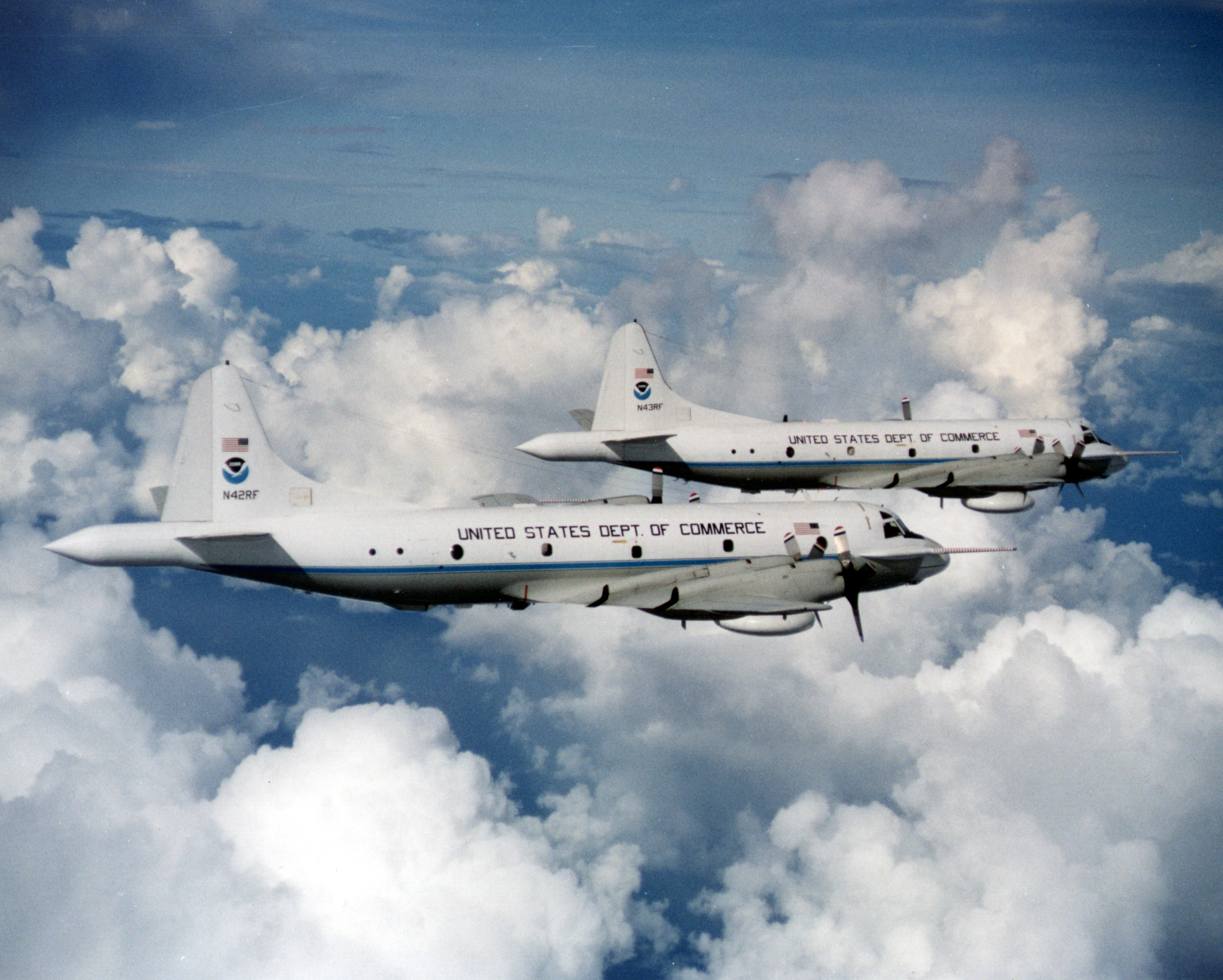
NOAA WP-3D Hurricane Hunters

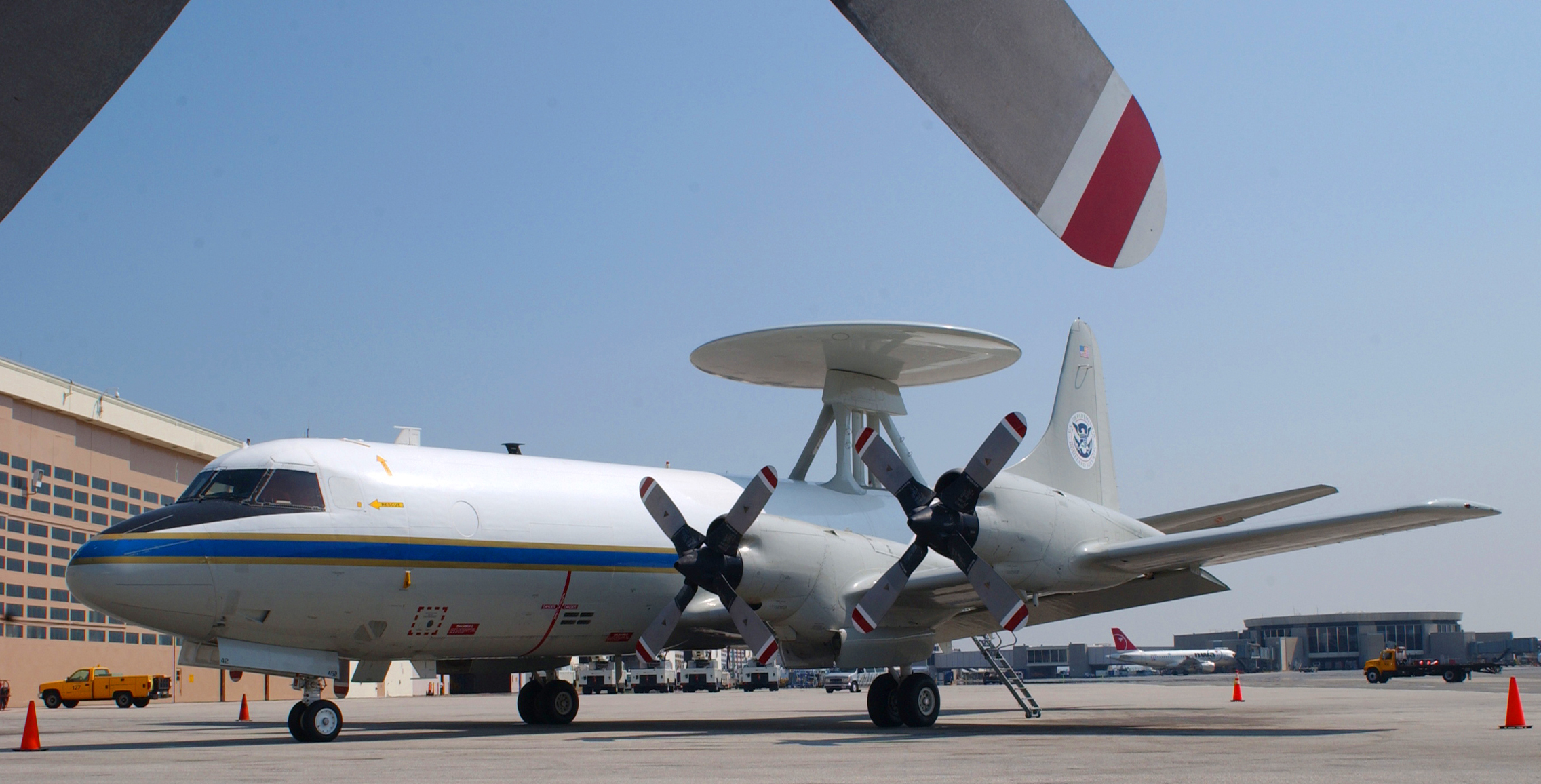
A U.S. Department of Homeland Security P-3AEW&C used to track drug couriers

=== Military operators ===
Argentina

- Argentine Naval Aviation – six P-3B. Based at Base Aeronaval Alte. Zar, Trelew; formerly assigned to Exploration Naval Squadron (Escuadrilla Aeronaval de Exploración) under Naval Aviation Force 3 (Fuerza Aeronaval 3) from 1997 to 2019 and now non-operational though being refurbished as of 2021. In August 2023, Argentina bought four surplus P-3s from Royal Norwegian Air Force. The first aircraft was delivered in September 2024.

Brazil

- Brazilian Air Force – 9 P-3AM (Upgraded) in 2008 (12 ex-USN airframes purchased). Integrated with the CASA FITS (Fully Integrated Tactical System) utilized in antisubmarine warfare.

Chile

- Chilean Navy – four P-3A; based at Base Aeronaval Torquemada, Concón. Three used as patrol aircraft, one used for personnel transport. Chile plans to extend their service lives past 2030 by changing the wings, modernizing the engines, and integrating the AGM-84 Harpoon anti-ship missile.

Canada

- Royal Canadian Air Force – Canada purchased 18 P-3A in 1980. The CP-140 Aurora are operated by 404 Long Range Patrol and Training Squadron, 405 Long Range Patrol Squadron, 415 Long Range Patrol Force Development Squadron, (all three from 14 Wing Greenwood), 407 Long Range Patrol Squadron (19 Wing Comox). Upgraded aircraft now referred to as CP-140M
- The RCAF also operated 3 CP-140A Arcturus, P-3 aircraft purchased in 1991 without an anti-submarine warfare suite and used primarily for pilot training and long-range surface patrol. The last two were retired in 2011 and transferred to AMARG.
- 14 CP-140M aircraft in use as of 2025

Germany

- German Navy – four P-3C CUP (ex-Royal Netherlands Navy, originally bought eight machines); based at NAS Nordholz, Marinefliegergeschwader 3 Graf Zeppelin

Greece

- Hellenic Air Force – six P-3B operated jointly with the Hellenic Navy, 1 returned in operable condition in May 2019, 4 additional are undergoing modernization as of 2025 which should return them to airworthy condition. The first upgraded aircraft was delivered on 15 June 2026.

Iran

- Islamic Republic of Iran Air Force – one P-3F (71ASW SQN); based at Shiraz International Airport (Shahid Douran Air Base)

Japan

- Japan Maritime Self-Defense Force – 93 P-3C, five EP-3, five OP-3C, one UP-3C, three UP-3D. The Kawasaki Aerospace Company assembled five airframes produced by Lockheed, and then Kawasaki produced more than 100 P-3s under license in Japan. The Kawasaki P-1 is gradually replacing them. As of March 2022, the JMSDF operated 40 P-3Cs.
  - Air Patrol Squadron 3 (JMSDF) (1984–2017)

Pakistan

- Pakistan Naval Air Arm – ~Four P-3C; based in Naval aviation base Faisal, Karachi. Upgraded P-3C MPA and P-3B AEW models (equipped with Hawkeye 2000 AEW system) ordered in 2006, first upgraded P-3C (Update II.5 CUP) delivered in early 2007. In June 2010, two more upgraded P-3Cs joined the Pakistan Navy with anti-ship and submarine warfare capabilities. A total of nine. Two aircraft were destroyed in an attack by armed militants at the Mehran Naval Airbase.
- 28th ASW Squadron (PN)

Portugal

- Portuguese Air Force Total 11:
  - 3 P-3C Update II-5 and 2 P-3C CUP CG purchased from the Royal Netherlands Navy in 2006, modernised from 2008 to 2010 to the P-3C CUP+ standard with new sensors and a Missile and Laser Warning System. They replaced six former RAAF P-3Bs upgraded to P-3Ps in the late 1980s. The last P-3P flew on 13 October 2011. In 2022 Portuguese Air Force, General Dynamics and Canadian Commercial Corporation signed a contract to modernize the Portuguese P-3C's fleet to P-3C CUP+ Block II version with new communications, mission electronics and an Mission Management System. The planes are operated by 601 Squadron "Lobos", based in Beja Air Base.
  - 6 P-3C CUP as well as spares, Mid-Life Upgrade sets, support equipment and flight simulators acquired from German Navy. Canada will modernize 5 of these 6 P-3s for Portugal to P-3C CUP+ Block II version.

South Korea

- Republic of Korea Navy – eight P-3Cs, eight P-3CKs; based in Pohang Airport (Patrol Squadron 615) and Jeju international airport. Korean Air/L-3 Communications upgraded the P-3Cs with new electronics, including magnetic anomaly detectors, electro-optical sensors, surveillance equipment and a self-protection suite. The Navy's impetus stems from a 2010 experience in which ROK forces detected only 28% of North Korean submarines involved in exercises.

Taiwan

- Republic of China Air Force (1966–1967) – Three P-3As (149669, 149673, 149678) obtained by the CIA from the U.S. Navy under Project STSPIN in May 1963, as replacement aircraft for CIA's own covert operation fleet of RB-69A/P2V-7U versions. Converted by Aerosystems Division of LTV to be used as both ELINT and COMINT platform, the three P-3As were known as "black" P-3As under Project Axial. Officially transferred to the CIA on June/July 1964, the first of three "black" P-3As arrived in Taiwan and officially transferred to ROCAF's secret Black Bat Squadron on 22 June 1966. Armed with four Sidewinder short range AAM missiles for self-defense, the three "black" P-3A flew peripheral missions along China's coast to collect SIGINT and air samples. When the project was terminated in January 1967, all three "black" P-3As were flown to NAS Alameda, CA, for long-term storage. In September 1967, Lockheed at Burbank, converted two of the three aircraft (149669 and 149678) into the only two EP-3B examples in existence, while the third aircraft (149673) was converted by Lockheed in 1969–1970 to serve as a development aircraft for various electronic programs. The two EP-3Bs known as "Bat Rack", owing to their service with Taiwan's "Black Bat" Squadron, were issued to U.S. Navy's VQ-1 Squadron in 1969 and deployed to Da Nang, Vietnam. Later, the two EP-3Bs were converted to EP-3E ARIES, along with seven EP-3As. The two EP-3Es retired in the 1980s, when replaced by 12 EP-3E ARIES II versions.
- Republic of China Navy – The Republic of China Navy obtained 12 P-3Cs under the U.S. government's Foreign Military Sales program in 2007 which were then modernized for an additional 15,000 flight hours. 12 P-3Cs (ordered, with deliveries starting in 2012), with three spare airframes that may be converting to EP-3E standard; based in the south part of the island and offshore. In May 2014 Lockheed Martin were awarded a contract to upgrade and overhaul all 12 P-3Cs by August 2015.

United States

- United States Navy – Three P-3C and one NP-3D remain in service with VX-30, with another two NP-3C active with VXS-1. The P-3s were replaced in active duty and reserve squadrons by the Boeing P-8 Poseidon.

=== Former military operators ===
Australia

- Royal Australian Air Force – 18 AP-3C, 1 P-3C (1968–2023)
  - No. 92 Wing
    - 10 Sqn, 11 Sqn and No. 292 Sqn; based at RAAF Base Edinburgh.

Pahlavi Iran

- Imperial Iranian Air Force - 6 P-3F operated from 1975 to 1979.

Netherlands

- Royal Netherlands Navy (Netherlands Naval Aviation Service) - 13 P-3 Orion CUP operated from 1982 to 2006. Sold to Portugal and Germany.

New Zealand

- Royal New Zealand Air Force - 6 P-3B upgraded to P-3K2 operated by No. 5 Squadron from 1966 - 2023. Five delivered in 1966, with another purchased from the RAAF in 1985. All six were upgraded by L-3 Communications Canada and designated the P-3K2, with the first aircraft returned to New Zealand in 2011. In 2018, the New Zealand Government announced that the aircraft would be replaced by 4 new Boeing P-8A Poseidon aircraft. By July 2023, these had been delivered, and the P-3's were withdrawn from service.

Norway

- Royal Norwegian Air Force - 7 P-3B with two upgraded to P-3N, 4 P-3C operated by 333 Squadron from 1969 to 2023. Formerly based at Andøya Air Station.

Portugal

- Portuguese Air Force - 6 former RAAF P-3Bs upgraded to P-3Ps in the late 1980s and retired in October 2011. They were replaced by Dutch P-3 Orion.

Spain

- Spanish Air and Space Force – Two P-3A HWs, four P-3B ( ex-Norway) upgraded to P-3M, based at Morón Air Base. Operated from 1971 to 16 December 2022.

Thailand

- Royal Thai Navy – two P-3Ts (designated B.TPh.2B (Thai: บ.ตผ.๒ข)), one VP-3T, one UP-3T (B.TPh.2A (Thai: บ.ตผ.๒ก)); based at U-Tapao Royal Thai Navy Airfield (102 Sqn). Operated from 1995 to 2014.

=== Civilian operators ===
==== United States ====
- Buffalo Airways – one P-3A, Aerial firefighting|Waterbomber; Buffalo Airways USA Inc - N922AU
- National Oceanographic and Atmospheric Administration (NOAA) – two WP-3Ds flown by NOAA Commissioned Corps officers, previously based at MacDill AFB, now based at Lakeland Linder International Airport, Florida
- National Aeronautics and Space Administration – one ex-USN P-3B; based at NASA's Wallops Flight Facility, Virginia, used for low altitude heavy lift airborne science missions, modified to support passive microwave instruments, such as NOAA's Polarimetric Scanning Radiometer (PSR), NASA's 2-DSTAR, and the Jet Propulsion Laboratory (JPL) polarimetric scatterometer (POLSCAT) instruments.
- United States Department of Homeland Security / Bureau of Customs and Border Protection / Office of Air and Marine – eight P-3 AEWs; based at NAS Corpus Christi, Texas, and Cecil Field and NAS Jacksonville, Florida. Used for border patrol and anti-drug duties. Former USN aircraft, modified and equipped with the same airborne early warning radar as fitted to the E-2 Hawkeye.
- United States Department of Homeland Security / Bureau of Customs and Border Protection / Office of Air and Marine – 8 P-3 LRTs (Long Range Tracker). Former USN aircraft also based at NAS Corpus Christi, Texas, and Cecil Field, Jacksonville, Florida. Normally operate in tandem with P-3 AEW aircraft.
- Airstrike Firefighters – 1 former Aero Union Tanker 23, with plans for 6 more P-3s.

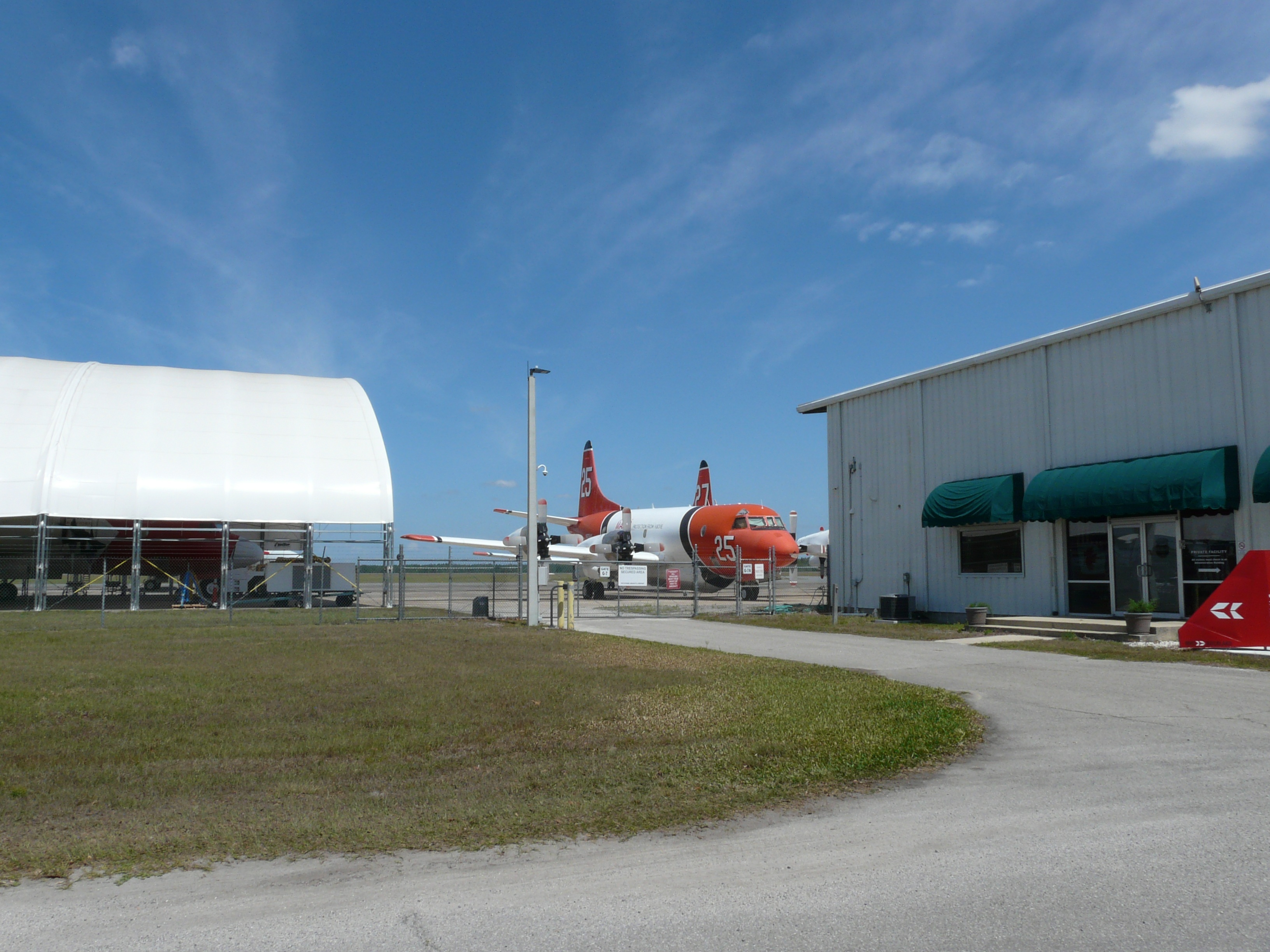
P-3A Tanker 25 at Keystone Heights Airport

- MHD-Rockland Services – 5 former RAAF AP-3Cs. Aircraft are FAA Registered as L285D, and based in Keystone Heights, Florida. MHD-Rockland acquired former Airstrike P-3As in 2024.

=== Former civilian operators ===
==== United States ====
- Aero Union – eight ex-USN P-3A; aircraft based at Chico Municipal Airport in Chico, California and converted into aerial firefighting platforms. Aero Union shut down and put its Orions up for auction in 2011.

== Notable events, accidents, and incidents ==
- 30 January 1963: A P-3A, BuNo 149762, was lost at sea in the Atlantic Ocean, 14 crew killed.
- 4 July 1966: A P-3A, BuNo 152172, construction number 185-5142, assigned to VP-19, Radio call sign Papa Echo Zero Five (PE-05), crashed 7 miles (11 km) northeast Battle Creek, MI. It was on the return leg of a cross country training flight from NAS New York-Floyd Bennett Field, New York to NAS Moffett Field, California via NAS Glenview, Illinois; all four crew lost.
- 6 February 1968: A P-3B, BuNo 153440, construction number 185-5237, assigned to VP-26, crashed during an Operation Market Time combat patrol off Phu Quoc Island, Vietnam. All 12 crew were lost as MIA. Initially attributed to mechanical failure, it was later suggested that it may have been shot down.
- 1 April 1968: A P-3B, Registration 153445, construction number 185-5241, assigned to VP-26, was shot down by surface anti-aircraft fire during an Operation Market Time combat patrol off Phu Quoc Island, Vietnam. The AAA fire set an engine on fire, and during a subsequent landing attempt, the wing separated and the aircraft crashed, with the loss of all 12 crew.
- 5 April 1968: A P-3A Orion (BuNo 151350) assigned to VP-6 and temporarily based at NAF Naha, Okinawa, crashed into the Pacific Ocean during an anti-submarine warfare training exercise with USS Rock (SSR-274). The aircraft struck the water following an undetected loss of altitude approximately 20 minutes into the exercise. Of the 12 crew members aboard, eight were lost at sea and were not recovered, and four survived. The Navy accident investigation could not determine a definitive cause but identified pilot attention directed outside the cockpit by one or both pilots during the unnoticed descent as the most probable cause while considering several possible contributing factors, including autopilot and radar altimeter system malfunctions.
- 11 April 1968: An RAAF P-3B, Registration A9-296, construction number 185-5406, crashed on runway 32L at NAS Moffett Field, California after departing the manufacturer's facility during pre-delivery acceptance trials. The left main mount (undercarriage) collapsed upon landing and the aircraft ground-looped. All crew survived without serious injury, but the aircraft was completely destroyed by the resulting fire.
- 6 March 1969: USN P-3A BuNo 152765 tail coded RP-07 of VP-31 crashed at NAS Lemoore, California, at the end of a practice ground control approach (GCA) landing, all six crew died.
- 28 January 1971: Commander Donald H. Lilienthal, USN flew a P-3C Orion to a world speed record for heavyweight turboprops. Over 15–25 kilometers, he reached 501 miles per hour to break the Soviet Il-18's May 1968 record of 452 miles per hour.
- 26 May 1972: USN P-3A BuNo 152155 disappeared over the Pacific Ocean on a routine training mission after departing NAS Moffett Field, California, with the loss of eight crew members.
- 3 June 1972: While attempting to fly through the Straits of Gibraltar, en route from Naval Station Rota, Spain to Naval Air Station Sigonella, Sicily, a P-3A of VP-44 hit a mountain in Morocco, resulting in the death of all 14 crew on board.
- 12 April 1973: A P-3C, BuNo 157332, operating from NAS Moffett Field, California collided with a Convair 990 (N711NA) operated by NASA during approach to runway 32L. They crashed on the Sunnyvale Municipal Golf Course, 0.5 miles (0.80 km) short of the runway, resulting in destruction of both aircraft and the death of all but one crewmember.
- 11 December 1977: USN P-3B BuNo 153428 from VP-11 operating from Lajes Field, Azores crashed on mountainous El Hierro (southwesternmost of the Canary Islands) in poor visibility. There were no survivors from the crew of 13.
- 26 April 1978: USN P-3B BuNo 152724 from VP-23 crashed on landing approach to Lajes Field, Azores. Seven of the crew were killed and the plane sank into deep water preventing recovery to assess the cause of the crash.
- 22 September 1978: USN P-3B BuNo 152757 from VP-8 disintegrated over Poland, Maine on 22 September 1978. An over-pressurized fuel tank caused the port wing to separate at the outboard engine. The detached wing sheared off part of the tail; and aerodynamic forces caused the remaining engines and starboard wing to detach from the fuselage. Debris rained down near the south end of Tripp Pond shortly after 12:00. None of the 8-man crew survived.
- 26 October 1978: USN P-3C, BuNo 159892, call sign coded AF 586 from VP-9 operating from NAS Adak ditched at sea after an engine fire caused by a propeller malfunction. All but two of the 15-man crew were rescued by a Soviet trawler, but three crew members died of exposure.
- 27 June 1979: A P-3B, BuNo 154596, from VP-22 operating from NAS Cubi Point Philippines, had a propeller overspeed shortly after departure. The number 4 propeller then departed the aircraft, striking the number three with a subsequent fire on that engine. While attempting an overweight landing with two engines out, the aircraft stalled, rolled inverted and crashed in Subic Bay just past Grande Island. Four crew and one passenger were killed in the crash.
- 17 April 1980: USN P-3C BuNo 158213 from VP-50 while flying for a parachuting exhibition in Pago Pago, American Samoa struck overhead tram wires and crashed, killing all six crew on board.
- 17 May 1983: USN P-3B BuNo 152733 tail coded YB-07 from VP-1 inadvertently landed gear up during a routine dedicated field work (DFW) pilot training flight at NAS Barbers Point. No crew were injured but the aircraft was a total loss.
- 16 June 1983: USN P-3B, BuNo 152720, tail coded YB-06 from VP-1 at NAS Barbers Point crashed into a mountain top in fog and low clouds on the Napali Coast between the Honopū and Kalalau valleys in Kauai, Hawai'i, killing all 14 on board.
- 6 January 1987: Following a seven-hour P-3 ASW patrol, VP-6's Crew Eight initiated restart of the loitered No. 1 engine, 830 nm from NAS Barbers Point. The engine encountered RPM problems and failed to feather and overspeed leading to gearbox issues. After six hours of flight back to Barbers Point and only 12 nm from the runway, the No. 1 prop disconnected and collided with prop No. 2 removing two prop tips. This caused the aircraft to roll violently to the left until prop No. 2 was able to be locked with the prop brake. Despite this, the crew managed to touch down on centerline, 2,000 feet down the runway, completing its landing roll-out with 2,500 feet remaining and all crew surviving. Due to this event, P-3 engine oil protocol was adjusted.
- 13 September 1987: A Royal Norwegian Air Force P-3B, tail number "602", was hit from below by a Russian Sukhoi Su-27 of the 941st IAP V-PVO. The Su-27 flew below the P-3's starboard side, then accelerated and pulled up, clipping the #4 engine's propellers. The propeller shrapnel hit the P-3B's fuselage and caused a decompression. There were no injuries and both aircraft returned safely to base.
- 25 September 1990: The first production P-3C Update III, BuNo 161762, assigned to VP-31 at NAS Moffett Field, impacted the runway at an excessive rate of descent while conducting a dedicated field work sortie at Naval Auxiliary Landing Field Crows Landing. Both main landing gear failed and the aircraft slid down the runway. Some crewmembers sustained minor injuries, but there were no fatalities. The aircraft was a total loss.
- 21 March 1991: While on a training mission west of San Diego, California, two USN P-3Cs, BuNos 158930 and 159325, assigned to VP-50 based at NAS Moffett Field collided in midair, killing all 27 crew on board both aircraft.
- 26 April 1991: An RAAF AP-3C, tail number A9-754, lost a wing leading edge and crashed into shallow water in the Cocos Island; one crewman was killed. It was cut up and became an artificial reef.
- 16 October 1991: P-3A N924AU of Aero Union crashed into a mountain in Montana, United States killing both crew.
- 25 March 1995: USN P-3C BuNo 158217 assigned to VP-47 was returning from a training mission in the North Arabian Sea when it suffered catastrophic engine failure of the number 4 engine. The aircraft ditched at sea 2 miles (3.2 km) from RAFO Masirah, Oman. All 11 crewmembers were rescued by the Royal Omani Air Force.
- 1 April 2001: An aerial collision known as the Hainan Island incident between a USN EP-3E ARIES II, BuNo 156511 assigned to VQ-1, a signals reconnaissance version of the P-3C, and a People's Liberation Army Navy J-8IIM fighter resulted in the J-8IIM crashing and its pilot was killed. The EP-3 came close to becoming uncontrollable, at one point sustaining a near inverted roll, but was able to make an emergency landing on Hainan.
- 20 April 2005: P-3B N926AU of Aero Union crashed while conducting practice drops of water over an area of rugged mountainous terrain located north of the Chico Airport. All three crew on board were killed.
- 21 October 2008: P-3C USN 158573 On landing, the aircraft overrun runway and lost its right landing gear. Nobody was injured but the aircraft was damaged beyond repair.
- 22 May 2011: Twenty Tehrik-i-Taliban Pakistan militants claiming to avenge Osama bin Laden's death destroyed two Pakistan Navy P-3Cs during an armed attack at PNS Mehran, a Pakistan Navy base in Karachi. They had been frequently used to conduct overland counter-insurgency surveillance operations.
- 15 February 2014: Three USN P-3Cs were crushed beyond repair when their hangar, at NAF Atsugi, Japan, was destroyed by a massive snow storm.
- 29 May 2025: A P-3 Orion of the Republic of Korea Navy crashed in the southern city of Pohang in South Korea. All four crew members on board died in the crash.

== Preserved aircraft ==
- 150509 – P-3A – Moffett Field Historical Society (former NAS Moffett Field), California.
- 151370 – P–3A Cockpit – Moffett Field Historical Society (former NAS Moffett Field), California.
- 150511 – VP-3A – Pima Air and Space Museum, adjacent to Davis-Monthan AFB, Tucson, Arizona. Aircraft last assigned to Executive Transport Det, NAS Signonella, Sicily
- 151374 – P-3A – NAS Jacksonville Heritage Park, NAS Jacksonville, Florida
- 152152 – P-3A – National Naval Aviation Museum, NAS Pensacola, Florida. Aircraft last assigned to VP-69.
- 152156 – P-3A – Brunswick Executive Airport (former NAS Brunswick), Maine
- 152184 – VP-3T – U-Tapao RTAFB, Thailand. Former US Navy aircraft, transferred to, operated by and later retired as gate guard by Royal Thai Navy.
- 152729 – P-3B – U.S. Customs and Border Protection, Washington, D.C. Registered as N769SK.
- 152748 – P-3B – Navy Operational Support Center (formerly Naval Air Facility Detroit), Selfridge ANGB, Michigan. Aircraft last assigned to VP-93.
- 152888 - P-3K2 - RNZAF 4203 Retired September 2023 gifted to Air Force Museum of New Zealand
- 154574 - P-3B - Wings of Freedom Aviation Museum, adjacent to Horsham Air National Guard Station (former NAS/JRB Willow Grove), Horsham, Pennsylvania
- 160770 – P-3C CDU – Naval Air Museum Barbers Point, Kalaeloa Airport (former Naval Air Station Barbers Point), Hawaii. Aircraft last assigned to VP-9, but carrying 1960s era markings of VP-6 for U.S. Naval Aviation Centennial celebration in 2011.
- 156515 – P-3C Hickory Aviation Museum, at Hickory Regional Airport, Hickory North Carolina.
- 160753 – AP-3C – Historical Aircraft Restoration Society, Shellharbour Airport, New South Wales, Australia. Ex-Royal Australian Air Force A9-753, former 10 Squadron aircraft and later 292 Squadron as a static training aid. Officially handed over to HARS by the RAAF on 3 November 2017. Civil registered as VH-ORI and will be maintained as a flying warbird.
- 160756 – AP-3C – South Australian Aviation Museum, South Australia. Construction number 5666, RAAF A9-756, received by 10 Squadron as a P-3C in 1978, upgraded to AP-3C in early 2000s.
- 160999 – P-3C UD II – Marine Corps Air Station Kaneohe Bay, Hawaii. Aircraft last assigned to VP-9.
- 161006 – P-3C UD II – Joint Base Andrews (former Naval Air Facility Washington), Maryland. Aircraft last assigned to VP-68.
- 162776 - P-3C AIP+ - National Naval Aviation Museum, NAS Pensacola, Florida. Aircraft last assigned to VP-40.

For Canadian aircraft on display, see Lockheed CP-140 Aurora.

== Specifications (P-3C Orion) ==
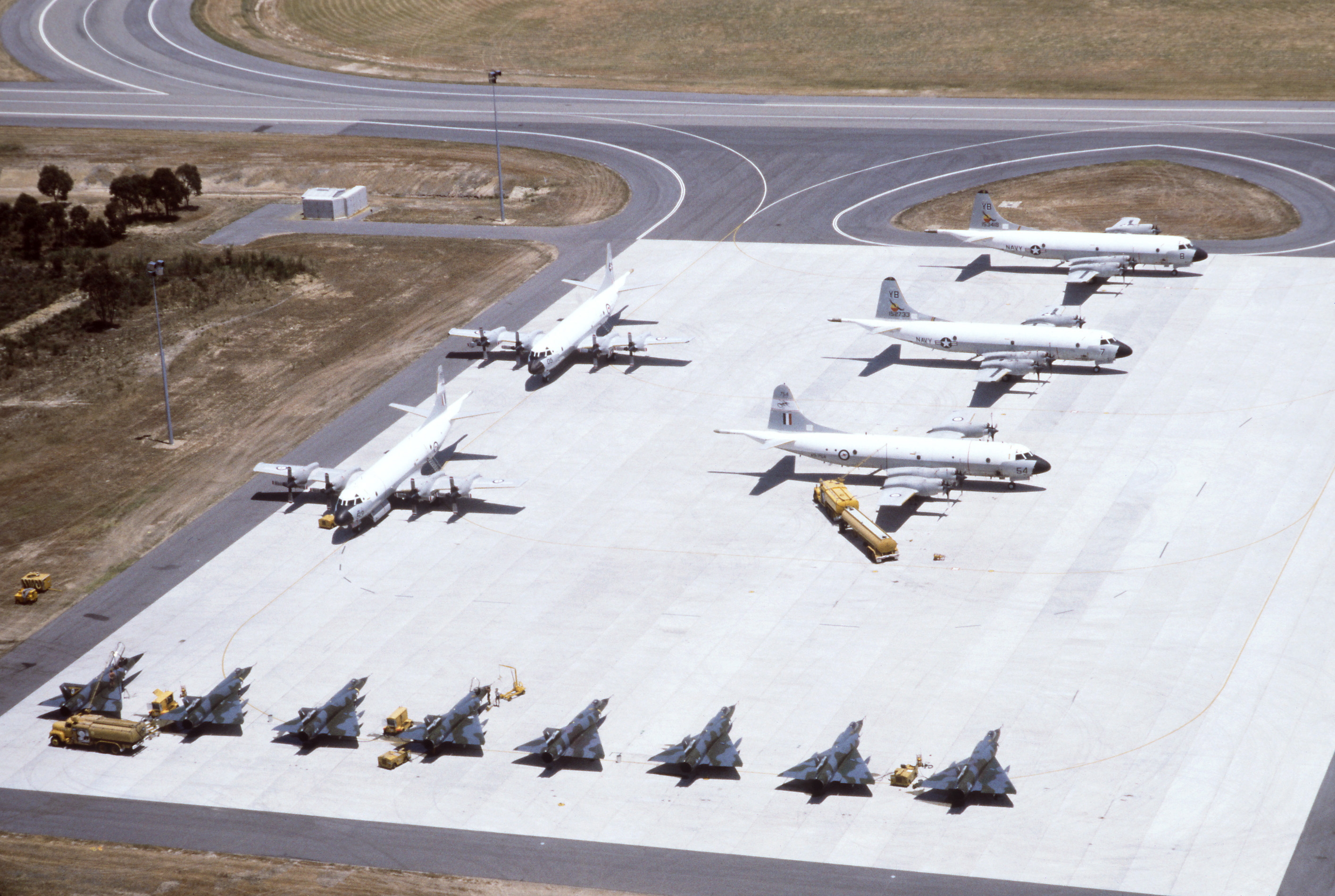
P-3 aircraft of the Royal New Zealand Air Force, Royal Australian Air Force, and the United States Navy (with RAAF Dassault Mirage III)

Data from Jane's All the World's Aircraft 1994-95, Specifications: P-3,

General characteristics

- Crew: 11
- Length: 116 ft 10 in (35.61 m)
- Wingspan: 99 ft 8 in (30.38 m)
- Height: 33 ft 8.5 in (10.274 m)
- Wing area: 1,300.0 sq ft (120.77 m^{2})
- Aspect ratio: 7.5
- Airfoil: root: NACA 0014 modified; tip: NACA 0012 modified
- Empty weight: 61,491 lb (27,892 kg)
- Zero-fuel weight: 77,200 lb (35,017 kg)
- Max takeoff weight: 135,000 lb (61,235 kg) MTOW normal

142,000 lb (64,410 kg) maximum permissible

- Maximum landing weight: (MLW) 103,880 lb (47,119 kg)
- Fuel capacity: 9,200 US gal (7,700 imp gal; 35,000 L) usable fuel in 5 wing and fuselage tanks; (62,500 lb (28,350 kg) maximum fuel weight); 111 US gal (92 imp gal; 420 L) usable oil in 4 tanks
- Powerplant: 4 × Allison T56-A-14 turboprop engines, 4,910 shp (3,660 kW) each (equivalent)
- Propellers: 4-bladed Hamilton Standard 54H60-77, 13 ft 6 in (4.11 m) diameter constant-speed fully-feathering reversible propellers

Performance

- Maximum speed: 411 kn (473 mph, 761 km/h) at 15,000 ft (4,600 m) and 105,000 lb (48,000 kg)
- Cruise speed: 328 kn (377 mph, 607 km/h) at 25,000 ft (7,600 m) and 110,000 lb (50,000 kg)
- Patrol speed: 206 kn (237 mph; 382 km/h) at 1,500 ft (460 m) and 110,000 lb (50,000 kg)
- Stall speed: 133 kn (153 mph, 246 km/h) flaps up

112 kn (129 mph; 207 km/h) flaps down

- Combat range: 1,345 nmi (1,548 mi, 2,491 km) (3 hours on station at 1,500 ft (460 m))
- Ferry range: 4,830 nmi (5,560 mi, 8,950 km)
- Endurance: 17 hours 12 minutes at 15,000 ft (4,600 m) on two engines

12 hours 20 minutes at 15,000 ft (4,600 m) on four engines

- Service ceiling: 28,300 ft (8,600 m)

19,000 ft (5,791 m) one engine inoperative (OEI)

- Rate of climb: 1,950 ft/min (9.9 m/s)
- Time to altitude: 25,000 ft (7,600 m) in 30 minutes
- Wing loading: 103.8 lb/sq ft (507 kg/m^{2})
- Power/mass: 0.1455 hp/lb (0.2392 kW/kg) (equivalent)
- Take-off run: 4,240 ft (1,290 m)
- Take-off distance to 50 ft (15 m): 5,490 ft (1,670 m)
- Landing distance from 50 ft (15 m): 2,770 ft (840 m)

Armament

- Hardpoints: 10 wing stations in total (3x on each wing and 2x on each wing root) and eight internal bomb bay stations with a capacity of 20,000 lb (9,100 kg), with provisions to carry combinations of:
  - Rockets: None
  - Missiles:
    - Air-to-surface missile:4×AGM-65 Maverick, 6×AGM-84 Harpoon, 4×AGM-84 Standoff Land Attack Missile (SLAM-ER)
  - Bombs:
    - Depth charges, Mk 101 Lulu nuclear depth bomb,10×Mk 20 Rockeye, Mark 80 Series (18×MK82, MK83, MK84) general-purpose bombs, B57 nuclear bomb (US service only, retired 1993)
  - Other:
    - Mk 44 (mostly retired from service), 8× Mk 46, 6× Mk 50, 7× Mk 54 or MU90 Impact torpedoes
    - Mk 25, Mk 39, Mk 55, 7× Mk 56, Mk 60 CAPTOR or 6× Mk 65 or 18× Mk 62 or 11×Mk 63 Quickstrike naval mines
    - Active and passive Sonobuoys

Avionics

- RADAR: Raytheon AN/APS-115 Maritime Surveillance Radar, AN/APS-137D(V)5 Inverse Synthetic Aperture Search Radar
- IFF: APX-72, APX-76, APX-118/123 Interrogation Friend or Foe (IFF)
- EO/IR: ASX-4 Advanced Imaging Multispectral Sensor (AIMS), ASX-6 Multi-Mode Imaging System (MMIS)
- ESM: ALR-66 Radar Warning Receiver, ALR-95(V)2 Specific Emitter Identification/Threat Warning
- Hazeltine Corporation AN/ARR-78(V) sonobuoy receiving system
- Fighting Electronics Inc AN/ARR-72 sonobuoy receiver
- IBM Proteus UYS-1 acoustic processor
- AQA-7 directional acoustic frequency analysis and recording sonobuoy indicators
- AQH-4 (V) sonar tape recorder
- ASQ-81 magnetic anomaly detector (MAD)
- ASA-65 magnetic compensator
- Lockheed Martin AN/ALQ-78(V) electronic surveillance receiver

== See also ==
- Lockheed P-2 Neptune
- Martin P-5 Marlin

Related development

- Lockheed CP-140 Aurora
- Lockheed EP-3
- Lockheed L-188 Electra
- Lockheed P-7
- Lockheed WP-3D Orion

Aircraft of comparable role, configuration, and era

- ATR 72MP
- Avro Shackleton
- Boeing P-8 Poseidon
- Bombardier Aerospace DHC-8-MPA-D8
- Breguet Atlantique
- Canadair CP-107 Argus
- CASA CN-235 MPA
- CASA C-295 MPA
- EADS HC-144 Ocean Sentry
- Hawker-Siddeley Nimrod
- Ilyushin Il-38
- Kawasaki P-1
- Shin Meiwa PS-1

Related lists

- List of Lockheed P-3 Orion variants
- List of military aircraft of the United States
- List of active United States military aircraft
- List of Lockheed aircraft
- List of military electronics of the United States
