= Airbus Military =

Former business unit of Airbus, which was part of the EADS conglomerate

- Industry: Defense
- Predecessor: Aérospatiale-Matra, DASA, and CASA
- Founded: 2009; 17 years ago
- Defunct: January 2014
- Fate: Reorganised
- Successor: Airbus Defence and Space
- Headquarters: Madrid, Spain
- Key people: Domingo Ureña-Raso (CEO, 2009-2014)
- Products: Military aircraft
- Parent: Airbus S.A.S., EADS
- Website: www.airbusmilitary.com

Airbus Military was a business unit of Airbus, which was part of European Aeronautic Defence and Space Company (EADS) from 2009 to 2013.

The company was formally created in April 2009 by the integration of the former Military Transport Aircraft Division (MTAD) and Airbus Military Sociedad Limitada (AMSL) into Airbus. In January 2014, former EADS divisions Airbus Military, Astrium, and Cassidian merged to form Airbus Defence and Space.

== History ==
The predecessor company, headquartered in Blagnac, was established in January 1999 as Airbus Military Company SAS, to manage the Airbus A400M project, taking over from the Euroflag consortium. In May 2003, the company was restructured as Airbus Military Sociedad Limitada (AMSL) prior to the contract being awarded and its headquarters moved to Madrid, Spain.

The Military Transport Aircraft Division (MTAD) was a division of EADS which designed, manufactured and sold EADS-CASA light and medium transport aircraft, headquartered in Madrid, Spain.

On 16 December 2008, EADS announced that MTAD and AMSL would be integrated into Airbus as part of Airbus Military.

In February 2009, Domingo Ureña-Raso was appointed chair and CEO of Airbus Military.

On July 31, 2013, parent company EADS announced its reorganization as the Airbus Group. Airbus Military, Astrium, and Cassidian were merged and reorganized to form a new division: Airbus Defence and Space, marking the end of the Airbus Military corporate entity. Airbus Group's two other divisions are Airbus and Airbus Helicopters

=== Evolution ===
Structural evolution of Airbus SE
Dec 1970
Jan 1992
July 2000
Sep 2000
Jan 2001
Dec 2006
Apr 2009
Sep 2010
Jan 2014
May 2015
Jan 2017
Apr 2017

European Aeronautic Defence and Space Company NV
Airbus Group NV
Airbus Group SE
Airbus SE

Airbus Industrie GIE
Airbus SAS

Airbus Military SAS
Airbus Defence and Space SAS

EADS Defence and Security
Cassidian SAS

Astrium SAS
EADS Astrium SAS

Eurocopter SA
Eurocopter SAS
Airbus Helicopters SAS

== Products ==
- Airbus A330 MRTT
- Airbus A400M
- CASA C-212 Aviocar
- CASA/IPTN CN-235
- EADS CASA C-295

== Gallery ==
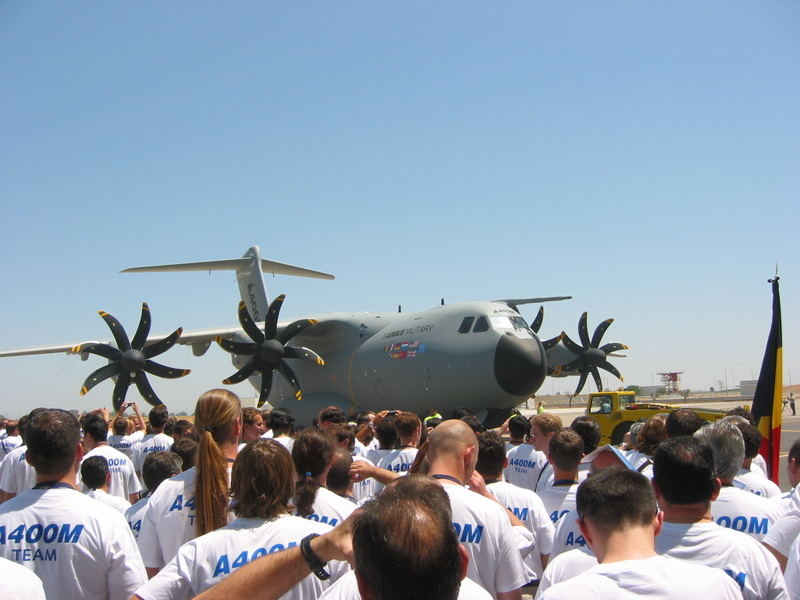
First Airbus A400M roll-out in Seville in June 2008

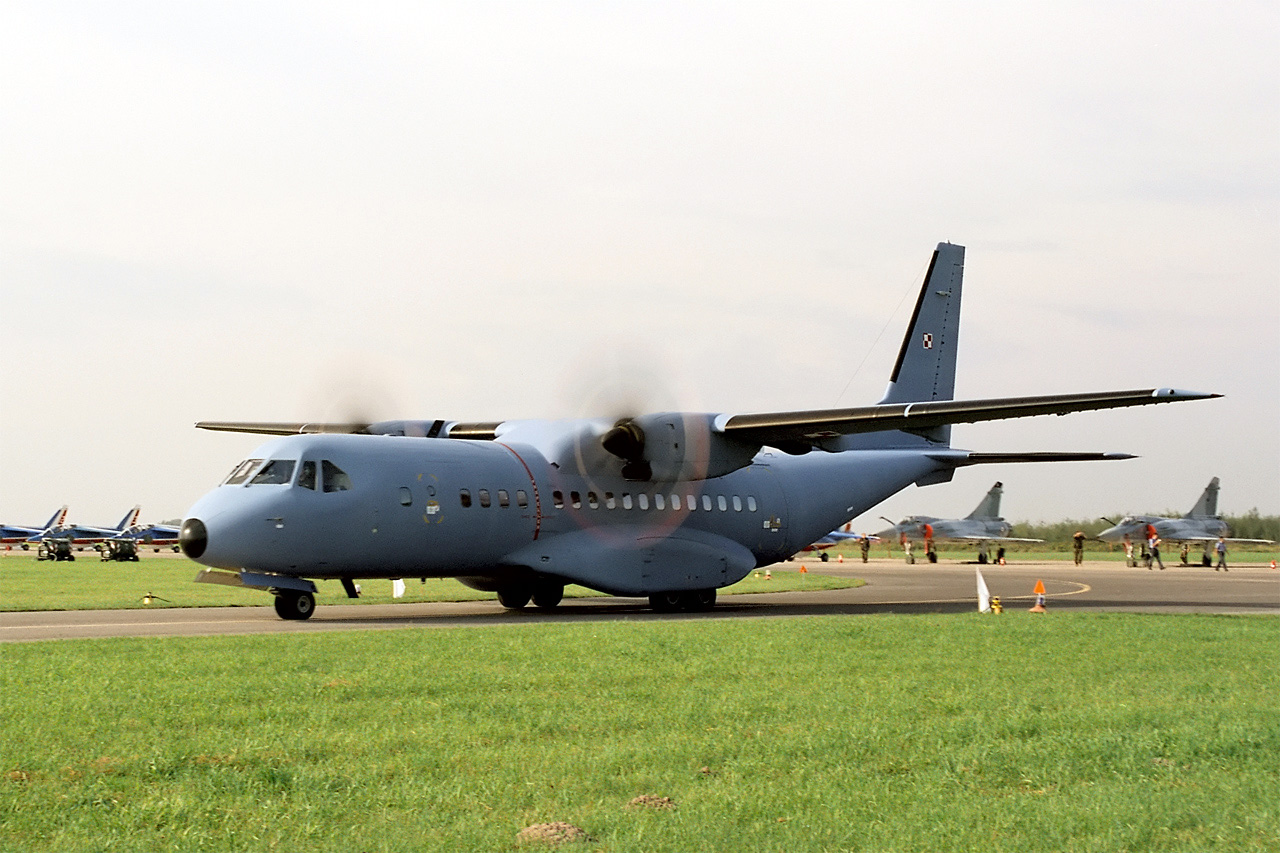
CASA C-295 of the Polish Air Force

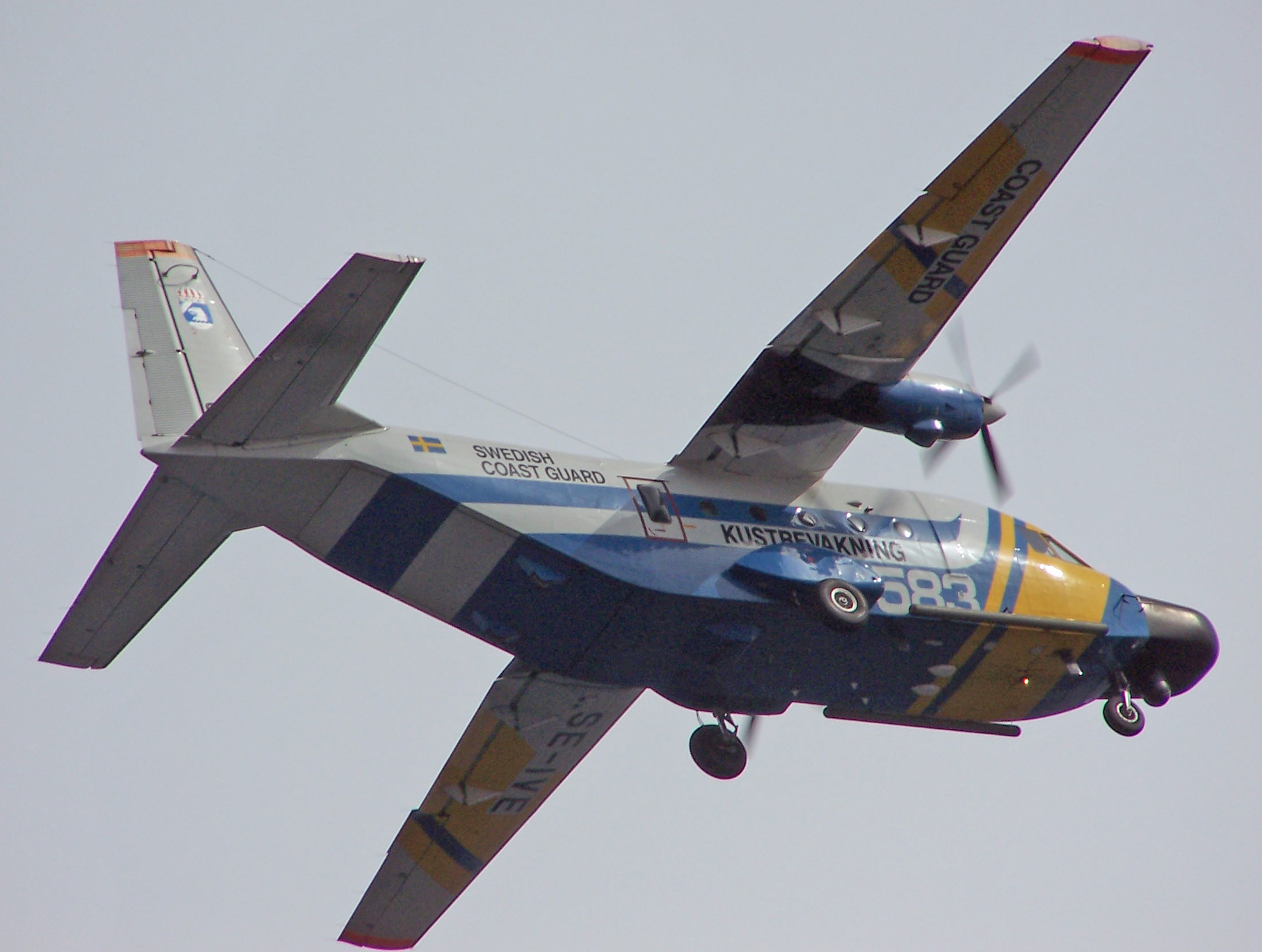
CASA C-212 of the Swedish Coast Guard

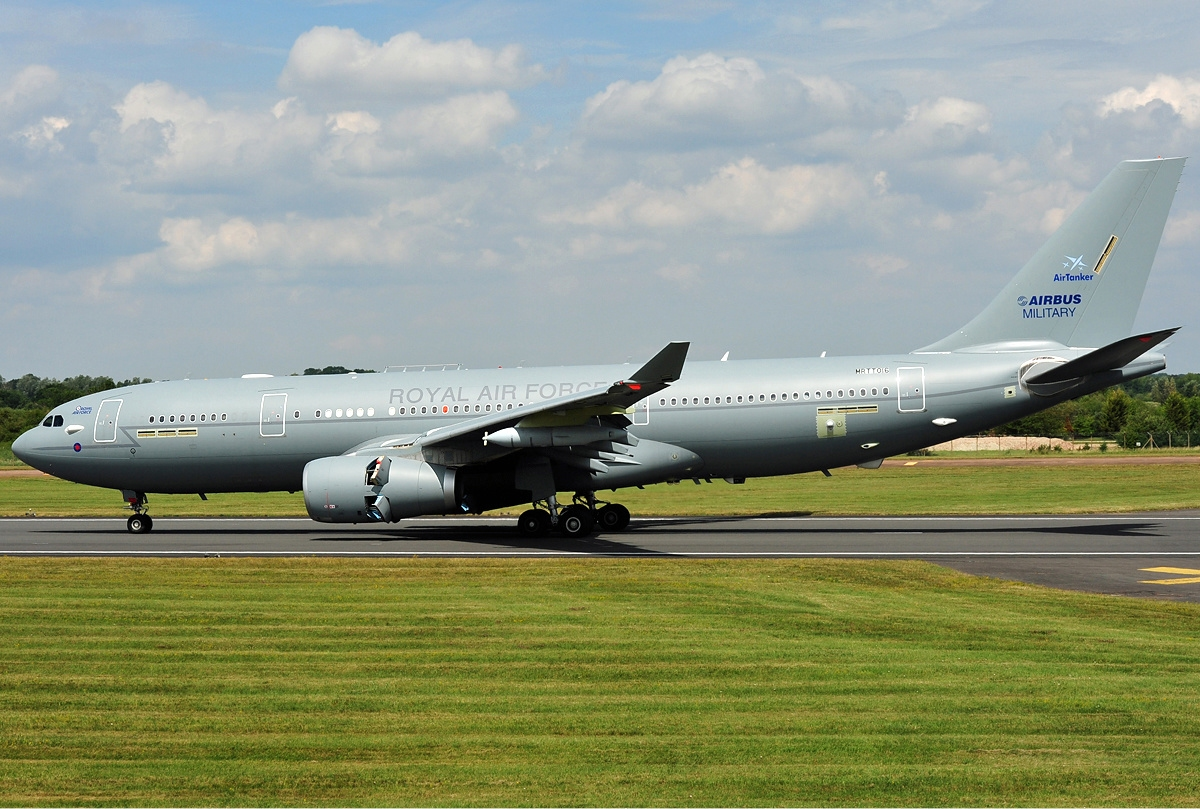
A330MRTT of the Royal Air Force

== See also ==
- CASA FITS
