= Euroflag =

- Industry: Aerospace
- Predecessor: FIMA
- Founded: Mid-1989
- Defunct: January 1999
- Successor: Airbus Military Company SAS; Airbus Military Sociedad Limitada; Airbus Military; Airbus Defence and Space
- Headquarters: Rome, Italy
- Products: Future Large Aircraft

Euroflag was a collaboration of European aerospace companies formed for the development of the Future Large Aircraft project which was eventually to result in the Airbus A400M Atlas. Development eventually moved under the stewardship of Airbus Defence and Space.

== History ==
=== Origins ===
The project began as the Future International Military Airlifter (FIMA) group. A memorandum of understanding (MoU) was set up on 16 December 1982 by France's Aérospatiale, British Aerospace, Lockheed of the United States, and West Germany's Messerschmitt-Bölkow-Blohm to develop a replacement for the C-130 Hercules and C-160 Transall. Varying requirements and the complications of international politics caused slow progress. A new FIMA agreement was created with the four original participants and new members Aeritalia (predecessor of Italy's Alenia Aeronautica) and Spain's Construcciones Aeronáuticas SA (CASA) on 3 December 1987, which was the expiration date of the original FIMA agreement. By May 1989, Lockheed was deep into the planning of a second-generation C-130 that would become a competitor to a FIMA aircraft (the C-130J Super Hercules) despite having invested over US$60 million in FIMA-related studies. On 6 June 1989, Aérospatiale announced that the five European members had formed Euroflag to replace FIMA, and that Lockheed was no longer a participant to create the new military transport because the other members did not want to commit to a specific American partner yet.

=== Formation ===
In July 1991, with the addition of Alenia Aeronautica, CASA, OGMA, and TAI of Turkey, the Future International Military Airlifter group became Euroflag, European future large aircraft group. a joint-venture company based in Rome.

=== Succession ===
1995 saw the FLA military transport project in charge of requirement-definition and selection processes, with Airbus Military eventually taking over the project.

== Participants ==
- Aerospatiale (France)
- Alenia Aeronautica (Italy)
- British Aerospace (United Kingdom)
- CASA (Spain)
- Deutsche Airbus (Germany)
- OGMA (Portugal)
- SONACA (Belgium)
- SABCA (Belgium)
- TAI (Turkey)

== Sources ==
- Betts, Paul (13 June 1989). "Lockheed sets new sights on Europe: US company signs long-term deal with Aerospatiale". World trade news. Financial Times. No. 30867. p. 8. ISSN 0307-1766.
- "European companies restructure FIMA transport team". Paris Air Show 1989. Aviation Week & Space Technology. 12 June 1989. p. 66. ISSN 0005-2175.
- Nini, Markus; Kübler, Klaus (January 2013). "3. Between Requirement and Reality: déjà-vu A400M" (PDF). Are large projects in the aerospace and armaments industries still manageable?. Cooperational Excellence (Report). Archived (PDF) from the original on 22 September 2019.
