= CASA FITS =

CASA FITS (fully integrated tactical system) is a system that is used on board aircraft from different coast guard services for tactical marine reconnaissance. FITS is predestined for this area of application due to its real-time display of navigation data. FITS was developed by the Spanish branch of the multinational Military Transport Aircraft Division of EADS.

== Areas of application ==
In addition to tactical marine reconnaissance, FITS is deployed over a wide range of other operational areas: In internal security, border security or for coordination of police missions. It supports operational forces in drug investigations, immigration control and also in protecting natural resources. For example, FITS can be used to monitor fishing grounds or exclusive economic zones, to provide early warning of marine pollution incidents or to coordinate search and rescue services.

== Mode of operation ==
In missions of this nature, FITS integrates large volumes of information and also evaluates potential threats at the same time. An intuitive man-machine interface forms the core of the modular FITS. This interface significantly enhances mission efficiency. Apart from numerous operational sensors, this system comprises an aircraft navigation and communication system. Each system is controlled by an operator using one of four multifunction consoles. The consoles are linked together via a high-speed LAN (local area network) with central processors which facilitate fast processing of all incoming signals. Despite the high level of complexity, the acquisition costs for FITS are low, particularly as commercial hardware, standard interfaces and modular software are used. Something that initially sounds mass-produced is actually the trump card for this system. This is because using standardized components is the only way of integrating such a large number of sensors within a system of this nature. These standards also provide the potential for expansion and this is what ultimately ensures the projected service life of a marine reconnaissance aircraft over several decades. Depending on technical progress, this design allows numerous other sensors to be integrated within the FITS system in the future.

== Orders ==
FITS is a proven system: The Spanish Armed Forces are already deploying it in the modernized P-3 Fleet and the Mexican Navy has installed the system in its C-212 aircraft. Since the start of 2001, this tactical system has also been in operation on board a C-295. Other FITS orders are for the CN aircraft of the Spanish “Sasemar” air-sea rescue service, the CN-235 operated by the Irish Air Corps and the C-295 aircraft of the Portuguese Air Force. But FITS is now part of the standard equipment of reconnaissance aircraft on the other side of the Atlantic: The CN-235 aircraft of the US Coast Guard are also equipped with FITS technology.

== Visualization ==
The key link between users and the information provided by the system is ILOG visualization technology, specifically ILOG Views. Apart from the symbology, ILOG Views provides the text menus for controlling the sensors, as well as the captured video data and the cartography of the mission area. The graphics can be easily adapted, intuitively controlled and hence form one of the keys for the flexibility of FITS. Without this flexibility, the reaction time of the crew would be substantially longer and the entire system would be much less suitable, for example, in the deployment of marine patrols. A key factor in the decision by EADS to adopt ILOG Views was the same reason governing the entire development of FITS. All the systems included are equipped with standard interfaces so that further development is possible at a later date with relatively little expenditure.
