= Reentry Breakup Recorder =

Black box for intentionally destroyed spacecraft

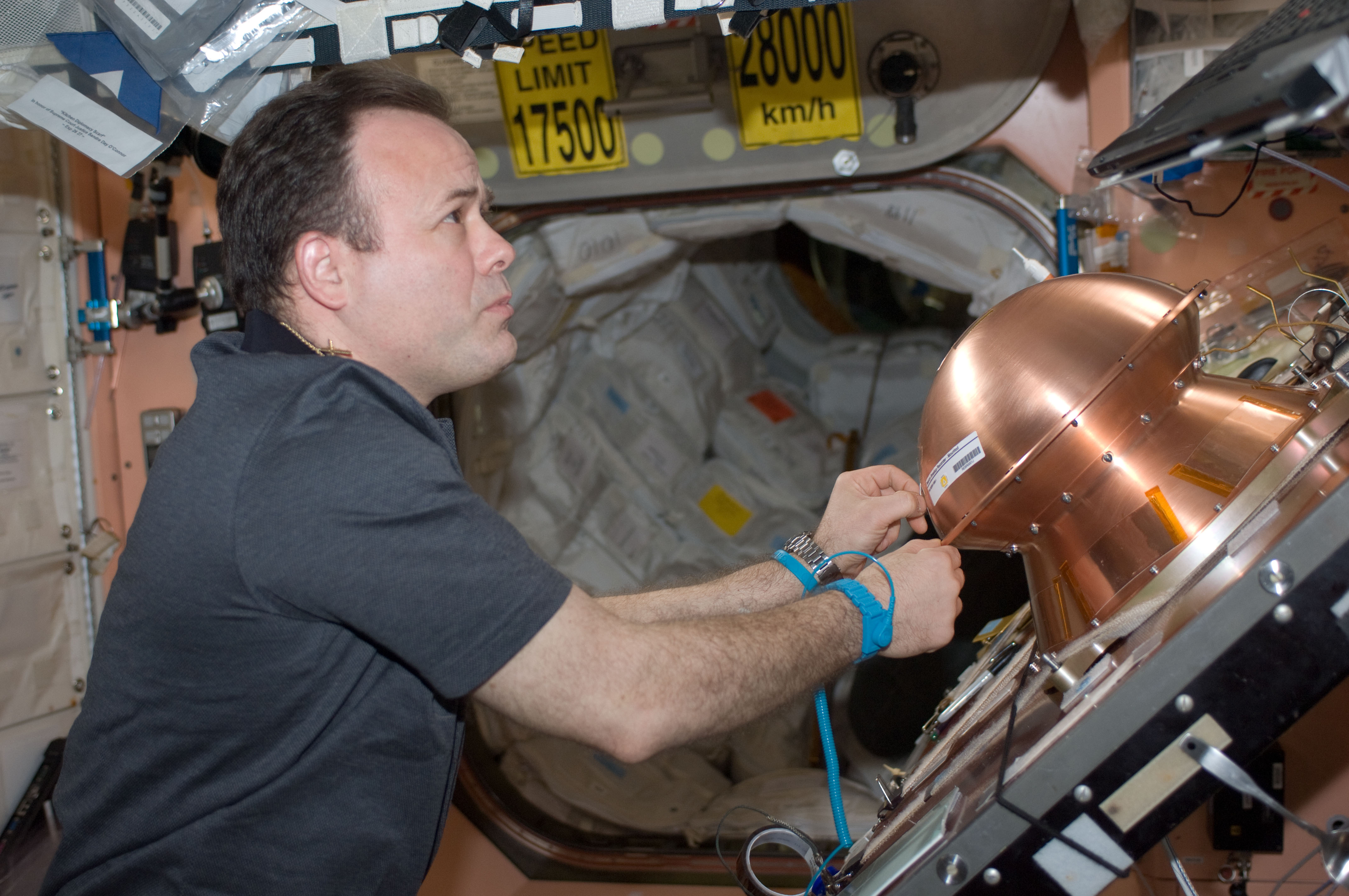
Ron Garan, ISS Expedition 28 flight engineer, prepares the Reentry Breakup Recorder (REBR) for installation in the Automated Transfer Vehicle-2 (ATV-2) in 2011.

A Reentry Breakup Recorder (REBR) is a device that is designed to be placed aboard a spacecraft to record pertinent data when the spacecraft (intentionally) breaks up as it re-enters Earth's atmosphere.

The device records data regarding the thermal, acceleration, rotational and other stresses the vehicle is subject to. In the final stages it transmits the data back to a laboratory before it is destroyed when it hits the surface.

== History ==
Two REBRs were launched in January 2011 on the Japanese Kounotori 2 transfer vehicle. One recorded the subsequent re-entry of that vehicle, and the other was placed aboard the Johannes Kepler ATV, which reentered Earth's atmosphere on 21 June 2011.

The Kounotori 2 vehicle re-entered on 30 March 2011. Its REBR successfully collected and returned its data; it survived the impact with the ocean and while floating continued to transmit. It took between 6 and 8 weeks to analyze the data.

The second unit was intended to collect data during the reentry of the Johannes Kepler ATV (ATV-2); however the device failed to make contact after reentry and consequently no data was retrieved.

Two other units were used successfully for Kounotori 3 for its reentry on September 14, 2012, and Edoardo Amaldi ATV (ATV-3) on October 3, 2012.

== Predecessor technology: image documentation of reentry and breakup ==
Earlier data collection from reentry and breakup was mostly visual and spectrographic. A particularly well-documented case is seen in a reentry and breakup over the South Pacific—recorded by a large team of NASA and ESA space agency personnel with extensive photographic image and video data collection, at multiple spectrographic wavelengths—occurred in September 2008, following the first mission of the ESA cargo spacecraft—the Automated Transfer Vehicle Jules Verne—to the International Space Station (ISS) in March 2008.

On 5 September 2008, Jules Verne undocked from the ISS and maneuvered to an orbital position 5 kilometres (3.1 mi) below the ISS. It remained in that orbit until the night of 29 September. At 10:00:27 UTC, Jules Verne started its first de-orbit burn of 6 minutes, followed by a second burn of 15 minutes at 12:58:18 UTC. At 13:31 GMT, Jules Verne re-entered the atmosphere at an altitude of 120 kilometres (75 mi), and then completed its destructive re-entry as planned over the following 12 minutes, depositing debris in the South Pacific Ocean southwest of Tahiti. This was recorded with video and still photography at night by two aircraft flying over the South Pacific for purposes of data gathering.

The NASA documentary of the project is in the gallery, below.

== Gallery ==
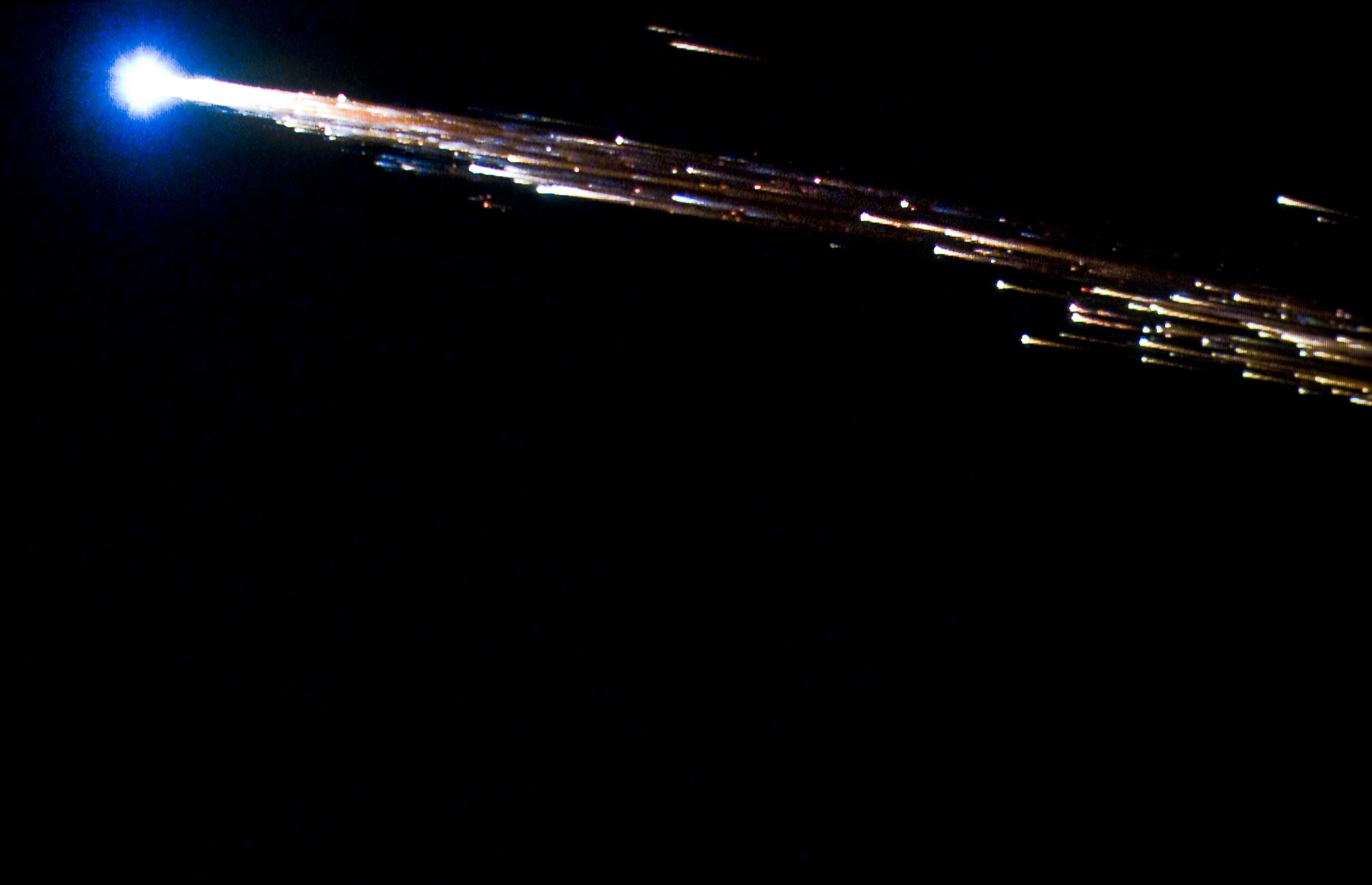
Jules Verne re-enters the Earth's atmosphere southwest of Tahiti, September, 2008.

Behind the scenes of the ATV re-entry observation team. NASA, 2008
