= Albert Einstein ATV =

2013 International Space Station resupply flight

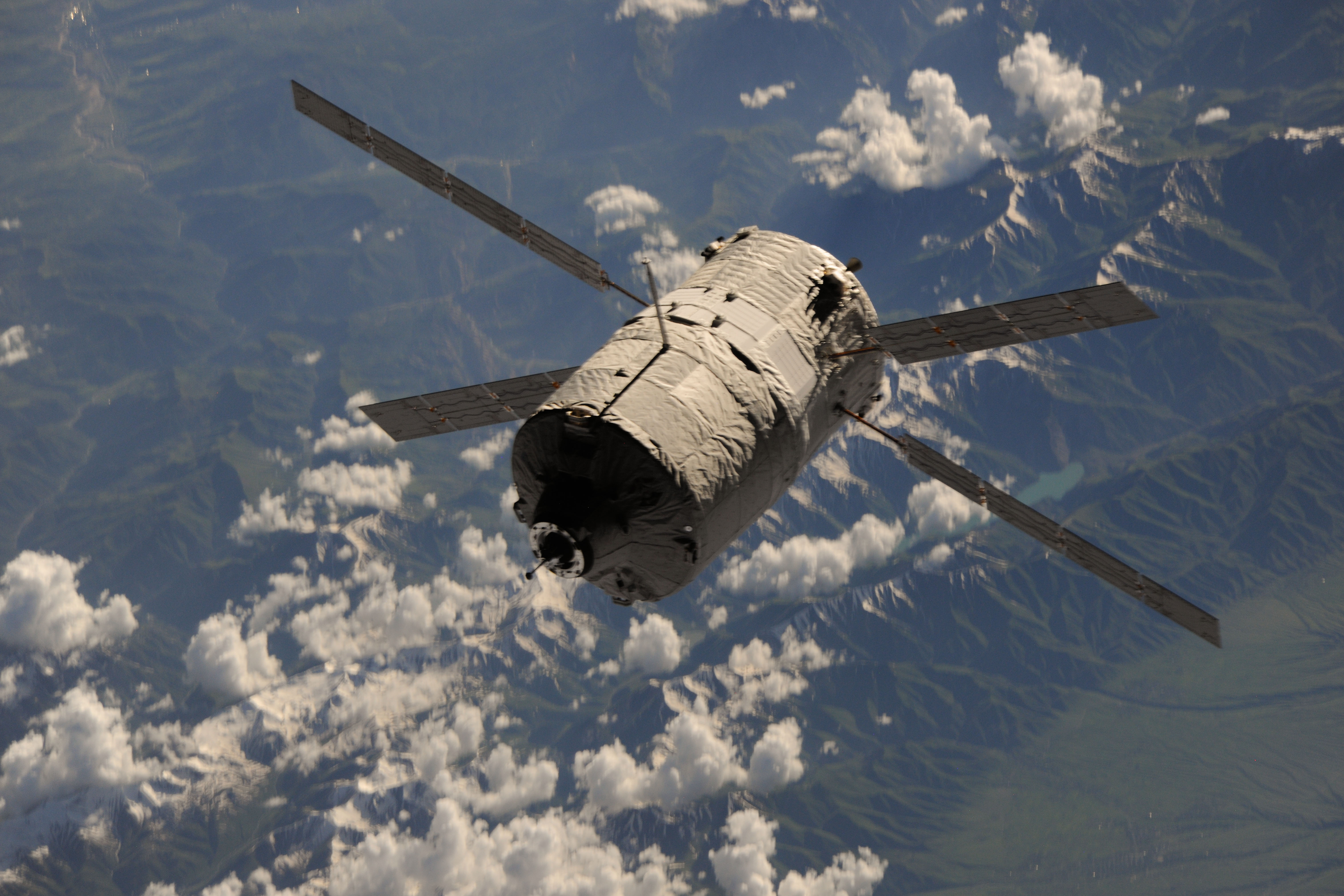
- ATV-4 Albert Einstein approaching the Zvezda Service Module on 15 June 2013
- Mission type: ISS resupply
- Operator: European Space Agency
- COSPAR ID: 2013-027A
- SATCAT no.: 39175
- Mission duration: 4 months

Spacecraft properties
- Spacecraft type: ATV
- Manufacturer: EADS Astrium; Thales Alenia Space
- Launch mass: 20,190 kilograms (44,510 lb)

Start of mission
- Launch date: 5 June 2013, 21:52:11 UTC
- Rocket: Ariane 5ES
- Launch site: Kourou ELA-3
- Contractor: Arianespace

End of mission
- Disposal: Deorbited
- Decay date: 2 November 2013, 12:04 UTC

Orbital parameters
- Reference system: Geocentric
- Regime: Low Earth
- Inclination: 51.6 degrees

Docking with ISS
- Docking port: Zvezda Aft
- Docking date: 15 June 2013, 14:07 UTC
- Undocking date: 28 October 2013, 08:55 UTC
- Time docked: 134 days, 18 hours, 48 minutes

Cargo
- Mass: 6,590 kilograms (14,530 lb)

The Albert Einstein ATV, or Automated Transfer Vehicle 004 (ATV-004), was a European uncrewed cargo resupply spacecraft, named after the German-born physicist Albert Einstein. It was built to supply the International Space Station (ISS) with propellant, water, air, and dry cargo, and also to reboost the station's altitude with its thrusters. It was the fourth and penultimate ATV to be built, following the Edoardo Amaldi, which was launched in March 2012. Albert Einstein's components were constructed in Turin, Italy, and Bremen, Germany, and underwent final assembly and testing in Bremen in 2012. The spacecraft left Bremen for Kourou on 29 August 2012 to begin launch preparations.

Albert Einstein was launched on an Ariane 5ES rocket from the Guiana Space Centre in Kourou, French Guiana at 21:52:11 UTC on 5 June 2013. The launch was conducted by Arianespace on behalf of the European Space Agency (ESA). At the time of its launch, Albert Einstein was the heaviest spacecraft ever launched to orbit by an Ariane rocket, with a total mass of 20,190 kilograms (44,510 lb). The ATV docked successfully with the ISS at 14:07 UTC (16:07 CEST) on 15 June 2013. After a successful five-month mission, Albert Einstein re-entered the Earth's atmosphere and was destroyed, as planned, on 2 November 2013.

== Mission payload ==
The Albert Einstein supplied the ISS with dry cargo, fuel, water and air to ensure the continued operation of the station. In addition, the ATV used its own thrusters and fuel supply to reboost the ISS, to counteract the drag the residual atmosphere imposes on the station. The total cost of the Albert Einstein mission was approximately 450 million euros.

At the time of its launch, the Albert Einstein held the record for:

- Most dry cargo launched in any European spacecraft – 2,480 kilograms (5,470 lb);
- Most diverse cargo mix aboard a spacecraft – 1,400 different items;
- Largest quantity of late cargo (cargo added only two weeks before launch, while Albert Einstein was already mated to the top of the Ariane 5 rocket) – 620 kilograms (1,370 lb).

A full cargo breakdown is provided in the following table:

| Cargo | Mass |
|---|---|
| ISS reboost/attitude control propellant | 2,580 kilograms (5,690 lb) |
| ISS refuel propellant | 860 kilograms (1,900 lb) |
| Water (for Russian Segment) | 570 kilograms (1,260 lb) |
| Gas (1 tank O2, 2 tanks air) | 100 kilograms (220 lb) |
| Dry cargo (food, clothes, equipment) | 2,480 kilograms (5,470 lb) |
| Total | 6,590 kilograms (14,530 lb) |

Source: ESA

== Mission summary ==
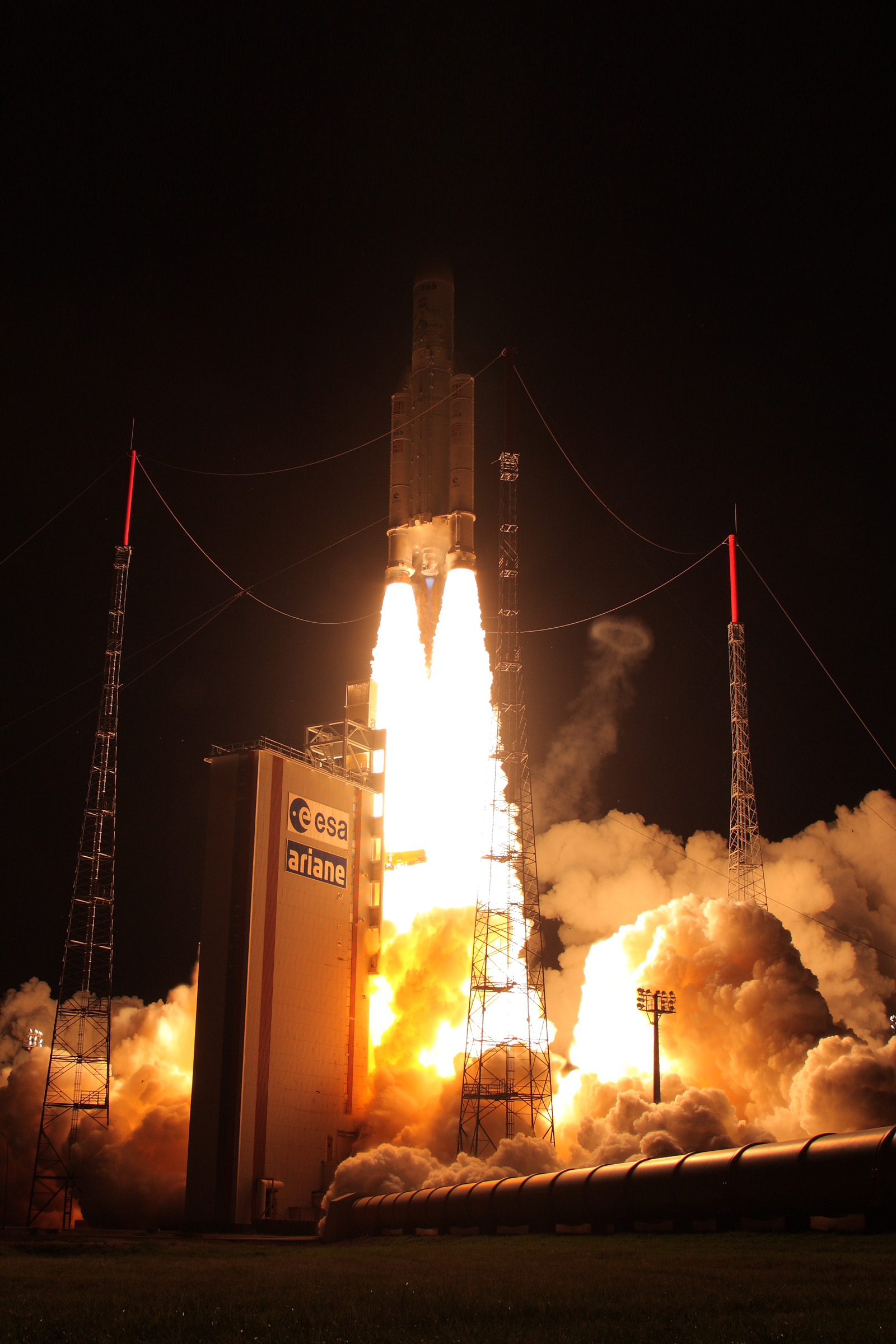
The launch of ATV-4 on an Ariane 5ES rocket on 5 June 2013

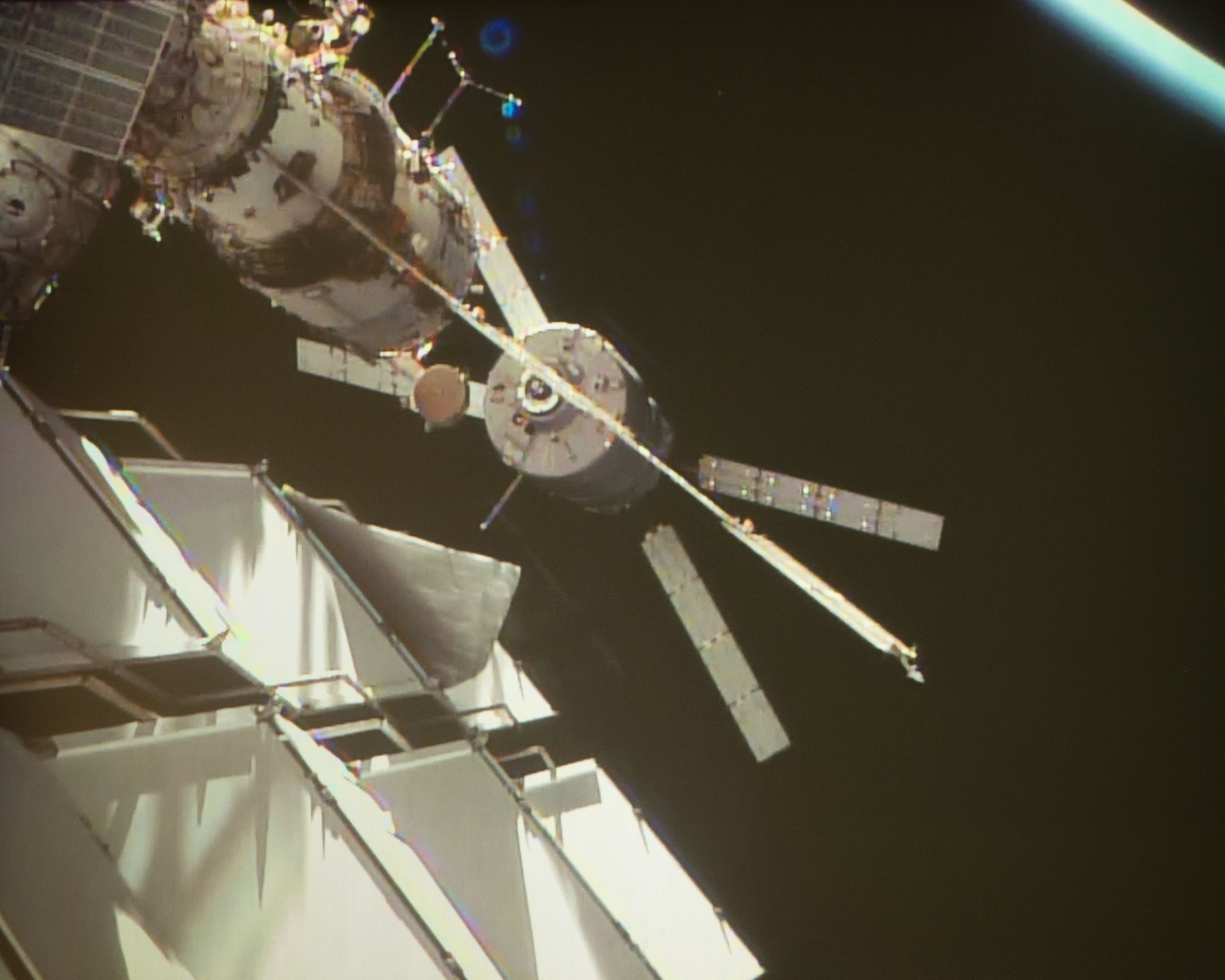
ATV-4 approaches the ISS on 15 June 2013 to dock with the Zvezda module.

=== Launch ===
Albert Einstein arrived at the Guiana Space Centre in Kourou, French Guiana, in September 2012. It was launched successfully on an Ariane 5ES rocket at 21:52:11 UTC (23:52:11 CEST) on 5 June 2013.

=== Cruise ===
After launch, Albert Einstein spent ten days conducting orbital manoeuvres before docking with the ISS. This time frame was chosen for logistical rather than technological reasons – the ATV is capable of docking with the station five days after launch, as demonstrated by the Edoardo Amaldi ATV in 2012, but the launch from Kourou could not occur later, as the launch pad was required for subsequent commercial launches. In addition, docking with the ISS could not occur before 11 June, as the Zvezda port (where the Albert Einstein docked) was occupied by Progress 51. After Progress 51 departed on 11 June, cameras on the ISS checked the Zvezda docking port to ensure that no damage was caused when Progress 51 docked with the station, as it had a stuck navigation antenna which could have potentially damaged the docking port. No damage to the docking port was detected, and so the ATV's docking proceeded as planned.

=== Docking ===
The ATV docked successfully with the ISS at 14:07 UTC (16:07 CEST) on 15 June 2013 and the hatch was opened on 18 June. The hatch opening was delayed by a day due to concerns raised by Roscosmos that the cargo had not been disinfected satisfactorily.

=== Reboost and docked operations ===
On 19 June 2013, Albert Einstein conducted its first reboost of the ISS, performing a 407-second burn which provided a delta-v change of 1.0 m/s to the station. A further reboost was undertaken on 10 July 2013, where a burn of just less than 10 minutes provided a delta-v change of 1.45 m/s; this operation consumed 199 kilograms (439 lb) of propellant. By 12 July 2013, all the dry cargo had been unloaded from Albert Einstein, allowing the ATV to be filled with waste for removal from the station.

On 23 and 28 July Albert Einstein suffered a transient fault with two of its three computers, numbers 2 and 3. While only a single computer was required to operate the ATV, two out of the three were required for any "mission critical" operations. However, by 29 July a restart had been performed on both units, bringing all three of the ATV's computers back on-line without impacting the mission schedule. Transfer of fuel and oxidiser from the ATV to the Russian segment of the ISS took place on 1 August 2013 in an operation that took approximately 1.5 hours; this fuel allowed the ISS to adjust its orbit in the absence of docked vessels to perform reboosts. The pipelines were then purged to avoid any complications during Albert Einstein's undocking from the ISS.

=== End of mission and deorbit ===
Albert Einstein undocked safely from the ISS at 08:55 UTC (09:55 CET) on 28 October 2013; it then conducted a series of orbital adjustments to allow the ISS astronauts to clearly observe its re-entry. On 2 November, it re-entered Earth's atmosphere and burnt up, along with a payload of ISS waste, over the Pacific Ocean.

== ATV missions ==
| Designation | Name | Launch date | ISS docking date | Deorbit date | Sources |
|---|---|---|---|---|---|
| ATV-1 | Jules Verne | 9 March 2008 | 3 April 2008 | 29 September 2008 | |
| ATV-2 | Johannes Kepler | 16 February 2011 | 24 February 2011 | 21 July 2011 | |
| ATV-3 | Edoardo Amaldi | 23 March 2012 | 28 March 2012 | 3 October 2012 | |
| ATV-4 | Albert Einstein | 5 June 2013 | 15 June 2013 | 2 November 2013 | |
| ATV-5 | Georges Lemaître | 29 July 2014 | 12 August 2014 | 15 February 2015 | |
