= Videometer =

European designed automatic docking system

A videometer is a European designed automatic docking system that guides an Automated Transfer Vehicle (ATV) towards the docking port of the Russian Zvezda Service Module of the International Space Station (ISS). The ATV uses relative global positioning system (GPS) in order to close in on the ISS up to a distance of 249 m. Thereafter the ATV uses two videometers, together with additional data from telegoniometers, to automatically complete the docking maneuver. Both videometers are active during rendezvous with one acting as a back-up.

Retroreflectors located on the aft end of Zvezda module accurately reflect pulsed laser beams emitted by the videometer on the front of the ATV. The spot patterns of laser light returned from the passive reflectors are analysed by the image processors on the ATV to give its relative position and orientation to the ISS. The beam travel time to the videometer's 26 retroreflectors, contained in a 25mm cube, compute the distance between the two spacecraft and thus allowing it to identify, approach and mate to Zvezda's docking mechanism.
