= Automated Transfer Vehicle =

Uncrewed cargo spacecraft developed by the European Space Agency

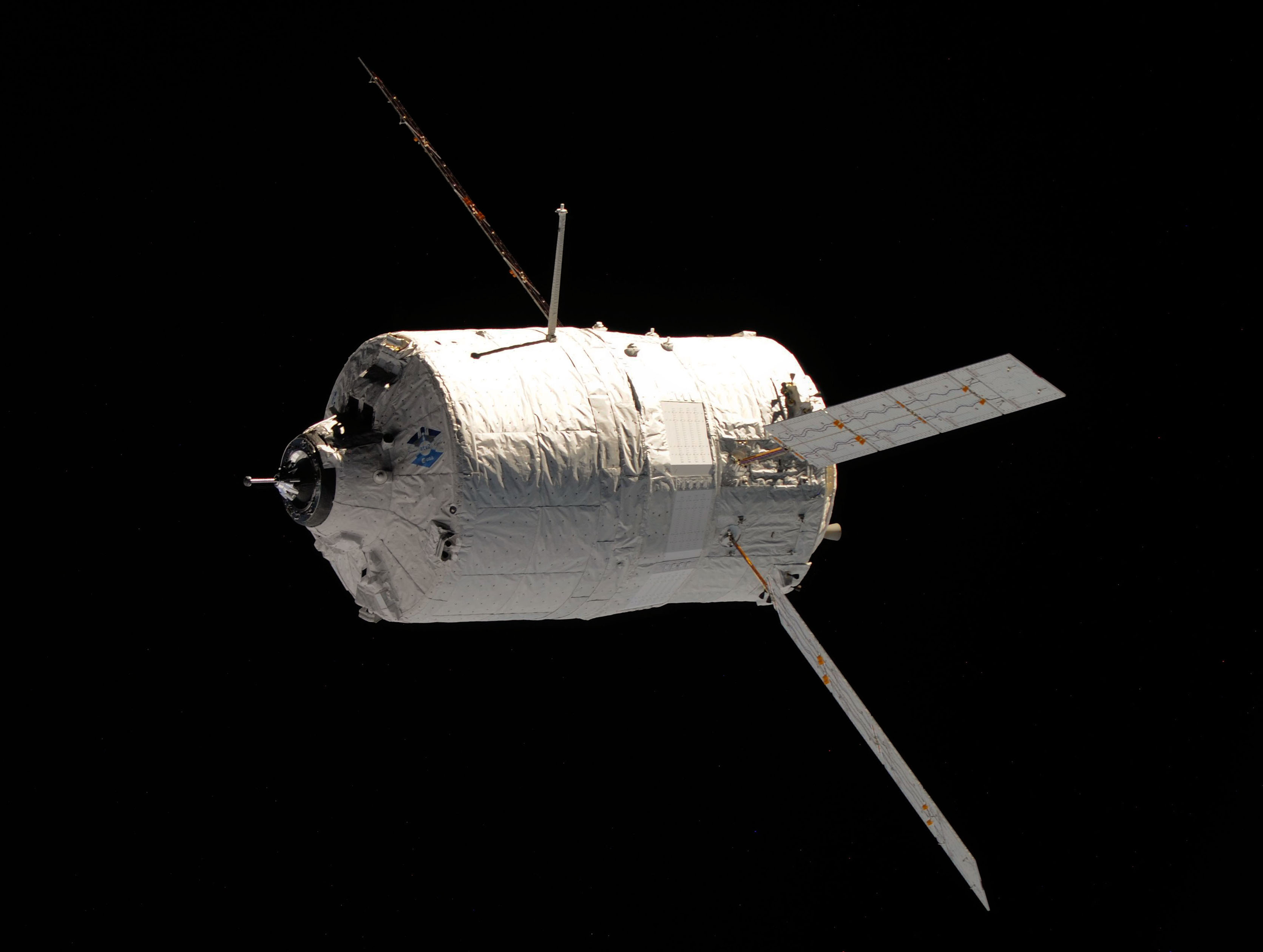
- Manufacturer: Airbus Defence and Space
- Country of origin: Europe
- Operator: European Space Agency
- Applications: ISS logistics

Specifications
- Launch mass: 20,750 kg (45,750 lb)
- Dry mass: 10,470 kg (23,080 lb) (including 5,150 kg (11,350 lb) Cargo Carrier module)
- Crew capacity: 0, but human-rated
- Volume: Pressurized: 48 m^{3} (1,700 cu ft)
- Power: 3.8 kW
- Batteries: 40 Ah
- Equipment: Propellant, water, gases and payloads

Dimensions
- Length: 10.3 m (34 ft)
- Diameter: 4.5 m (15 ft)
- Solar array span: 22.3 m (73 ft)

Capacity

Payload to ISS
- Mass: 7,667 kg (16,903 lb)

Production
- Status: Retired
- Launched: 5
- Maiden launch: 9 March 2008 (ATV-1)
- Last launch: 29 July 2014 (ATV-5)

Related spacecraft
- Derivatives: European Service Module

Engine details
- Propellant mass: 6,500 kg (14,300 lb) (Note: Missions required about 2,500 kg (5,500 lb) for ISS rendezvous/docking, orbital manoeuvres and deorbiting at the end of the mission. Up to 4,000 kg (8,800 lb) could be carried to reboost the ISS)
- Powered by: 4 × R-4D-11
- Maximum thrust: 4 x 490 N (110 lb_{f})
- Specific impulse: 270 s (2.6 km/s)
- Propellant: MON3 / MMH

The Automated Transfer Vehicle, originally Ariane Transfer Vehicle or ATV, was an expendable cargo spacecraft developed by the European Space Agency (ESA), used for space cargo transport in 2008–2015. The ATV design was launched to orbit five times, exclusively by the Ariane 5 heavy-lift launch vehicle. It effectively was a larger European counterpart to the Russian Progress cargo spacecraft for carrying upmass to a single destination—the International Space Station (ISS)—but with three times the capacity.

== History ==
The five ATVs were named after important European figures in science and engineering: Jules Verne, Johannes Kepler, Edoardo Amaldi, Albert Einstein, and Georges Lemaître. Following several delays to the program, the first of these was launched in March 2008. These ATVs performed supply missions to the ISS, transporting various payloads such as propellant, water, air, food, and scientific research equipment; ATVs also reboosted the station into a higher orbit while docked. The ATV was an uncrewed platform that operated with a high level of automation, such as its docking sequence; at no point was it used for transporting passengers.

Further use of the ATV was proposed in 2008. Various further developments, including crewed versions of the ATV as well as opportunities to reuse sections or elements of its technology, were studied by both the ESA and Airbus Defence and Space, the principal manufacturer of the vehicle. However, on 2 April 2012, the ESA announced that the ATV program would be terminated following the launch of the fifth ATV in 2014.

In 2012, ESA member states decided that the ATV design might be adapted to serve as the service module of the NASA Orion spacecraft. In January 2013, ESA and NASA announced that they would proceed with a combined Orion and ATV derived service module, later renamed European Service Module (ESM), which would serve as a major component for the Orion crewed spacecraft. NASA's Artemis I launched on November 16, 2022, carried the Orion spacecraft with the European Service Module (ESM) manufactured by Airbus Defence and Space for two planned low fly-by orbits to the Moon. ESA will provide the ESMs for the Artemis program up to Artemis VI with Artemis IV to provide the first humans to set foot on the Moon since 1972.

== Development ==
=== Origins ===
During the 1990s, as the International Space Station program was taking place, it was collectively recognised by the 15 participating nations that, upon completion, the International Space Station (ISS), a crewed space station in Low Earth orbit (LEO), would require regular resupply missions in order to meet the needs of the onboard crew as well as to deliver apparatus to support the various scientific tests that would be performed on board. In October 1995, it was agreed that, amongst the various contributions to the ISS program that Europe would assume responsibility for under the auspices of the European Space Agency (ESA), one of them would be the Automated Transfer Vehicle, or ATV; this logistics-orientated spacecraft would perform the identified resupply missions to the ISS.

On 9 December 1998, the ESA awarded a $470 million contract to proceed with development work on the ATV to French aerospace company Aérospatiale. While Aérospatiale served as the principal contractor for the ATV, it was joined by multiple major subcontractors, including Italian manufacturer Alenia Spazio, Franco-British firm Matra Marconi Space and German aerospace company DaimlerChrysler Aerospace (DASA); some components were also provided by Russian firm S. P. Korolev Rocket and Space Corporation Energia. Prior to 2000, DASA was to serve as the prime contractor for production, after which the role would be gradually transferred to Aérospatiale. At the point at which the contract had been awarded, it was envisioned that the first flight of the ATV would be conducted during September 2003.

The launch of the first ATV, which had been named Jules Verne, was subject to multiple delays, which were partially generated by problems encountered with the Ariane 5 heavy-lift launch vehicle, as well as a substantial software re-write. By May 2003, it was set to be launched sometime during late 2004. By mid 2004, it had been announced that launch of the first ATV, which was by then undergoing electrical testing following the completion of integration work, had been postponed due to technical issues, and was reportedly scheduled to be launched during late 2005, following the issuing of a renegotiated $1.1 billion contract between the ESA and the prime contractor. In March 2005, another launch delay was declared, due to the need for greater development of the failure-mode software along with launch-window timing changes, which put the planned ATV launch back from late 2005 to an undetermined date during 2006. In October 2005, it was clarified that the new launch date for the first ATV would be during 2007.

In September 2006, it was announced that the final stage of testing on the Ariane 5's customised ATV stage was within its final phase. In December 2006, it was announced that the first ATV had completed its vacuum test, marking the successful completion of the key tests and enabling a final launch date to be set. In April 2007, the ATV was subject to four-month long qualification process in response to operational concerns, including safety queries originating from the U.S., and to examine the vehicle's potential commercialisation.

=== Production ===
Following multiple restructuring and ownership changes, the prime contractor for the ATV became Airbus Defence and Space, which led a consortium of many sub-contractors. While development work had been started in Les Mureaux, France, much of the activity relocated to Bremen, Germany, as the project moved from its development to the production stage, in which work on the four initial units started. In order to facilitate the relationship between the contractor and the ESA, an integrated ESA team at the Les Mureaux site was established and maintained for the duration of the development.

Airbus Defence and Space builds the ATVs in its facility in Bremen. In 2004, contracts and accords were signed for four additional ATVs, which were envisioned to be launched at a rate of around one every two years, bringing the total order, including the first, Jules-Verne, to five vehicles. According to the German Aerospace Center (DLR), the development cost of the ATV was approximately €1.35 billion. Reportedly, each ATV spacecraft was costed at roughly US$300 million, which did not include launch costs. In March 2005, RSC Energia signed a €40 million contract with one of the main subcontractors of Airbus Defence and Space, the Italian company Alenia Spazio (now Thales Alenia Space), to supply the Russian Docking System, refuelling system, and Russian Equipment Control System. Within the Airbus Defence and Space led project, Thales Alenia Space is responsible for the pressurized cargo carrier section of the ATV and manufactures these at the firm's facility in Turin, Italy.

On 31 July 2007, the first ATV, Jules Verne, arrived at the ESA spaceport in Kourou, French Guiana, after a nearly two-week journey from Rotterdam harbour. On 9 March 2008, Jules Verne was launched on top of an Ariane 5 rocket from Kourou. On 3 April 2008, Jules Verne succeeded in automatically docking with the ISS, proving the capabilities of the ESA's first fully automated, expendable cargo resupply spacecraft. The arrival of the ATV came at a time at which there were public concerns over the logistical practicality of supplying the ISS.

In addition to its use by ESA and Russia, the ATV was at one point under consideration to perform services for NASA as part of the Commercial Orbital Transportation Services program to replace the retiring Space Shuttle in its orbital cargo carrying capacity. Under the proposal, which had been issued by a joint venture between EADS and Boeing, the ATV would be launched from Cape Canaveral, Florida, using a Delta IV rocket. One speculated use for NASA's ATV was to achieve the de-orbiting of the ISS once the space station had reached the end of its service life, being the only vehicle capable of doing so at that time after the Shuttle's retirement. Ultimately, the proposal was not awarded with a corresponding contract.

== Design ==
The Automated Transfer Vehicle (ATV) was a 1990s-design expendable cargo spacecraft. Each vehicle consisted of two distinct sections, the systems bus and the integrated cargo carrier. The system bus contained the ATV's propulsion system, avionics bays, and solar arrays; it was principally used following the vehicle's detachment from the Ariane 5 launcher to automatically traverse the remaining distance and dock with the ISS, the system bus would be inaccessible to the astronauts on board. The integrated cargo carrier consisted of a pressurised module, external bays for fluid and gas cargoes, further avionics and rendezvous sensors, and the docking mechanism. The primary structure of the ATV (of Al-2219) is protected by a meteorite and debris protection system. The first ATV was built in the 2000s and the first one to fly in space was in 2008.

The docking system of the ATV consists of a pair of videometers and a pair of telegoniometers manufactured by Sodern, a subsidiary of Airbus. Data processing for the rendezvous docking maneuver and emergency abort systems were designed and manufactured by CRISA. Additional monitoring data and redundancy was provided by the Kurs automatic docking system, which was also used by Soyuz and Progress spacecraft. Visual imagery is provided by a camera on the Zvezda ISS module.

In terms of its role, the ATV was designed to complement the smaller Russian Progress spacecraft, possessing three times its useful payload capacity. Similar to the Progress, it would carry both bulk liquids and relatively fragile freight, which would be stored within a cargo hold maintained at a pressurized shirt-sleeve environment in order that astronauts would be able to access payloads without the need to put on spacesuits.

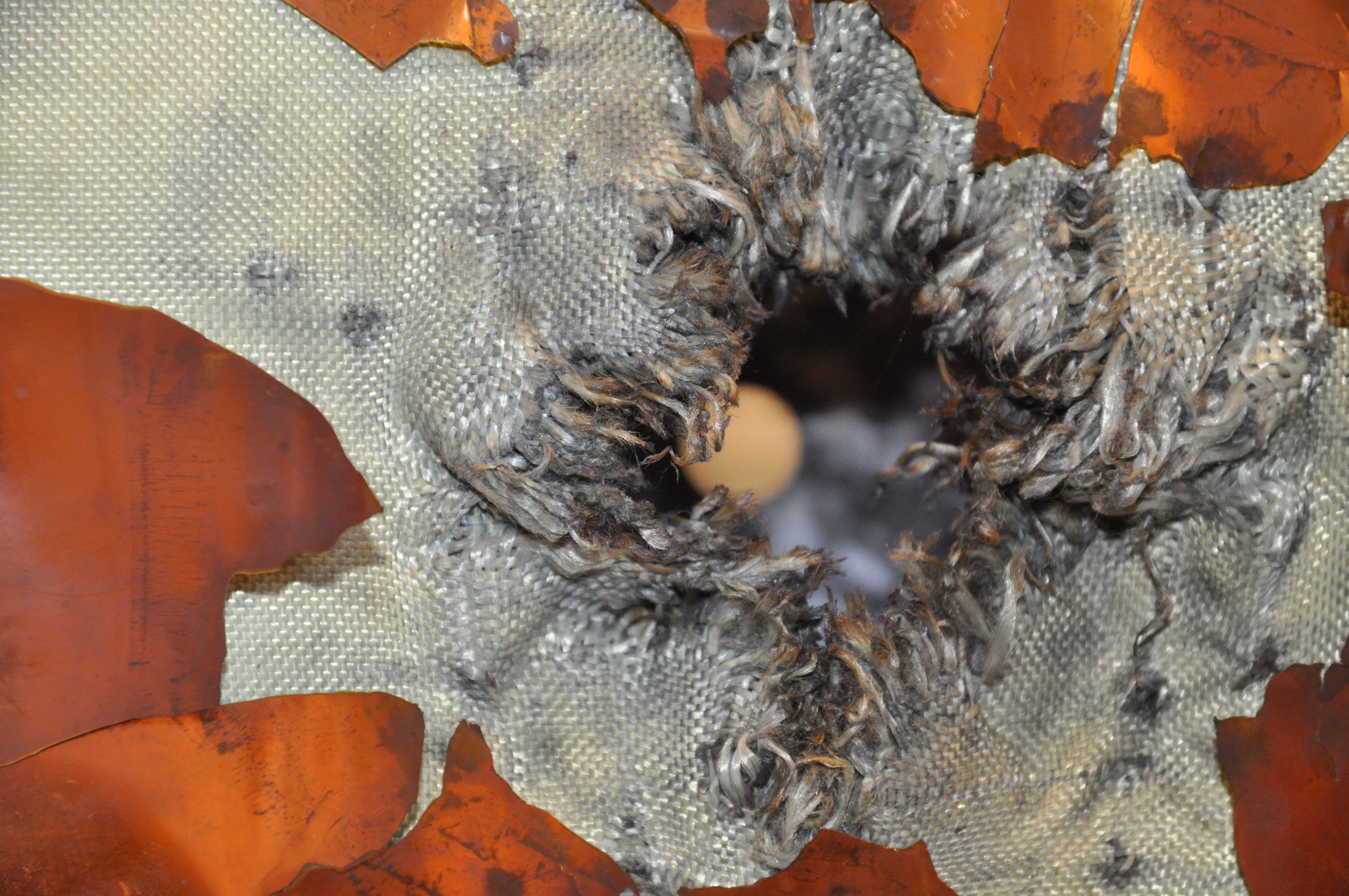
An exit hole through Kevlar–Nextel fabric after hypervelocity testing of the multilayer shielding for ESA's ATV space freighter, simulating an impact by space debris.

The pressurized cargo section of the ATV was based on the Italian-built Multi-Purpose Logistics Module (MPLM), which was a Shuttle-carried "space barge/container" that had been previously used for transporting equipment to and from the Station. Unlike the MPLM which had to be berthed to the ISS, the ATV used the same docking mechanism as employed upon the Progress. The ATV, like the Progress, also serves as a container for the station's waste. Each ATV weighs 20.7 tonnes at launch and has a cargo capacity of 8 tonnes:

- 1,500 kilograms (3,300 lb) to 5,500 kilograms (12,100 lb) of dry cargo (re-supply goods, scientific payload, etc.),
- Up to 840 kilograms (1,850 lb) of water,
- Up to 100 kilograms (220 lb) of gas (nitrogen, oxygen, air), with up to two gases per flight,
- Up to 4,700 kilograms (10,400 lb) of propellant for the re-boost maneuver and refueling the station. The ATV propellant used for re-boost (monomethylhydrazine fuel and N_{2}O_{4} oxidizer) is of a different type from the payload refueling propellant (UDMH fuel and N_{2}O_{4} oxidizer).

The system bus section of the ATV had solar panels (3,800 W), 40 Ah of batteries, propellant tanks, four R-4D (490 N) thrusters, and 28 attitude control and braking thrusters (220 N).

== Use and operation ==
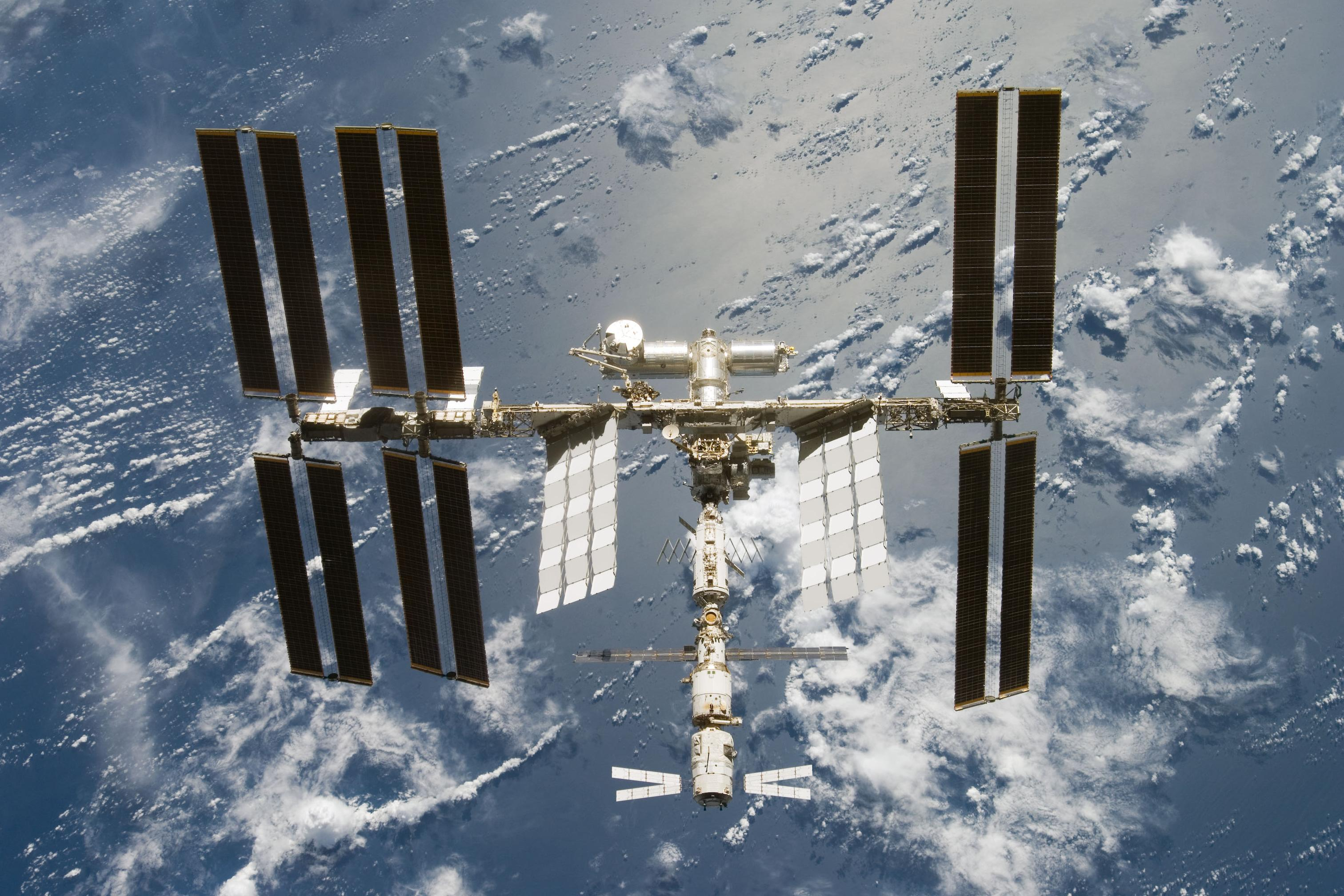
Jules Verne seen at the bottom of the ISS making the relative size clearly visible

ATVs were intended to be routinely launched every 17 months to conduct resupply missions to the International Space Station. The vehicle was launched into an orbital plane compatible with the ISS via the Ariane 5 expendable launch system; shortly after detaching from the launcher, the ATV would deploy its solar panels. Over an average mission time of 100 hours, it would perform phasing manoeuvers from its initial orbital high point under direct control from the ground-based European Space Operations Centre at Darmstadt, Germany, using NASA's Tracking and Data Relay Satellite System. A second series of manoeuvres would bring the ATV to the precise altitude of the ISS before commencing integrated operations for the final approach with the Space Station, during which mission authority transferred to NASA's Christopher C. Kraft Jr. Mission Control Center in Houston, Texas.

The ATV would employ a combination of GPS and astronavigation techniques to automatically rendezvous with the Space Station. Telemetry contact was established between the ISS and ATV during its preparations for the final approach. Once at a distance of 249 m, the onboard computers of the ATV employed both videometer and telegoniometer data to perform the final approach and docking manoeuvres; the docking itself to the Zvezda module, was fully automated. In the event of any last-minute technical issues or problems, a pre-programmed sequence of anti-collision manoeuvres, fully independent of the main navigation system, can be activated by the flight engineers aboard the station. Upon contact with the module, the automatic capture sequence would be activated.

Once the ATV had successfully docked, the station crew would be able to enter the vehicle's cargo section and directly access the payload on board. The ATV's liquid tanks would be connected to the station's plumbing by the crew to discharge their contents in a controlled manner, while the station crew would manually release air components directly into the ISS's atmosphere. For up to six months, the ATV, which would remain mainly in dormant mode, could remain attached to the ISS with the hatch remaining open throughout. The crew would then steadily fill the cargo section with the station's waste material for disposal. At intervals of 10 to 45 days, the ATV would be reactivated and its thrusters would typically be used to boost the station's altitude.

Once its mission was accomplished, the ATV, which would often be filled with up to 6.5 tonnes of waste, would separate from the ISS. Its thrusters would deliberately move the spacecraft out of orbit (de-orbit) and place it on a steep flight path to perform a controlled destructive re-entry high above the Pacific Ocean.

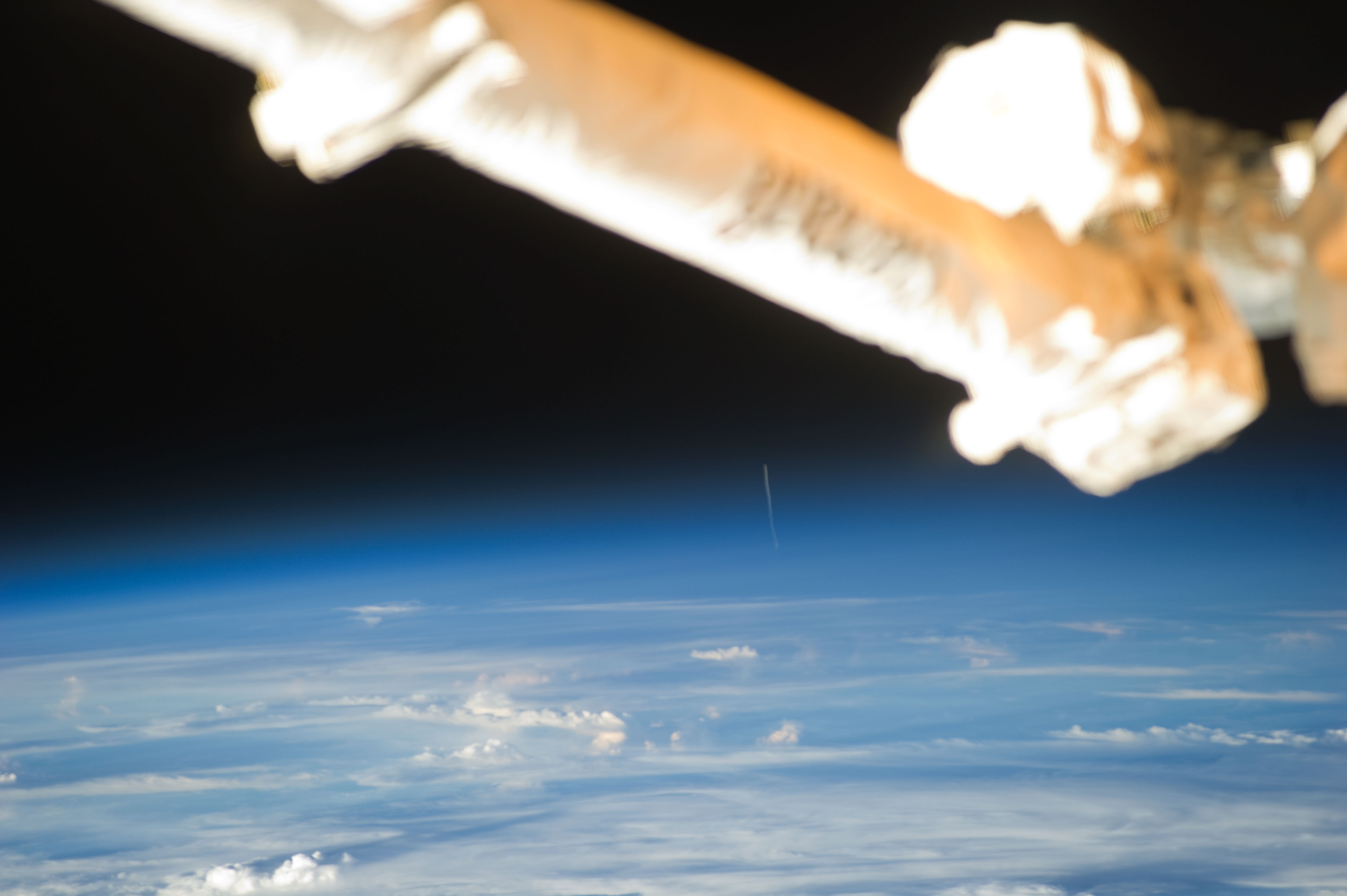
Johannes Kepler Automated Transfer Vehicle's launch as seen from the ISS

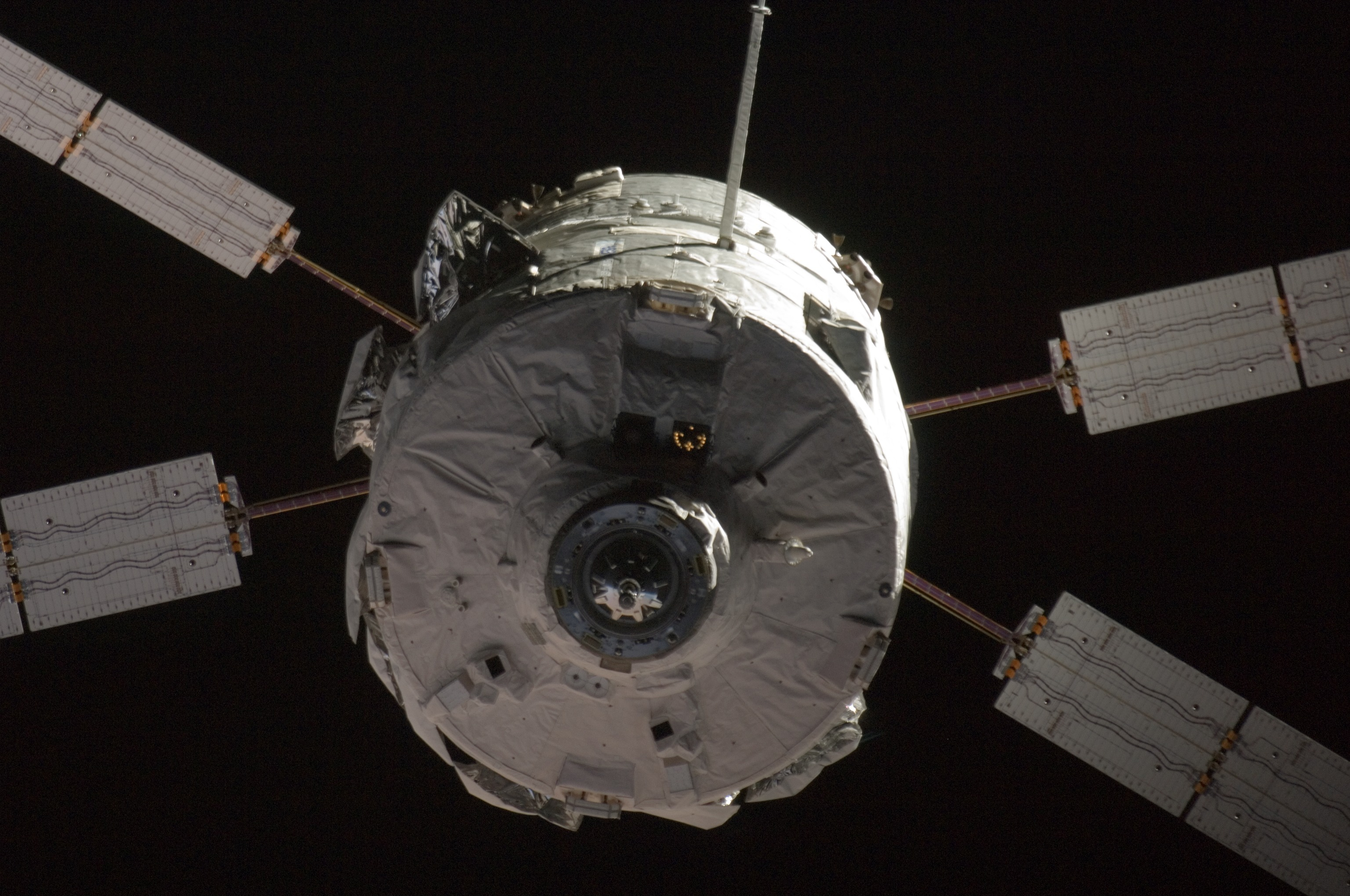
Jules Verne Automated Transfer Vehicle approaches the International Space Station

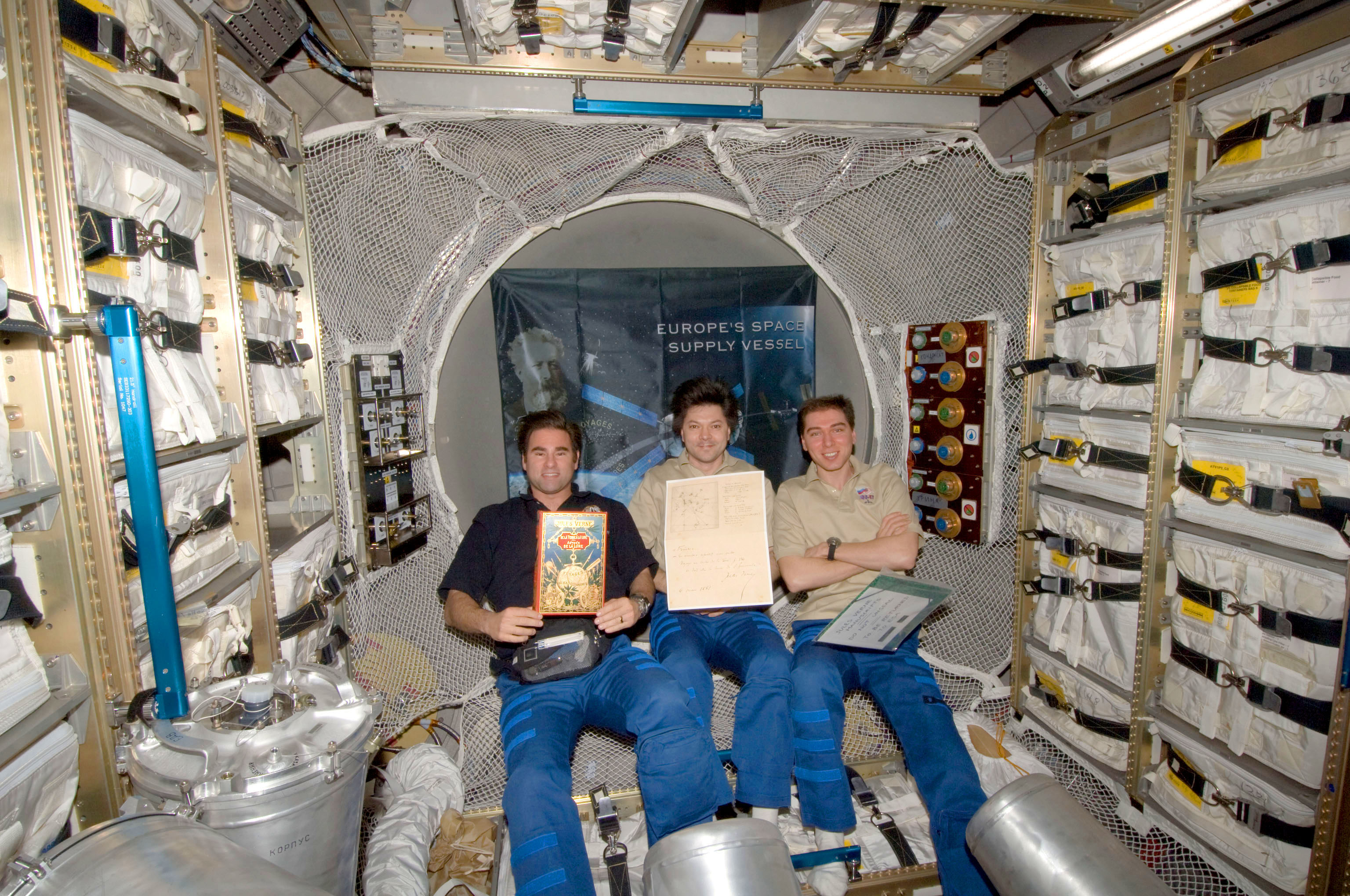
ATV interior with Expedition 17 crewmembers

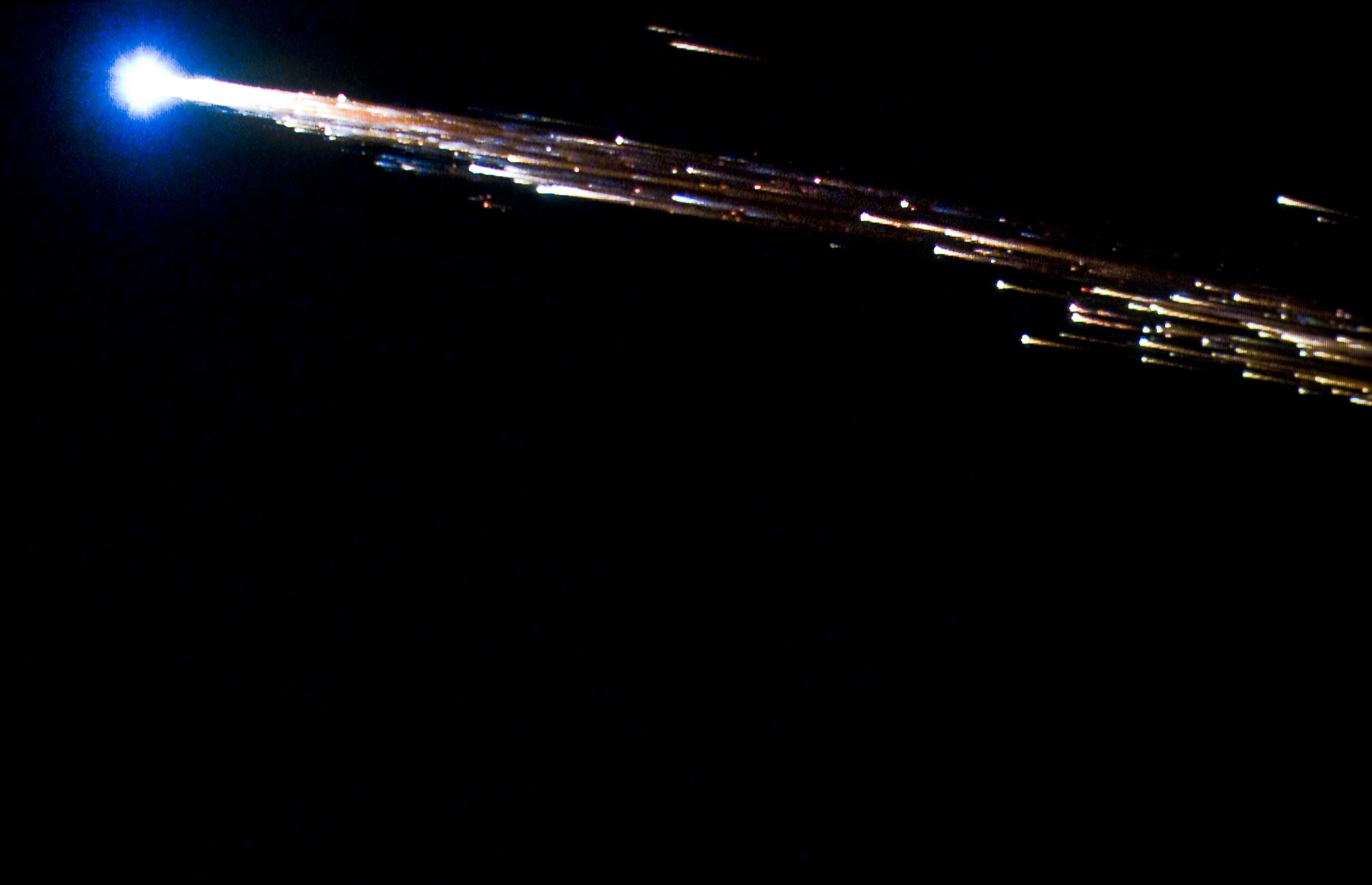
Jules Verne as it re-enters Earth's atmosphere in a controlled burn-up after undocking from ISS

== Missions ==
| Designation | Name | Launch date | ISS docking date | Deorbit date | Sources |
|---|---|---|---|---|---|
| ATV-1 | Jules Verne | 9 March 2008 | 3 April 2008 | 29 September 2008 | |
| ATV-2 | Johannes Kepler | 16 February 2011 | 24 February 2011 | 21 July 2011 | |
| ATV-3 | Edoardo Amaldi | 23 March 2012 | 28 March 2012 | 3 October 2012 | |
| ATV-4 | Albert Einstein | 5 June 2013 | 15 June 2013 | 2 November 2013 | |
| ATV-5 | Georges Lemaître | 29 July 2014 | 12 August 2014 | 15 February 2015 | |

On 2 April 2012, the ESA announced that the ATV program that had paid their share of the ISS running costs until 2017 would end after the fifth ATV had been launched in 2014, at that point they had the required components to assemble the next two but beyond that avionics components utilised in the design were no longer being manufactured. A similar deal to provide their share of the ISS operating costs through hardware contribution to the Orion programme was mooted.

=== Jules Verne ===
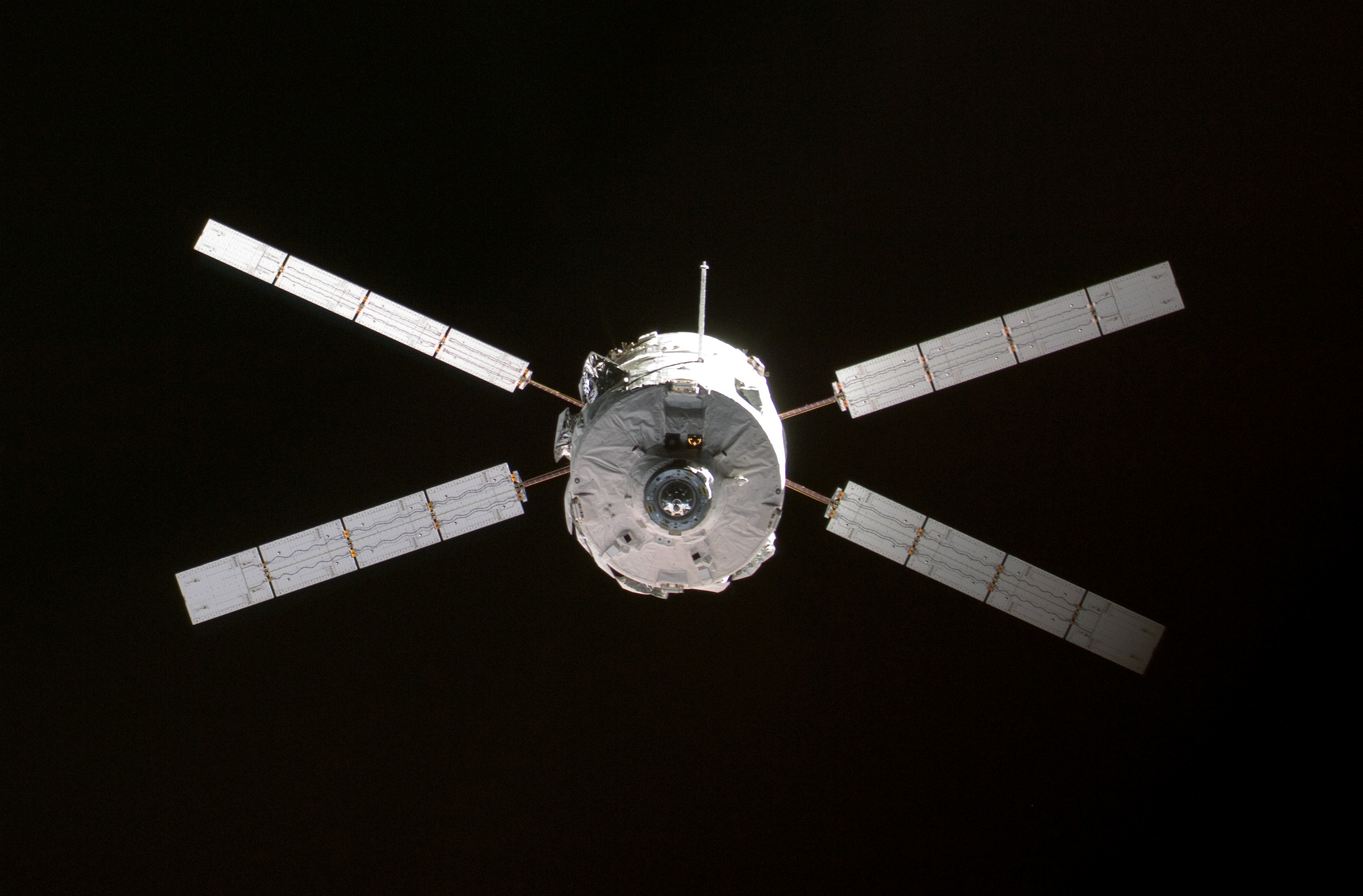
Jules Verne ATV at ISS, 2008

The first flight of the ATV was delayed on multiple occasions prior to its launch on 9 March 2008. It was named Jules Verne, in memory of the first science fiction writer of modern times. The Jules Verne carried two of the author's original handwritten manuscripts, to be received by the ISS crew as symbolic tokens of the success of the maiden flight.

The craft was launched into a 300-kilometre (190 mi) orbit atop an Ariane 5 rocket from the equatorial ELA-3 launch site at the Guiana Space Centre. The ATV separated from the rocket, and following weeks of tests and orbit adjustments, successfully docked in the International Space Station at 14:45 UTC on 3 April 2008.

In the early morning hours of 29 September 2008, the Jules Verne burnt up on entering the atmosphere above an uninhabited section of the Pacific Ocean, southwest of Tahiti.

=== Johannes Kepler ===
Launched on 17 February 2011, Johannes Kepler was at the time the heaviest payload ever launched by the European Space Agency and carried 7000 kg of cargo to the ISS. The first launch attempt on 15 February 2011 had been halted during the final countdown at four minutes from lift off due to an erroneous signal from one of the rocket's fuel tanks.

On 29 April 2011, the engines of the ATV were used to rotate the ISS in order for a Russian Progress supply craft to dock with the station.

Due to the delayed launch of STS-134 the mission of Johannes Kepler was extended, and it undocked from the ISS on 20 June 2011. It deorbited a day later on 21 June 2011.

=== Edoardo Amaldi ===
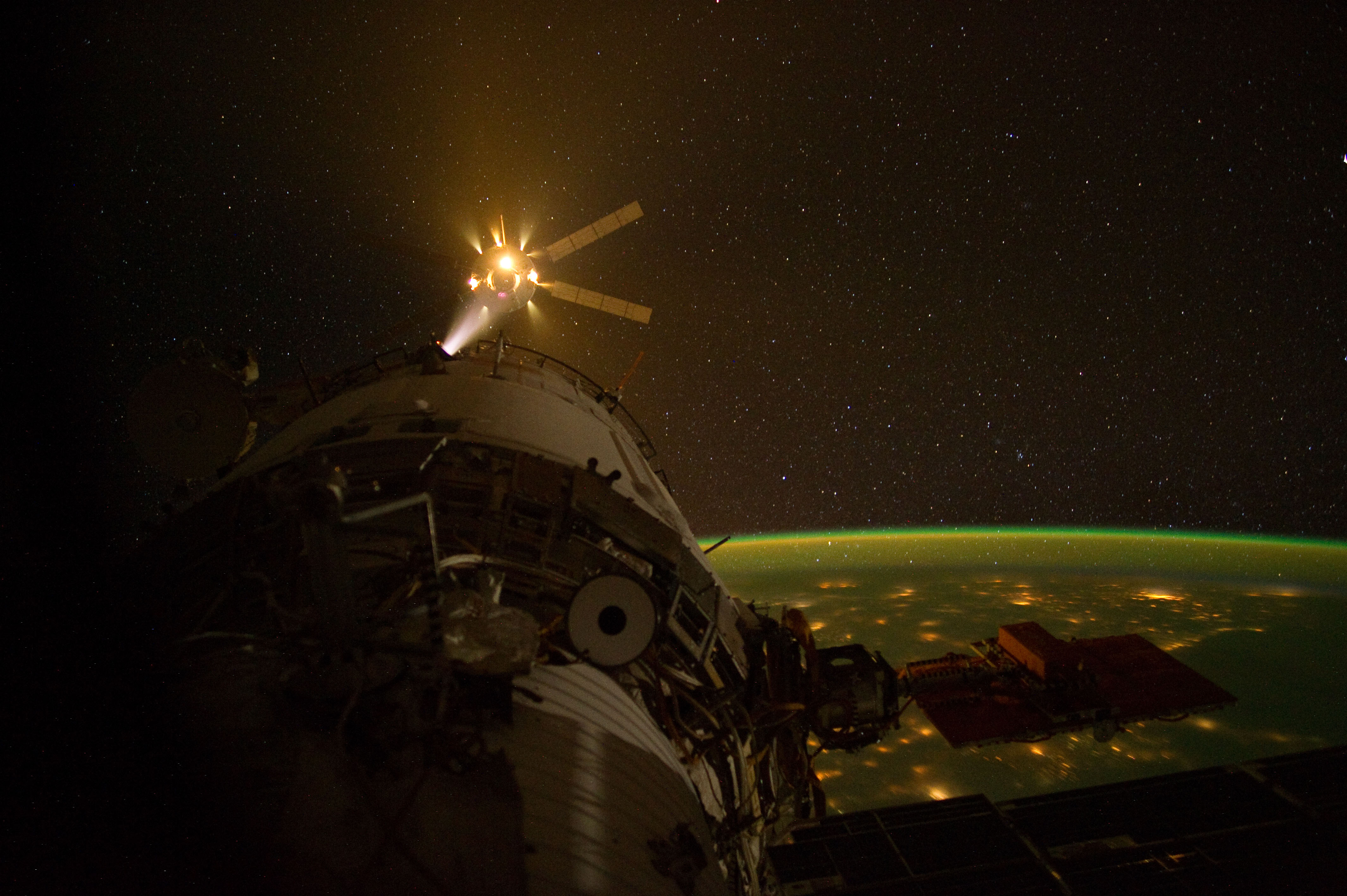
ATV-3 Edoardo Amaldi approaches ISS on the dark side of the Earth with thrusters firing, 2012

The third ATV vehicle arrived in French Guiana in late August 2011 and was launched on 23 March 2012. It docked with the International Space Station at 2231 GMT on 28 March 2012.

=== Albert Einstein ===
Albert Einstein ATV was the heaviest spacecraft launched by Ariane at the time and lifted off at 21:52:11 GMT on 5 June 2013. It docked with the ISS on 15 June 2013 at 14:07 GMT.

=== Georges Lemaître ===
Named after the Belgian astronomer Georges Lemaître. The spacecraft launched during the night of 29 July (23:44 GMT, 20:44 local time, 30 July 01:44 CEST), 2014, on a mission to supply the International Space Station (ISS) with propellant, water, air, and dry cargo, and an artwork by artist Katie Paterson. It docked with the ISS on 12 August at 13:30 GMT. Georges Lemaître had a total mass of almost 20.3 tonnes (20.0 long tons; 22.4 short tons), a mass that exceeded that of all previously launched ATVs. This also made it the heaviest spacecraft ever launched by an Ariane rocket.

== ATV Control Centre ==
ATV missions were monitored and controlled from the ATV Control Centre (ATV-CC), located at the Toulouse Space Centre (CST) in Toulouse, France. The ATV-CC was responsible for the planning and the issuing of commands for the orbital maneuvers and mission tasks of each ATV, from the moment of separation from its launch vehicle, until it burns up in the Earth's atmosphere. The ATV-CC has a direct communication line with the Columbus Control Center (Col-CC) in Oberpfaffenhofen, Germany. Col-CC provides ATV-CC with access to both the NASA's Tracking and Data Relay Satellite System and the European Artemis communication networks in order to communicate with both the ATV and the ISS. The ATV-CC coordinated its actions with NASA's Christopher C. Kraft Jr. Mission Control Center (MCC-H) in Houston and the Russian FKA Mission Control Center (TsUP or MCC-M) in Moscow, as well as the ATV launch site at the Guiana Space Centre in Kourou, French Guiana.

== Basis for European Service Module ==
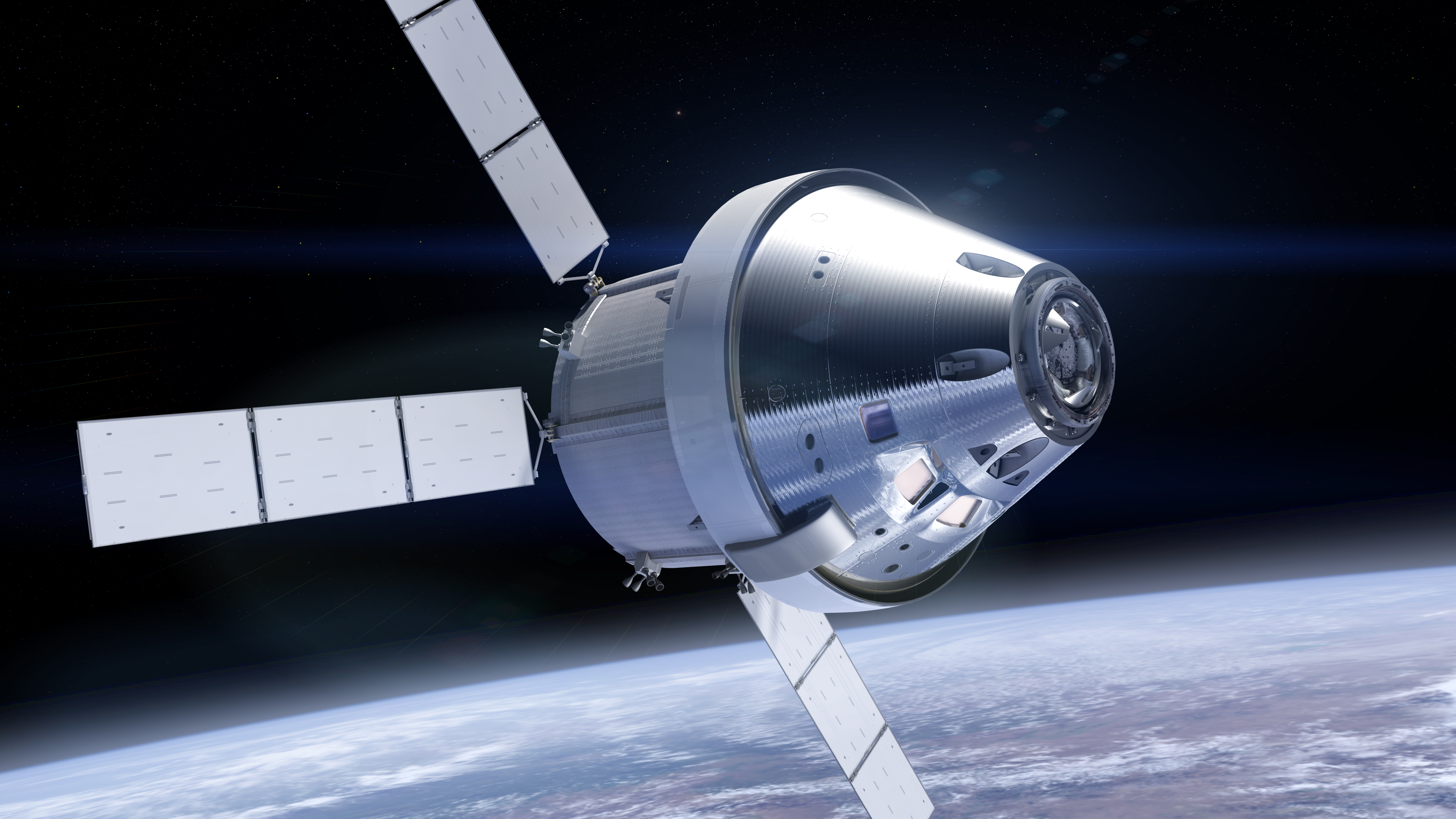
Orion spacecraft including the ATV derived service module

In May 2011 the ESA director general announced a possible collaboration with NASA to work on a successor to the ATV. Later that year, a proposal to utilise an ATV derived service module for NASA's Orion capsule was revealed. This service module would be provided as barter for the ESA's 8% share of the operating expense of the ISS, which had been fulfilled up to 2017 by the five ATVs. Developing a service module for Orion would cover the ESA's share of ISS operation up to 2020.

"ESA's contribution is going to be critical to the success of Orion's 2017 mission"

— NASA Orion Program manager

In June 2012, the ESA awarded two separate studies to Airbus, each worth €6.5 million, to evaluate options for using technology and experience gained from ATV and Columbus related work to cover the ESA's share of ISS operation past 2017. One study looked into developing a service module for Orion, while the other examined development of a multipurpose vehicle that could resupply space stations, remove debris, and service satellites in orbit. The studies were to be completed before the end of 2012.

At the meeting of the ESA Ministerial Council in November 2012, the ESA committed to developing the service module, and in mid-December signed an agreement with NASA to provide an ATV derived Orion service module for the maiden launch of Orion on the Space Launch System. The module is referred as European Service Module (ESM).

The ESA awarded Airbus Defence and Space a €390 million ($488 million) contract in November 2014 to develop and build the ESM.

== Evolution proposals ==
In addition to its principal role as a one-way uncrewed cargo transfer vehicle, from the onset of work on the project, the ESA had viewed the ATV as having the potential for being the starting point for a whole family of automated space vehicles. Amongst the conceived missions for ATV-derived vehicles have been orbital automated construction programmes and independent bases for experiments, as well as a potential upgraded version of the ATV that would survive reentry intact, enabling its use as a two-way cargo transfer vehicle. The potential commercialisation of the ATV was also the subject of a formal study conducted by the ESA, during which the prospects of using the spacecraft as a dedicated tug for satellites, as well as the use of alternative launch systems, were examined.

Following the decision by NASA to retire the Space Shuttle in 2011, the ESA decided to launch a further series of studies to determine the potential for evolutions and adaptations of the ATV. As a result of these studies, the cargo return version (CARV) was identified as a particularly promising candidate for further development. The goal of this variant is to provide ESA with the capability to transport scientific data and cargo from the ISS to Earth. Beyond this, CARV could be enhanced to become a crew vehicle which would be launched by an adapted Ariane 5.

Mini Space Station
The MSS concept is an ATV evolution proposal for the construction of multiple ATVs with two docking ports, one at each end. The current version of the ATV is already prepared for a docking port at the back, with the main propulsion system arranged in a cylindrical fashion leaving room for a tunnel through the middle. This concept would allow Soyuz, Progress and other ATVs to dock to the back of the ATV, allowing a steady flow of Russian vehicles using the available docking ports whilst an ATV is docked for an average of around 6 months at a time.

Payload Retrieval System
The PARES would have included a small ballistic capsule similar to VBK-Raduga embedded into the ATV docking interface, which would have brought back a few tens of kilograms of payload. PARES could have featured a deployable heat shield system. The European Space Agency was also proposing the system for use with the Progress spacecraft and the H-II Transfer Vehicle (HTV).

Cargo Ascent and Return Vehicle
The CARV would deliver a redesigned capsule, capable of bringing back payload from orbit. It could be installed in place of the ATV pressurized cargo hold. In addition, it could be adapted to use a berth rather than a docking port at the US side of the station. Given the larger berthing ports there, it would be possible to transfer complete International Standard Payload Racks (ISPRs) from the ATV to the station, which is only possible with the H-II Transfer Vehicle.

Crew Transport Vehicle
This is another option under consideration. Similar to the CARV variant, this would replace the current Integrated Cargo Carrier with a pressurized re-entry capsule. A significant difference with the cargo-only variant would be the presence of a Crew Escape System, consisting of a number of booster rockets able to pull the crew capsule away from the launcher (Ariane 5) and/or Service Module in the event of an emergency. The CTV variant of the ATV could be able to seat 4 or 5 crew members.

Possibilities for launching of the ATV on other launchers than the Ariane 5 have also been investigated, in particular in the frame of Commercial Orbital Transportation Services. ESA and its member states will consider approval for further ATV development in the coming years.

An MSS could be used as a small orbital lab

PARES capsules would be able to hold a few kg of cargo

CARV would be used to transport a large amount of cargo to Earth

=== Proposed crewed version ===
A 3D rendering of the proposed ATV derived crewed transportation system.

Both the ESA and the manufacturing team have considered various programmes under which the ATV, or portions of the technologies composing it, would have been developed into a crewed configuration.

On 14 May 2008, aerospace company EADS Astrium and the German Aerospace Center (DLR), announced that they were actively pursuing a development project with the aim of adapting the ATV into a crew transportation system. In the envisioned configuration, the craft would be able to launch a 3-person crew beyond LEO via use of a modified version of the Ariane 5 rocket and would be more spacious than the Russian Soyuz. A mock-up of the proposed craft was publicly displayed at the 2008 International Aerospace Exhibition in Berlin. If the project were to have been given ESA approval, development would have proceeded in two stages:

- The first stage would have involved the development of an Advanced Reentry Vehicle (ARV) capable of transporting up to 1,500 kg of cargo from space to earth safely (see CARV above) by 2015. This capability would be available to ESA even if further development were to be halted. It would prove useful in the ISS program as well as the proposed Mars Sample Return Mission with NASA. ARV development would make use of work done on the Atmospheric Reentry Demonstrator, Crew Return Vehicle and related projects. The budget for this stage of the ATV overhaul would reportedly be €300 million.
- The second stage would adapt the then existing capsule to be able to transport people safely as well as upgrade the propulsion and other systems in the service module and would last 4 to 5 years at a cost of "a couple of billion [euro]" according to a senior Astrium representative.

In November 2008, ESA ministers budgeted for a feasibility study into developing a re-entry capsule for the ATV, a requirement for developing either a cargo return capacity or a crew version of the ATV. On 7 July 2009, the ESA signed a €21 million study contract with EADS Astrium. The ARV effort was ultimately discontinued after completing the B1 stage due to fiscal constraints resulting from the 2008 financial crisis.

== Exoliner ==
During the 2010s, Lockheed Martin put together a proposal for Commercial Resupply Services 2 that included a new 4.4-meter (14 ft) diameter cargo transport module called Exoliner, which was based on the ATV and was to be jointly developed with Thales Alenia Space.

== See also ==
- Cargo spacecraft – Spacecraft without people on board
  - Cygnus spacecraft – Uncrewed cargo spacecraft developed by Orbital Sciences
  - SpaceX Dragon 2 – 2020s class of partially reusable spacecraft
  - Dream Chaser – US reusable automated cargo lifting-body spaceplane
  - H-II Transfer Vehicle – Uncrewed cargo spacecraft developed by JAXA
  - Progress spacecraft – Russian expendable freighter spacecraft
- Commercial Resupply Services – NASA program for delivery of cargo to the ISS
- Comparison of space station cargo vehicles
- European contribution to the International Space Station – Overview of the contribution to the International Space Station from Europe
