= Georges Lemaître ATV =

2014 European resupply spaceflight to the ISS

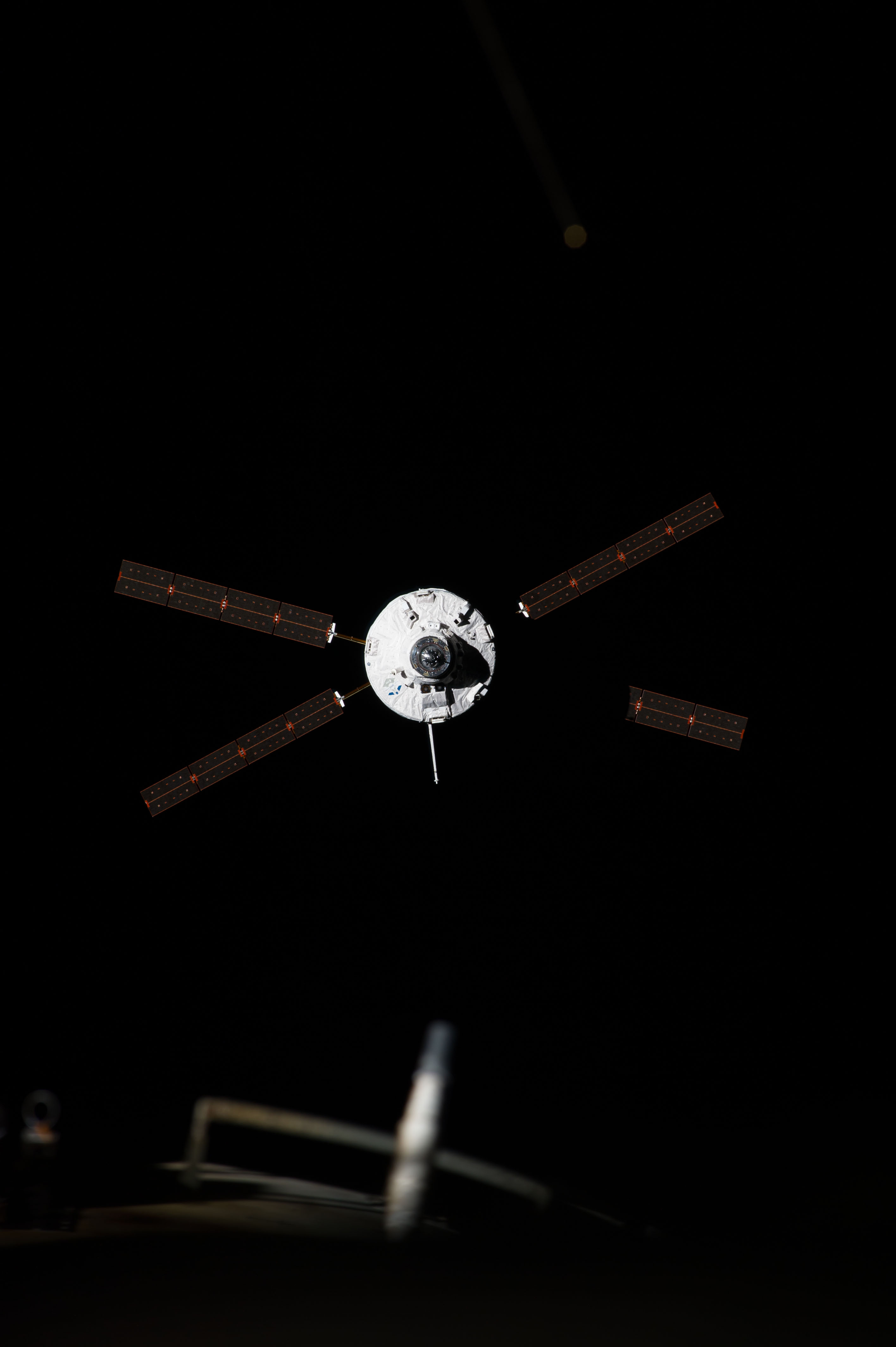
- Georges Lemaître ATV on approach for docking to the ISS on 12 August 2014
- Mission type: ISS resupply
- Operator: European Space Agency
- COSPAR ID: 2014-044A
- SATCAT no.: 40103
- Mission duration: 6 months

Spacecraft properties
- Spacecraft type: ATV
- Manufacturer: Airbus Defence and Space; Thales Alenia Space
- Launch mass: 20,293 kilograms (44,738 lb)

Start of mission
- Launch date: 29 July 2014, 23:47:38 UTC
- Rocket: Ariane 5ES
- Launch site: Kourou ELA-3
- Contractor: Arianespace

End of mission
- Disposal: Deorbited
- Decay date: 15 February 2015, 18:04 UTC

Orbital parameters
- Reference system: Geocentric
- Regime: Low Earth
- Perigee altitude: 412 kilometres (256 mi)
- Apogee altitude: 422 kilometres (262 mi)
- Inclination: 51.65 degrees
- Period: 92.77 minutes
- Epoch: 14 December 2014, 02:33:36 UTC

Docking with ISS
- Docking port: Zvezda Aft
- Docking date: 12 August 2014, 13:30 UTC
- Undocking date: 14 February 2015, 13:42 UTC
- Time docked: 186 days, 0 hour, 12 minutes

Cargo
- Mass: 6,555 kilograms (14,451 lb)
- Pressurised: 2,622 kilograms (5,781 lb)
- Fuel: 2,978 kilograms (6,565 lb)
- Gaseous: 100 kilograms (220 lb)
- Water: 855 kilograms (1,885 lb)

The Georges Lemaître ATV, or Automated Transfer Vehicle 5 (ATV-5), was a European uncrewed cargo spacecraft, named after the Belgian astronomer Georges Lemaître. The spacecraft was launched during the night of 29 July 2014 (23:44 GMT, 20:44 local time, 30 July 01:44 CEST), on a mission to supply the International Space Station (ISS) with propellant, water, air, and dry cargo. It was the fifth and final ATV to be built and launched. Georges Lemaître was constructed in Turin, Italy, and Bremen, Germany. Cargo loading was completed in Guiana Space Center on 23 July 2014.

Georges Lemaître was launched on an Ariane 5ES rocket from the Guiana Space Centre in Kourou, French Guiana. The launch was conducted by Arianespace on behalf of the European Space Agency.

Artist Katie Paterson sent artwork to the International Space Station aboard ATV-5.

== Mission payload ==
Georges Lemaître ferried 6.6 tonnes of experiments, spare parts, clothing, food, fuel, air, oxygen and water to the ISS. Included was a Haptics-1 joystick which is an advanced force feedback joystick to be used for physiological experiments on tactile feedback.

In addition to transporting cargo ATV-5 performed 2 experiments:

LIRIS (Laser InfraRed Imaging Sensors) was a new autonomous rendezvous sensor set that allowed future ships to dock with uncooperative targets, like debris or sample capsules - the ATV used a demonstration version of this advanced sensor system instead of the standard optical sensors bouncing light off the reflectors around ISS docking port.

Break-Up Camera recorded the ATV in infrared as it disintegrated during atmospheric reentry above the Pacific Ocean. After completion of recording, a reinforced SatCom capsule doubling as a prototype "black box" began transmitting the recorded data to one of the Iridium satellites through the gap in plasma behind the vehicle. One message was received, which included accelerometer, magnetometer and temperature readings. Transmission of the nearly 6000 images, which were apparently successfully recorded, would have involved further messages. It was unclear why but none of these were received.

Cargo	Mass
Dry Cargo	2,695 kilograms (5,941 lb)
Water	843 kilograms (1,858 lb)
Oxygen (2 tanks) & Air (1 tank)	100 kilograms (220 lb)
Propellant	4,356 kilograms (9,603 lb) (includes 2,118 kilograms (4,669 lb) ISS prop support)
Refuelling propellant	860 kilograms (1,896 lb)
Total cargo	8,854 kilograms (19,520 lb)
Total launch mass	20,235 kilograms (44,611 lb)

== ATV missions ==
Designation	Name	Launch date	ISS docking date	Deorbit date	Sources
ATV-1	Jules Verne	9 March 2008	3 April 2008	29 September 2008	
ATV-2	Johannes Kepler	16 February 2011	24 February 2011	21 July 2011	
ATV-3	Edoardo Amaldi	23 March 2012	28 March 2012	3 October 2012	
ATV-4	Albert Einstein	5 June 2013	15 June 2013	2 November 2013	
ATV-5	Georges Lemaître	29 July 2014	12 August 2014	15 February 2015	
