= Edoardo Amaldi ATV =

2012 European resupply spaceflight to the ISS

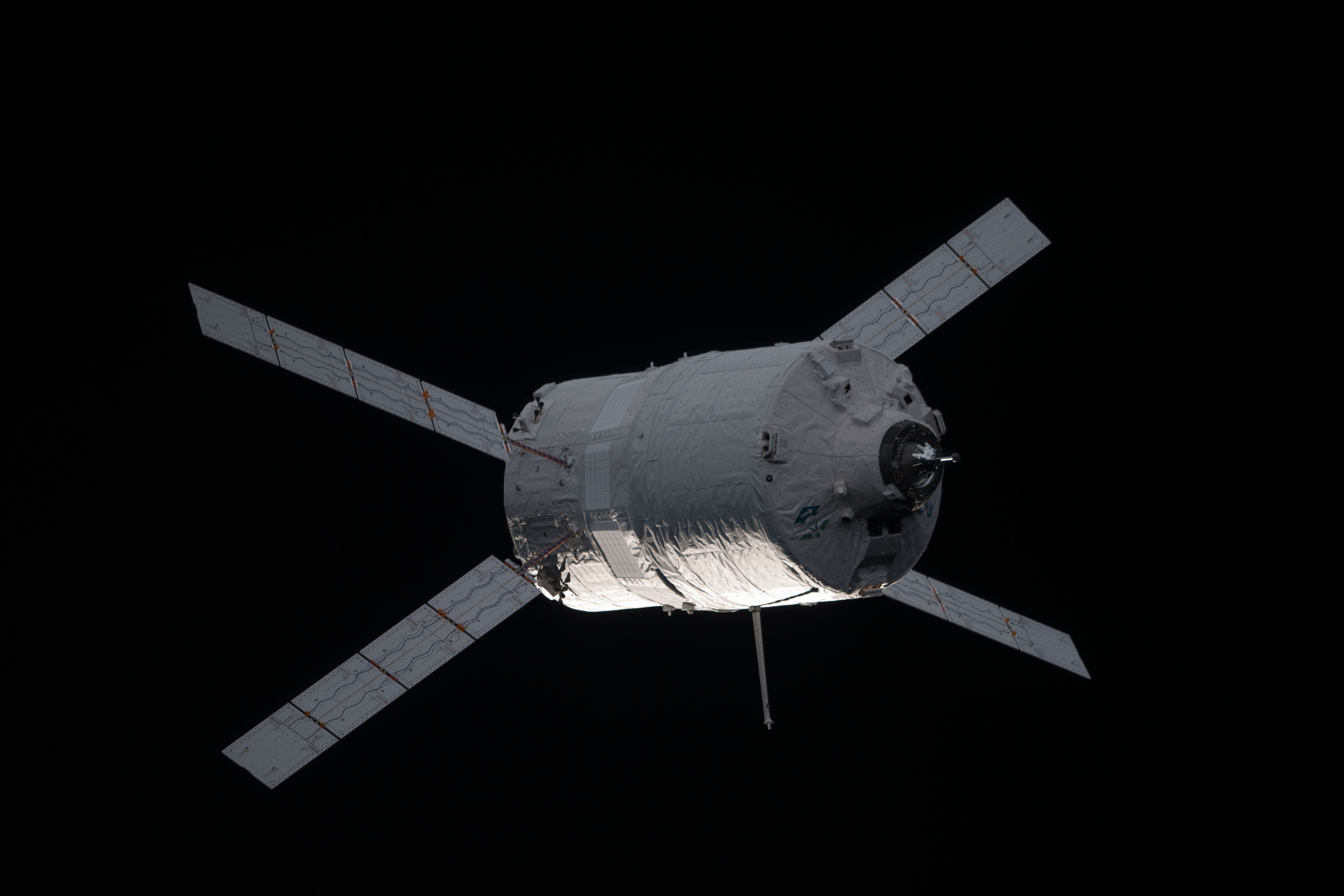
- Edoardo Amaldi during its approach to the ISS on 28 March 2012
- Mission type: ISS resupply
- Operator: European Space Agency
- COSPAR ID: 2012-010A
- SATCAT no.: 38096
- Mission duration: 6 months

Spacecraft properties
- Spacecraft type: ATV
- Manufacturer: EADS Astrium; Thales Alenia Space
- Launch mass: 20,050 kilograms (44,200 lb)

Start of mission
- Launch date: 23 March 2012, 04:34:12 UTC
- Rocket: Ariane 5ES
- Launch site: Kourou ELA-3
- Contractor: Arianespace

End of mission
- Disposal: Deorbited
- Decay date: 3 October 2012, 01:23 UTC

Orbital parameters
- Reference system: Geocentric
- Regime: Low Earth
- Perigee altitude: 410 kilometres (250 mi)
- Apogee altitude: 420 kilometres (260 mi)
- Inclination: 51.64 degrees
- Period: 92.73 minutes
- Epoch: 2 October 2012, 19:36:14 UTC

Docking with ISS
- Docking port: Zvezda Aft
- Docking date: 28 March 2012, 22:51 UTC
- Undocking date: 28 September 2012, 21:44 UTC

The Edoardo Amaldi ATV, or Automated Transfer Vehicle 003 (ATV-003), was a European uncrewed cargo spacecraft, named after the 20th-century Italian physicist Edoardo Amaldi. The spacecraft was launched by the European Space Agency (ESA) on 23 March 2012, on a mission to supply the International Space Station (ISS) with propellant, water, oxygen, and dry cargo.

Edoardo Amaldi was the third ATV to be built, following Jules Verne (2008) and Johannes Kepler (2011). At the time of its launch, it was the world's largest single operational spacecraft, with a total launch mass of over 20 tonnes (44,000 lb). The ATV completed its mission successfully, and was deorbited on 3 October 2012, burning up in the Earth's atmosphere as planned.

== Mission payload ==
Cargo	Mass
ISS reboost/attitude control propellant	3,150 kilograms (6,940 lb)
ISS refuel propellant	860 kilograms (1,900 lb)
Oxygen gas	100 kilograms (220 lb)
Water	285 kilograms (628 lb)
Dry cargo (food, clothes, equipment)	2,200 kilograms (4,900 lb)
Total	6,595 kilograms (14,539 lb)

Source: ESA

=== Amaldi letter ===
In addition to its primary cargo, the ATV carried a reproduction of a letter written by its namesake, Edoardo Amaldi, in 1958. This document, whose original is of significant historical value, reflects Amaldi's vision of a peaceful and non-military European space organisation – a blueprint for the real-life ESA.

== Mission summary ==
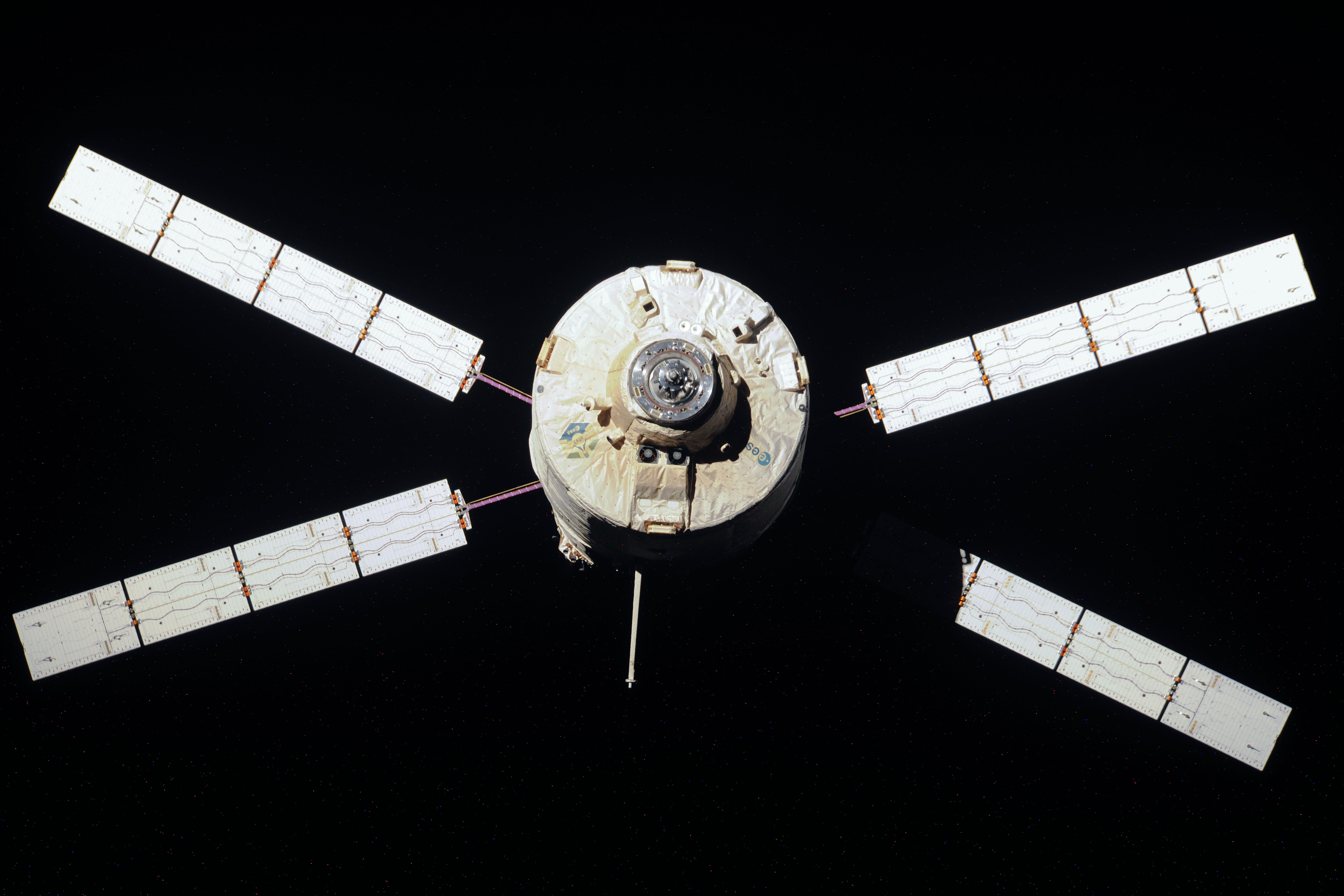
Edoardo Amaldi departs from the ISS on 28 September 2012.

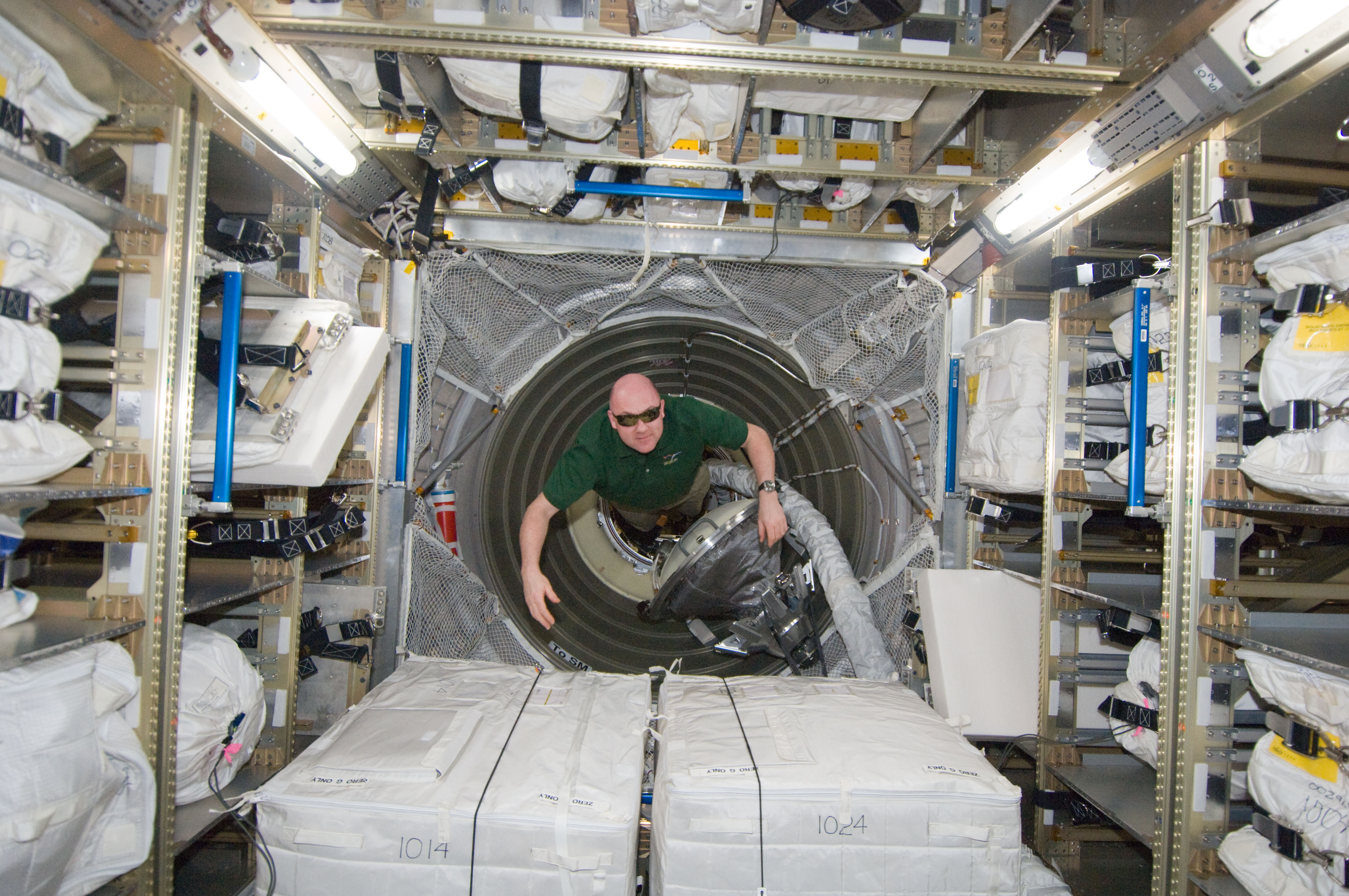
ESA astronaut André Kuipers floats into the ATV.

=== Launch ===
Edoardo Amaldi arrived at the Guiana Space Centre in Kourou, French Guiana, in August 2011 to undergo pre-launch preparations. The spacecraft was mounted on an Ariane 5ES rocket, and was launched on 23 March 2012 by Arianespace on behalf of the European Space Agency.

=== Docking ===
The ATV docked with the ISS on 28 March 2012, five days after its launch. In addition to resupplying the Expedition 30 astronauts, Edoardo Amaldi used its thrusters to boost the station's altitude.

=== Deorbit ===
The ATV was initially planned to undock from the ISS on 25 September 2012. However, a command program error during the undocking procedure delayed the release, and Edoardo Amaldi did not actually undock until 21:44 GMT on 28 September. The spacecraft finally deorbited and performed a destructive re-entry over the Pacific Ocean on 3 October 2012, taking with it a payload of station waste.

== ATV missions ==
Designation	Name	Launch date	ISS docking date	Deorbit date	Sources
ATV-1	Jules Verne	9 March 2008	3 April 2008	29 September 2008	
ATV-2	Johannes Kepler	16 February 2011	24 February 2011	21 July 2011	
ATV-3	Edoardo Amaldi	23 March 2012	28 March 2012	3 October 2012	
ATV-4	Albert Einstein	5 June 2013	15 June 2013	2 November 2013	
ATV-5	Georges Lemaître	29 July 2014	12 August 2014	15 February 2015	

== See also ==
- Commercial Orbital Transportation Services, a NASA program to develop uncrewed commercial resupply spacecraft
- Uncrewed spaceflights to the International Space Station

Similar cargo spacecraft

- H-II Transfer Vehicle
- Progress spacecraft
- SpaceX Dragon
