= Reboost =

A reboost is the process of boosting the altitude of an artificial satellite in Low Earth Orbit in order to delay its atmospheric re-entry due to orbital decay.

== See also ==
- Orbital station-keeping
- International Space Station § Orbit
- Specific orbital energy § Applying thrust
