= Telegoniometer =

Remote-controlled goniometer

A telegoniometer is a type of goniometer with remote control and readout. A goniometer is a device for varying the phase relationship(s) among two or more antennae in an array in order to steer its directionality without the need to physically move the antennae. It is commonly used for radio direction finding.

One application of the telegoniometer is in automated docking for uncrewed spacecraft, specifically for the long-range approach phase, before more precise but shorter-range optical systems take over.
