= Airbus Defence and Space =

Division of Airbus

- Type: Division
- Industry: Aerospace; Defence
- Predecessor: Airbus Military, Astrium, Cassidian
- Founded: January 2014; 12 years ago
- Headquarters: Taufkirchen, Germany
- Area served: Worldwide
- Key people: Michael Schoellhorn (CEO)
- Products: Military aircraft, launch vehicles, spacecraft
- Services: Cyber security, Military intelligence
- Revenue: ▲€13.335 billion (2025)
- Operating income: ▲€639 million (2025)
- Total assets: ▲€23.507 billion (2025)
- Number of employees: ▼36,244 (2025)
- Parent: Airbus
- Subsidiaries: CRISA, Spot Image, Tesat-Spacecom
- Website: airbus.com/defence; airbus.com/security; airbus.com/space
- Footnotes; Financials as of 31 December 2025. References

Airbus Defence and Space is the military and space systems division of Airbus. It was formed in 2014 during the restructuring of the European Aeronautic Defence and Space (EADS), the predecessor of Airbus. The subsidiary consists of the former Airbus Military, Astrium, and Cassidian divisions of EADS. Contributing 21% of the company's revenues in 2016, it is the second largest space company in the world.

Plans have been announced to merge the space systems businesses of Airbus, Telespazio, and Thales Alenia Space into a new joint venture owned by Airbus (35%), Leonardo (32.5%), and Thales (32.5%). The combined entity would have had an estimated annual turnover of €6.5 billion. If approved by regulators, the new company is expected to be operational in 2027.

== History ==
=== Formation of EADS and expansion (1997–2008) ===
As early as 1995, the German aerospace and defence company DaimlerChrysler Aerospace (DASA) and its British counterpart British Aerospace were said to be eager to create a transnational aerospace and defence company. The two companies envisaged including the French corporation Aérospatiale — another major European aerospace company — in the project, but only after its privatisation, as it was owned by the French state. However, the merger faltered, and British Aerospace abandoned the DASA merger in favour of purchasing its domestic rival, Marconi Electronic Systems, which was the electronics division of General Electric Company. The merger of British Aerospace and MES to form BAE Systems was announced on 19 January 1999 and completed on 30 November.

DASA and the Spanish aircraft company CASA agreed to merge on 11 June 1999. On 14 October 1999 DASA agreed to merge with Aérospatiale (which had itself merged with the French conglomerate Matra to become Aérospatiale-Matra earlier that year) to create the European Aeronautic Defence and Space Company (EADS). 10 July 2000 was "Day One" for the new company, which became the world's second-largest aerospace company after Boeing and the second-largest European arms manufacturer after BAE Systems. In January 2001 Airbus Industries was transformed from an inherently dysfunctional consortium structure to a formal joint stock company, with legal and tax procedures being finalised on 11 July.

On 16 June 2003, EADS acquired BAE's 25% share in Astrium, the satellite and space system manufacturer, to become the sole owner. EADS paid £84 million for the deal. However, due to the loss-making status of BAE, EADS invested an equal amount for "restructuring". It was subsequently renamed Astrium, and had the divisions Astrium Satellites, Astrium Space Transportation and Astrium Services.

On 1 July 2003, EADS Defence and Security Systems was founded with the merger of the activities of missile systems (LFK), defence electronics, military aircraft and telecommunications of the EADS Group. Tom Enders became the first CEO of the new division.

Airbus Defence and Space has its main office in Taufkirchen, Germany, and is led by chief executive officer Michael Schoellhorn. The company consists of three programme lines: Military Air Systems (MiAS), Connected Intelligence (CI) and Space Systems.

==== Airbus Military ====
The predecessor company was established in January 1999 as the Airbus Military Company SAS to manage the Airbus A400M project, taking over from the Euroflag consortium. In May 2003, the company was restructured as Airbus Military Sociedad Limitada (AMSL) prior to the execution of the production contract. The Military Transport Aircraft Division (MTAD) was a division of EADS that designs, manufactures and commercialises EADS-CASA light and medium transport aircraft, headquartered in Madrid, Spain. In 1999, Construcciones Aeronáuticas SA (CASA) in the EADS Group (European Aeronautic Defence and Space Company) was incorporated. In Spain, it is still referred to as EADS-CASA. The EADS-CASA division Military Transport Aircraft Division (MTA division) was also responsible for the development, production and sales of the leichten- and medium Transport and utility aircraft within the EADS Group. On 16 December 2008, EADS announced that the Military Transport Aircraft Division (MTA division) and Airbus Military SL (AMSL) as a new business unit in the Airbus SAS integrated. Airbus Military was formally created in April 2009 by the integration of the former Military Transport Aircraft Division (MTAD) and Airbus Military Sociedad Limitada (AMSL) into Airbus. The division manufactured tanker, transport, and mission aircraft, including Airbus A330 MRTT, Airbus A400M, CASA C-212 Aviocar, CASA/IPTN CN-235 and EADS CASA C-295. After the merger, it also acquired the production of Eurofighter Typhoon, which was earlier under Cassidian. Eurocopter, which was previously under Airbus Military, was reorganised as Airbus Helicopters.

==== Astrium ====
Astrium was formed in 2000 by the merger of Matra Marconi Space (itself formed from French and British companies) with the space division of DaimlerChrysler Aerospace AG and Computadores Redes e Ingeniería SA. Henceforth Astrium was a joint venture between EADS and BAE Systems. On 16 June 2003 the minority shareholder, BAE Systems, sold its 25% share to EADS, making EADS the sole shareholder. Astrium became EADS Astrium Satellites and in a wider restructuring became the major constituent of EADS Astrium, which also included EADS Astrium Space Transportation and EADS Astrium Services. In this restructuring the former Astrium Space Infrastructure division merged with EADS Launchers & Vehicles division to form EADS SPACE Transportation, which became later EADS Astrium Space Transportation. Also, Paradigm Secure Communications, initially created by Astrium in the frame of the Skynet 5 contract for the UK Ministry of defence became the major constituent of EADS SPACE Services. CASA Espacio became part of EADS Astrium on 1 January 2004. EADS Astrium was the sole shareholder of Infoterra Ltd. On 1 July 2006, the French subsidiary of EADS Astrium, EADS Astrium SAS, merged with other French subsidiaries of EADS Space (especially EADS Space Transportation).

==== Cassidian ====
EADS Defence & Security Systems was founded on 1 July 2003. In it, the activities of missile systems (LFK-Lenkflugkörpersysteme GmbH), defence electronics, military aircraft and telecommunications of the EADS Group were merged. On 17 September 2010 the company name was changed to Cassidian, an amalgamation of the Latin words Cassida (helmet) and meridian. It focused on worldwide protection and security. Cassidian was further subdivided into Missiles (missile systems), defence Electronics (defence electronics, such as sensors, electronics and mission avionics), Cassidian Air Systems (production and maintenance of military aircraft) Defence & Communication Systems (defence and Communications Systems) and Services (military service). In 2012 a new division was incorporated as Cassidian Cybersecurity GmbH, headquartered in Ottobrunn.

=== Post merger (2013–present) ===
Airbus Defence and Space was formed in 2013 as a result of the merger of Astrium, Cassidian, and the Airbus Military divisions of European Aeronautic Defence and Space Company (EADS) which was itself reorganised as Airbus. On 1 January 2014, the parent company EADS was restructured as Airbus, comprising three subsidiary companies that include Airbus Defence and Space, Airbus, and Airbus Helicopters.

On 16 September 2014, after a detailed and comprehensive portfolio assessment, Airbus Defence and Space defined Space (Launchers & Satellites), Military Aircraft, Missiles and related Systems and Services as its future core businesses. Some business areas were identified as divestment candidates as they did not fit the strategic goals for the company. Under this plan, the commercial and para-public communication business (including Professional Mobile Radio and commercial satellite communications services activities) was divested. Subsidiaries and J.V. including Fairchild Communications, Rostock System-Technik, AVdef, ESG and Atlas Electronik were divested. On 18 March 2016 the company decided to sell its defence electronics business (Defence Electronics) based in Ulm to Kohlberg Kravis Roberts, a global investment firm with a wide-ranging portfolio including Hospital Corporation of America, NXP Semiconductors, TDC A/S, and Dollar General. From January 1, 2017. the group reorganised under the brand name of "Airbus". The subsidiaries Airbus, Airbus Helicopters and Airbus Defence and Space became operating divisions of the same company.

In April 2022, Airbus Defence and Space acquired the German-based cryptography and communication systems company, DSI Datensicherheit GmbH.

Structural evolution of Airbus SE
Dec 1970
Jan 1992
July 2000
Sep 2000
Jan 2001
Dec 2006
Apr 2009
Sep 2010
Jan 2014
May 2015
Jan 2017
Apr 2017

European Aeronautic Defence and Space Company NV
Airbus Group NV
Airbus Group SE
Airbus SE

Airbus Industrie GIE
Airbus SAS

Airbus Military SAS
Airbus Defence and Space SAS

EADS Defence and Security
Cassidian SAS

Astrium SAS
EADS Astrium SAS

Eurocopter SA
Eurocopter SAS
Airbus Helicopters SAS

== Organisation ==
Airbus Defence and Space is structured into three business lines:

- Air Power: Develops, builds and supports military aircraft systems, both manned and unmanned. It supplies a range of fixed-wing aircraft used in combat, transport, and refuelling operations. Notable platforms include the Eurofighter Typhoon, A400M, A330 MRTT, C295, Eurodrone, and Future Combat Air System. This business line manages the company's 37.5% stake in MBDA, a company that produces missiles.
- Connected Intelligence: Develops, builds and supports secure communications and data systems for defence, government, civil, and commercial clients. Its work spans four programme areas: Space Digital, Public Safety and Security, Cyber, and Defence Digital.
- Space Systems: Develops, builds and supports civil and military satellites for telecommunications, Earth observation, navigation, and scientific missions. It also develops ground infrastructure. This business line manages the company's 50% stake in ArianeGroup, a joint venture between Airbus and Safran that provides space launch services.

== Aircraft ==
=== Tankers and transport aircraft ===
==== A330 MRTT ====
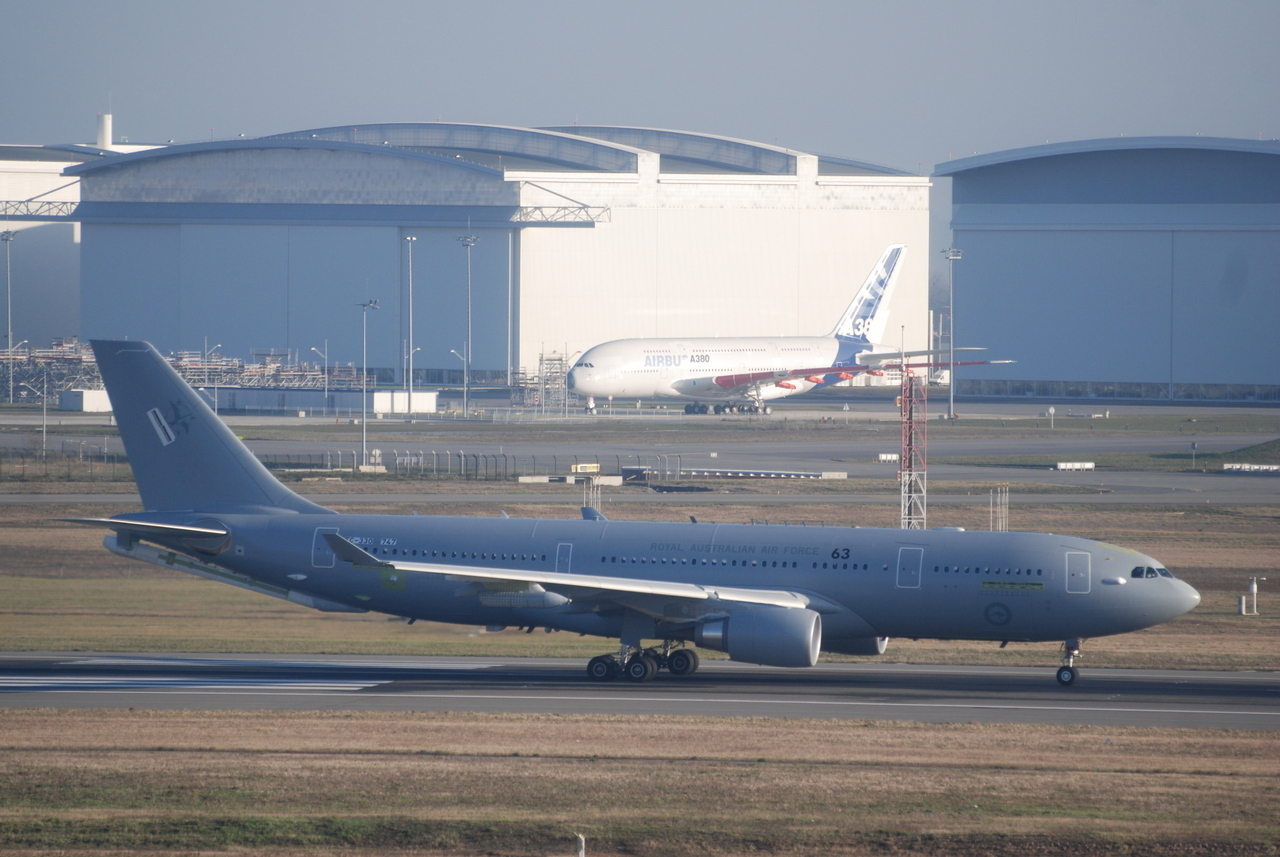
First Airbus A330 MRTT

The A330 Multi-Role Tanker Transport (MRTT) is an aerial refuelling aircraft based on the Airbus A330 airliner. It has been ordered by multiple operators, including the Royal Australian Air Force (RAAF), Royal Saudi Air Force, United Arab Emirates Air Force, Royal Air Force (RAF), and Republic of Singapore Air Force (RSAF). A variant, the EADS/Northrop Grumman KC-45, was proposed for the United States Air Force.

==== A400M Atlas ====
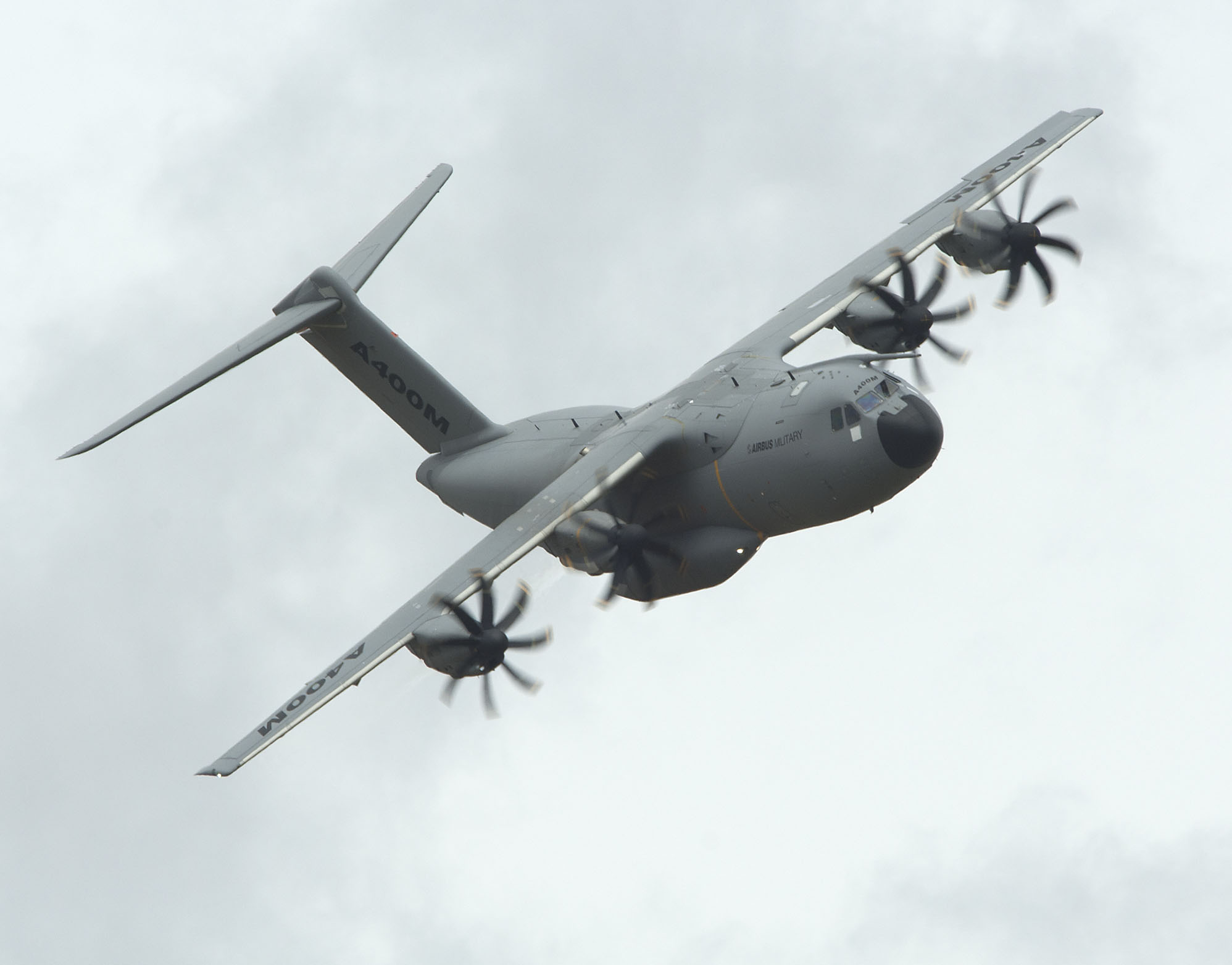
Airbus A400M Atlas

The Airbus A400M Atlas is a four-engine turboprop military transport aircraft designed for tactical airlift and limited strategic airlift missions. It serves as a replacement for aircraft such as the Transall C-160 and the Lockheed C-130 Hercules, and bridges the gap between the C-130 and the Boeing C-17 Globemaster III. The A400M can also use rough landing strips, perform aerial refuelling and medical evacuation when appropriately equipped.

==== C-212 Aviocar ====
The CASA C-212 Aviocar is a turboprop STOL medium transport aircraft originally developed by Construcciones Aeronáuticas SA (CASA) in Spain for civil and military use. It has also been produced under licence by Indonesian Aerospace (previously known as IPTN).

==== CN-235 ====
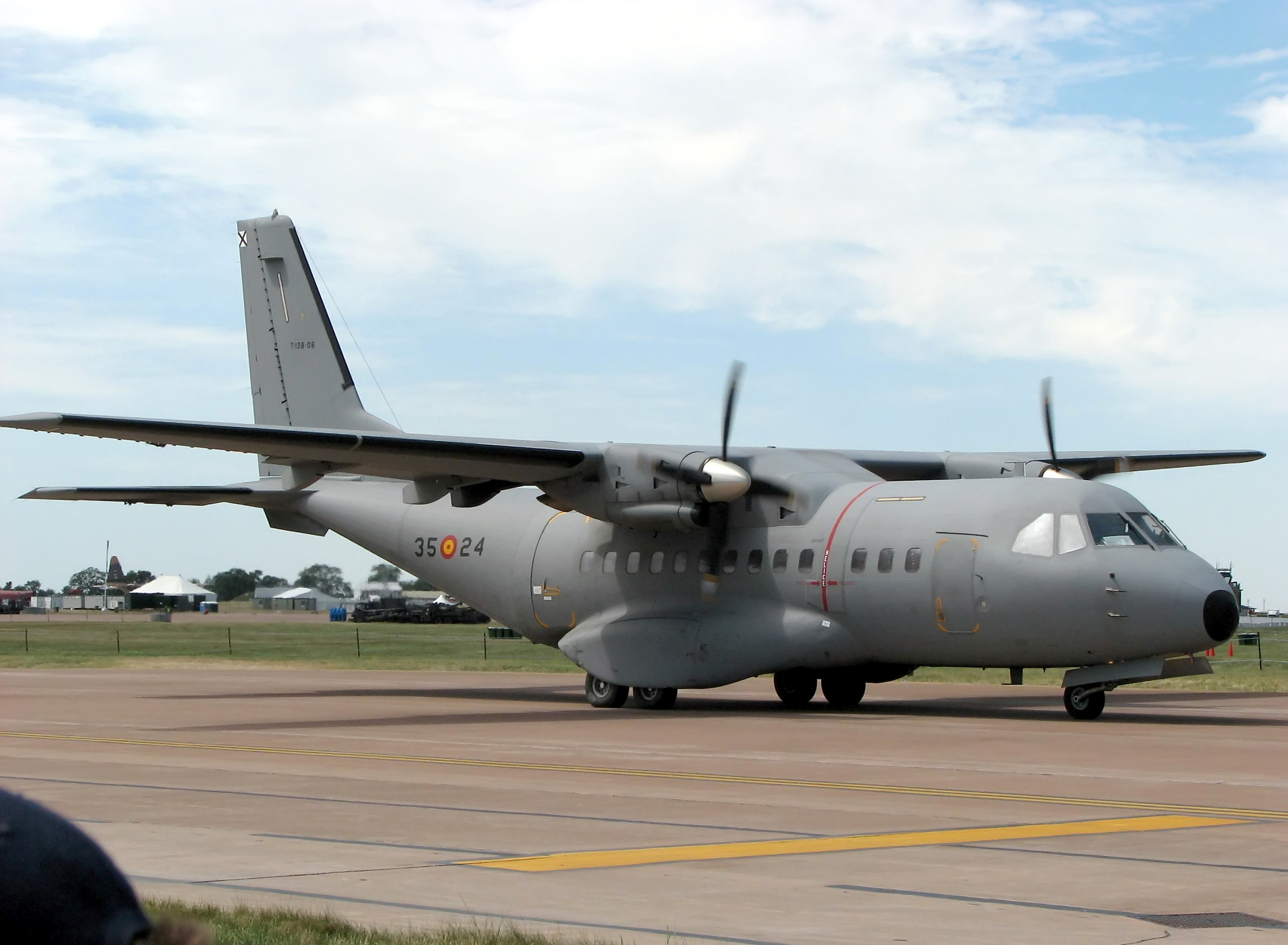
CASA CN-235M-100 of the Spanish Air Force

The CASA/IPTN CN-235 is a medium-range twin-engine transport aircraft jointly developed by CASA and IPTN. It is used for maritime patrol, surveillance, and air transport, with Turkey being its largest operator.

==== CN-295 ====
The EADS CASA C-295 is a twin-turboprop tactical military transport aircraft originally developed by CASA.

=== Fighter aircraft ===
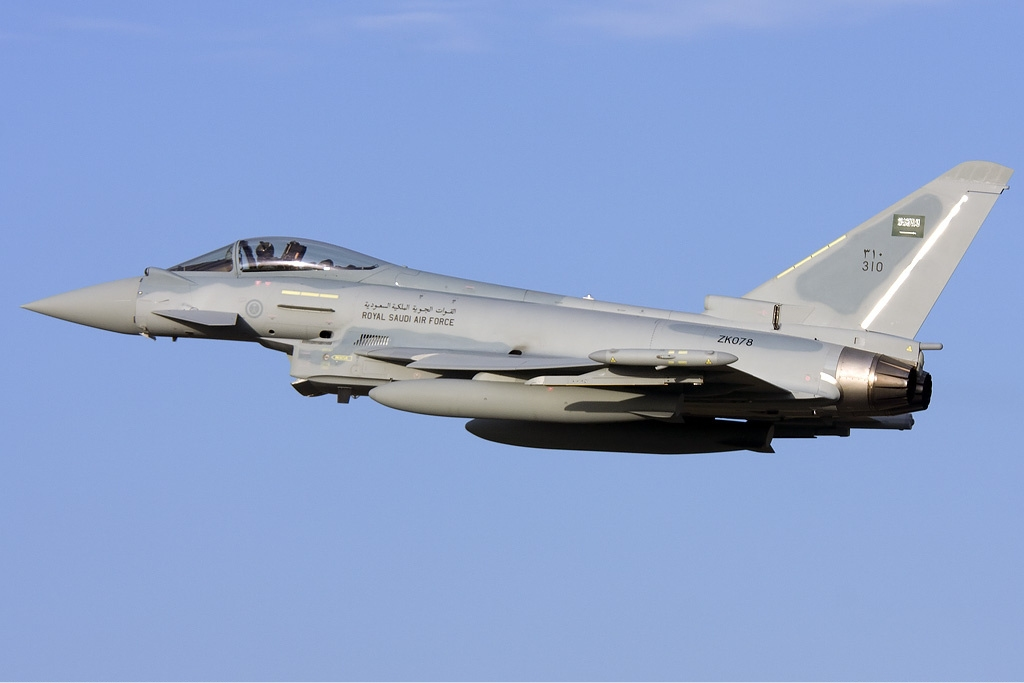
Eurofighter Typhoon

==== Panavia Tornado ====
The Panavia Tornado is a family of twin-engine, variable-sweep wing multi-role combat aircraft, developed by Panavia Aircraft, a consortium of Airbus (42.5%), BAE Systems (42.5%) and Leonardo (15%) with the NATO Eurofighter and Tornado Management Agency (NETMA) acting as the prime customer. Near a thousand Tornado aircraft were manufactured between 1979 and 1998.

==== Eurofighter Typhoon ====
The Eurofighter Typhoon is a twin-engine, canard-delta wing, multi-role combat aircraft developed by Eurofighter GmbH, a consortium of Airbus (46%), BAE Systems (33%) and Leonardo (21%) with the NETMA acting as the prime customer.

==== New Generation Fighter ====
The New Generation Fighter (NGF) is under development as part of the Future Combat Air System (FCAS) programme. Airbus is also developing the Airbus Future Jet Trainer (AFJT) as a trainer for FCAS operations.

=== Unmanned aerial vehicles ===
Tracker is a short-range mini unmanned aerial vehicles (UAV) with two low noise electric engines operated by a two-man team. This fully automatic unmanned aircraft can be deployed in all weather conditions, flat terrain, mountainous areas or urban environments.

Barracuda is a multi-sensor system, designed as a demonstrator for test missions such as fast reconnaissance, surveillance, targeting and battle damage assessment, and is used as a testbed for future aerial systems technologies and procedures.

European HALE RPAS is a long-endurance UAV system designed for surveillance, reconnaissance and target acquisition. The main purpose of the European UAS is to provide wide-area ground and maritime surveillance along with reconnaissance of specific areas.

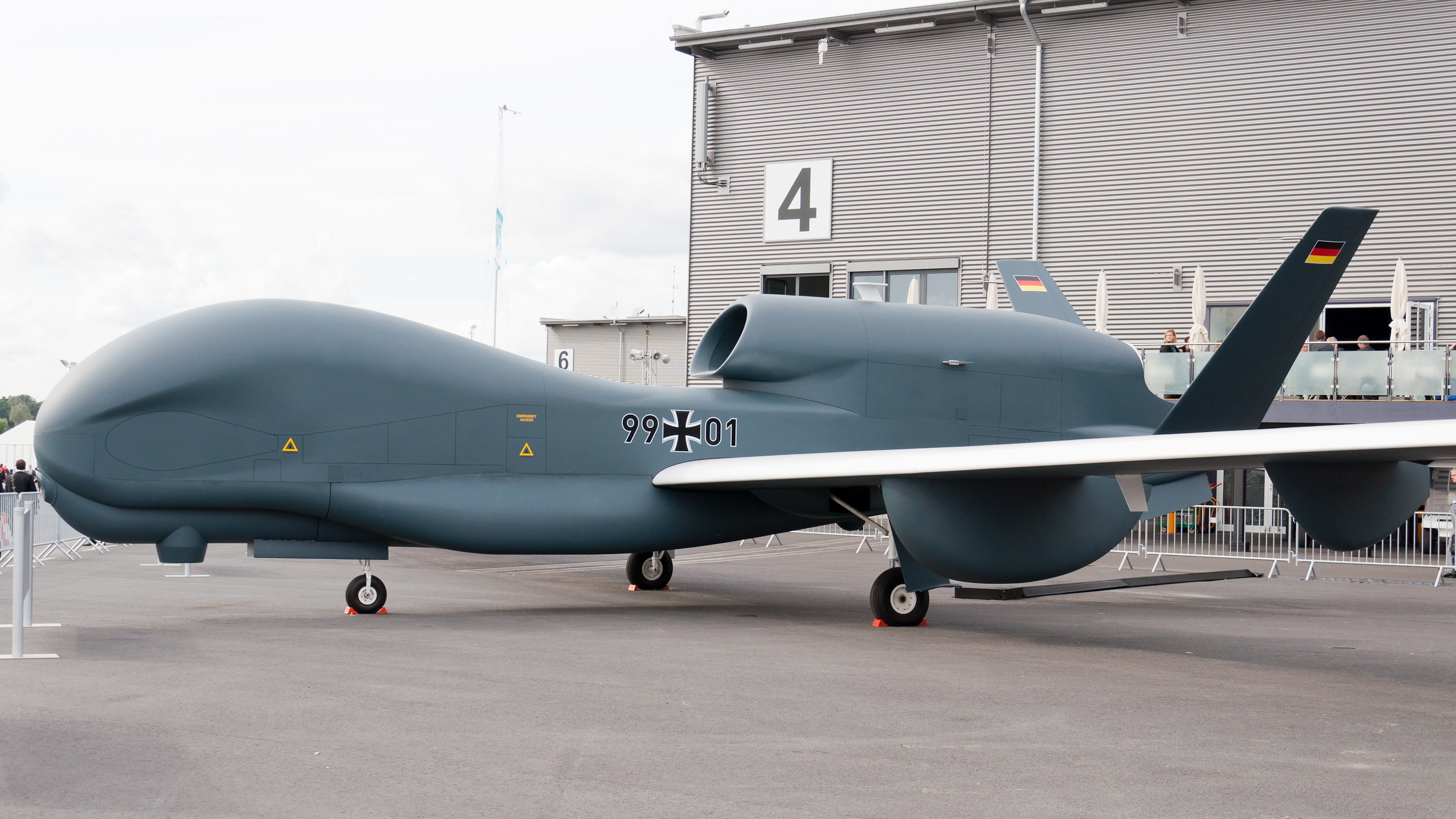
Euro Hawk

Euro Hawk was based on the Northrop Grumman RQ-4B Global Hawk and was to be equipped with an Airbus Defence and Space-built signal intelligence package; it was intended to fulfil Germany's requirement to replace their aging Dassault-Breguet Atlantique electronic surveillance aircraft of the Marineflieger (the German naval air arm). The Airbus sensor package is composed of six wing-mounted pods; reportedly these sensor pods could potentially be used on other platforms, including manned aircraft.

DVF 2000 VT is a short-range mini UAV with a low noise electric motor. It is an unmanned aircraft for maritime and land surveillance.

KZO is a tactical UAV with a two-stroke gasoline engine. It is an unmanned aircraft for high-speed reconnaissance missions. The gathered information is immediately available and can quickly be distributed in the command structure.

Harfang is a medium-altitude long-endurance UAV for joint armed forces. It can fulfil a wide range of missions, from surveillance to sensitive peacekeeping. Harfang provides real-time information and can be controlled either manually from the ground control station or autonomously.

ATLANTE is a tactical UAV for intelligence, surveillance, and reconnaissance missions by day and night for ground forces.

In March 2023, Airbus announced the company have achieved in-flight autonomous guidance and control of a drone using an A310 MRTT. The company stated the aim of the technology is to achieve Autonomous Air-to-Air refuelling (A4R) and Autonomous Formation Flight for the development of future aerial operations for both manned and unmanned assets.

In June 2024, Airbus unveiled a mock for the Airbus Wingman, an unmanned loyal wingman fighter aircraft designed to accompany the Eurofighter Typhoon, at the 2024 ILA Berlin Air Show.

=== Experimental aircraft ===
Airbus Defence and Space has a series of experimental aircraft called Zephyr, lightweight solar-powered UAV originally designed and built in 2003 by the British company QinetiQ. The development of the aircraft is ongoing and currently part of the Airbus High Altitude Pseudo-Satellite (HAPS) programme. It is intended to provide both surveillance and connectivity solutions for months at a time.

=== Ballistic missiles ===
In May 2016, Airbus and Safran agreed that their joint venture would work on upgrading the M51 submarine-launched ballistic missile to the M51.3 standard for the French Navy.

== Space systems ==
=== Launchers ===
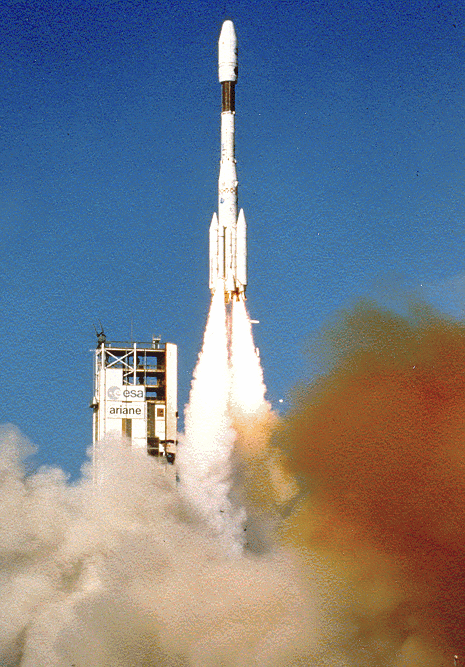
Ariane 4

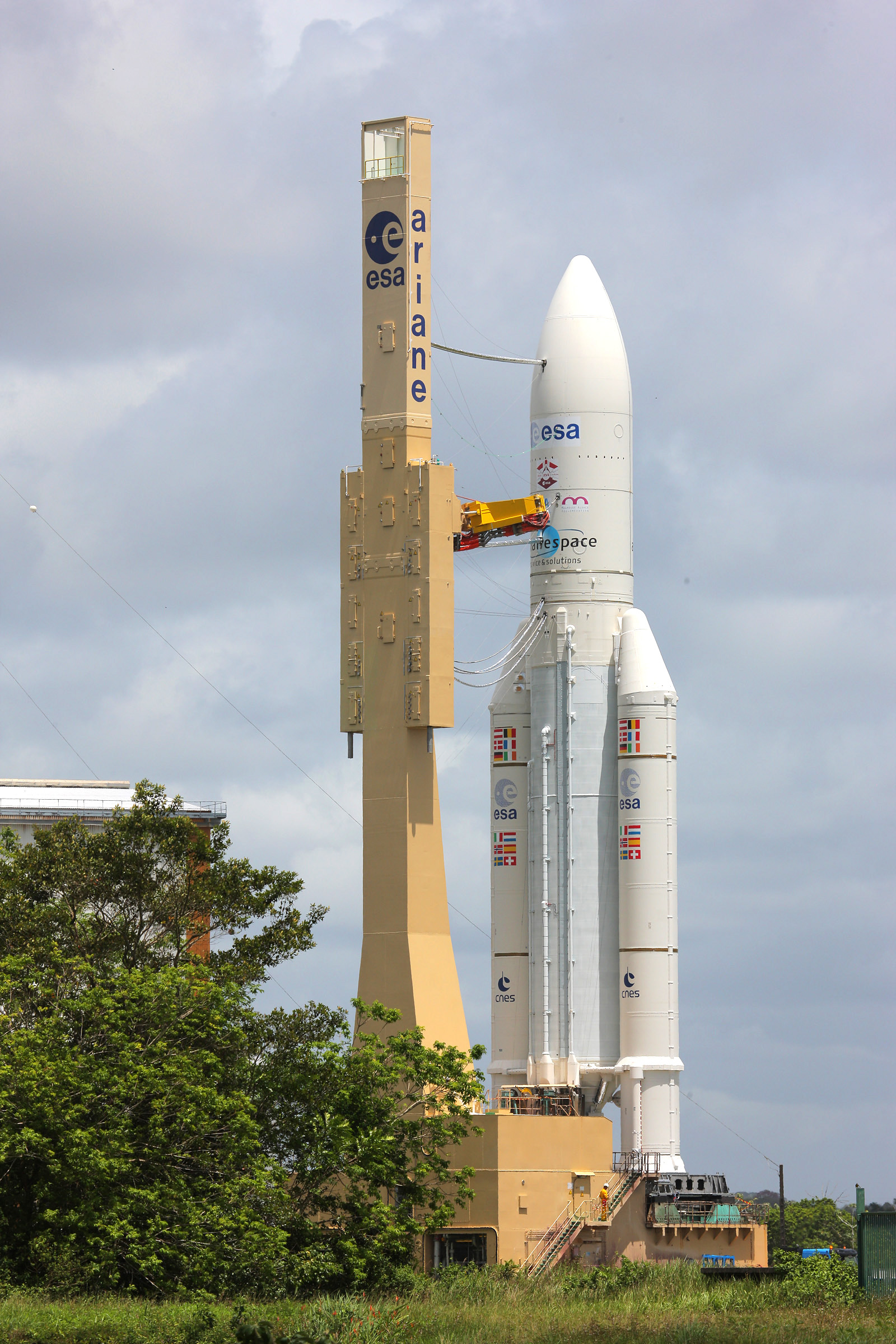
Ariane 5

Ariane is a series of a European civilian expendable launch vehicles for space launch operated from 1973 onwards. It is a collaboration between France, Germany and the UK. The Ariane project was code-named L3S (the French abbreviation for third-generation substitution launcher). The European Space Agency (ESA) charged the EADS subsidiary Astrium, presently Airbus Defence and Space, with the development of all Ariane launchers and of the testing facilities, while Arianespace, a 32.5% CNES commercial subsidiary created in 1980, handles production, operations and marketing. Arianespace launches Ariane rockets from the Guiana Space Centre at Kourou in French Guiana. Ariane 5 completed its 74th consecutive successful mission in October 2016.

=== International Space Station ===
Automated Transfer Vehicle, originally Ariane Transfer Vehicle (ATV), was an expendable cargo spacecraft developed by the European Space Agency (ESA). ATVs supplied the International Space Station (ISS) with propellant, water, air, payloads, and experiments. ATVs also reboosted the station into a higher orbit.

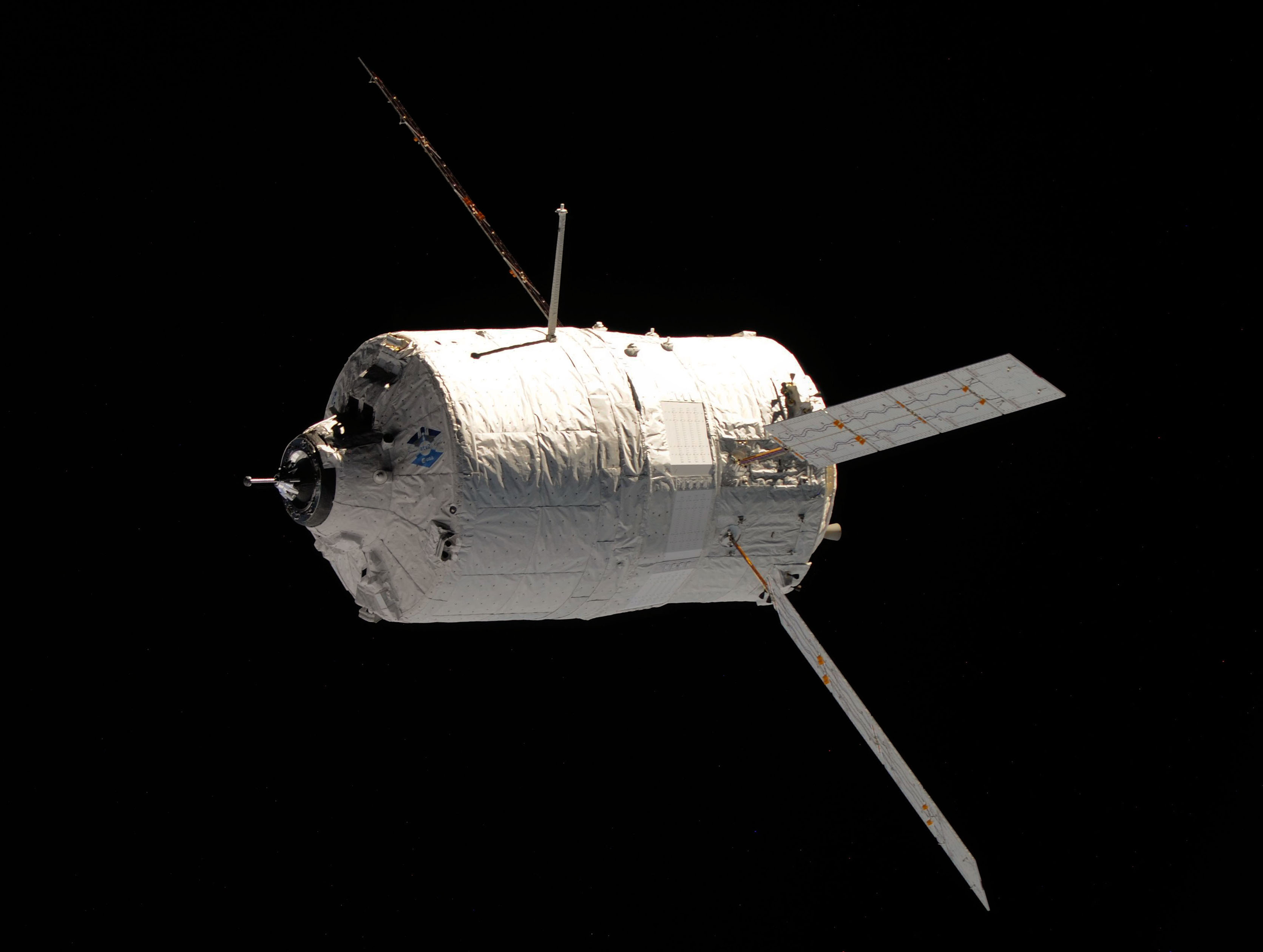
ATV

Columbus is a science laboratory that is part of the International Space Station (ISS) and is the largest single contribution to the ISS made by the European Space Agency (ESA). The functional architecture (including software) of the lab was designed by Airbus Defence and Space in Bremen, Germany where it was also integrated before being flown to the Kennedy Space Center (KSC) in Florida in an Airbus Beluga. It was launched aboard Space Shuttle Atlantis on 7 February 2008 on flight STS-122.

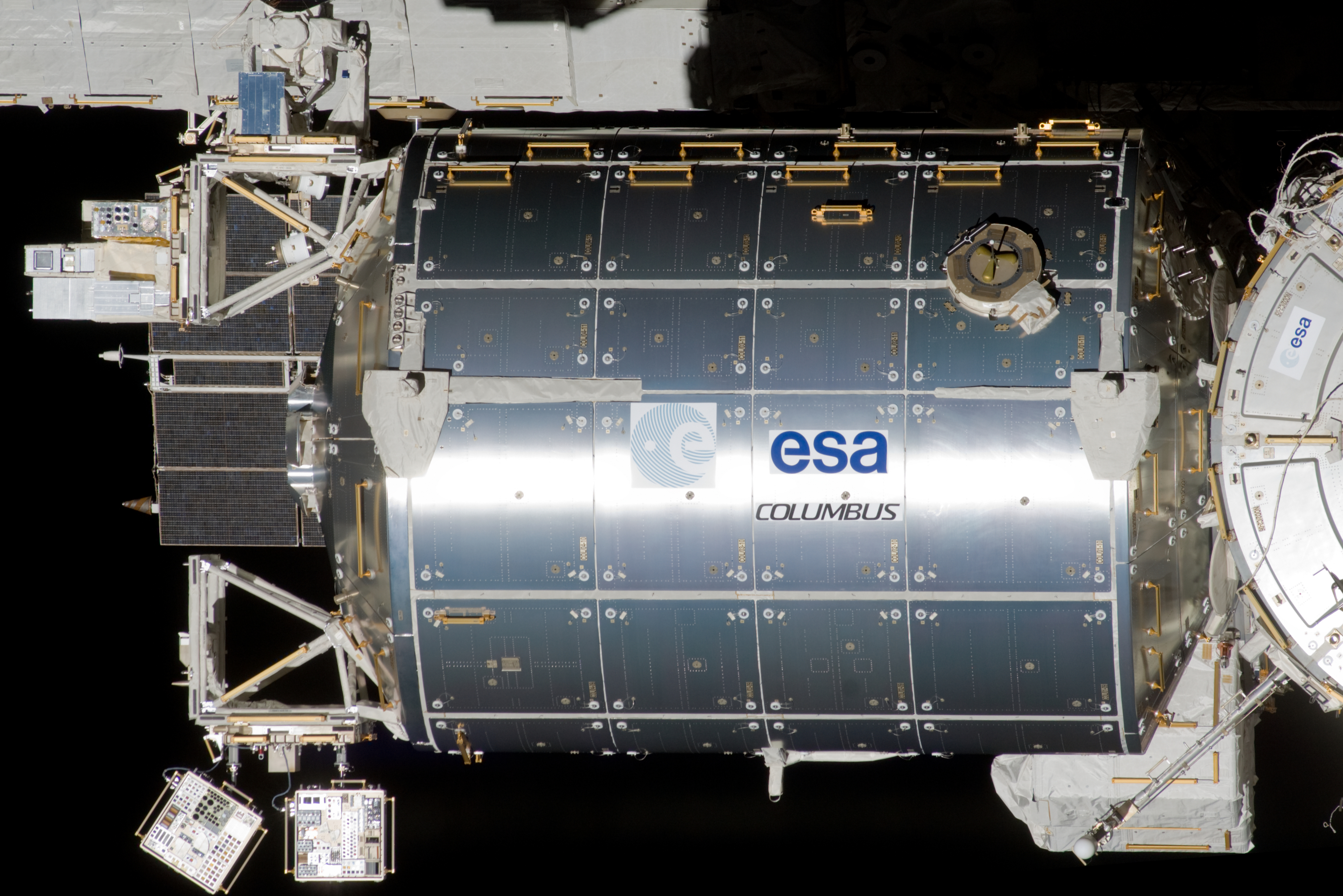
Columbus ISS Module

=== Space transportation ===
The Orion service module is the service module component of the Orion spacecraft, serving as its primary power and propulsion component until it is discarded at the end of each mission. In January 2013, NASA announced that the European Space Agency (ESA) will construct the service module for Artemis 1, replacing the previous design. Based on ESA's Automated Transfer Vehicle (ATV), the new design is also known as the European service module (ESM). The service module supports the crew module from launch through separation prior to reentry. It provides in-space propulsion capability for orbital transfer, attitude control, and high-altitude ascent aborts. It provides the water and oxygen needed for a habitable environment, generates and stores electrical power, and maintains the temperature of the vehicle's systems and components. This module can also transport unpressurised cargo and scientific payloads.

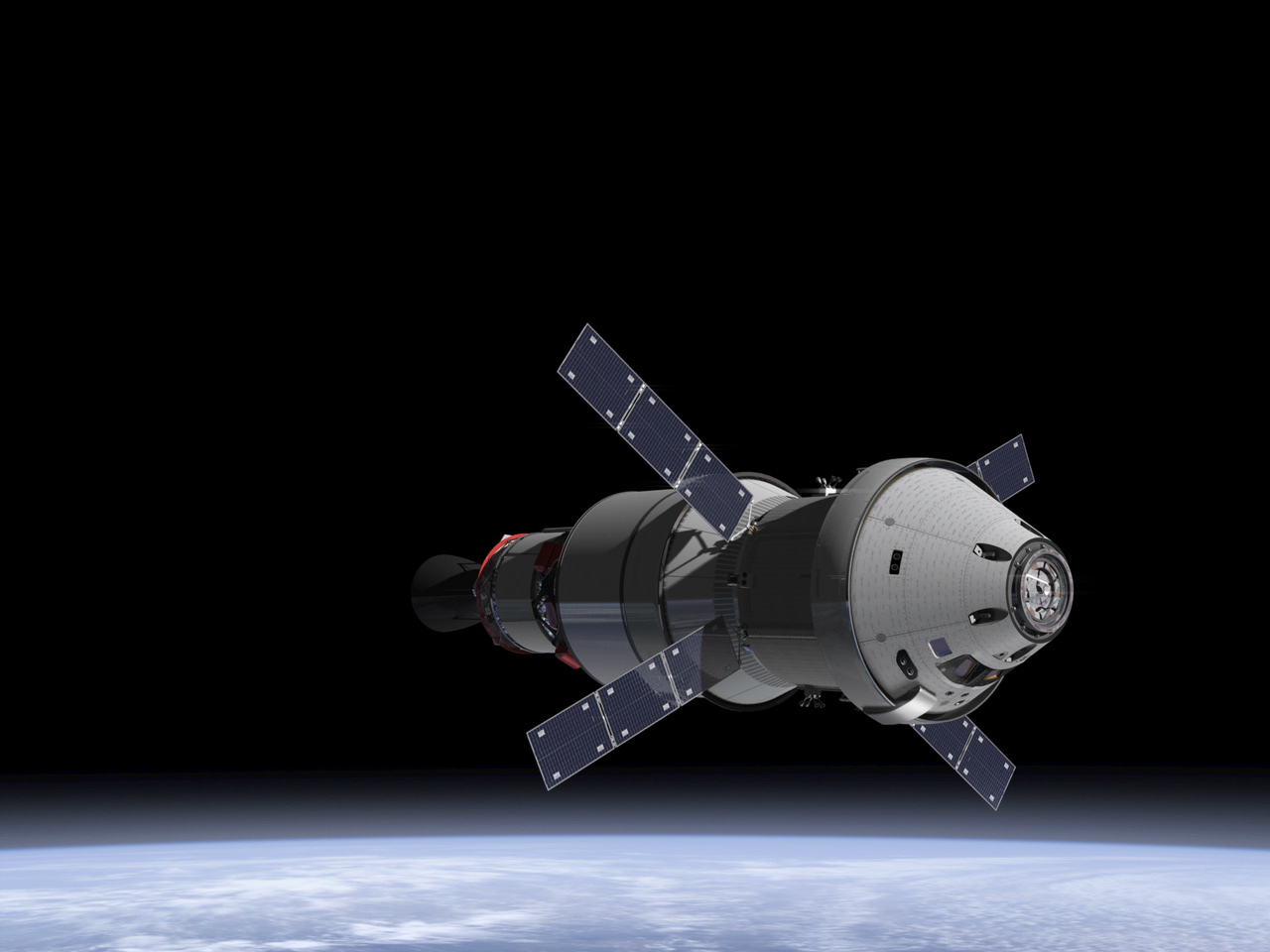
Orion service module

=== Astronomy and cosmology missions ===
Euclid (developed jointly with Thales Alenia Space) is a space mission currently under development by the European Space Agency (ESA). The objective of Euclid is to better understand dark energy and dark matter by accurately measuring the acceleration of the universe. To achieve this, the spacecraft will measure the redshift of galaxies at varying distances from Earth and investigate the relationship between distance and redshift.

LISA Pathfinder, formerly Small Missions for Advanced Research in Technology-2 (SMART-2), is an ESA spacecraft that was launched on 3 December 2015. The mission will test technologies needed for the Evolved Laser Interferometer Space Antenna (eLISA), an ESA gravitational wave observatory planned to be launched in 2034. The scientific phase started on 8 March 2016 and will last 6 months.

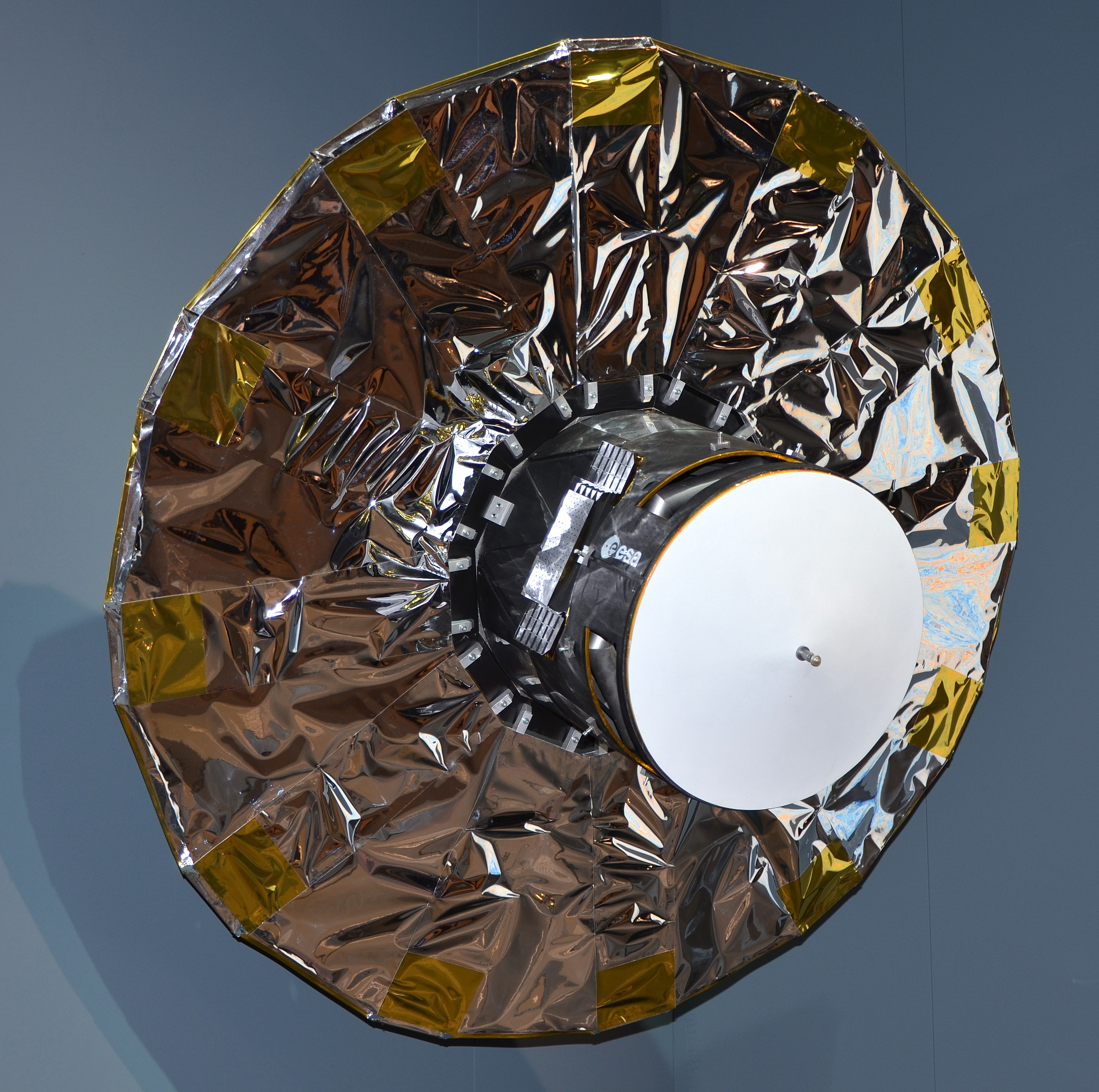
Gaia

Gaia is a space observatory of the European Space Agency (ESA) designed for astrometry. The mission aims to construct the largest and most precise 3D space catalog ever made and totalling approximately 1 billion astronomical objects, mainly stars but also planets, comets, asteroids and quasars among others.

=== Solar observation missions ===
Solar Orbiter (SolO) is a Sun-observing satellite, developed by the European Space Agency (ESA). The mission was launched with an Atlas V from the Cape Canaveral AFS in Florida at 5:03 Central European Time (CET) on 10 February 2020. SolO is intended to perform detailed measurements of the inner heliosphere and nascent solar wind, and perform close observations of the polar regions of the Sun, which is difficult to do from Earth, both serving to answer the question 'How does the Sun create and control the heliosphere?' The Solar Orbiter will make observations of the Sun from an eccentric orbit moving as close as ~60 solar radii (R_{S}), or 0.284 astronomical units (AU), placing it inside Mercury's perihelion of 0.3075 AU and providing it with the closest ever views of the Sun.

=== Planetary science missions ===
The ExoMars rover is a planned robotic Mars rover, part of the international ExoMars programme led by the European Space Agency and the Russian Roscosmos State Corporation. The plan calls for a Russian launch vehicle, an ESA carrier module and a Russian lander that will deploy the rover to Mars's surface. The ExoMars Trace Gas Orbiter, launched in 2016, will operate as the rover's data-relay satellite. The spacecraft was scheduled to launch in July 2020.

BepiColombo is a joint mission of the European Space Agency (ESA) and the Japan Aerospace eXploration Agency (JAXA) to the planet Mercury. The mission comprises two satellites which were launched together: the Mercury Planetary Orbiter (MPO) and the Mercury Magnetospheric Orbiter (MMO). The mission will perform a comprehensive study on Mercury, including its magnetic field, magnetosphere, interior structure and surface. The launch on an Ariane 5 took place on 20 October 2018. The mission was approved in February 2007 as part of the Cosmic Vision programme.

Jupiter Icy Moons Explorer (JUICE) is an active European Space Agency (ESA) spacecraft designed by Airbus Defence and Space to visit the Jovian system, focused on studying three of Jupiter's Galilean moons: Ganymede, Callisto, and Europa (excluding the more volcanically active Io). It will characterise these three worlds, all of which are thought to have significant bodies of liquid water beneath their surfaces, making them potentially habitable environments. The selection of this mission for the L1 launch slot of ESA's Cosmic Vision science programme was announced on 2 May 2012. It is currently in its cruise phase.

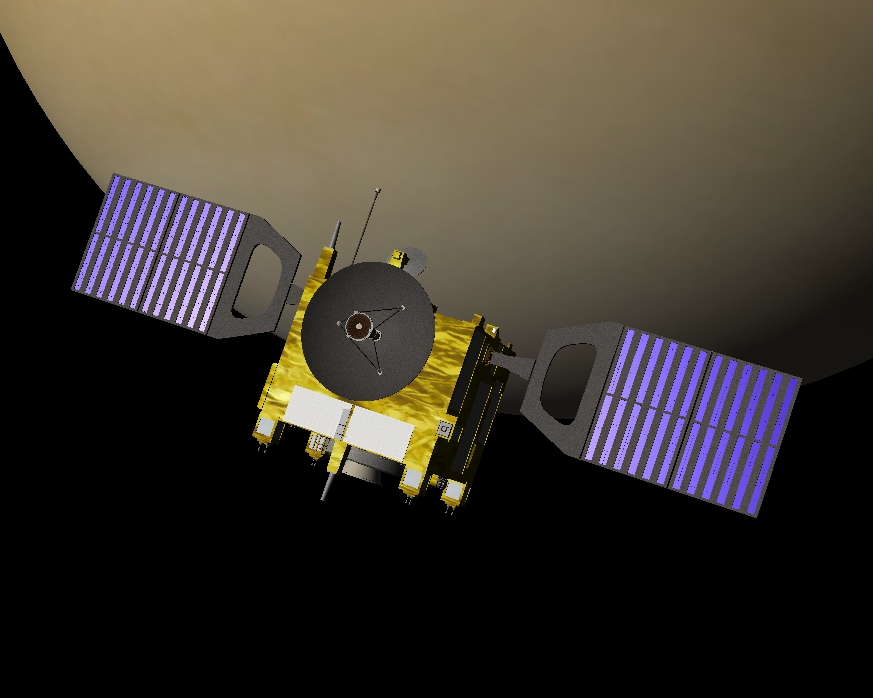
Venus Express

Venus Express was the first Venus exploration mission of the European Space Agency (ESA). Launched in November 2005, it arrived at Venus in April 2006 and began continuously sending back science data from its polar orbit around Venus. Equipped with seven scientific instruments, the main objective of the mission was the long-term observation of the Venusian atmosphere. The observation over such long periods of time had never been done in previous missions to Venus and was key to a better understanding of the atmospheric dynamics.

Mars Express is a space exploration mission being conducted by the European Space Agency (ESA). The Mars Express mission is exploring the planet Mars and is the first planetary mission attempted by the agency.

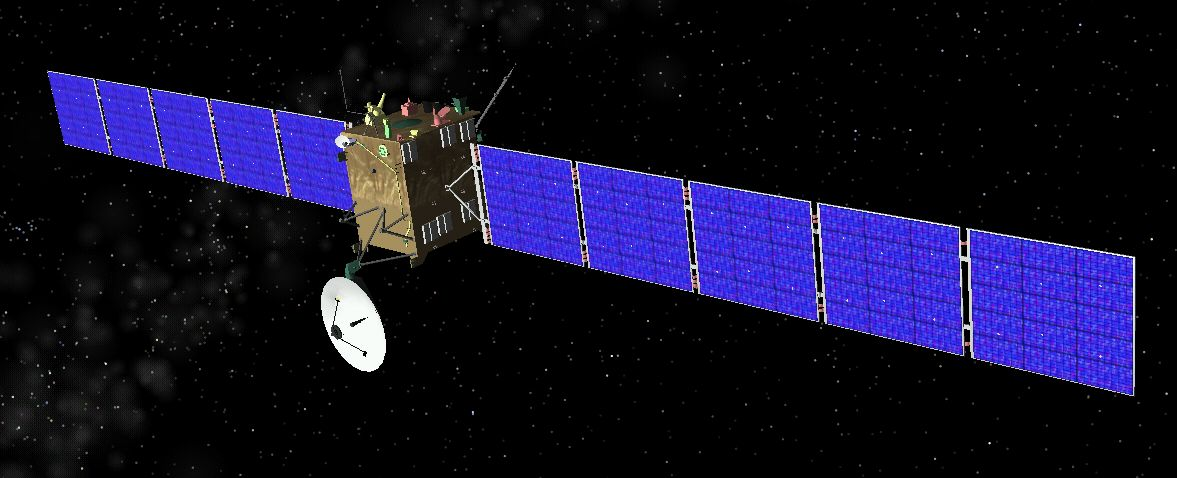
Rosetta

Rosetta was a space probe built by the European Space Agency launched on 2 March 2004. Along with Philae, its lander module, Rosetta performed a detailed study of comet 67P/Churyumov–Gerasimenko (67P). During its journey to the comet, the spacecraft flew by Mars and the asteroids 21 Lutetia and 2867 Šteins.

=== Earth observation satellites ===
Airbus Defence and Space is the world's largest supplier of Earth observation systems with more than fifty satellites launched and 18 more under construction. The following are some of their artificial satellites

- TerraSAR-X NG: A next-generation development based on the TerraSAR-X mission.
- AstroBus-L: A platform suited for high-performance Earth observation satellites such as the Pleiades Twin satellites and the SPOT satellite system.
- Xpress: Low-cost synthetic aperture radar (SAR) satellite system particularly suitable for surveillance applications in a constellation concept.
- AstroBus-S: Earth observation satellites for very-high-resolution (VHR) applications.
- AstroBus-XS: Modernised and enhanced version of the very successful Myriade-based satellite family.
- Oberon satellites: synthetic aperture radar (SAR) satellites for British military intelligence.

Some of the major satellite systems built are: Envisat (the world's largest civilian Earth observation satellite.), Earth Explorers such as GOCE, GRACE, Swarm, EarthCARE, Sentinel Missions, MetOp and MetOp-SG.

=== Telecommunication satellites ===
Airbus Defence and Space has manufactured over a hundred communications satellites.

Eurostar: Used for a series of spacecraft providing telecommunications services in geosynchronous orbit (GEO). More than 70 Eurostar satellites have been ordered to date, of which more than 55 have been successfully launched since October 1990 and have proven highly reliable in operational service. In December 2013, the Eurostar satellites accumulated 500 years of successful operations in orbit. The Eurostar spacecraft series is designed for a variety of telecommunications needs, including fixed services and broadcast, mobile services, broadband and secured communications.

Some of the major telecommunication satellites built are: Alphabus, the Eutelsat series, the Astra series, the Hispasat series, the Inmarsat series, and the UK military Skynet series.

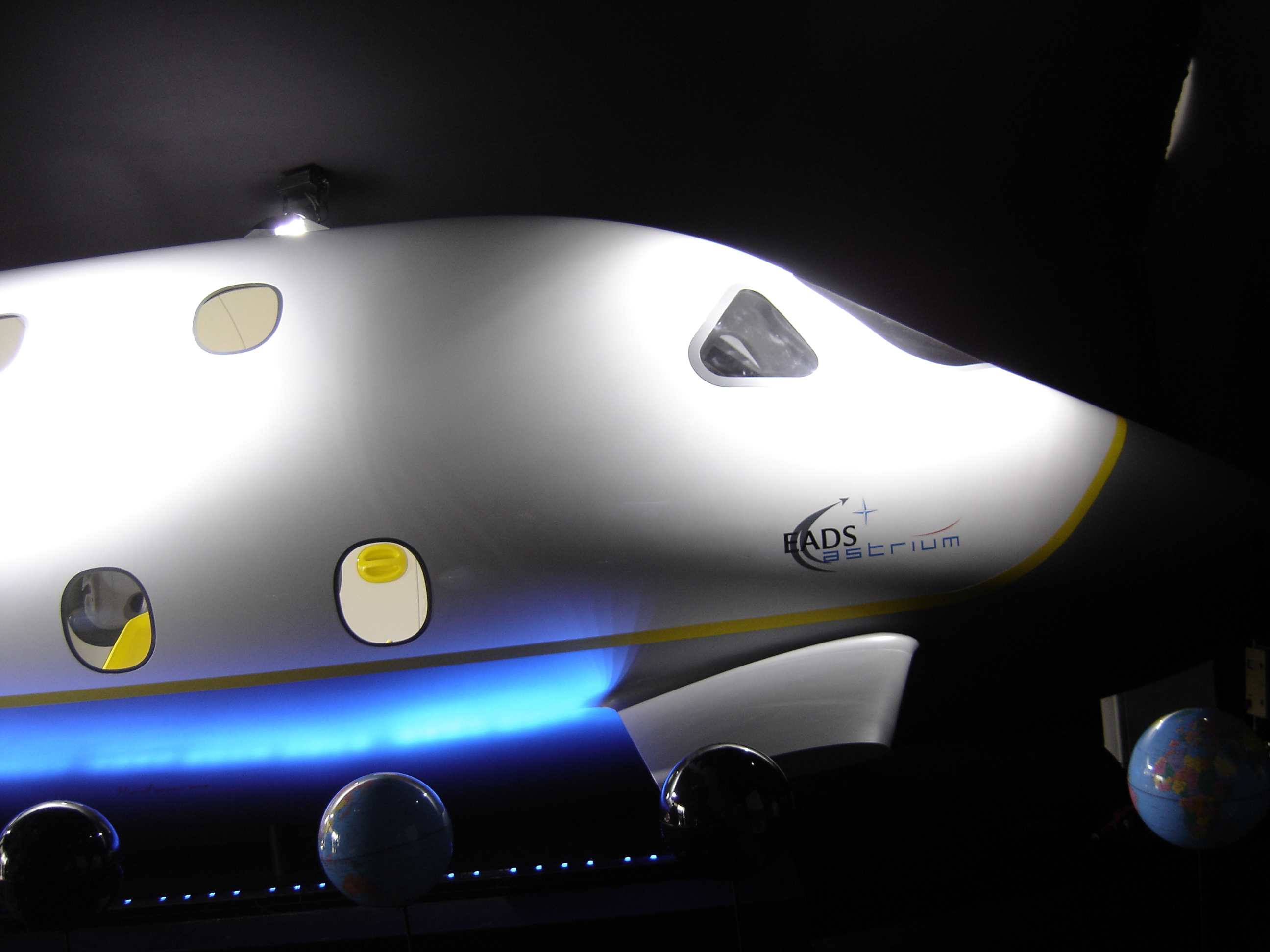
Airbus Defence and Space Spaceplane prototype

=== Spaceplane ===
Airbus Defence and Space Spaceplane was a suborbital spaceplane concept for carrying space tourists, proposed by Airbus Defence and Space. A full-size mockup was officially unveiled in Paris, France, on 13 June 2007, and is now on display in the Concorde hall of the Musée de l'Air et de l'Espace. The project was the first space tourism entry by a major aerospace contractor.

=== Rocket engines ===
Airbus Defence and Space also produces commercial versions of its proprietary rocket engines such as HM7B, Aestus, Vinci and Vulcain.

=== One Atlas ===
Airbus Defence and Space launched One Atlas in October 2016, a new satellite image basemap which covers the earth landmasses with imagery. The images available via Google Drive can be accessed around the clock and are refreshed within a 12-month period. One Atlas was developed for defence or security missions and operations, for example, assisting in the mapping, reporting, and updating of positions, movements, or risk areas, but also providing intelligence when selecting transportation routes and access points.

=== Starlab joint venture ===
On 9 January 2024 Airbus Defence and Space announced the formation of Starlab Space LLC, a joint venture with Voyager Space to design, construct and operate the Starlab commercial space station.

== Sites ==
Major European Airbus Defence and Space sites are located in the following places:

- France: Elancourt, Vélizy, Les Mureaux, Bordeaux, Toulouse and Kourou in French Guiana
- Germany: Manching, Friedrichshafen, Ottobrunn/Taufkirchen, Bremen and Immenstaad am Bodensee
- Spain: Getafe (Madrid), Sevilla and Albacete.
- United Kingdom: Newport, Portsmouth and Stevenage
- Italy: Rome and Potenza
- Netherlands: Leiden
- South Africa: Irene

Airbus Defence and Space announced in September 2022 that it would establish a research facility at Lot Fourteen, Adelaide, South Australia, in October, with the aim of developing new satellites for the Australian Defence Force.

== See also ==
- Boeing defence, Space & Security
- Lockheed Martin Space Systems
- Northrop Grumman
- Raytheon
- Thales Alenia Space
