= Astrium =

Former aerospace manufacturer

- Industry: Space industry, Space tourism
- Predecessor: EADS Space
- Founded: December 2006
- Founder: EADS
- Defunct: 2013
- Successor: Airbus Defence and Space
- Headquarters: Paris, France
- Revenue: €5.8 billion (2012)
- Number of employees: 18,000 (as of 2012)
- Parent: EADS
- Website: www.astrium.eads.net

Astrium was a European aerospace company and subsidiary of the European Aeronautic Defence and Space Company (EADS), headquartered in Paris. It designed, developed and manufactured civil and military space systems and provided related services from 2006 to 2013. In 2012, Astrium had a turnover of €5.8 billion and 18,000 employees in France, Germany, the United Kingdom, Spain and the Netherlands. Astrium was a member of Institute of Space, its Applications and Technologies.

In late 2013 Astrium was merged with Cassidian, the defence division of EADS, as well as Airbus Military to form Airbus Defence and Space. EADS itself was rebranded Airbus Group, with three divisions: Airbus Commercial Aircraft, Airbus Defence and Space, and Airbus Helicopters.

== Business structure ==
During 2006–2013, the three main areas of activity within Astrium were:

- Astrium Satellites for spacecraft and ground segment
- EADS Astrium Space Transportation for launchers and orbital infrastructure
- Astrium Services for the development and delivery of satellite services.

=== Satellites ===
Astrium Satellites was one of the three business units of Astrium. It was specialized in the manufacturing of spacecraft used for science, Earth observation and telecommunications, as well as the equipment and subsystems used therein and related ground systems.

EADS Astrium Satellites employed around 8,348 people on nine sites in France, Germany, Spain and the United Kingdom. As of 15 October 2012, the CEO of Astrium is Eric Beranger who took over from Evert Dudok.

== History ==
Astrium was formed in 2000 by the merger of Matra Marconi Space (itself formed from French and British companies) with the space division of DaimlerChrysler Aerospace AG and Computadores Redes e Ingeniería SA. Henceforth Astrium was a joint venture between EADS and BAE Systems.

On 16 June 2003 the minority shareholder, BAE Systems, sold its 25% share to EADS, making EADS the sole shareholder. Astrium became EADS Astrium Satellites and in a wider restructuring became the major constituent of EADS Astrium, which also included EADS Astrium Space Transportation and EADS Astrium Services. In this restructuring the former Astrium Space Infrastructure division merged with EADS Launchers & Vehicles division to form EADS SPACE Transportation, which became later EADS Astrium Space Transportation. Also, Paradigm Secure Communications, initially created by Astrium in the frame of the Skynet 5 contract for the UK Ministry of Defence became the major constituent of EADS SPACE Services.

CASA Espacio became part of EADS Astrium on 1 January 2004. EADS Astrium is the sole shareholder of Infoterra Ltd.

On 1 July 2006, the French division of EADS Astrium, EADS Astrium SAS, merged with other French subsidiaries of EADS Space (especially EADS Space Transportation). The name of the new company thus became Astrium SAS. Equivalent mergers have been achieved in 2006 in the other countries.

== Space transportation ==
EADS Astrium Space Transportation was formed in June 2003 from the consolidation of EADS' launch vehicles division (formerly Aérospatiale's space division) and the space infrastructure division of Astrium (whose core was originally ERNO). Until July 2006 it was called EADS Space Transportation and was a fully owned subsidiary of EADS Space. In July 2006 the three subsidiaries of EADS Space (EADS Space Transportation, EADS Astrium, and EADS Space Services) were reintegrated into one company, EADS Astrium, of which EADS Astrium Space Transportation became a business division. Currently 4397 employees work in the launcher segment.

The Space Transportation company is the prime contractor for the Ariane 5 launcher, the Columbus Module of the International Space Station, and the ATV, as well as a number of smaller projects (most notably Phoenix). It also builds launchers for the French nuclear missile program (see also Military of France), such as the M51 SLBM.

It joined the team led by Lockheed Martin for a bid on NASA's Crew Exploration Vehicle (CEV), being in charge of the craft's Mission Module. The team won a contract from NASA in June 2005.

In 2005, EADS Astrium Space Transportation started a campaign in favour of a project called LIFE, for astronomy from the Moon surface.

The company has facilities in France (Les Mureaux near Paris and Saint-Médard-en-Jalles near Bordeaux) and in Germany; the main facility in Germany is located in Bremen. These manufacturing facilities utilise specialist CTH03 and CTH04 high technology equipment containers which allow the safe transport of Airbus integrated spacecraft in a horizontal position when sending them worldwide to launch sites.

After Evert Dudok took over from Antoine Bouvier as Head of EADS Astrium Satellites on 11 June 2007, Alain Charmeau assumed responsibility of the management of EADS Astrium Space Transportation.

== Programmes ==
=== Telecoms ===
- Alphabus
- Alphasat I-XL
- Amazonas 1 & 2
- Anik F1R & F3
- Arabsat 4A, 4B, 5A & 5C & BADR-4, 5, 6 & 7
- Astra 2B, 2E, 2F, 2G, 1M, 1N, 3B, & 5B
- Direct TV 15
- Eutelsat Atlantic Bird 7
- Eutelsat W1
- Eutelsat W2M
- Eutelsat W3A
- Eutelsat 3B
- Eutelsat MEA-SAT 3B
- Eutelsat W5A
- Hellas-Sat
- Hispasat 1A and 1B
- HYLAS
- Eutelsat Hot Bird 2-5
- Eutelsat Hot Bird 7-10
- Eutelsat Ka-Sat
- Express AM4, AM4R
- Express AM7
- Inmarsat-2 F1, F2, F3 & F4
- Inmarsat-4 F1, F2 & F3
- Intelsat 10-02
- Nilesat 101 and 102
- Nimiq 4
- Orion-1
- ST-1
- Stentor
- Telecom 2
- WorldStar (Afristar, Asiastar, Worldstar 3)
- Yahsat 1A & 1B

=== Military ===
- CSO (forthcoming)
- Essaim
- Helios 1B
- Helios 2A
- Manpack
- Master
- Scot
- Skynet 4/NATO IV
- Skynet 5
- SATCOM BW2
- Spirale 1A/1B

=== Earth observation ===
- EarthCARE
- ADM-Aeolus
- Alsat
- Champ
- COMS
- CryoSat
- ERS 1 & 2
- Envisat
- EOS Aqua HSB
- GOCE
- Grace
- Kompsat-2
- KRS [forthcoming, launch forecast 2014]
- MSG
- Meteosat
- Metop 1, 2, 3
- MicroSAR
- Pleiades
- FORMOSAT-2 (ROCSAT-2)
- Sentinel 2
- Sentinel-5 Precursor
- Silex
- SPOT 1, 2, 3, 4 & 5
- SSOT
- Swarm
- Theos
- TerraSAR-X, TanDEM-X
- VNREDSat-1 (forthcoming)

=== Science ===
- BepiColombo
- Cassini-Huygens
- Cluster II
- Gaia mission
- Herschel Space Observatory
- INTEGRAL
- LISA Pathfinder
- Mars Express / Beagle 2
- Rosetta
- Solar and Heliospheric Observatory (SOHO)
- Solar Orbiter
- Ulysses
- Venus Express
- XMM-Newton
- NIRSpec

=== Navigation ===
- European Geostationary Navigation Overlay Service (EGNOS)
- Galileo

=== Services ===
Astrium Services is the services division of EADS Astrium.

The services division specializes in military satellite communications services and currently employs about 2,200 personnel.

Astrium Services is responsible for delivering the following services and systems:

- ASTEL-S, France
- TELCOMARSAT, France
- SATCOMBw, Germany (2009)
- Skynet: provides all the UK Ministry of Defence satellite communications.
- NATO service provision to Portugal and Canada
- Galileo (2010)

=== Space tourism ===
Logo used until 2010

In June 2007, EADS Astrium announced it would be entering the space tourism sector. On 20 June 2007 the company unveiled a model of the space jet, a one-stage sub-orbital hybrid craft, utilising both jet and rocket engines. Carrying four passengers, the space jet would take off from regular airports using conventional jet engines. After flying to the needed altitude, the rockets would then be fired. After reaching its final altitude of 100 km, passengers would experience weightlessness for three minutes. Tickets were expected to cost up to €200,000 with flights possibly beginning in 2012. EADS estimated the development cost would approach 1 billion Euros. In March 2009 EADS Astrium confirmed that the programme had been placed on hold indefinitely; the decision had been made in January of that year.

=== On-orbit satellite servicing ===
In September, 2012, Astrium won a €13 million mission definition and design contract from the DLR Space Administration to build a two-vehicle set of spacecraft to demonstrate several technologies necessary for on-orbit satellite servicing, including spacecraft refuelling, in order to enable satellite mission extension and also controlled disposal of a defective satellite. The project is entitled "DEOS" (German orbital servicing mission), and consists of two satellites, a 'client' and a 'servicer'. The client acts as the satellite requiring maintenance or disposal. The servicer carries out the necessary work on the client. The two spacecraft will be launched together into low Earth orbit of 550 kilometres (340 mi). As of 2012, the mission "will be ready for launch in 2018."

=== Partnership ===
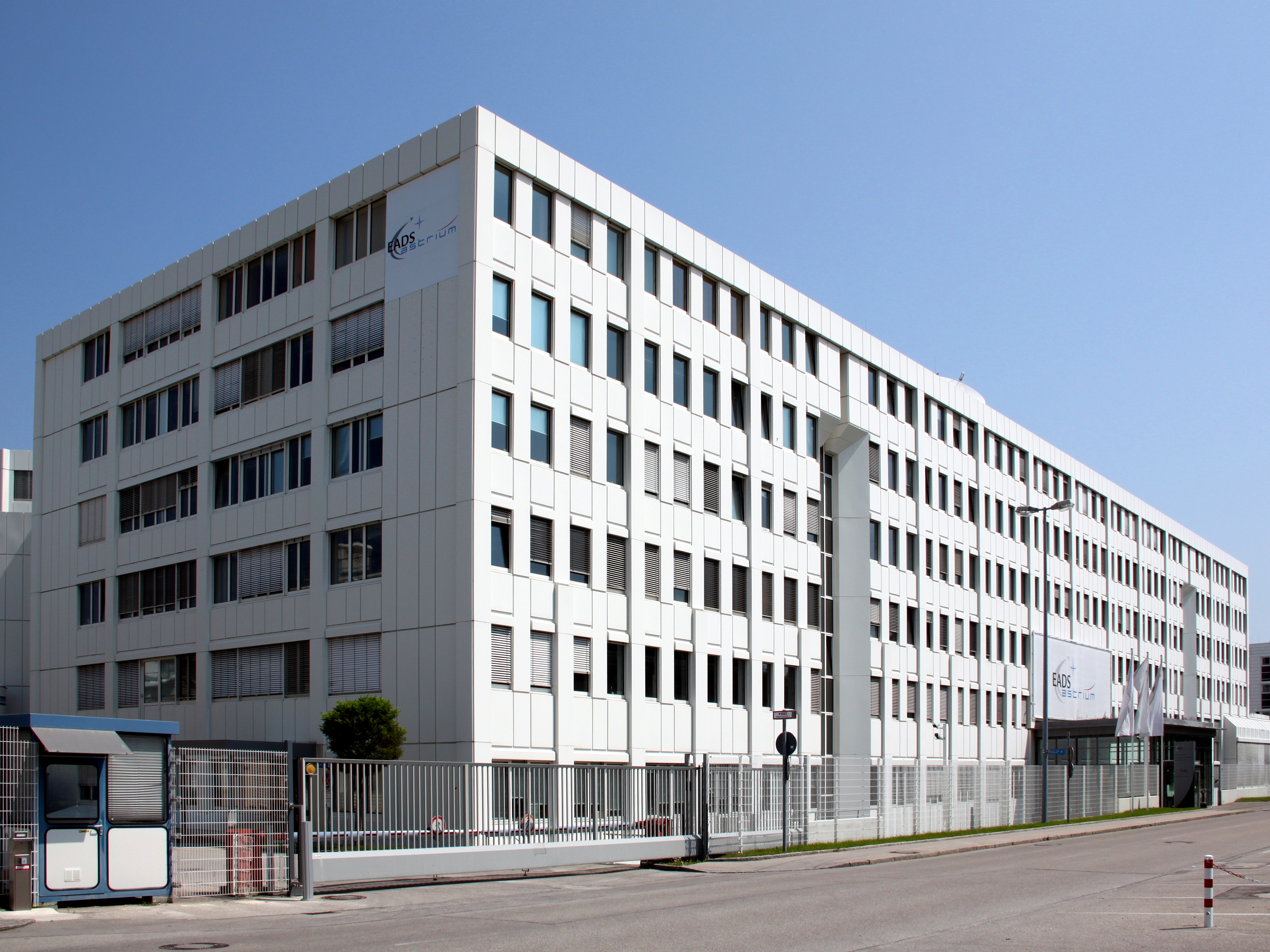
Taufkirchen, Germany: EADS Astrium (main building)

In 2010 Astrium signed with JSC NC Kazakhstan Gharysh Sapary (KGS), the national company charged with the development of Kazakhstan's space programme, a contract for a Satellite Assembly, Integration and Test (AIT) Centre in Astana. Under the contract Astrium will provide and install the various test equipment (mechanical, radiometric, thermal and acoustic facilities) at the new AIT Centre. Astrium will also assist KGS in the construction of the AIT Centre to ensure coordination with the test equipment. The AIT Centre will form part of the Space City that the Kazakhstan space agency, Kazcosmos, is developing in Astana. The city will also include the ground segment for the two Astrium-built satellites, as well an administrative building and a space museum.

Structural evolution of Airbus SE
Dec 1970
Jan 1992
July 2000
Sep 2000
Jan 2001
Dec 2006
Apr 2009
Sep 2010
Jan 2014
May 2015
Jan 2017
Apr 2017

European Aeronautic Defence and Space Company NV
Airbus Group NV
Airbus Group SE
Airbus SE

Airbus Industrie GIE
Airbus SAS

Airbus Military SAS
Airbus Defence and Space SAS

EADS Defence and Security
Cassidian SAS

Astrium SAS
EADS Astrium SAS

Eurocopter SA
Eurocopter SAS
Airbus Helicopters SAS

== See also ==
- Aerospace industry in the United Kingdom
