= Arianespace =

European commercial space transportation company

- Type: Subsidiary
- Industry: Space
- Founded: 26 March 1980; 46 years ago
- Headquarters: Évry-Courcouronnes n. Paris, France
- Key people: David Cavaillolès (CEO)
- Revenue: ▲€1.25 billion (2021)
- Number of employees: 220 (2023)
- Parent: ArianeGroup
- Website: www.arianespace.com

Arianespace SA is a French company founded in March 1980 as the world's first commercial launch service provider. It operates the Ariane 6, a medium-to-heavy-lift rocket. Arianespace is a subsidiary of ArianeGroup, a joint venture between Airbus and Safran.

European space launches involve collaboration between private industry and government agencies. Arianespace is responsible for marketing Ariane 6 launch services, preparing missions, and managing customer relations. At the Guiana Space Centre (CSG) in French Guiana, the company oversees teams that integrate and prepare launch vehicles. The launch infrastructure at CSG is owned by the European Space Agency, while the site itself is managed by CNES, France's national space agency. The Ariane 6 rocket is designed and manufactured by ArianeGroup.

As of October 2025, Arianespace had conducted 355 missions and launched over 1,100 satellites across a span of 45 years. Its first commercial launch, Spacenet 1, took place on 23 May 1984. In addition to its operations at CSG, Arianespace maintains its headquarters in Évry-Courcouronnes, a suburb of Paris.

== History ==
The formation of Arianespace SA is closely associated with the desire of several European nations to pursue joint collaboration in the field of space exploration and the formation of a pan-national organisation, the European Space Agency (ESA), to oversee such undertaking during 1973. Prior to the ESA's formation, France had been lobbying for the development of a new European expendable launch system to serve as a replacement for the Europa rocket. Accordingly, one of the first programmes launched by the ESA was the Ariane heavy launcher. The express purpose of this launcher was to facilitate the delivery of commercial satellites into geosynchronous orbit.

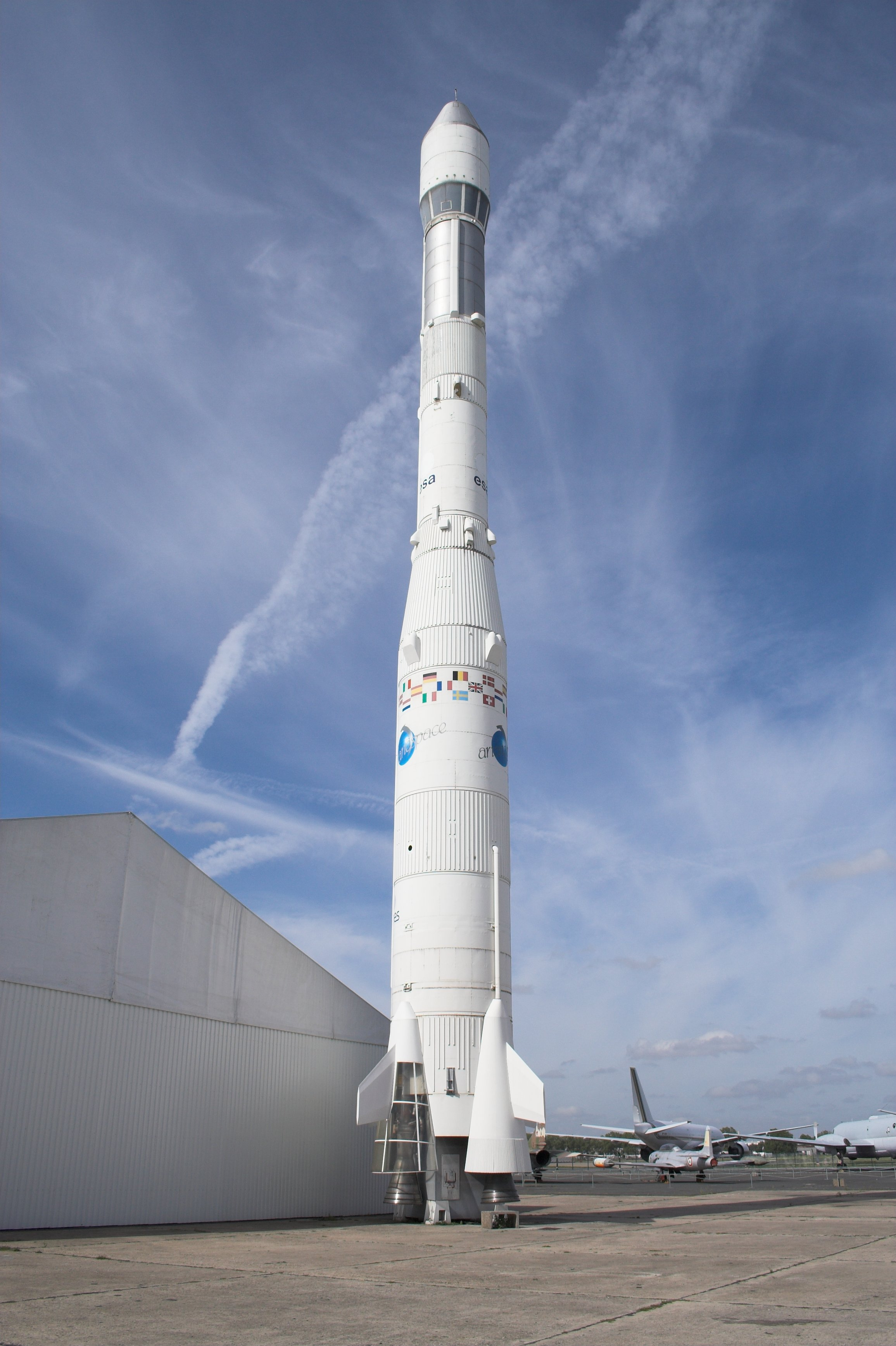
Ariane 1 mock-up

France was the largest stakeholder in the Ariane development programme. French aerospace manufacturer Aérospatiale served as the prime contractor and held responsibility for performing the integration of all sections of the vehicle, while French engine manufacturer Société Européenne de Propulsion (SEP) provided the first, second and third stage engines (the third stage engines were produced in partnership with German aerospace manufacturer MBB). Other major companies involved included the French firms Air Liquide and Matra, Swedish manufacturer Volvo, and German aircraft producer Dornier Flugzeugwerke. Development of the third stage was a major focus point for the project - prior to Ariane, only the United States had ever flown a launcher that utilised hydrogen-powered upper stages.

Immediately following the successful first test launch of an Ariane 1 on 24 December 1979, the French space agency Centre national d'études spatiales (CNES) and the ESA created a new company, Arianespace, for the purpose of promoting, marketing, and managing Ariane operations. According to Arianespace, at the time of its establishment, it was the world's first launch services company. Following a further three test launches, Arianespace's first commercial launch (and the second overall) took place on 10 September 1982, the day after the American Conestoga 1 had made the first successful commercial rocket launch into outer space. However, the Arianespace launch ended in failure as a result of a turbopump having failed in the third stage. The six remaining flights of the Ariane 1 were successful, with the final flight occurring during February 1986. As a result of these repeated successes, orders for the Ariane launcher quickly mounted up; by early 1984, a total of 27 satellites had been booked to use Ariane, which was estimated to be half of the world's market at that time. As a result of the commercial success, after the tenth Ariane mission was flown, the ESA formally transferred responsibility for Ariane over to Arianespace.

By early 1986, the Ariane 1, along with its Ariane 2 and Ariane 3 derivates, were the dominant launcher on the world market. The Ariane 2 and Ariane 3 were short-lived platforms while the more extensive Ariane 4 was being developed; it was a considerably larger and more flexible launcher that the earlier members of its family, having been intended from the onset to compete with the upper end of launchers worldwide. In comparison, while the Ariane 1 had a typical weight of 207 tonnes and could launch payloads of up to 1.7 tonnes into orbit; the larger Ariane 4 had a typical weight of 470 tonnes and could orbit payloads of up to 4.2 tonnes. Despite this, the Ariane 4 was actually 15 per cent smaller than the Ariane 3.

On 15 June 1988, the first successful launch of the Ariane 4 was conducted. This maiden flight was considered a success, having placed multiple satellites into orbit. For the V50 launch onwards, an improved third stage, known as the H10+, was adopted for the Ariane 4, which raised the rocket's overall payload capacity by 110 kg and increased its burn time by 20 seconds.

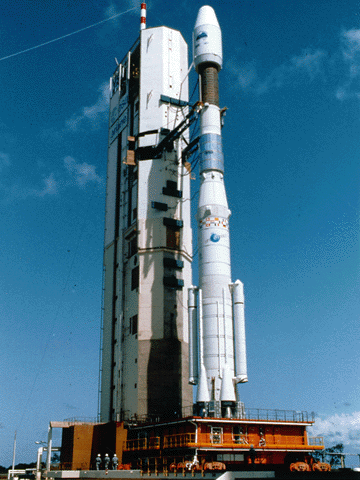
Ariane 4 on launch pad

Even prior to the first flight of the Ariane 4 in 1988, development of a successor, designated as the Ariane 5, had already commenced. In January 1985, the Ariane 5 was officially adopted as an ESA programme, and began an eleven-year development and test program to the first launch in 1996. It lacked the high levels of commonality that the Ariane 4 had with its predecessors, and had been designed not only for launching heavier payloads of up to 5.2 tonnes and at a 20 per cent cost reduction over the Ariane 4, but for a higher margin of safety due to the fact that the Ariane 5 was designed to conduct crewed space launches as well, being intended to transport astronauts using the proposed Hermes space vehicle. Development of the Ariane 5 was not without controversy as some ESA members considered the mature Ariane 4 platform to be more suited for meeting established needs for such launchers; it was reportedly for this reason that Britain chose not to participate in the Ariane 5 programme. For several years, Ariane 4 and Ariane 5 launchers were operated interchangeably; however, it was eventually decided to terminate all Ariane 4 operations in favour of concentrating on the newer Ariane 5.

During the mid-1990s, French firms Aérospatiale and SEP, along with Italian firm Bombrini-Parodi-Delfino (BPD), held discussions on the development of a proposed Ariane Complementary Launcher (ACL). Simultaneously, Italy championed the concept of a new solid-propellant satellite launcher, referred to as Vega. During March 2003, contracts for Vega's development were signed by the ESA and CNES; Italy provided 65 per cent of funding while six additional nations contributed the remainder. In May 2004, it was reported that a contract was signed between commercial operator Arianespace and prime contractor ELV to perform vehicle integration at Kourou, French Guiana. On 13 February 2012, the first launch of the Vega took place; it was reported as being an "apparently perfect flight". Since entering commercial service, Arianespace markets Vega as a launch system tailored for missions to polar and Sun-synchronous orbits.

During 2002, the ESA announced the Arianespace Soyuz programme in cooperation with Russia; a launch site for Soyuz was constructed as the Guiana Space Centre, while the Soyuz launch vehicle was modified for use at the site. On 4 February 2005, both funding and final approval for the initiative were granted. Arianespace had offered launch services on the modified Soyuz ST-B to its clients. On 21 October 2011, Arianespace launched the first Soyuz rocket ever from outside former Soviet territory. The payload consisted of two Galileo navigation satellites. Since 2011, Arianespace has ordered a total of 23 Soyuz rockets, enough to cover its needs until 2019 at a pace of three to four launches per year.

On 21 January 2019, ArianeGroup and Arianespace announced that it had signed a one-year contract with the ESA to study and prepare for a mission to the Moon to mine regolith.

In 2020, Arianespace suspended operations for nearly two months due to the COVID-19 pandemic. Operations were suspended on 18 March and are, as of 29 April, expected to resume on 11 May. The return to operations will observe a number of new health and safety guidelines including social distancing in the workplace.

In 2023, Ariane 5 was retired with the introduction of new Ariane 6, that conducted its maiden flight on 9 July 2024.

In August 2024, the ESA agreed to allow Avio—the prime contractor for the ESA-funded Vega—to directly commercialize Vega C and seek non-governmental customers. Arianespace had handled marketing of Vega launches prior to that time. The transition is anticipated to be complete by the end of 2025.

== Company and infrastructure ==
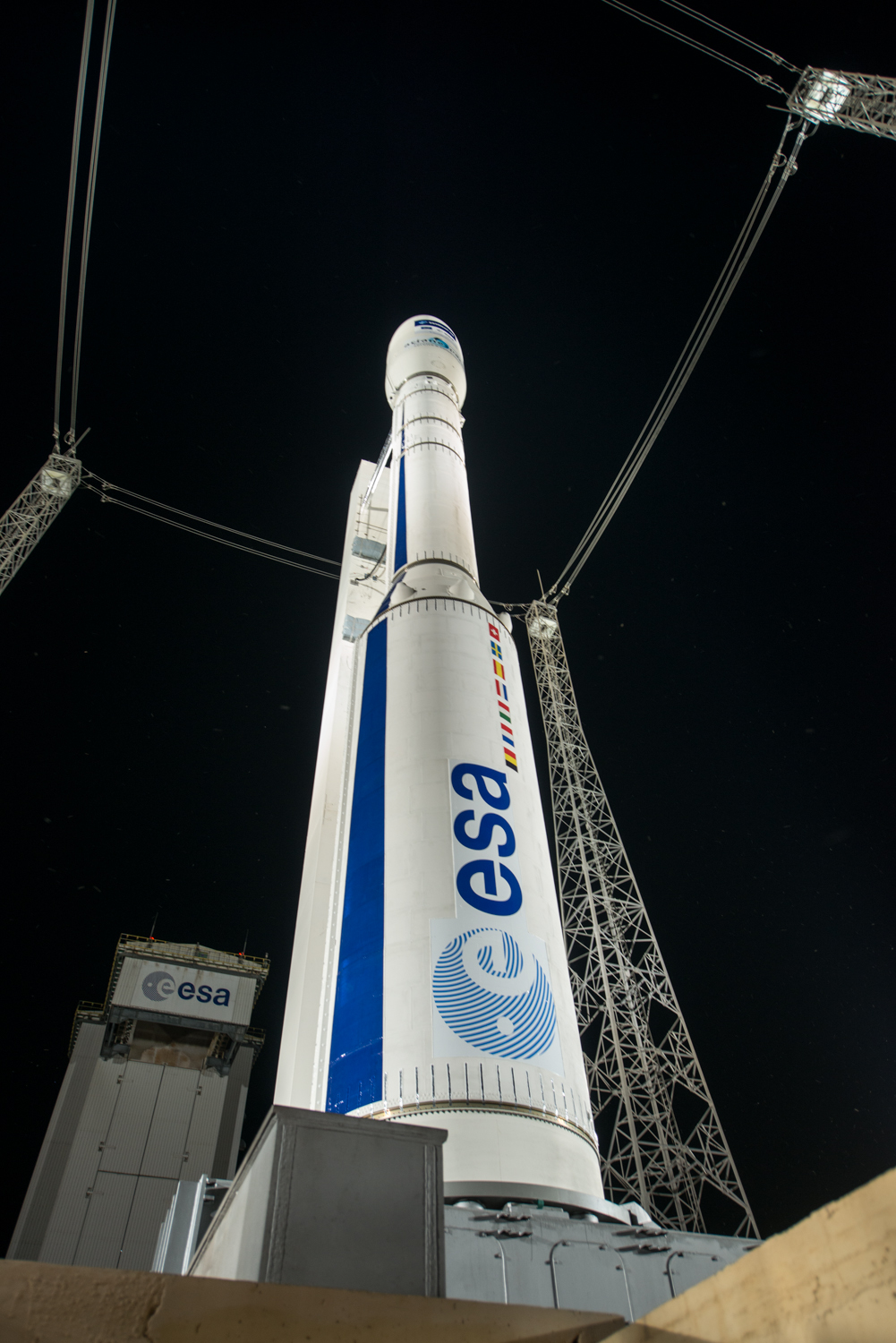
Vega launcher on launch pad

Arianespace "is the marketing and sales organization for the European space industry and various component suppliers."

The primary shareholders of Arianespace are its suppliers, in various European nations. Arianespace had 24 shareholders in 2008, 21 in 2014, and just 17 as of October 2018.

Country	Total share	Shareholder	Capital
Belgium	3.36%	SABCA	2.71%
Belgium	3.36%	Thales Alenia Space Belgium	0.33%
Belgium	3.36%	Safran Aero Boosters	0.32%
France	64.10%	ArianeGroup	62.10%
France	64.10%	Air Liquide SA	1.89%
France	64.10%	Clemessy	0.11%
France	64.10%	CIE Deutsche	<0.01%
Germany	19.85%	ArianeGroup	11.59%
Germany	19.85%	MT Aerospace AG	8.26%
Italy	3.38%	Avio S.p.A.	3.38%
Netherlands	1.94%	Airbus Defence and Space B.V.	1.94%
Norway	0.11%	Kongsberg Defence & Aerospace AS	0.11%
Spain	2.14%	Airbus Defence and Space SAU	2.03%
Spain	2.14%	CRISA	0.11%
Sweden	2.45%	GKN Aerospace Sweden AB	1.63%
Sweden	2.45%	RUAG Space AB	0.82%
Switzerland	2.67%	RUAG Schweiz AG	2.67%

In 2015, Arianespace shareholding was restructured due to the creation of Airbus Safran Launchers (later renamed ArianeGroup), which is tasked with developing and manufacturing the Ariane 6 carrier rocket. Industrial groups Airbus and Safran pooled their shares along with the French government's CNES stake to form a partnership company holding just under 74% of Arianespace shares, while the remaining 26% is spread across suppliers in nine countries including further Airbus subsidiaries.

== Competition and pricing ==
By 2004, Arianespace reportedly held more than 50% of the world market for boosting satellites to geostationary transfer orbit (GTO).

During the 2010s, the disruptive force represented by the new sector entrant SpaceX forced Arianespace to cut back on its workforce and focus on cost-cutting to decrease costs to remain competitive against the new low-cost entrant in the launch sector. In the midst of pricing pressure from such companies, during November 2013, Arianespace announced that it was enacting pricing flexibility for the "lighter satellites" that it carries to Geostationary orbits aboard its Ariane 5. According to Arianespace's managing director: "It's quite clear there's a very significant challenge coming from SpaceX (...) therefore things have to change (...) and the whole European industry is being restructured, consolidated, rationalised and streamlined."

During early 2014, Arianespace was considering requesting additional subsidies from European governments to face competition from SpaceX and unfavorable changes in the Euro-Dollar exchange rate. The company had halved subsidy support by €100m per year since 2002 but the fall in the value of the US Dollar meant Arianespace was losing €60m per year due to currency fluctuations on launch contracts. SpaceX had reportedly begun to take market share from Arianespace, Eutelsat CEO Michel de Rosen, a major customer of Arianespace, stated that: "Each year that passes will see SpaceX advance, gain market share and further reduce its costs through economies of scale."

By September 2014, Arianespace had reportedly to sign four additional contracts for lower slots on an Ariane 5 SYLDA dispenser for satellites that otherwise could be flown on a SpaceX launch vehicle; this was claimed to have been allowed via cost reductions; it had signed a total of 11 contracts by that point, while two additional ones that were under advanced negotiations. At the time, Arianespace has a backlog of launches worth €4.5 billion with 38 satellites to be launched on Ariane 5, 7 on Soyuz and 9 on Vega, claiming 60% of the global satellite launch market. However, since 2017, Arianespace's market share in commercial launches has been surpassed by SpaceX.

== Launch vehicles ==
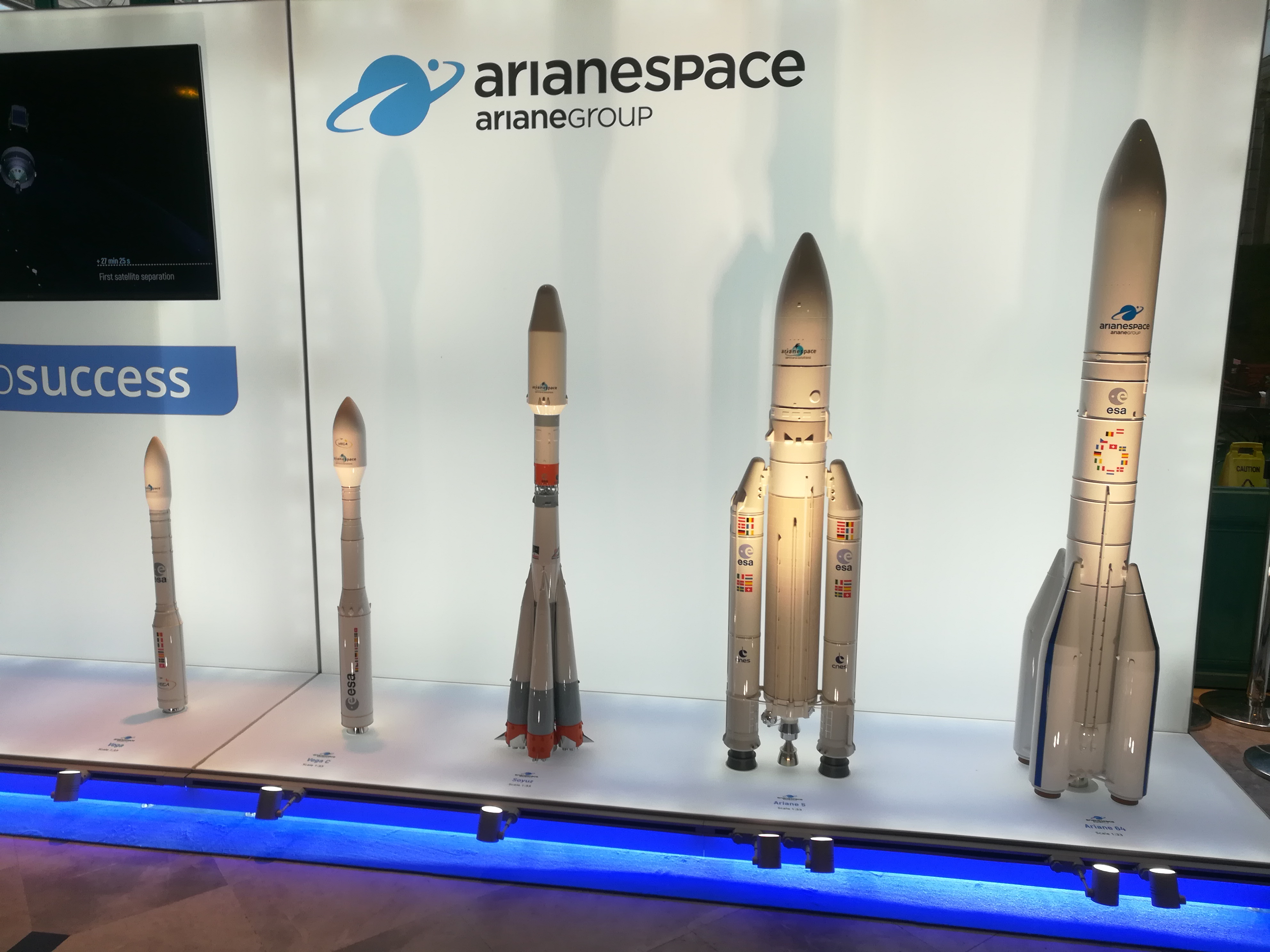
Mockups of the launch vehicles that Arianespace marketed in 2017: Vega, Vega C, Soyuz-2, Ariane 5, and Ariane 6. Sales of Vega, Soyuz-2 and Ariane 5 were discontinued, while Vega C was transferred to Avio.

Currently, Arianespace operates two launch vehicles:

Name	Payload to LEO/SSO	Payload to GTO
Ariane 62	10,350 kg (22,820 lb)	4,500 kg (9,900 lb)
Ariane 64	21,650 kg (47,730 lb)	11,500 kg (25,400 lb)

=== Ariane launch vehicles ===
Since the first launch in 1979, there have been several versions of the Ariane launch vehicle:

- Ariane 1, first successful launch on 24 December 1979
- Ariane 2, first successful launch on 20 November 1987 (the first launch on 30 May 1986, failed)
- Ariane 3, first successful launch on 4 August 1984
- Ariane 4, first successful launch on 15 June 1988
- Ariane 5, first successful launch on 30 October 1997 (the first launch on 4 June 1996, failed).
- Ariane 6, It has a similar payload capacity to that of Ariane 5 but considerably lower costs. Its first flight took place on 9 July 2024.
- Ariane Next, in early development. It will be a partially reusable launcher that should succeed Ariane 6 from the 2030s. The objective of this reusable launcher is to halve the launch costs.

== See also ==
- French space program
- Europa rocket
- NewSpace

=== Other launch service providers ===
- United Launch Alliance
- International Launch Services
- SpaceX
- Antrix Corporation
