= Evert Dudok =

Dutch businessman

Evert Dudok (born February 23, 1959, in Venlo, Netherlands) has been the President of EADS Astrium Satellites since June 2007. Prior to this date he was president of EADS Astrium Space Transportation since June 2005. Before that he was Head of Earth Observation & Science division at EADS Astrium since March 2002.

Dudok obtained a degree in Electrical Engineering Summa Cum Laude from the Technical University of Eindhoven in 1984. He started his career with DASA in Ottobrunn in 1984, where he worked many years for "Payload Antennas" activities. Since the beginning of Astrium, he was Head of the Business Unit “Navigation and constellations” in the Business Division “Telecommunication & Navigation”.

Dudok became Executive Vice President of Connected Intelligence at the creation of Airbus Defence and Space in 2014 and also became a member of the Airbus Defence and Space Executive Committee.
