= Lunar Infrastructure for Exploration =

- Organization: EADS Astrium Space Transportation
- Location: The far side of the Moon

The Lunar Infrastructure for Exploration (LIFE) was a proposed project to build a space telescope on the far side of the Moon, actively promoted by EADS Astrium Space Transportation of Germany and the Netherlands Foundation for Research in Astronomy ASTRON/LOFAR. The project was presented for the first time publicly at the 2005 IAF Congress in Fukuoka.. The project was discussed in a paper highlighted in the journal Acta Astronautica in 2008.

The 1.3 billion euro project would have involved a radio telescope to be located on the polar region of the far side of the Moon.

The radio telescope was intended to look for exoplanets and detect signals in the 1-10 MHz range. Such signals cannot be detected on Earth because of ionosphere interference.

The proposed telescope would have been constructed by a lander vehicle to deploy dipoles across a 300-400 m area. The dipoles, which receive the cosmic radio signals, would be deployed either by a dispenser or by a team of small mobile robots. The telescope would have been located near the South Pole to ensure permanent sunlight and direct communication with Earth. The proposed lander would also have had geophones, which could listen to meteorite impacts on the Moon's surface.

Another German aerospace consortium, OHB-System, also promoted a lunar lander concept called Mona Lisa. Models of both concepts were displayed at ILA in 2006.

== See also ==
- List of space telescopes
- Lunar Crater Radio Telescope
