= TerraSAR-X =

German Earth observation satellite

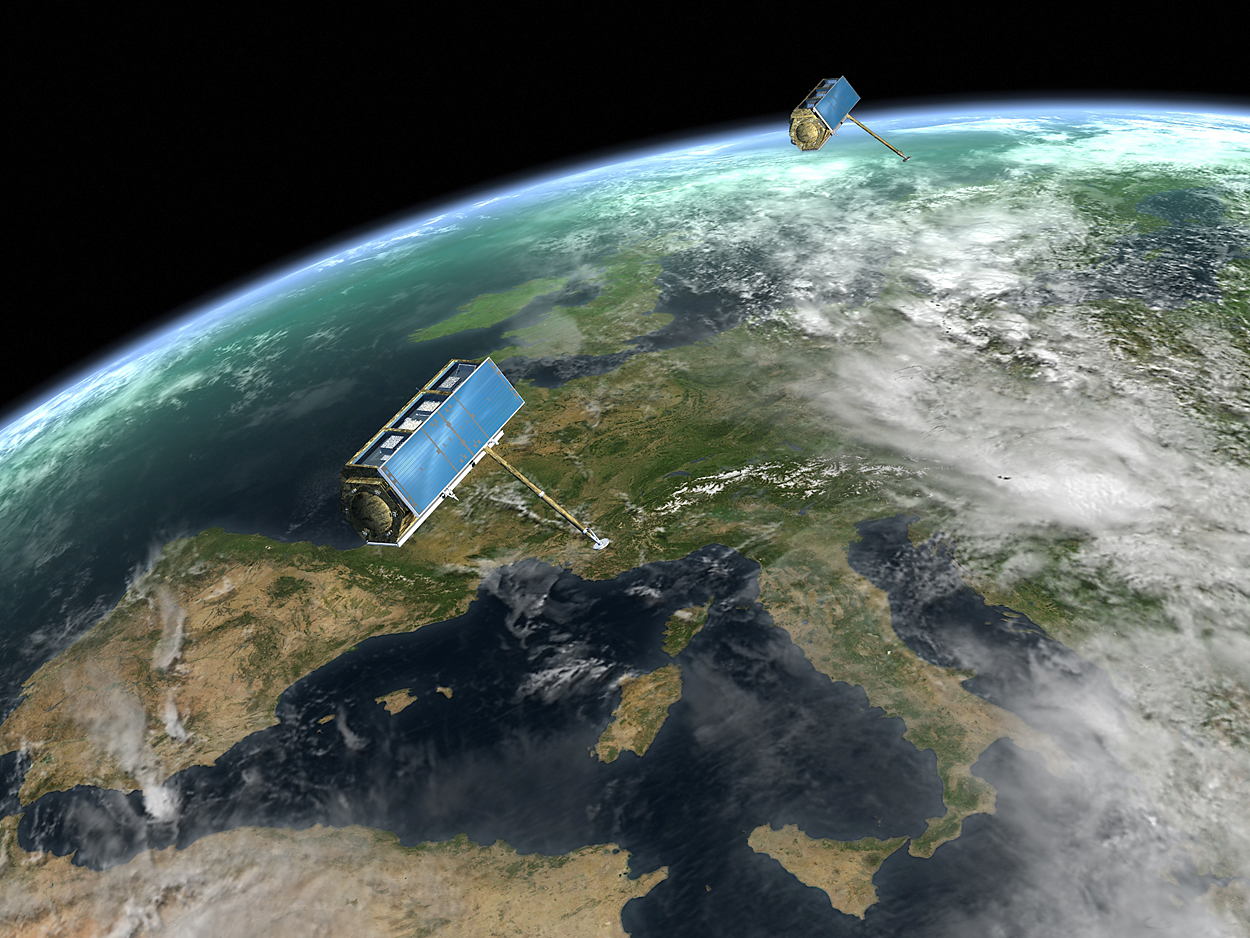
- A rendering of the satellites TerraSar-X and TanDEM-X flying over Europe
- Mission type: Radar imaging
- Operator: DLR
- COSPAR ID: 2007-026A
- SATCAT no.: 31698
- Mission duration: Elapsed: 17 years, 11 months, 20 days

Spacecraft properties
- Manufacturer: EADS Astrium
- Launch mass: 1,230 kg (2,710 lb)

Start of mission
- Launch date: 15 June 2007, 02:14 UTC
- Rocket: Dnepr
- Launch site: Baikonur 109/95
- Contractor: ISC Kosmotras

Orbital parameters
- Reference system: Geocentric
- Regime: Low Earth
- Semi-major axis: 6,886.39 kilometres (4,279.00 mi)
- Eccentricity: 0.0001445
- Perigee altitude: 514 kilometres (319 mi)
- Apogee altitude: 516 kilometres (321 mi)
- Inclination: 97.44 degrees
- Period: 94.79 minutes
- Epoch: 25 January 2015, 02:35:23 UTC

TerraSAR-X is an imaging radar Earth observation satellite, a joint venture being carried out under a public-private-partnership between the German Aerospace Center (DLR) and EADS Astrium. The exclusive commercial exploitation rights are held by the geo-information service provider Astrium. TerraSAR-X was launched on 15 June 2007 and has been in operational service since January 2008. With its twin satellite TanDEM-X, launched 21 June 2010, TerraSAR-X acquires the data basis for the WorldDEM, the worldwide and homogeneous DEM available from 2014.

== Satellite and mission ==
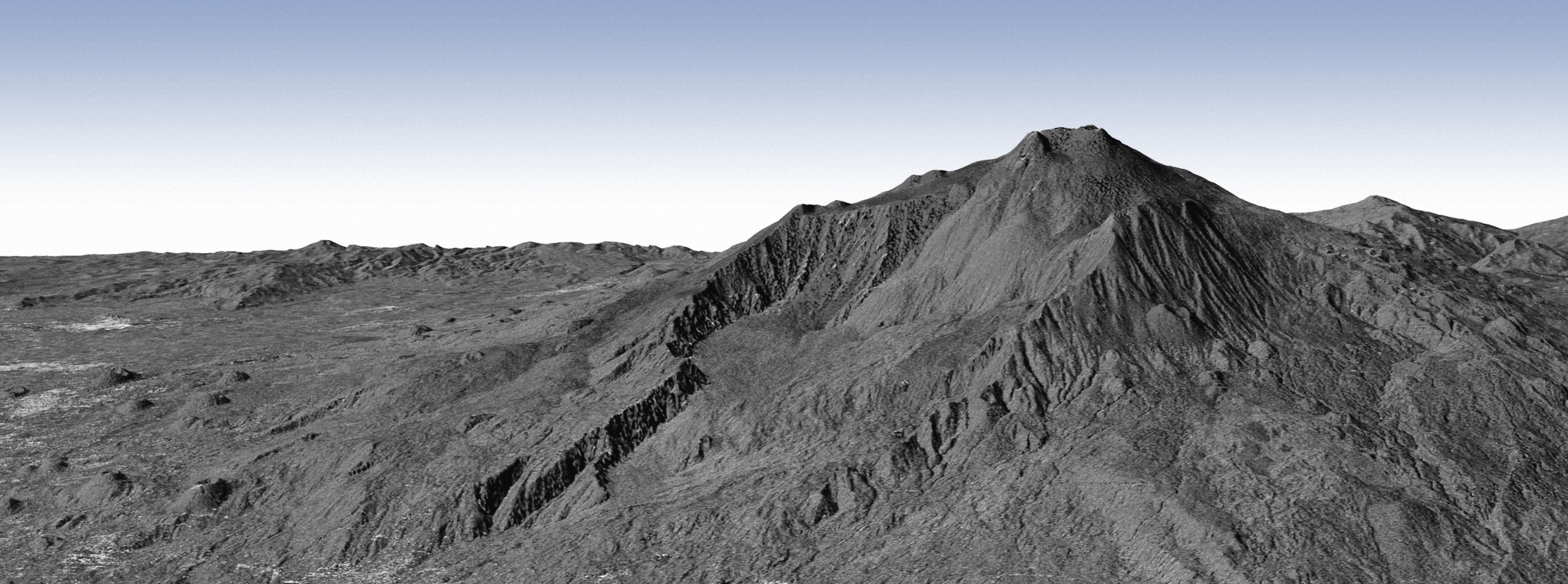
Radar image

Using a phased array synthetic aperture radar (SAR) antenna (X-band wavelength 31mm, frequency 9.65 GHz), TerraSAR-X provides radar images of the entire planet from an Earth polar orbit of 514km altitude. This is selected so that the satellite follows a Sun-synchronous orbit. This specific orbit means that the satellite moves along the day–night boundary of the Earth and allows it to present the same face to the Sun, thus providing the best solar incidence angles to its solar cells for power. TerraSAR-X was designed to carry out its task for five years, independent of weather conditions and illumination, and provides radar images with a resolution of up to 1 m.

== TerraSAR-X imaging modes ==
TerraSAR-X acquires radar data in the following three main imaging modes:

- SpotLight: up to 1 m resolution, scene size 10 km (width) × 5 km (length);
- StripMap: up to 3 m resolution, scene size 30 km (width) × 50 km (length);
- ScanSAR: up to 16 m resolution, scene size 100 km (width) × 150 km (length);

In addition, the design of TerraSAR-X's SAR antenna allows a variety of polarimetric combinations: single or dual polarization, or full polarimetric data takes.

Depending on the desired application, one of four different processing levels is selected:

- Single Look Slant Range Complex (SSC)
- Multi Look Ground Range Detected (MGD)
- Geocoded Ellipsoid Corrected (GEC)
- Enhanced Ellipsoid Corrected (EEC)

== TanDEM-X and WorldDEM Akida ==
TanDEM-X (TerraSAR-X add-on for Digital Elevation Measurements) is a second, similar spacecraft launched on 21 June 2010 from Baikonur Cosmodrome in Kazakhstan. Since October 2010, TerraSAR-X and TanDEM-X have orbited in close formation at distances of a few hundred metres and record data synchronously. This twin satellite constellation will allow the generation of WorldDEM, the global digital elevation models (DEMs). With higher accuracy, coverage and quality – WorldDEM is a consistent DEM of the Earth's land surface is envisaged to be acquired and generated within three years after launch. Available from 2014, WorldDEM is to feature a vertical accuracy of 2 m (relative) and 10 m (absolute), within a horizontal raster of approximately 12×12 square meters, slightly varying depending on the geographic latitude.

== Satellite radar ==
Radar stands for Radio Detection and Ranging and traditionally contains:

- Range finding (EDM) by means of the time a reflected signal needs to return;
- Direction measurement via the adjustment of the antenna, and;
- Other analysis such as SAR, polarization and Interferometry.

Satellite radar systems came into operation over fifteen years after the adoption of optical camera systems. The resolution is lower than optical imaging, but radar can gather information at any time of the day or night and independent of cloud cover.

Early radar satellite techniques were altimetry (measuring height over sea level), NASA's SEASAT (launched in 1978), study of waves/wind or soil data. The military has used radar since the late 1930s and radar satellites at least since 1978.

== Novel design features of TerraSAR X ==
TerraSAR X introduced some technical-industrial novelties. One of these innovations is a kind of zoom shot, with the resolution and scanning field vice versa changeable in a 1:10 relationship, either a larger area to grasp or a small area with the highest possible resolution.

Furthermore, the antenna can be aligned by electronics within an angle range so that the point of view is adjustable. Earlier radar satellites could radiate the antenna only in one direction.

== Scanning and trajectory ==
With the adjustable angle radar sensor – along with other course refinements (precession by the earth flattening) – any place on earth can be observed preferentially within 1 to 3 days.

For a specific point on the Earth's equator, TerraSAR X has a revisit cycle of 11 days. The revisit time decreases towards the poles, e.g. Northern Europe has a revisit time of typically 3–4 days.

== Ground segment ==
The ground operating mechanism and controls for the TerraSAR X is developed by the DLR in Oberpfaffenhofen. It consists of Mission Operating Equipment, the Payload ground segment and the Instrument Operation and Calibration Segment. At the base of the ground segment lies the German Space Operation Center (GSOC), the German Remote Sensing Datum Center (DFD) as well as Institutes for Methodology of Remote Sensing (MF) and the Institute for High-Frequency Engineering and Radar Systems (HR) which are all part of the DLR.

== Applications ==
Applications of the high-resolution TerraSAR-X radar imagery include:

- Topographic mapping: 2D and 3D, in scales down to 1:25,000, map updates
- Surface movement: Based on time series acquired by TerraSAR-X over the same area surface displacements caused by subsurface mining, oil-/gas extraction, infrastructure construction, excavations, or underground engineering can be visualised.
- Change detection: for the monitoring of large-scale construction projects, infrastructure networks, monitoring and documentation of changes and developments
- Land cover and land use mapping: accurate and up-to-date land cover / land use informations, also from places, where it is difficult to get informations with using other technologies because of permanent cloud cover
- Defence and security applications: Applications include effective mission planning, the quick assessment of natural or manmade disasters or border control through detection of paths (changes), fences and moving objects
- Rapid emergency response: due to its rapid revisit time TerraSAR-X is a reliable source of information in case of natural or man-made disasters (e.g. earthquakes, floods, military conflicts etc.) providing reliable information for disaster management and response allowing the recognition and assessment of damages to populated areas and traffic infrastructure, the identification of focus areas, and an efficient coordination of rescue actions.
- Environmental applications: e.g. forest monitoring, flood monitoring, water quality applications
- Further applications currently under evaluation: traffic monitoring, maritime applications, vegetation monitoring

== Scientific use of TerraSAR-X data ==
The scientific use of the TerraSAR-X data will be coordinated through the TerraSAR-X Science Service System by the DLR. The new-quality data records, as provided by TerraSAR-X, will offer a vast amount of new research incentives, for instance in ecology, geology, hydrology and oceanography. The smallest movements of the Earth's surface (plate tectonics, volcanism, earthquake) are further scientific fields of application.

== Commercial use of TerraSAR-X data ==
To ensure the commercial success of the mission, EADS Astrium founded its 100% subsidiary Infoterra in 2001; the company being responsible for establishing a commercial market for TerraSAR-X data as well as TerraSAR-X-based geo-information products and services.

== See also ==
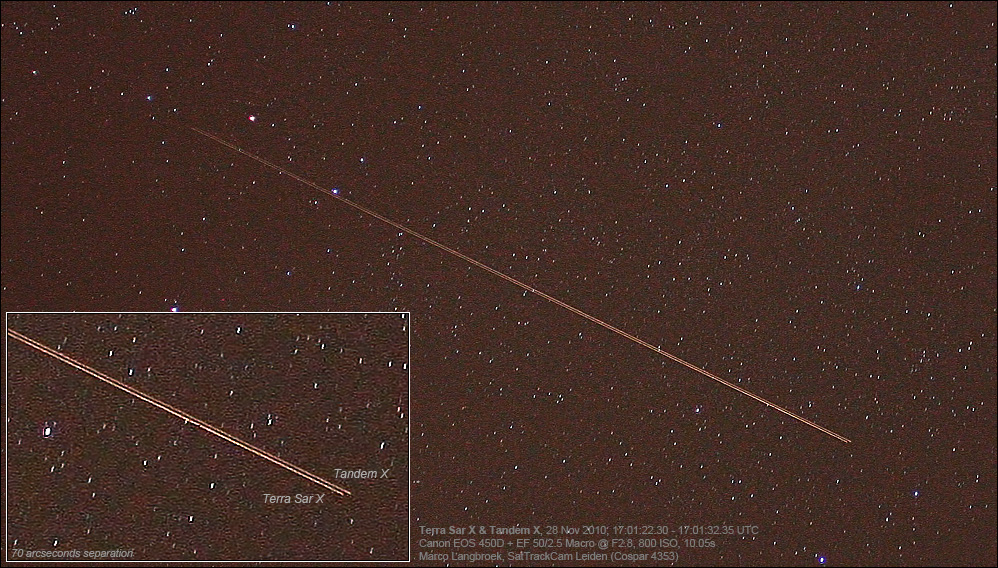
The radar remote sensing satellites TanDEM X and Terra SAR X photographed while flying in close formation (photo by Marco Langbroek, Leiden, the Netherlands). Movement is from lower right to upper left in this 10-second exposure.

- OPS 3762: The very first SAR radar in space, 1964
- Seasat: The SAR radar in space in 1978
- SAR Lupe: Germany's military radar satellites
- Synthetic Aperture Radar
- Earth observation technology
- Earth observation satellite
- Digital elevation model

Radars on the Space Shuttle:

- SIR-A (Shuttle Imaging Radar) aboard STS-2 in 1981
- SIR-B aboard STS-41-G in 1984
- SRL-1 (Shuttle Radar Laboratory): SIR-C (Spaceborne Imaging Radar) and X-SAR (X-Band Synthetic Aperture Radar) on STS-59 in 1994
- SRL-2: SIR-C/X-SAR on STS-68 in 1994
- SRTM (Shuttle Radar Topography Mission) on STS-99 in 2000

(the TerraSAR-X authors were involved in SRL and SRTM missions)
