= Walter Klingenbeck =

German mechanic, resistance fighter and martyr

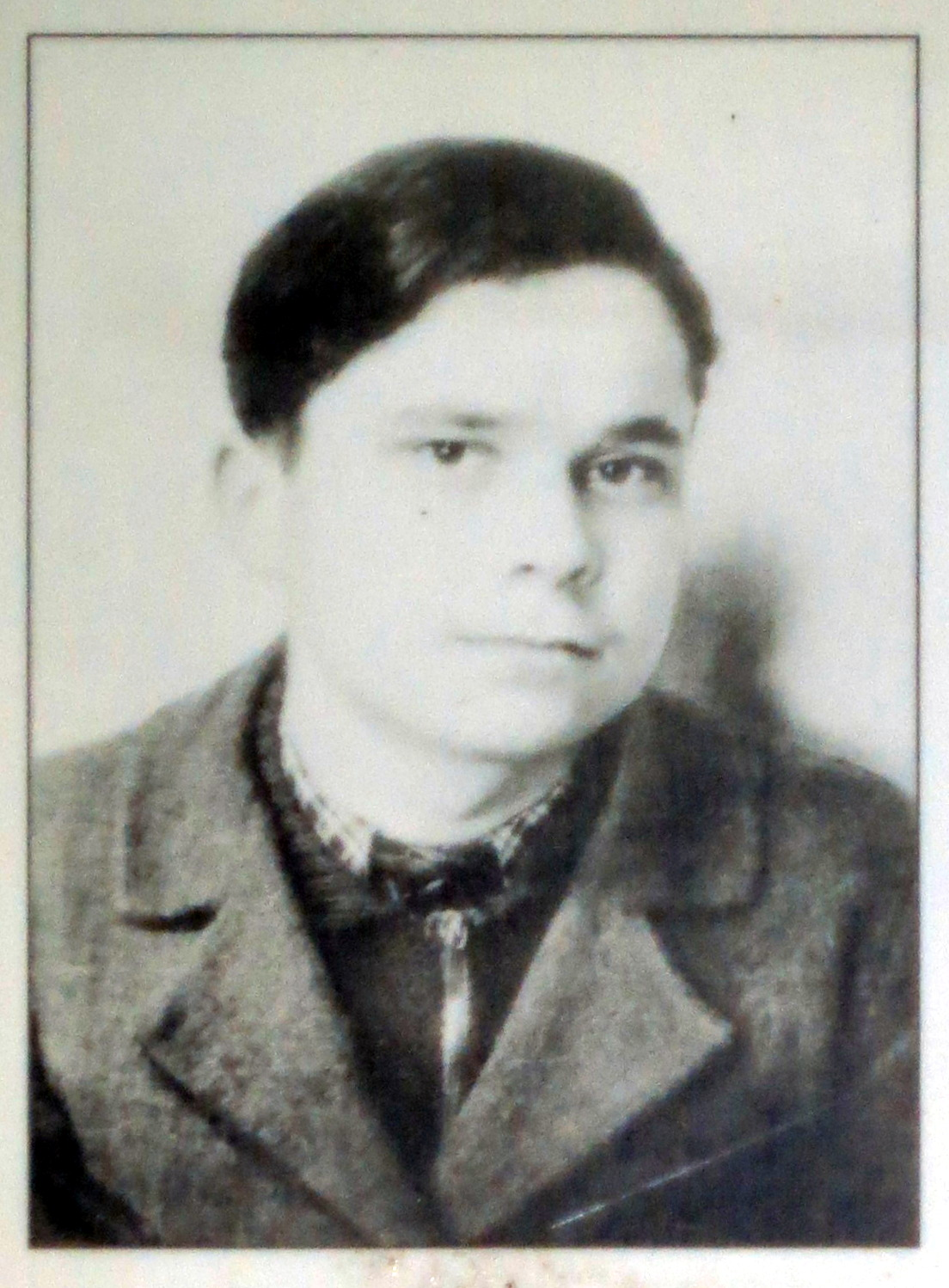
Walter Klingenbeck

Walter Klingenbeck (30 March 1924, in Munich – 5 August 1943, in Munich-Stadelheim) was a German resistance fighter in the time of the Third Reich. He came from a Catholic family, and was a member of the St. Ludwig Catholic Youth Troop until it was banned and dissolved by the Nazi regime. This experience laid the groundwork for his critical stance towards the regime, which was further strengthened when the young radio enthusiast listened to German-language broadcasts from the BBC, Radio Vatican, and other forbidden broadcasting stations.

Early in 1941, a number of young people with similar political and religious views formed a group under Klingenbeck's leadership. They planned to spread leaflets and built a radio transmitter through which they broadcast opposition propaganda, and called for the overthrow of the Nazi regime. In the summer of 1941, an appeal came over the BBC to spread the "V-for-Victory" sign to herald the foreseen Allied victory in the Second World War, whereupon Klingenbeck painted the sign on some forty buildings in Munich with gloss paint.

Klingenbeck told of this exploit, which led to his denunciation and arrest on 26 January 1942. On 24 September 1942, he was sentenced to death by the Volksgerichtshof, and on 5 August 1943, he was put to death at Stadelheim Prison, aged 19. Two of his friends, Hans Haberl and Daniel von Recklinghausen, were at first also condemned, but on 2 August 1943, their sentences were commuted to eight years at hard labour in a Zuchthaus.

In January 1998, a formerly unnamed lane in Maxvorstadt, a neighbourhood in the center of Munich, was named for Klingenbeck. A Realschule in Taufkirchen is also named after him.
