= Taufkirchen, Munich =

Taufkirchen
- Municipality
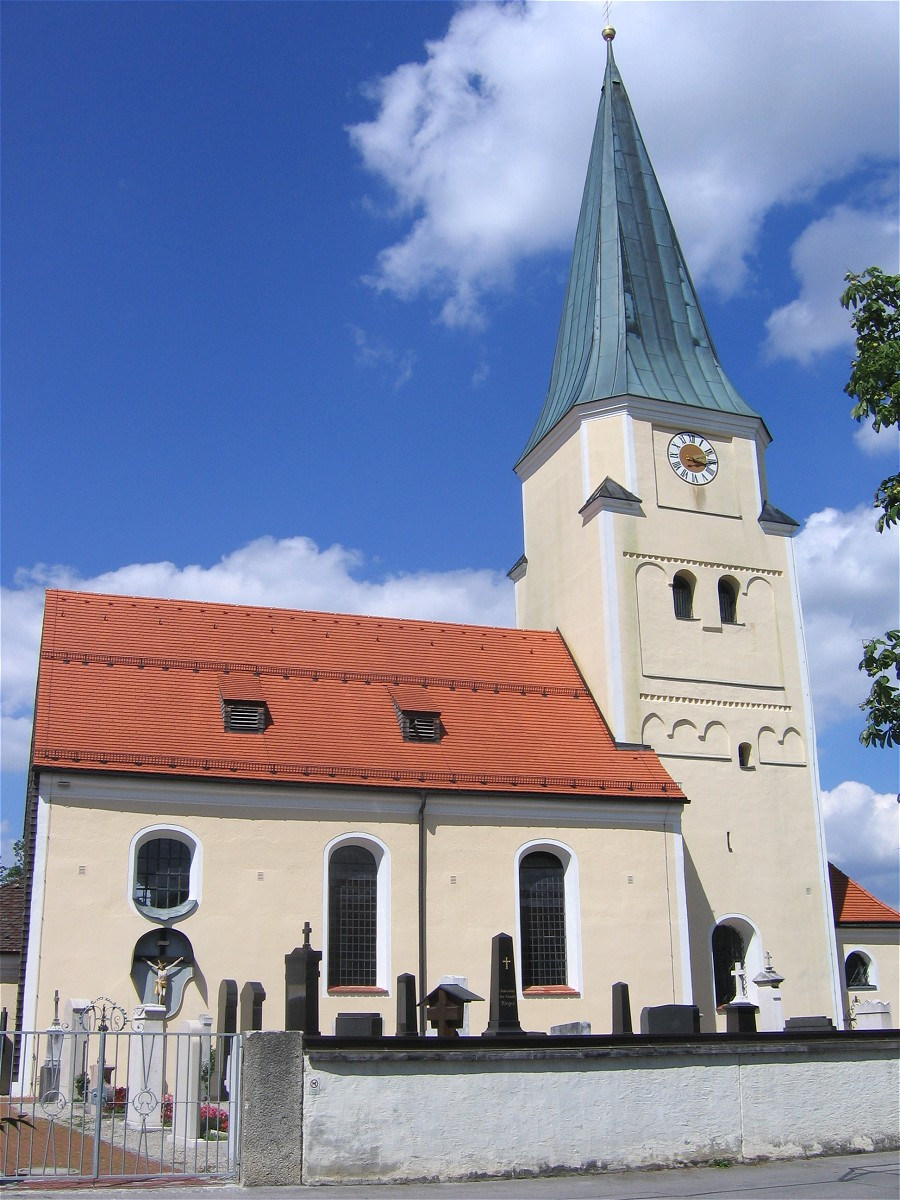
- Church of Saint John the Baptist

- Coat of arms

- Location of Taufkirchen within Munich district
- Interactive map of Taufkirchen
- Location within Germany Location within Bavaria
- Coordinates: 48°3′N 11°37′E
- Country: Germany
- State: Bavaria
- Admin. region: Oberbayern
- District: Munich

Government
  - Mayor (2026–): Sebastian Thoma (CSU)

Area
  - Total: 22 km^{2} (8.5 sq mi)
- Elevation: 563 m (1,847 ft)

Population (2025-12-31)
  - Total: 18,130
  - Density: 820/km^{2} (2,100/sq mi)
- Time zone: UTC+01:00 (CET)
  - Summer (DST): UTC+02:00 (CEST)
- Postal codes: 82024
- Dialling codes: 089
- Vehicle registration: M
- Website: www.meintaufkirchen.de

Taufkirchen (German pronunciation: [taʊfˈkɪʁçn̩]) is a suburban municipality south of Munich, near Oberhaching and Unterhaching in Bavaria, southern Germany.

The Realschule is named after Walter Klingenbeck. The headquarters of Airbus Defence and Space is generally considered to be in the neighbouring community Ottobrunn, but most of the ground area belongs to Taufkirchen.

== Twin towns ==
- Meulan in France
- Wildau in Germany
