= Infoterra Ltd =

Infoterra is a provider of geospatial products and services. They support applications such as flood risk analysis, network planning, humanitarian relief and geological mapping.

One of Infoterra's main areas of expertise is data acquisition and processing. One of its projects is processing data for ESA's ERS-1, ERS-2 and Envisat satellites using recent and historical data.

It was launched in January 2001 and is a wholly owned subsidiary of EADS Astrium.

It has offices in Leicester, Farnborough and Newcastle upon Tyne in the UK, Toulouse in France, Friedrichshafen in Germany, Barcelona and Madrid in Spain, Budapest in Hungary and an office in China.

It has recently merged with SPOT-image in France and EADS Astrium and they are now known as Astrium Services’ GEO-Information Division.

== See also ==
- EADS Astrium
