= CRISA =

Spanish aerospace electronics and software company

Computadores, Redes e Ingeniería, SAU (CRISA) is a Spanish company founded in 1985 to develop and manufacture electronics and software products for aerospace applications.

In 2000, CRISA became part of the Airbus group.

CRISA is based north of Madrid and, in 2023, had employed around 525 people.
