= MBDA Enforcer =

ENFORCER
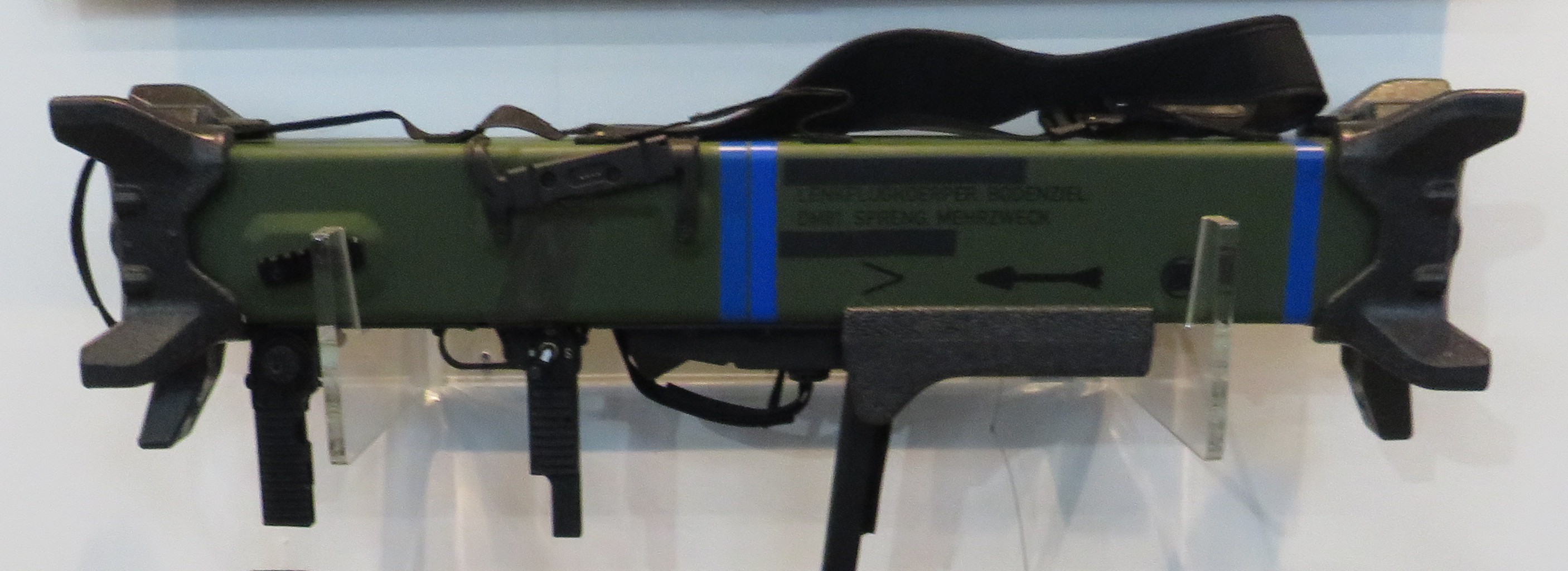
- Type: Light portable anti-armour missile
- Place of origin: Germany

Service history
- In service: From late 2024
- Used by: See operators

Production history
- Designer: MBDA Deutschland GmbH (design lead); MBDA France; MBDA UK; MBDA Italy
- Designed: 2010 – 2023
- Manufacturer: MBDA Deutschland GmbH
- Produced: Since 2023 (serial production)

Specifications
- Mass: 7 kg (15 lb) (missile), < 12 kg (26 lb) (Dynahawk sight, missile and tube)
- Length: 1 m (3.3 ft)
- Width: 110 mm (4.3 in) (tube)
- Height: 110 mm (4.3 in) (tube)
- Diameter: 90 mm (3.5 in) (missile)
- Effective firing range: 2 km (1.2 mi)
- Warhead: EFP, Multi-effect warhead with multimode fuse, airbust capable
- Guidance system: Infrared homing and television guidance
- Launch platform: Man-portable launcher; Vehicle-launched planned; Aircraft-launch planned

The Enforcer from the European manufacturer MBDA Deutschland is a modern infantry weapon for use against lightly armoured and unarmoured vehicles and stationary targets at a distance over 2,000 m (2,200 yd). It is a fire-and-forget weapon with a lock on before launch function and the possibility of night battle.

New variants of the missile are being developed as of 2024.

== Origins ==
In 2010, MBDA launched a new serie of programmes named Concept Visions intending to develop a wide range of future missiles. The first programme of the Concept Visions was named Infantry Weapon System Concept (IWSC), or CVS101, which became later on the Enforcer missile. This programme was first presented by MBDA in 2010 at the Farnborough International Airshow.

The intention with the IWSC was to develop the next-generation support weapons for dismounted soldiers. The main goal was to develop a light weapon able to precisely treat targets in complex and urban environments, with a high range while limiting the collateral damages. MBDA considered that the existing weapons were either too heavy, had too much power (NLAW, Spike, MILAN, Javelin), or lacked precision and range (M72 LAW, RGW 90). Two missiles were planned at that time, the Sniper and the Enforcer.

=== Infantry Weapon System Concept missiles ===
The specifications planned for with the Combat Vision programme are the following (with the expected specifications back then):

Parameters	Sniper Missiles for soft targets	Enforcer Missile for anti-armoured vehicles, bunkers and buildings
	Missile characteristics	
Mass	0.9 kg (2.0 lb)	4.5 kg (9.9 lb)
Length	380 mm (15 in)	680 mm (27 in)
Diameter	40 mm (1.6 in)	80 mm (3.1 in)
Warhead	200 gr (0.46 oz)	1.0 kg (2.2 lb) (multi-effect warhead)
	Performances	
Minimum firing range	30 m (33 yd)	–
Direct-attack range	1,500 m (1,600 yd)	2,500 m (2,700 yd)
Ballistic range	–	5,500 m (6,000 yd)
	Expected launchers	
Shoulder launcher	2.0 kg (4.4 lb)	3.0 kg (6.6 lb)
Other launchers	attached to an assault rifle	military base protection modules
Other launchers	mounted on a vehicle	
	Expected technologies	
Targeting	–	Geo-located targets without GPS
Targeting	–	NLOS target engagement (none line of sight)
Targeting	–	Re-targeting capability
Trajectories	–	Steep ballistic (optimised for urban or woodland operations)

=== Developed missile ===
Only the Enforcer missile ended up being developed by MBDA Deutschland, and its specifications were adapted. From the Enforcer missile, other variants are being developed as of 2024.

== Programme history ==
The development of the missile and the launcher was launched in July 2011, and was fully self-financed by the MBDA group. MBDA Deutschland was designated as the leader for the programme, and the MBDA France, MBDA UK and MBDA Italy participated in the development with their respective competences.

At the beginning of its development, the goals set for the missile were the following:

- Precise, cost-effective and lightweight 6.5 kg (14 lb) with a range of around 2 km (1.2 mi)
- Usable, transportable and quick to deploy by a single dismounted soldier (infantry and special forces)
- Programmable warhead, making it effective against moving targets (lightly armoured vehicles), static targets (snipers, infantry) and targets behind cover
- Capable to be fired from enclosed spaces, to fire-and-forget, and to be effective day and night in all weather conditions
- Fire-control system compatible with one of the RGW 90 already used by the KSK (FCS Hensoldt FLV5.5×30 Dynahawk)

In order to reduce the risk and to provide a cost-effective solutions, known technologies and components were planned to be reused for the Enforcer missiles.

=== Technology demonstration phase ===
In 2012 and 2013, demonstrators were tested in cooperation with the Military Technical Office for Weapons and Ammunition (WTD 91) in Meppen. MBDA took a cautious approach with a de-risking strategy by testing the parts at each step of their development to ensure that they were effective, and then combined those.

In 2012 and 2013, the first prototypes of the missile body were produced and six successful flight tests took place.

1. On 19 September 2012, the first test took place to verify the ballistic behaviour of the missile.
2. On 12 April 2013, a firing test was performed to test the servomotors and steering of the missile.
3. At the end of June 2013, a missile was fired to test its capacity to guide itself towards the target.
4. On 19 October 2013, another missile was fired to test its capacity to guide itself towards the target.
5. At the end of October 2013, a first missile was fired with a warhead.The warhead was developed by TDW, a subsidiary of MBDA Deutschland.
6. On 26 / 27 November 2013, a missile was fired with a warhead and reached its target, hitting it at few centimetres from the center.

=== Development and prototyping phase ===
Based on the success of the demonstration phase, MBDA launched the development of the prototype.

In December 2016, MBDA shared updates on the trial of the Enforcer, and they announced having hit accurately targets multiple times. The trials took place at the WTD 91 test center in November 2016. The static targets were aimed at from a distance ranging from 1,000 to 2,000 m (1,100 to 2,200 yd).

In November 2017, MBDA announced having performed successful trials against moving targets.

=== New variants ===
Since 19, new variants of the missile have been offered to the market. The detail of the variants is mentioned at the following section.

=== Pilot production ===
In 2023, the MBDA Deutschland facility in Schrobenhausen launched the production of a pilot batch. From this batch trials of the missile took place, especially environmental testing to ensure that the missile in its production phase will be able to perform in the condition pre-defined. This includes testing at certain temperature ranges, varying levels of vibrations, humidity.

As part of that phase, the EMC Laboratory (EMV Labor) of MBDA Deutschland performs electromagnetic compatibility tests. The aim is to verify if the electronic components work properly. This preventive testing verifies the insensitivity to electromagnetic interference and the reliable operation in the electromagnetic environment.

=== Serial production ===
After the pilot batch, the assembly line was made ready. After assessment of the initial production, the German Armed Forces approved the launch of the large scale serial production at the end of 2023. The parts are being supplied by other MBDA subsidiaries around Europe.

In March 2024, the Enforcer Production Increase Campaign (EPIC) was put forward to the European Commission. The commission launched a funding support for the Act in Support of Ammunition Production (ASAP) programme. The aid for the Enforcer programme reaches €10 million, and will be supplied to MBDA Deutschland and two of its subsidiaries, Bayern-Chemie Deutschland, and TDW Deutschland.

Eventually, the goal is to reach a four-digit yearly production capacity.

== Variants ==
=== Variants in production ===
==== Enforcer base variant ====
The base variant programme was launched in July 2011, the production started in 2023, and it is planned to enter service in the German Army in 2024. This missile is a shoulder launched anti-armour missile.

MBDA developed a launcher concept for the Enforcer missile. This launcher is designed to be mounted on light vehicles, likely for special forces missions. It is equipped with 2 missiles and passive sensors. The launcher concept was presented at Enforce TAC 2022, on an ENOK vehicle designed by ACS, based on the G464 G-Class.

=== Variants in development ===
MBDA Deutschland is developing several variants of the Enforcer designed for land, air, sea and anti-air applications, but those systems plan to adapt on the existing variants in order to limit the development cost and to reach a cost-effective family solution.

==== Enforcer Air ====
MBDA Deutschland unveiled a concept of an air-launched variant of the Enforcer missile in November 2019 at the Berlin Security Conference. This would be used in a similar way as the MBDA Brimstone missile, but smaller and cheaper.

As of 2019, MBDA announced that MBDA was waiting for a launch customer to integrate the Enforcer Air missile to the intended platform. Depending on the platform, the launch system can be drop-launched, tube-launched and rail launched. The potential applications for this missile are:

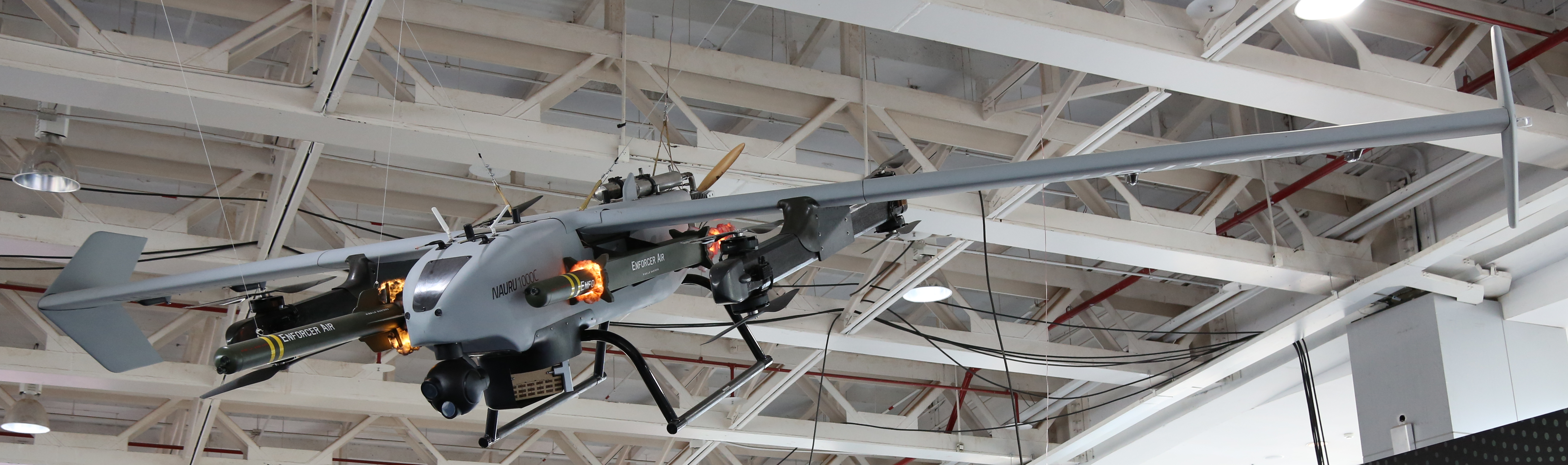
Enforcer Air on a Nauru 1000C

- Helicopter
- Medium altitude long endurance UAV (MALE UAV)
- Light unmanned aerial vehicles

A variant of its potential use on a UAV was presented by XMobots, a Brazilian UAS company at the LAAD exhibition in April 2023 in Rio de Janeiro. The drone shown with the missile is the Nauru 1000C.

As of November 2023, MBDA mentions having already performed flight trials of this variant.

==== Enforcer X ====
The Enforcer X is a dedicated anti-tank variant of the Enforcer platform. As of March 2023 at SOFINS 2023, MBDA announced that this variant is under development. It is designed to be a shoulder fired ATGM.

The warhead will be supplied by TDW. It will feature a tandem shaped charge designed to penetrate the tank armour behind explosive reactive armour. And it will have two attack modes, a direct attack capability, and top attack. The range is expected to remain at 2 km (1.2 mi) just like the base variants of the Enforcer.

==== DefendAir ====
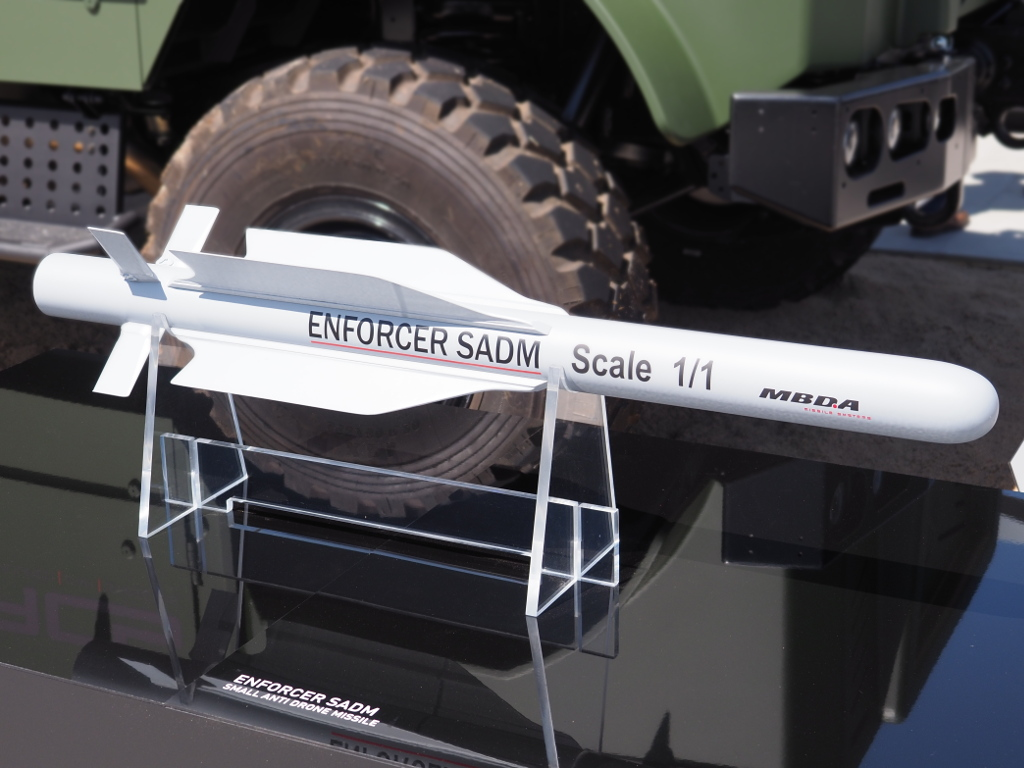
MBDA Enforcer SADM

A short range anti-air variant of the Enforcer missile initially known as the SADM (Small Anti Drone Missile) was renamed as DefendAir in June 2025. Its main design feature is to combat drones, but could also be used against light aerial targets. A first concept of what that system could be was presented at the ILA Berlin Air Show 2022. With this missiles, MBDA says that it plans to combat Class 1 UAS, UAV under 150 kg (330 lb).

The main differences to the base variant of the Enforcer are:

- a special seeker head for air targets
- a booster attached to the base Enforcer missile to extend its range

The proposed applications for the missile as of 2024 are:

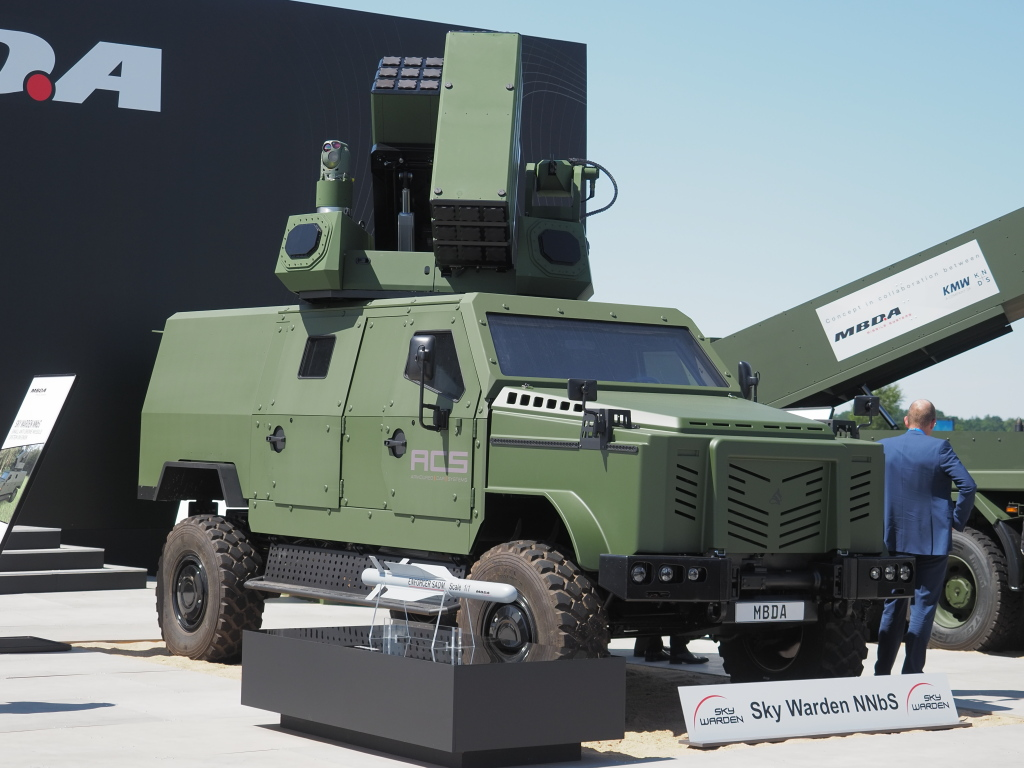
MBDA Sky Warden

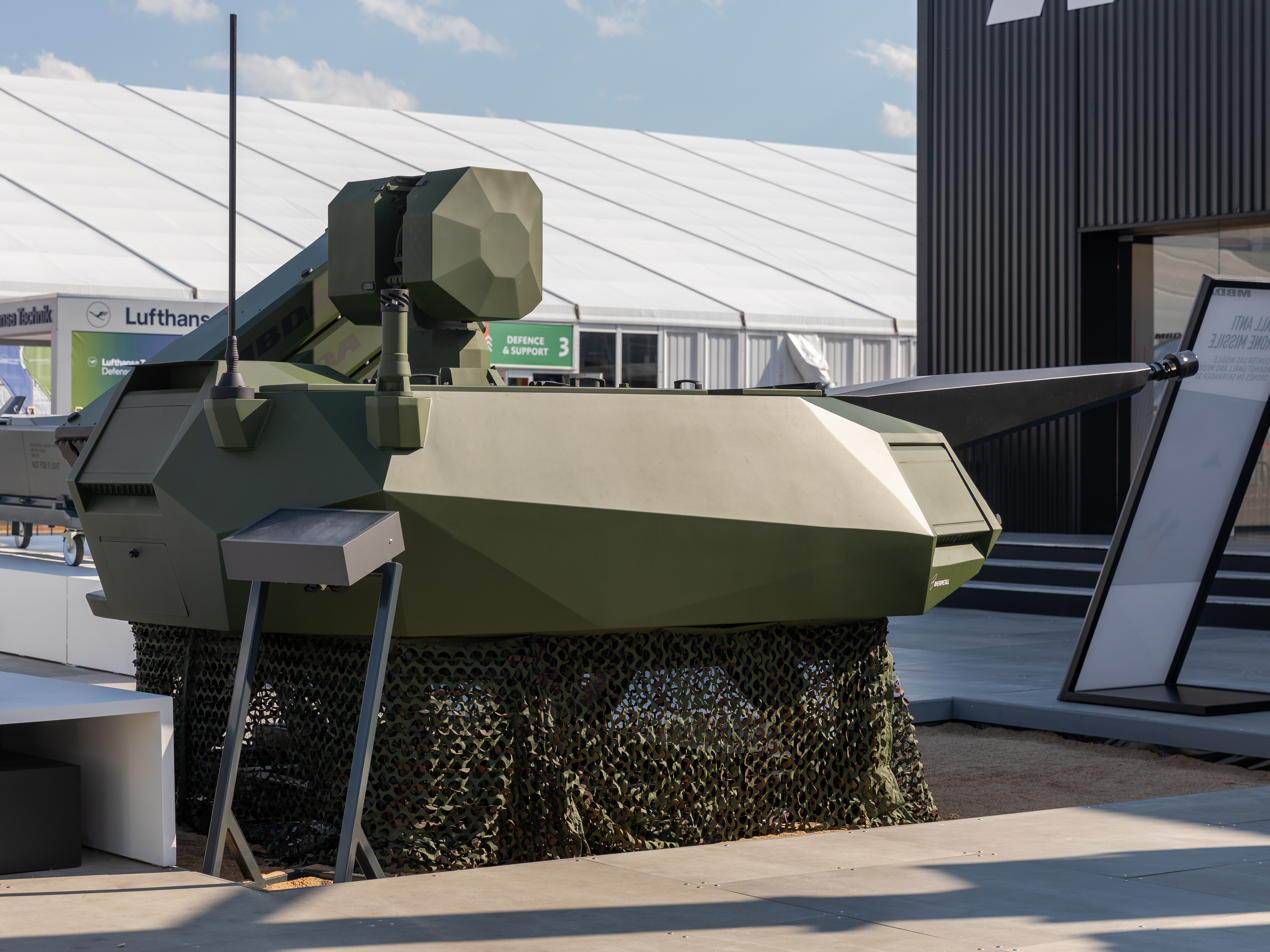
Enforcer SADM on Skyranger 30

- MBDA Sky Warden NNbS:
  In June 2022, at the ILA Berlin Air Show, MBDA presented the Sky Warden system concept. It is designed to combat UAV. The base vehicle is the ACS ENOK 9.5 APV based on the Unimog U1500 chassis. The vehicle is equipped with a turret which features 18 Enforcer SADM missiles (two launchers with 9 missiles) and a general purpose machine gun as well as passive and active sensors to detect the threat.
- Skyranger 30:
  In June 2024, at the ILA Berlin Air Show, Rheinmetall Air Defence (former Oerlikon) and MBDA signed a letter of intent to integrate the SADM to the Skyranger 30 SPAAG (self-propelled anti-gun). The Skyranger 30 is equipped with a Oerlikon KCA autocanon firing a 30 × 173 mm variant of the AHEAD ammunition. It can be topped with a SHORAD missile system and a laser anti-drone system. For the missile system, several options have been mentioned, and one of them is the SADM. In this variant, a launcher in a 3×3 configuration was developed and is being offered to the clients of the system. According to MBDA and Rheinmetall, additional layers of 3 could be added to the launcher if needed. With the SADM on the Skyranger 30, the desire of the German Army is to use the missile beyond the range of the canon at 2 km (1.2 mi), and up to 5 to 6 km (3.1 to 3.7 mi).

The SADM was selected by the German Army in May 2025.

The budget for the development and the production of the first DefendAir missiles was approved in November 2025 (€490 million).

== Missile design ==
=== Characteristics of the missile variants ===
Parameters	Enforcer	Enforcer X	Enforcer Air	Enforcer SADM
	Role of the missile			
Role	Light anti-armour guided missile	Anti-tank guided missile	Air-to-ground anti-armour missile	C-UAS anti-air missile
	Missile characteristics			
Diameter	90 mm (3.5 in)	90 mm (3.5 in)	–	–
Length	< 1.0 m (39 in)	< 1.0 m (39 in)	–	–
Mass missile	< 7.0 kg (15.4 lb)	–	–	–
Mass missile with tube	< 9.0 kg (19.8 lb)	10.0 kg (22.0 lb)	–	–
Mass with sight	< 12.0 kg (26.5 lb)	13.0 kg (28.7 lb)	–	–
Temperature range	−46 to +71 °C (−51 to 160 °F)			
	Performances			
Minimum firing distance	100 m (110 yd)	–	–	–
Maximum range	> 2.0 km (1.2 mi)	> 2.0 km (1.2 mi)	–	5.0 to 6.0 km (3.1 to 3.7 mi)
	Seeker			
Seeker type	IR and camera to be selected prior to launch	IR and camera to be selected prior to launch	IR and camera to be selected prior to launch	Adapted seeker
	Missile launch			
Launch	LOBL (lock-on before launch) / Launch from enclosed space	LOBL (lock-on before launch)	–	–
Launcher types	Shoulder-fire tube	Shoulder-fire tube	Drop-launched / tube-launched / rail launched	9×9 launcher on vehicle
Fire control system	Hensoldt Dynahawk / Aimpoint FCS 14	Hensoldt Dynahawk / Aimpoint FCS 14	–	–
	Warhead			
Warhead type	Multi-effect EFP (explosively-formed penetrator)	Tandem shaped charge	Multi-effect EFP (explosively-formed penetrator)	Adapted EFP with more fragments
Warhead mass	–	–	–	–
Fuse	Multi-mode fuse (point detonation, impact-delayed or air-burst)	Direct impact only	Multi-mode fuse (point detonation, impact-delayed or air-burst)	–

=== MBDA Enforcer (base variant) ===
==== Missile use ====
The Enforcer system can be divided in three main parts, the missile itself, and all its components the launching tube and the fire control sight.

The Enforcer missile is a fire-and-forget system, with lock-on before launch capability and it can be launched from an enclosed space.

For the operator, he is transporting a fire control sight and one or more missiles in their launching tube. In order to use the missile, the operator connects the sight to the missile, a mechanical and an electronic connection is made. The operator looks at the target through the sight, uses the laser range finder. Depending on the weather conditions which affect the propellant, the distance and the altitude difference, the missile determines if the target can be reached. The operator selects the sensor to be used by the missile (day or night), informs the missile if the target is in movement, and selects the effect of the missile. Once locked on the target, the operator can squeeze the trigger.

==== Missile structure ====
According to the information supplied by MBDA Deutschland, the base structure of the missile is as following (front to back):

1. Dual-use seeker (IR and TV):
2. Calculator
3. Warhead
4. Power supply (battery)
5. Propulsion and guidance

Details about each part of the missile design and production are given in the next subsections.

===== Seeker =====
There are two sensors available, an infrared sensor (used at night, and in some weather / smoke conditions) and a day sensor which is a camera. The operator acquires the target with the fire control system, and when the missile is launched, the missile the system correlates the contrast of the image acquired to what it sees at a rate of 25 frames per second. The tracker can therefore guide the missile towards the target even if the light conditions change, or if the target moves up to 50 km/h (31 mph).

===== Calculator =====
Behind the seeker, there is the weapon calculator. The calculator has several roles, among which, it communicates with the fire-control system prior to launch, it registers the information about the target and its distance, it defines and corrects the flight path towards the target, and it performs the attack according to the mode selected by the operator.

===== Warhead =====
TDW GmbH, a subsidiary of MBDA Deutschland, is the designer and supplier of the warhead, its safety, and its arming unit.

The main features of the warhead is its multi-effect capability, with multi-mode fuse. The warhead is made of a forward-facing EFP (explosively formed penetrator) to treat light armoured vehicles, and a radial array of preformed fragments enabling to treat an area from dismounted soldiers.

The fuse modes available that the shooters selects prior to the launch depending on the target and the desired effect are:

- Point detonation: The missile explodes when entering in contact with the target, for the Enforcer missile, it will be a vehicle (lightly armoured or unarmoured).
- Impact-delayed: This mode is used to hit an enemy that might be inside of a building, so the explosion takes place inside.
- Air-burst: The distance to the target is defined by the laser range-finder, and the explosion is timed to hit a zone with the targeted soldiers, or to hit soldiers behind cover.

One major safety aspect of the warhead design is that the explosive is insensitive. If the missile is caught in a fire or shot at, it will not detonate. This is thanks to the chemical composition of the explosive. The explosive mixture is prepared in a liquid form, after which it will be poured to take the desired shape within the warhead through a secret process.

===== Propulsion =====
The propulsion system is designed and produced by Bayern-Chemie, also a subsidiary of MBDA Deutschland.

The missile has two engines:

- Primary engine: It is located at the very rear part of the missile. Its sole role is to catapult the missile out of its tube. On older missiles, there would be only one engine, but here, one of the requirement is to fire the missile from an enclose space, and therefore a standard engine would be dangerous. This engine is working only few milliseconds in which all of its fuel is combusted. This engine has a smaller diameter than the missile, as the exhaust of the second engine surrounds it.
- Flight engine: This engine is located in the penultimate position. The exhausts of this engine surround the exhaust of the primary engine. This engine will start once it's far enough from the launcher, and takes over the propulsion towards the target.

The propellants used for the missile are insensitive, they will not explode or cook-off if a fire, an explosion or a projectile hit it. The propellant in use is a double-base fuel, and needs to operate in a temperature ranging from −46 to +71 °C (−51 to 160 °F). There is a sensor that monitors the temperature of the propellant. This sensor is one of the sensor that adapts the range capability of the missile in the existing conditions.

===== Flight and guidance surfaces =====
Four plastic wings are surrounding the missile at its center of mass.

Behind the wings, there is a rudder control system which guides the missile. The fins deploy mechanically once the missile is ejected from the tube. The actuators are located between the primary engine and the flight engine.

==== Launching tube ====
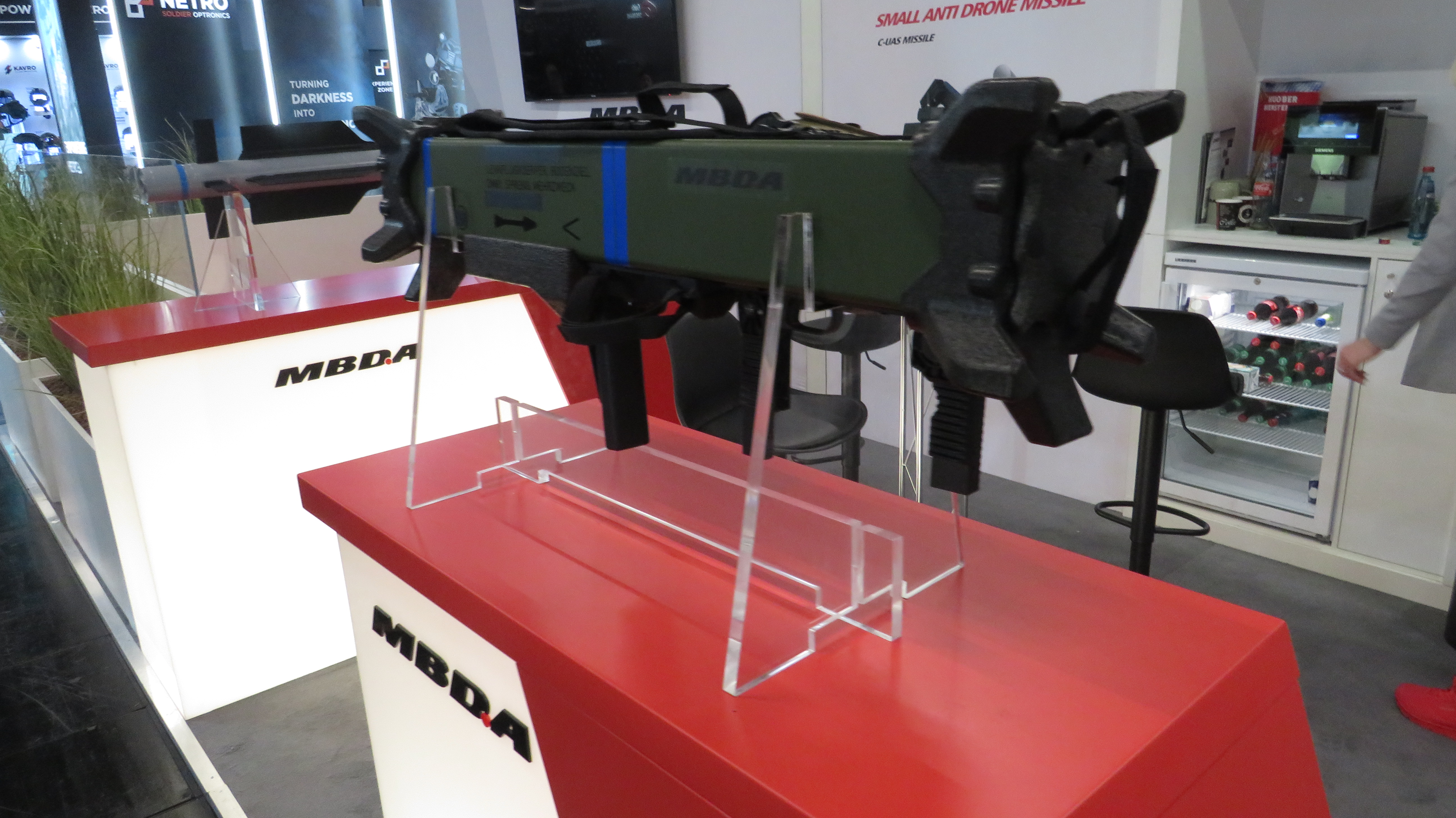
MBDA Enforcer

MBDA Italy developed the lightweight carbon-fibre launching tube for the missile. It is a single-use square shaped tube.

The trigger that gets connected to the launching tube is assembled by MBDA Deutschland. The design of the trigger ensures that the missile is not a dud in case of a malfunction of the trigger.

==== Enforcer assembly ====
The assembly takes place in Germany, and is made by MBDA Deutschland.

For the missile itself, the he seeker and the calculator are assembled together. Separately, the engine and the flight control systems and surfaces are assembled together. Once both sides are done, the warhead will be added in between. The warhead and the fuse system arrive pre-assembled,

The rear part of the assembly, the propulsion is manufactured in an aluminium casing. Once the front part is connected to the rear part and the warhead is connected, a cylindrical aluminium casing will surround the front part of the missile. And unlike traditional manufacturing methods that would screw or rivet the casing of the front to the rear, it is welded in an automatic laser welding machine, which is an innovation from MBDA.

At each step of the assembly process of the missile, measurements and tests are performed to ensure that the tolerances are respected, and that the electronic systems work as intended, and all the results are documented.

Once the missile succeeds all the required tests, it is integrated to the launching tube which integrates the trigger as well. The last step prior to the delivery of the missile is an environmental test which will put the missile in harsh environments, and all the systems are being tested to ensure the quality of the ammunition.

==== Fire control sight ====
As of 2024, two options exist for the fire control system of the Enforcer missile.

===== Hensoldt Dynahawk =====
The two first clients of the Enforcer made the decision to order this fire control sight. It has a mass of 2.2 kg (4.9 lb) for the optics only.

This Dynahawk has a 5.5 × glass optical magnification, and it has a laser range finder. It is also equipped with a ballistics computer connected to sensors for measuring temperature, air pressure, and angular rate. There are modes to engage static targets, and targets in movement. It has also the capability to recognise to which weapon system it is connected (RGW 90 or Enforcer missile). The fire control system also enables to select whether it will be used for direct attack, or air-burst mode. The air-burst mode has a very high accuracy with this system.

===== Aimpoint FCS 14 =====
An alternative to the Dynahawk is the multi-function fire control sight Fire Control Sight 14 from Aimpoint. It has a mass of 1.5 kg (3.3 lb) with its optics only, and 2.0 kg (4.4 lb) with thermal imaging.

The basic variant of the FCS 14 has an optical channel to aim at the target. The other elements include a laser rangefinder, sensors to assess the position and inclination of the weapon, a gyroscope, a GNSS receiver and a compass. It is also able to communicate with the weapon. It can access to the temperature of the propellant in order to compensate the flight trajectory, and also to use the programmable capacity of the missile (direct hit or air-burst) and the location at which it ignites. If equipped with thermal imaging, it can be used by the operator.

For the optical sensor, there is no magnification, and the field of view is 12° horizontally, and 16° vertically. The laser range finder has a range of 4.0 km (2.5 mi), and it has a wavelength of 1,550 nm meaning it is a Class 1 eye-safe laser.

This alternative to the Dynahawk should bring additional export opportunities for multiple reasons. Its lower price makes it more affordable. It is ITAR free, which means that the US can't block its export. Aimpoint is a Swedish company, and it uses European components for the system. The Aimpoint FCS 14 is also being used with shoulder fired weapons, with grenade launchers and with heavy machine guns (12.7×99 mm NATO).

==== Simulator ====
The German Army uses shooting simulators, those are known as the AGSHP ("Ausbildungsgeräte Schießsimulator Handwaffen/Panzerabwehrhandwaffen") which means "training equipment for shooting simulators for small arms/anti-tank small arms". By 2025, Thales Deutschland will modernise the 180 stationary AGSHP and the 4 mobile ones that are in service for the German Army. The Enforcer missile will be added to the system.

The software of the simulator that uses virtual reality is supplied by Hologate under the HGXR brand.

== Operators ==
=== Future operators ===
==== Enforcer - base variant ====
Germany (850 ordered + 2,237 in option)
On 20 December 2019, BAAINBw concluded a contract for the purchase of 850 units for € 76 million. The entry into service in the Bundeswehr is planned for 2024, starting with the special forces (KSK). The framework agreement signed includes an option for up to 2,237 additional missiles in total, deliveries that would be possible until 2026. The fire control sight ordered for the Enforcer is the Hensoldt Dynahawk. The German Army already uses this sight for the RGW 90.
Germany with the programme Leichtes Wirkmittel 1800+ was looking for a light weapon with a range superior than that of the RGW 90. The demand was coming from the special forces following their experience in Afghanistan. Among the problems raised were the incapacity to treat asymmetric targets such as snipers, pickups with heavy machine guns without collateral damage in urban environments or without weapons with enough range with their light equipment. The programme was known as the LWM 1800+, for which 3'100 missiles were required.
The competitor against the Enforcer was the Spike SR.
Unknown buyer
At the end of 2023, MBDA disclosed the securing of an export order of the missile. The client, the quantity, the value and the timeline are unknown. The fire control sight ordered for the Enforcer is the Hensoldt Dynahawk.

==== SADM (V/SHORAD) ====
Germany
The SADM was selected by the German Army in May 2025 to be used with the Skyranger 30. The German variant will include 9 missiles per vehicle, the Skyranger 30 could be equipped with up to 12 missiles.

=== Potential operators ===
==== Enforcer - base variant ====
Australia
MBDA Deutschland is offering the Enforcer missile to the Australian Military for the Phase 2 of the Land 159 programme. The programme is known as "Lethality System Project", and the phase 2 of the programme is known as "Short Range Direct Fire Support Weapon".
According to MBDA, the Enforcer is complying with the needs expressed by the military. The aim is to replace the M72 LAW and the Carl Gustaf M3.

==== Enforcer air ====
Germany
Mentions of the opportunity to integrate the missile to the future German Army H145M multirole attack helicopter.
