= MBDA Deutschland GmbH =

German defense company

Coordinates: 48.56878°N 11.21818°E

- Company type: Subsidiary
- Industry: Arms industry
- Founded: 1995
- Headquarters: Schrobenhausen, Germany
- Key people: Thomas Gottschild, Managing Director; Antoine Bouvier, chairman of the supervisory board
- Revenue: €338 million (2022)
- Number of employees: 1,200 (2024)
- Parent: MBDA
- Subsidiaries: Bayern-Chemie; TDW
- Website: mbda-deutschland.de

MBDA Deutschland GmbH is a German missile systems company. Together with its 100% subsidiaries Bayern-Chemie and TDW, it forms MBDA Germany. The latter is a wholly owned subsidiary of MBDA, representing its German national division. In addition to the headquarters in Schrobenhausen, MBDA Germany has sites in Ulm and Aschau am Inn.

MBDA Germany is the leading missile systems company in Germany. It develops, manufactures and provides customer and product support for guided missile systems and subsystems to the Air Force, Army and Navy. Today, the company focuses on air defense systems. MBDA Germany has also a leading position in the field of laser weapons technologies. It has 1300 employees and with an annual sales of 400 million euros in 2011.

From 2006 to April 2012, the headquarters in Schrobenhausen was enhanced and modernized. For this reason, modern laboratory- and office buildings, a new integration hall and a simulation centre were built. Furthermore, there is a new staff restaurant, a car park and a gym. Overall, MBDA Germany invested more than €60 million in new infrastructure.

== Products ==
MBDA Deutschland GmbH and its subsidiaries manufacture or are involved as partners or subcontractors in the manufacturing of the following products:

=== Anti-tank missiles ===
- MILAN
- MBDA Enforcer
- PARS 3 LR

=== Air-to-air missiles ===
- Meteor missile

=== Anti-air missiles ===
- RIM-116 RAM
- MIM-104 Patriot

=== Cruise missiles ===
- Taurus KEPD 350

=== Products of subsidiaries ===
- TDW:
  - Warheads for anti-tank missiles: MILAN, HOT, PARS 3 LR, Brimstone 2
  - Warheads for air-to-air missiles: AIM-9 Sidewinder, AIM-132 ASRAAM, METEOR
  - Warheads for anti-air missiles: CAMM, Mistral, Patriot PAC-3, RIM-116 RAM, RIM-162 ESSM, Roland
  - Warhead for anti-radiation missiles: ALARM
  - Warhead for anti-ship missiles: AS.34 Kormoran, Kormoran-2, NSM, RBS15 Mk3
  - Warhead for torpedoes: Sting Ray Mod 1, Spearfish Upgrade
  - Tandem penetrators: STABO (MW-1 weapon), MEPHISTO (Taurus KEPD 350)
  - Fuzes: PIMPF for anti-bunker bombs
- Bayern-Chemie:
  - Ejection and cruise motors of the MBDA Enforcer
  - Solid fuel propulsion for missiles: AS.34 Kormoran, Brimstone, HOT, MEADS, Meteor, MILAN, Patriot missiles (PAC-2, PAC-2 GEM-T), Roland, SeaWolf
  - Gas generators for missiles IR guidance: AIM-9 Sidewinder, Aspide
  - Submarine emergency surfacing system ResusSolid for Type 212 and Type 214
  - De-Orbiting rockets for satellites

=== Projects in development ===
- Missiles:
  - AQUILA missile (as part of HYDIS²) as a partner
  - Joint Fire Support Missile
  - SADM (Small Anti Drone Missile) to be equipped on the Skyranger 30 and Skywarden NNbS
  - 3SM Tyrfing future anti-ship missile with Kongsberg and Diehl
- Effectors:
  - High energy laser effector
  - RCM² (Remote Carrier Multidomain Multirole Effector) for the Future Combat Air System
- Bayern-Chemie:
  - SABRE rocket engine (Synergetic Air Breathing Rocket Engine) as a partner
  - Patriot PAC-2 GEM-T

=== Cancelled projects ===
- MEADS
- LFK NG
- Bayern-Chemie:
  - HFK missile
  - Red Kite two-stage rocket
