= Ottokar Brzoza =

Polish wheeled tank destroyer

- Type: Tank destroyer
- Place of origin: Poland, United Kingdom, Czech Republic

Production history
- Manufacturer: PGZ-Ottokar

Specifications
- Mass: 16 tonne
- Length: 6,20 m
- Width: 2,55 m
- Crew: 2

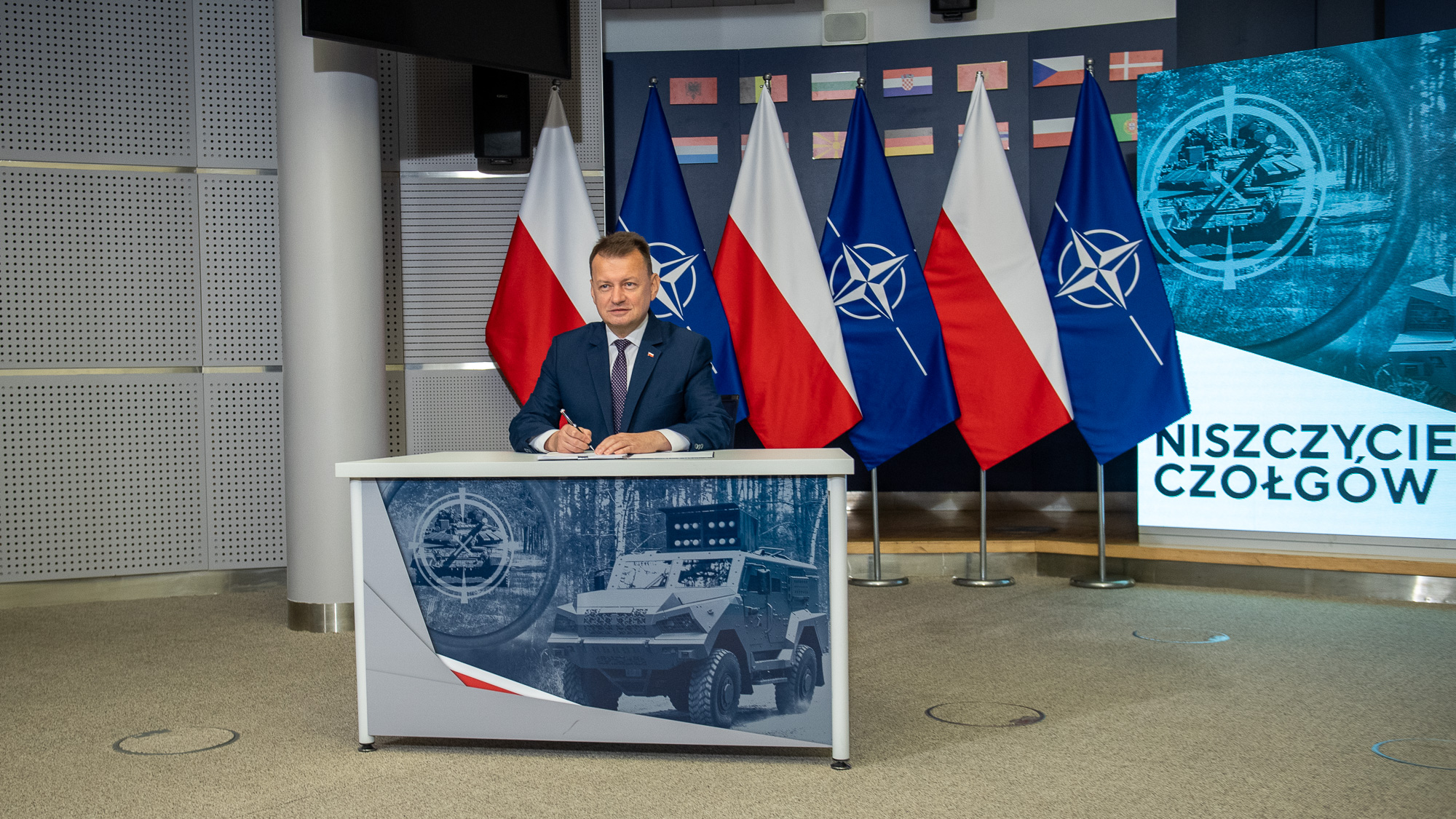
Ministry of National Defense and Deputy Prime Minister Mariusz Błaszczak approves the contract for the delivery of Ottokar Brzoza

Ottokar Brzoza is a wheeled tank destroyer developed by the Polish Consortium PGZ – Ottokar, consisting of: Polska Grupa Zbrojeniowa (consortium leader), Huta Stalowa Wola, Mesko, Zakłady Mechaniczne Tarnów. The basic task of tank destroyers will be to destroy armoured targets using anti-tank guided missiles, in all weather conditions, both day and night. It is named after the Polish artillery commander Colonel Ottokar Brzoza-Brzezina

== Development ==
The 9P133 Malyutka-P tank destroyer system currently in the army's possession is an outdated system. Their role is played by old BRDM-2 vehicles equipped with 9M14 Malyutka missile launchers.

In 2019, the Ottokar Brzoza program was launched, replacing the previously closed Barakuda program. Several firms signed up for the first talks in March 2019. Of these, five were selected for further negotiation. They were: PGZ S.A., OBRUM Sp. z o.o., Huta Stalowa Wola S.A., MBDA UK Ltd, and IMI Systems – Elbit Systems Ltd. However, the dialogue did not bring the expected result, because a second tender was announced in December 2019. Only PGZ S.A., MBDA UK Ltd., Lockheed Martin Global Inc, Rheinmetall Defence Polska Sp. z o.o. and AMZ Kutno S.A. participated in it. After analyzing the offers, the PGZ Ottokar consortium decided to implement the contract.

On July 20, 2022, the Minister of National Defense signed a framework agreement for the implementation of the Ottokar-Brzoza program for a modern tank destroyer produced in Poland. In 2023, the contractor was to deliver the first prototype tank destroyers. During the 31st International Defence Industry Exhibition MSPO 2023 in Kielce, in the Polish Armaments Group Pavilion, Huta Stalowa Wola presented for the first time the wheeled tank destroyer Ottokar – Brzoza built based on Waran 4x4 Armoured personnel carrier

== Armament ==
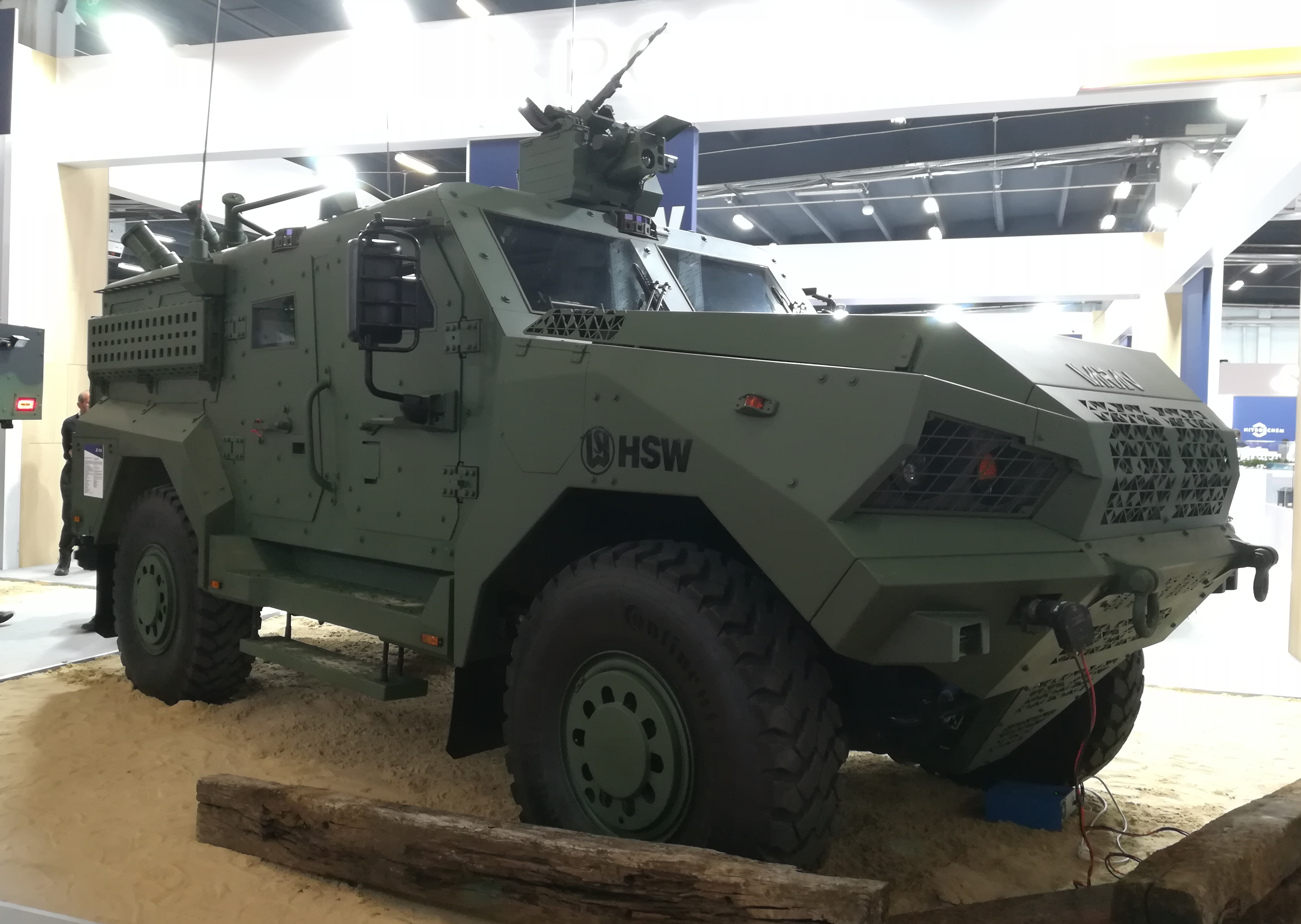
Waran 4x4

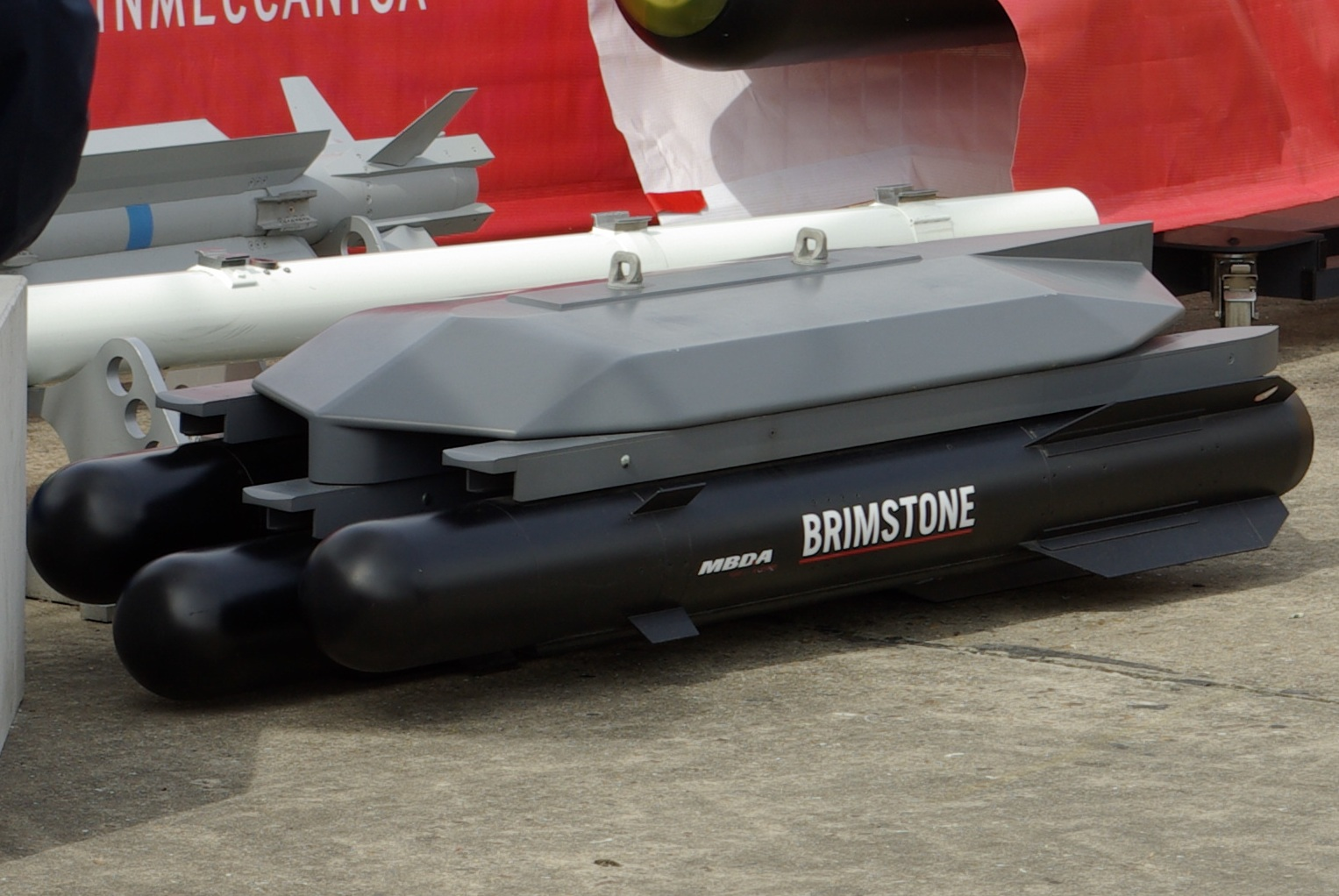
Brimstone missile

The vehicle is based on the Waran 4x4, which includes a number of other variants of that vehicle, such as: command and reconnaissance vehicles, as well as ammunition, medical evacuation and workshop vehicles based on Jelcz military trucks. The expected complement of the battery fire module will include: 8 tank destroyers, 1 battery commander's command vehicle and 2 platoon commanders' command vehicles, 2 ammunition vehicles, 2 artillery reconnaissance vehicles, 2 medical evacuation vehicles, 1 universal mobile container chassis repair workshop and 1 universal mobile container weapons and electronics workshop.

Ottokar Brzoza uses Brimstone anti-tank guided missile launcher. The base vehicle is a pick-up chassis variant, on which a swinging, transverse launcher is installed, which can hold 6 anti-tank guided missiles. The crew consists of two soldiers. An important feature of Brimstone is its laser guidance, the missile is equipped with its own radar, thanks to which it can actively search for a target. The radar is activated during the missile's flight, after it has been launched – the result is, radar waves emissions do not reveal the location of the launcher.

The design of the missiles allows the vehicle to be fired, for example, from behind the cover of hills or forest, without direct visibility of the target and from a distance greater than the range of fire of tank guns. and the possibility of firing salvos - firing all the missiles within a few seconds. Which can be fired over friendly units and vehicles – the missile is able to recognize the type of target, distinguish buses from tanks, for example, and target specific enemy vehicles. The attack can occur automatically or after confirmation by the operator. The missile weighs 49 kg and has a range of about 12 km, but work is underway on another version with a significantly extended range

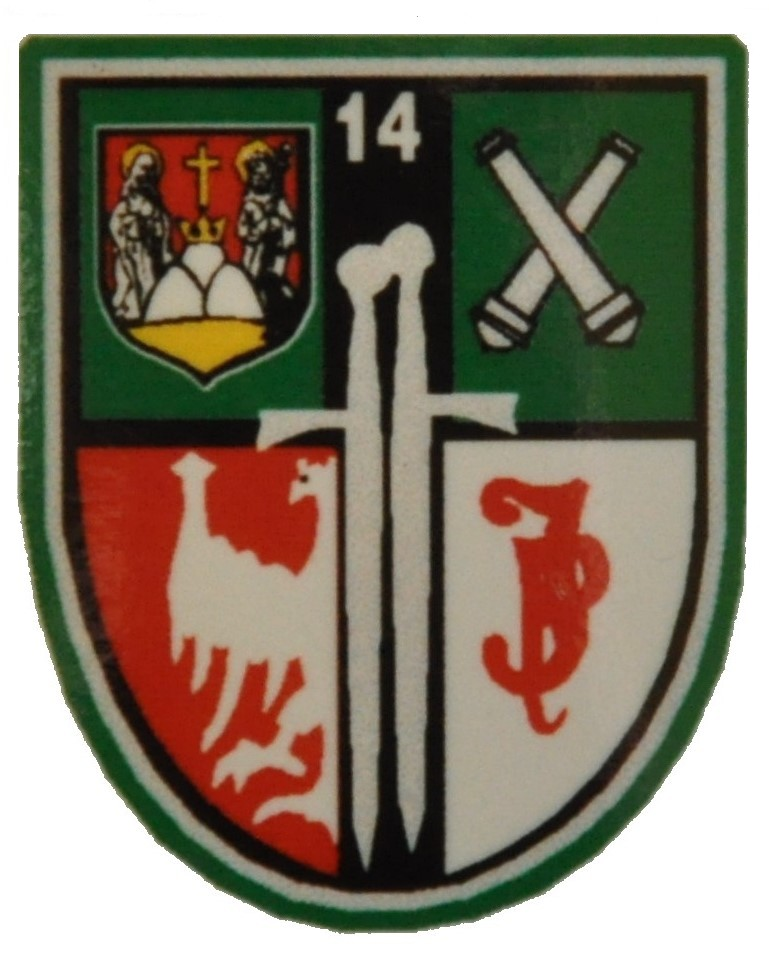
Badge of 14th Anti-Tank Artillery Regiment

The vehicle is also equipped in Fonet internal and external digital communication systems supplied by Radmor as standard. The whole, like most other systems, can be connected to the integrated command and fire control system ZZKO Topaz.

== Delivery ==
In the first instance, the first tank destroyers are to be delivered to the 14th Anti-Tank Artillery Regiment named after Marshal Józef Piłsudski.
