= PARS 3 LR =

German-French air-to-surface missile

PARS 3 long-range
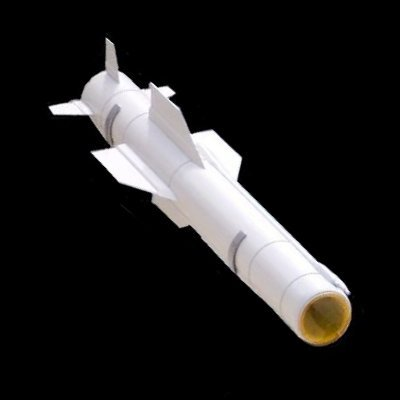
- PARS 3 LR
- Type: Air-to-surface missile Air-to-air missile Surface-to-surface missile Anti-tank guided missile
- Place of origin: Germany

Production history
- Designed: 1988–2011
- Manufacturer: Parsys GmbH, MBDA Deutschland GmbH, Diehl BGT Defence,
- Unit cost: €600,000
- Produced: 2012–present
- Variants: see text

Specifications
- Mass: 49 kilograms (108 lb)
- Length: 1,600 millimetres (63 in)
- Diameter: 159 millimetres (6.3 in)
- Warhead: 9 kg (19.84 lb) tandem HEAT; 1,000+ mm RHA penetration after ERA from TDW
- Detonation mechanism: impact
- Engine: solid fuel rocket
- Operational range: up to 8 kilometres (5.0 mi)[3]
- Maximum speed: 1,044 kilometres per hour (290 m/s)
- Guidance system: Target acquisition: passive IR and television CCD sensors in a mast mounted on launching helicopter Missile guidance: passive IR CCD sensors in the missile
- Launch platform: Helicopter

The PARS 3 LR (German: Panzerabwehr-Raketensystem 3 Long Range, anti-tank rocket system 3 long range) in German service, also known as TRIGAT-LR (third generation anti-tank, long range) and AC 3G in French, is a fire-and-forget missile, which can be used against air or ground targets. It is intended for long range applications and designed to defeat tanks, helicopters and other individual targets, while minimizing the exposure of the launch vehicle to enemy fire. It is to be the main weapon system of the Eurocopter Tiger helicopter. The PARS 3 LR will be able to be fired in salvos of up to four in eight seconds. The missile can be applied in direct attack or top-attack modes.

== Development ==
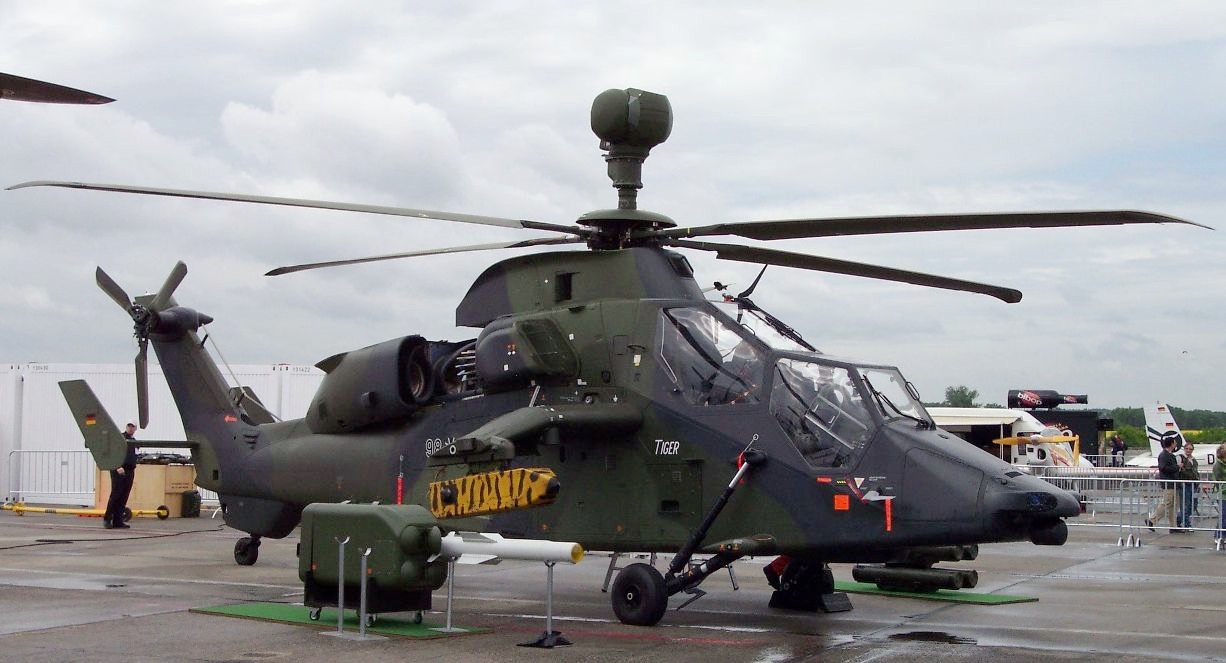
German Army Eurocopter Tiger armed with the PARS 3

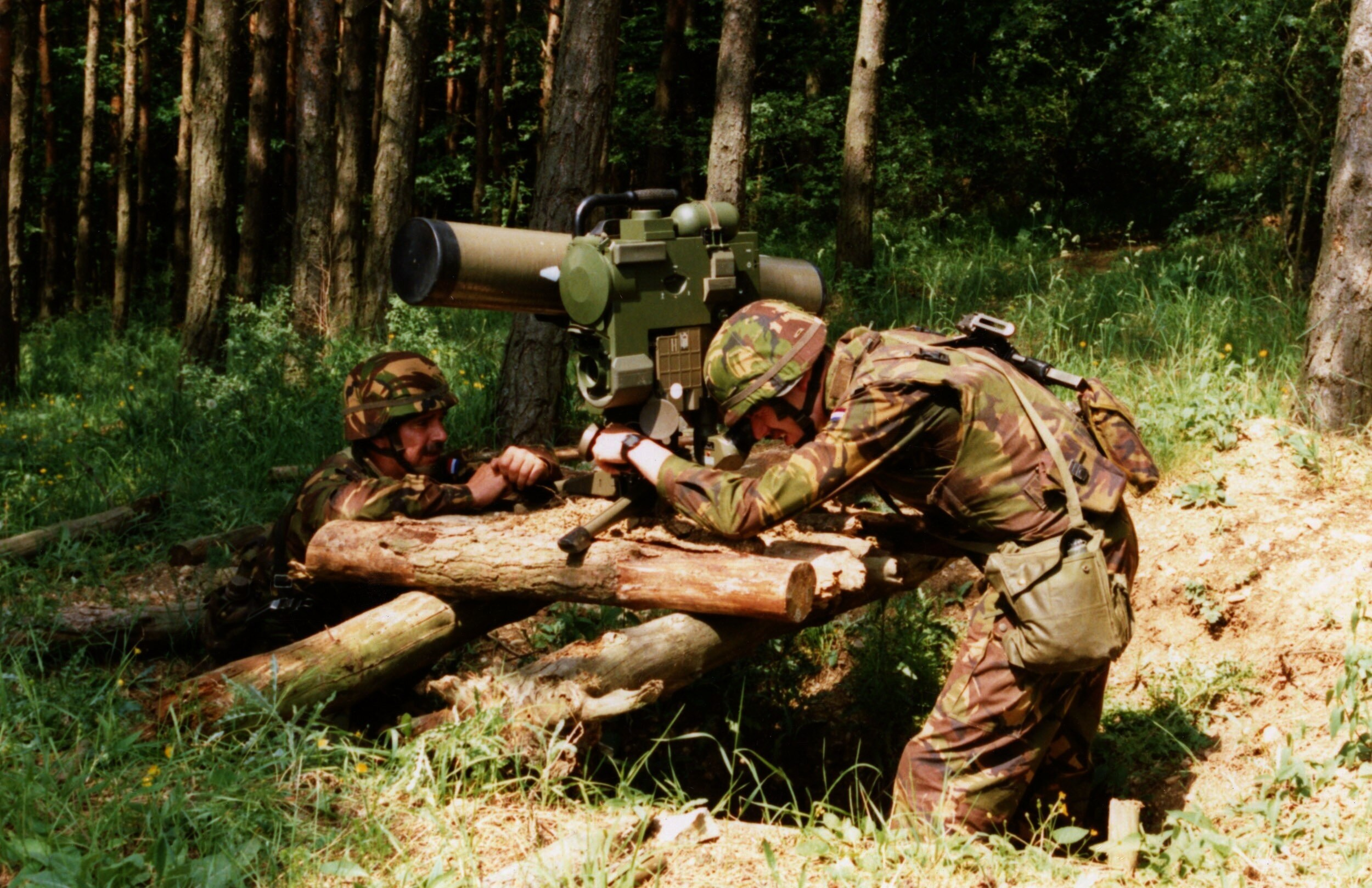
Field trials of the now-cancelled TRIGAT-MR crew-served anti-tank weapon system

The program was initiated by Germany, France and the United Kingdom. After the UK withdrew, only Germany and France remained. The manufacturer is Parsys GmbH, a joint venture between MBDA Deutschland GmbH and Diehl BGT Defence.

A lighter, medium-range and man-portable version called Trigat-MR (MR for medium range) was also planned; it was later cancelled. The project evolved into the proposed Trigan system, which is based on the MILAN 3 firing posts and the Trigat-MR missile.

France withdrew from the program in 2004. On 30 June 2006, Germany ordered 680 PARS 3 LR missiles for €380 million. Deliveries began in 2012. Indonesia also ordered 700 PARS 3 LR missiles for €420 million. Deliveries began in 2018.

== See also ==
- AGM-114 Hellfire – (United States)
- 9K114 Shturm – (Soviet Union)
- LMUR – (Russia)
- Barq – (Pakistan)
- 9M120 Ataka – (Soviet Union)
- Brimstone – (United Kingdom)
- Euromissile HOT – (West Germany)
- Nag – (India)
- Spike-ER – (Israel)
- UMTAS – (Turkey)
- List of missiles
