= TDW =

German defense industry company

TDW Gesellschaft für verteidigungstechnische Wirksysteme mbH
- Type: Subsidiary
- Industry: Defence
- Founded: 1994
- Headquarters: Schrobenhausen, Germany
- Area served: Worldwide
- Key people: Ulrich Störchle (Managing Director)
- Products: Warheads, Fuzes, Distance Sensors
- Number of employees: 150
- Parent: MBDA Deutschland GmbH (formerly LFK GmbH)
- Website: tdw-warhead-systems.com

TDW (Gesellschaft für verteidigungstechnische Wirksysteme mbH) is a European company that develops and manufactures warheads for guided weapons. The company was founded in 1994 and has 150 employees based in Schrobenhausen, Germany. TDW is a 100% subsidiary of MBDA Deutschland GmbH and part of the European guided weapon group MBDA.

== History ==
The history of what is now TDW began in the 1960s at the site in Schrobenhausen where the company has been located ever since. The business started as part of Bölkow, later Messerschmitt-Bölkow-Blohm (MBB) before it became DASA. TDW as a separate legal entity was founded 1994 as a spin-off of DASA, which continued to control the business as subsidiary. All missile activities of DASA and Dornier GmbH 1995 were consolidated into LFK-Lenkflugkörpersysteme GmbH which owned 100% of TDW. Together with LFK, TDW has been consolidated into EADS (now Airbus) which has sold LFK GmbH and its subsidiary TDW, to the European missile group MBDA in 2006. LFK GmbH has changed its company name to MBDA Deutschland GmbH in 2012.

== Products ==
TDW has customers in France, Germany, Norway, Sweden, Turkey, the UK, and the United States. The product portfolio of TDW encompasses all sorts of conventional warheads, blast/fragmentation and lethality-enhancers for air defence, penetrators for bunker-busting and anti-ship application, shaped charges to defeat tanks and multi-effect warheads to defeat several target categories. In 2013 a newly developed Mk82 warhead was demonstrated with a novel scalable technology that is able to adjust the explosive effect to a level appropriate to the military target, minimizing collateral damage. The Programmable Intelligent Multi Purpose Fuze (PIMPF) is a void sensing and layer counting fuze in service with the warheads of NSM and Taurus.

TDW products can be found in:

=== Anti-tank ===
- MILAN 1, MILAN 2, MILAN 2T, MILAN 3
- HOT, HOT-2, HOT-3
- PARS 3 LR (formerly TRIGAT LR)
- Brimstone 2

=== Anti-air ===
- ALARM
- Roland
- Sidewinder / RAM
- PAC-3 (lethality enhancer)
- ASRAAM
- ESSM
- Mistral
- METEOR
- CAMM (missile family)

=== Anti-ship ===
- AS.34 Kormoran, Kormoran-2
- NSM
- RBS15 Mk3

=== Tandem penetrators ===
- STABO runway cratering submunition for MW-1
- MEPHISTO for the Taurus KEPD 350

=== Torpedoes ===
- Sting Ray Mod 1
- Spearfish Mod 1

=== Fuzes ===
- PIMPF
