= Friedl Rinder =

German chess player (1905–2001)

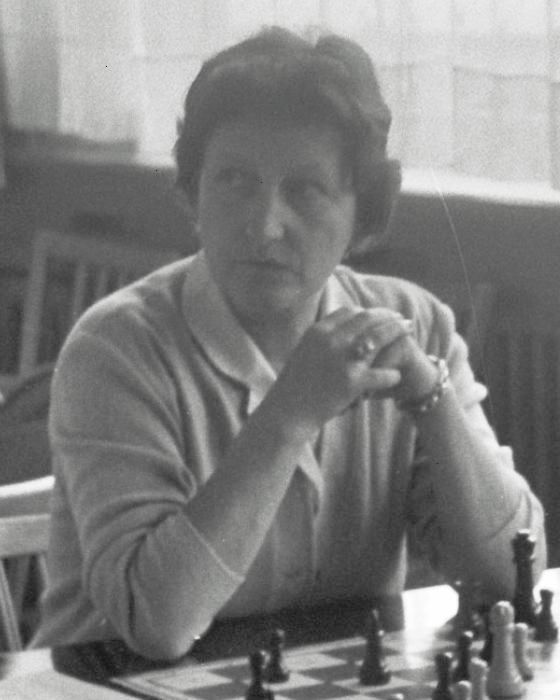
Friedl Rinder, 1959 at Dahn

Friedl Rinder (née Benzinger) (November 20, 1905, in Schrobenhausen – June 3, 2001) was a German woman chess master.

Rinder won the 1st Women's German championship at Stuttgart 1939. She took 4th place in the 7th Women's World Chess Championship (scoring 15/19) at Buenos Aires 1939 (Vera Menchik won).

After World War II, she won the women's national (West German) championship four times (1949, 1955, 1956 and 1959). She tied for 12–13th in Candidates Tournament at Plovdiv 1959 (Kira Zvorykina won), and tied for 15–16th in Candidates Tournament at Vrnjacka Banja 1961 (Nona Gaprindashvili won).

She played thrice for West Germany at first board in Women's Chess Olympiad:

- 1st Olympiad at Emmen 1957 (+5 –4 =5);
- 2nd Olympiad at Split 1963 (+4 –3 =4);
- 3rd Olympiad at Oberhausen 1966 (+1 –5 =4).

Rinder was awarded the WIM title in 1957. She had a son, Gerd (who played chess to a good level and was Bavarian Champion in 1960) and a daughter. Prior to her marriage, she studied singing and the piano.
