= Bauer GmbH & Co. KGaA =

German construction and machinery manufacturing company

- Type: GmbH & Co. KGaA
- Industry: Construction, mechanical engineering, environmental technology
- Founded: 1790
- Headquarters: Schrobenhausen, Germany
- Key people: Bauer Management GmbH
- Revenue: EUR 1.7 billion (2025)
- Number of employees: 10,500 (2025)
- Website: www.bauer.de/en

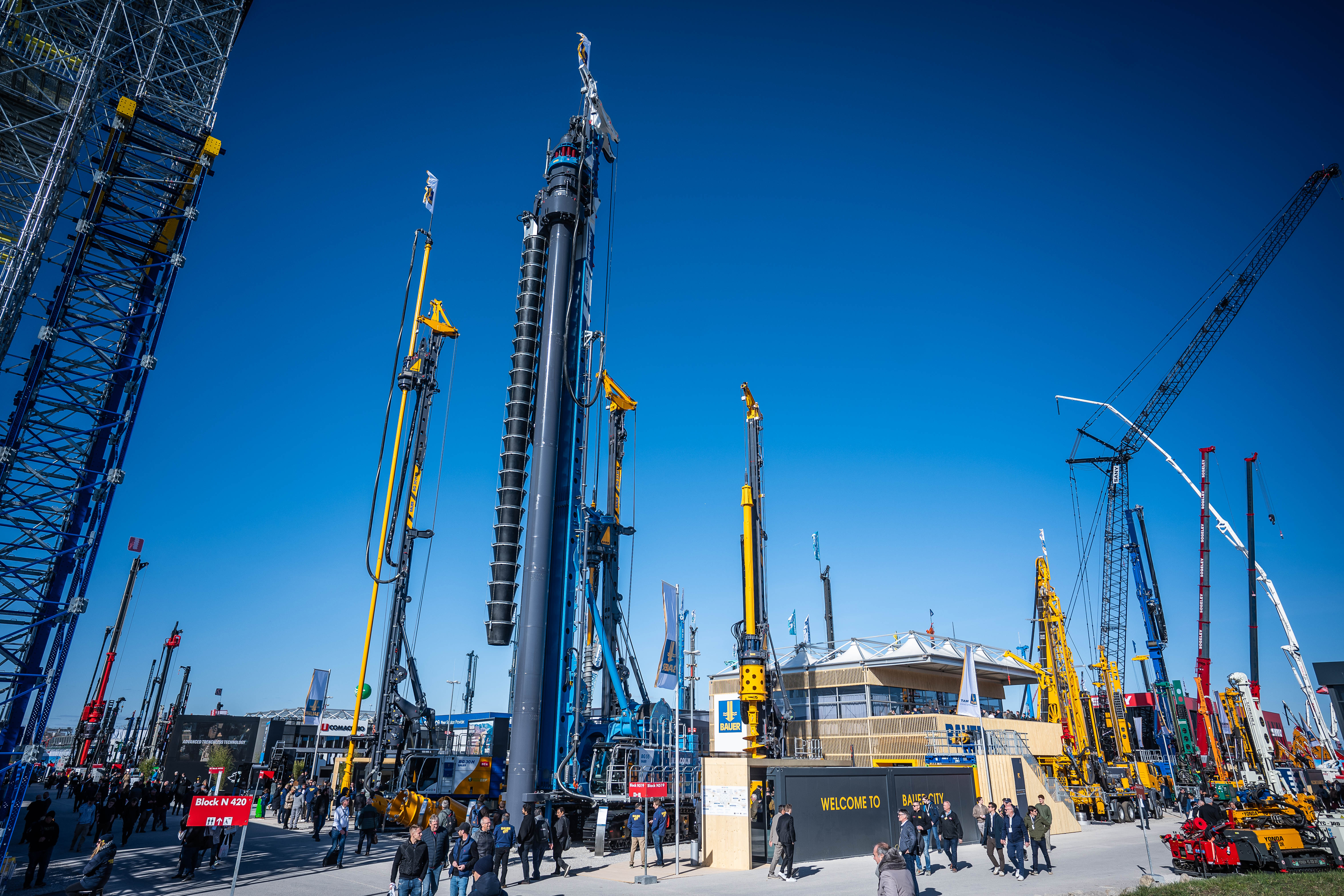
Booth of BAUER Maschinen Group at bauma 2025 in Munich

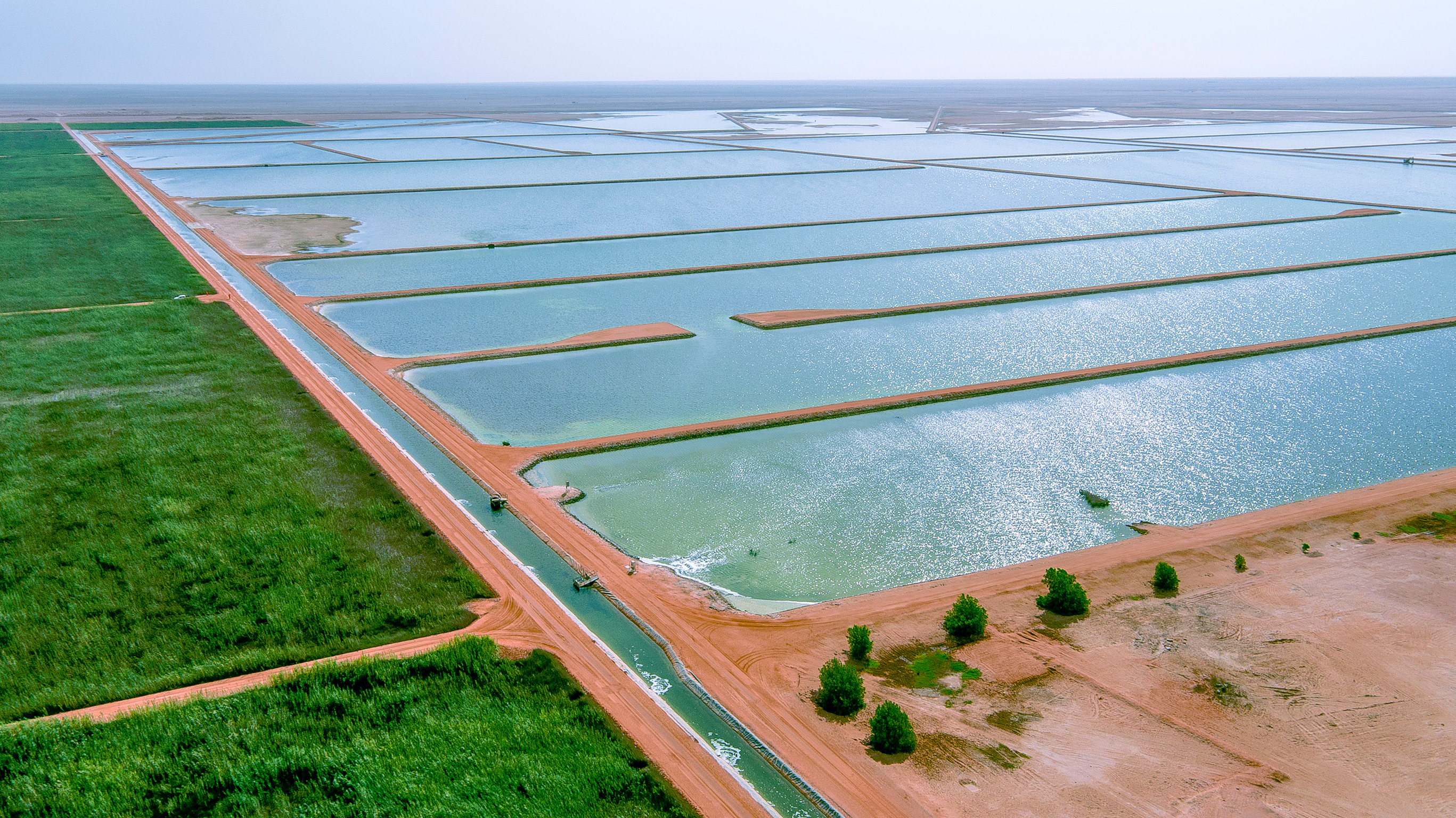
In the midst of a desert landscape, BAUER Nimr LLC in Oman operates the world's largest commercial, natural reed bed water treatment plant.

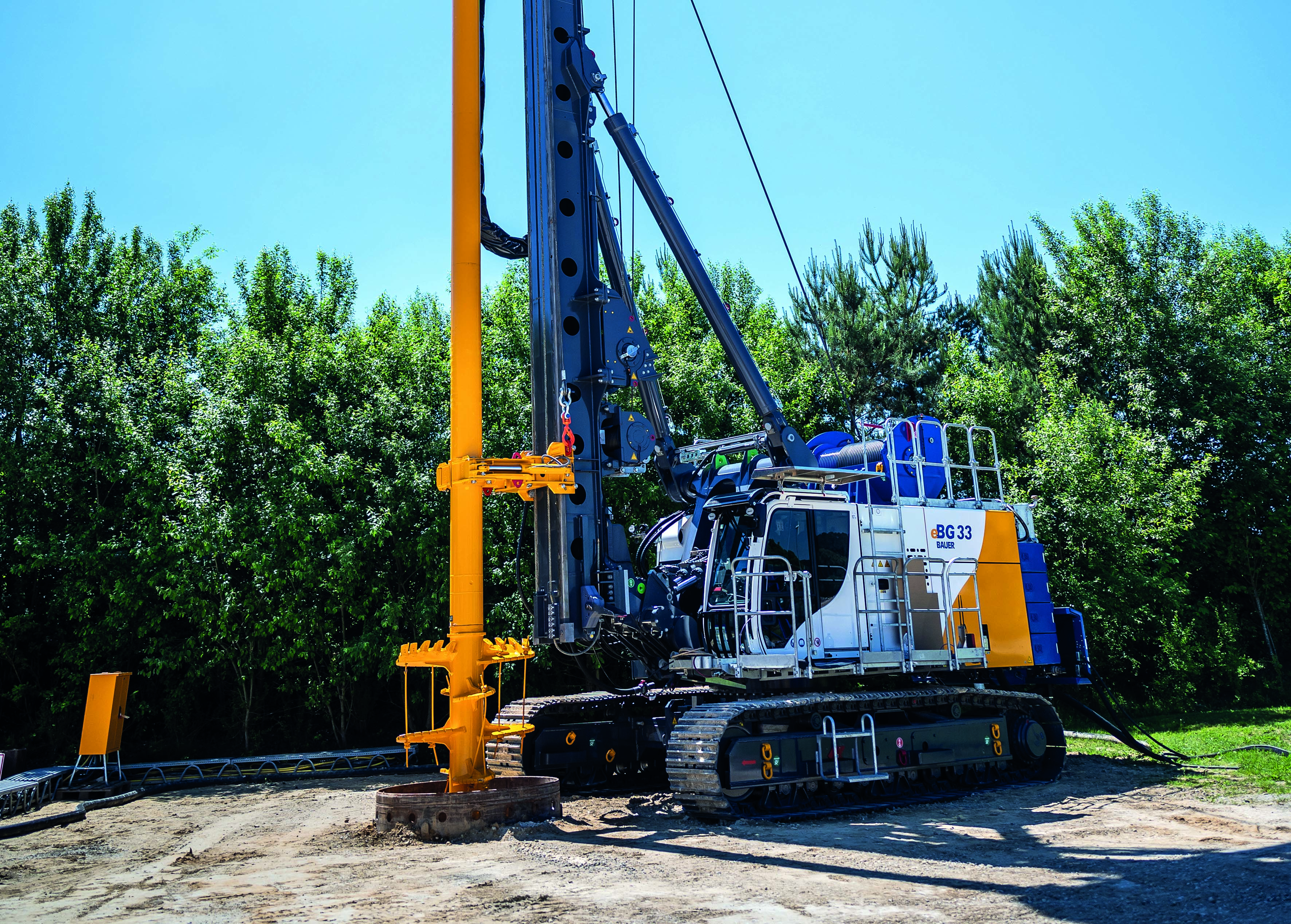
The eBG 33 was launched in 2021 as the first electrically powered Bauer drill rig.

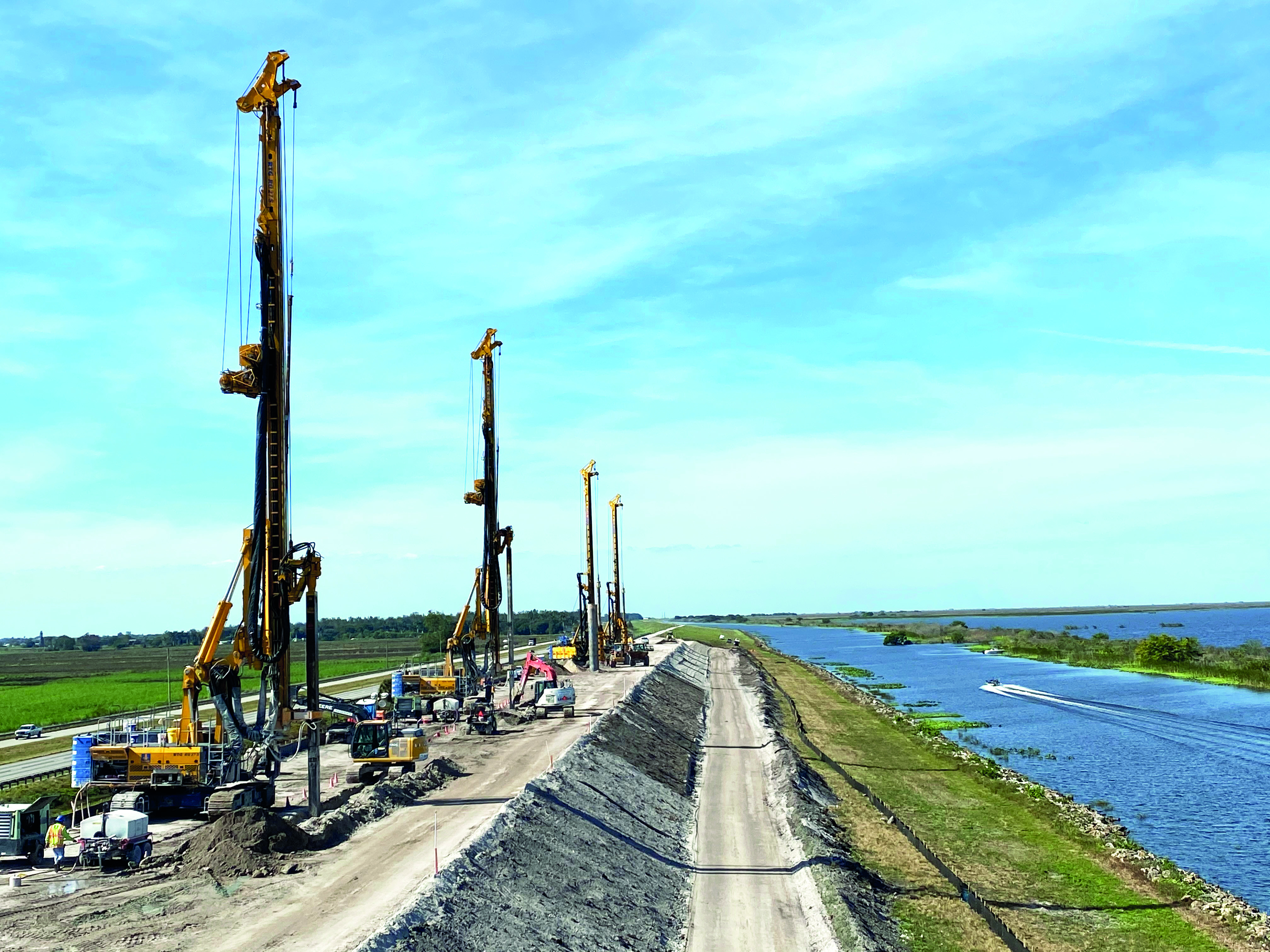
To protect against storm surges and flooding, Bauer is carrying out various task orders on the Herbert Hoover Dike in Florida.

Bauer GmbH & Co. KGaA is a construction and machinery manufacturing company based in Schrobenhausen in Upper Bavaria, Germany.

The core business is the execution of complex excavation pits, foundations and vertical seals as well as the development and manufacture of machines for this purpose. In 2024, the companies of the BAUER Group achieved total Group revenues of EUR 2.2 billion with around 11,000 employees worldwide.

== History ==
In 1790, Sebastian Bauer (acting under the name Paur) from Deggendorf, son of a coppersmith family in the prior generation from Osterhofen (Lower Bavaria), took on a coppersmith's shop in Schrobenhausen. For over a century, the coppersmith's shop participated in the establishment of breweries, performed roofing work with copper and manufactured objects for everyday household use.

In 1902, Andreas Bauer drilled an artesian well for the new railway station water house in Schrobenhausen, which would make well-drilling a new business segment of the company. For his son Karl Bauer, the construction of the central water supply for the city of Schrobenhausen in 1928 was a key project. It was with this reference that he switched operations toward those of a well-drilling company and would soon become active with building wells and water supply facilities for cities and industrial enterprises all over Bavaria.

Karlheinz Bauer, born in 1928, and company shareholder since 1953, became the sole managing director in 1956 and switched operations to specialist foundation engineering. Two years later followed the invention of the ground anchor (injection anchor) on the construction site of the Bayerischer Rundfunk building in Munich. The company then applied for a patent on the construction procedure and began to market it internationally. The first overseas construction site was in Switzerland in 1959. The ground anchor was used here too, thus beginning its success story. In the 1960s, the construction procedure was primarily used in subway construction in numerous cities throughout the German Federal Republic.

In 1969, the company began designing and constructing an anchor drilling rig and in so doing took its first step toward becoming a machinery manufacturer. In 1975, the company received its first contracts in Libya, Saudi Arabia and the United Arab Emirates. In the subsequent period, Bauer Spezialtiefbau continued to expand its construction activities and equipment sales to more countries. From the mid-1980s, it had established new focal areas in the Far East.

In 1976, the BG 7 heavy-duty rotary drilling rig was added to the machinery portfolio. Over the decades that followed, the BG range would develop into the core area of Bauer's mechanical engineering division. In 1984, it would develop and construct its own trench cutter. Two years later, Thomas Bauer – who had been part of the company since 1984 – became the sole managing director. Under his leadership, the internationalization of the BAUER Group in the machinery manufacturing and specialist foundation engineering sectors took place.

In 1990, BAUER und MOURIK Umwelttechnik GmbH & Co. was founded. After 2002, with the acquisition of FWS Filter- und Wassertechnik GmbH, BAUER Umwelt GmbH emerged. In 1992, the Thuringian company Schachtbau Nordhausen GmbH was acquired. The year before, together with Schachtbau Nordhausen, the subsidiary SPESA Spezialbau und Sanierung GmbH was founded.

In 1994, BAUER Aktiengesellschaft was founded as a holding company, whereby Deutsche Beteiligungs AG received shares of BAUER AG due to a capital increase in 1996. In 2001, with the restructuring, the BAUER Group was brought into being. BAUER Maschinen GmbH with the companies Klemm Bohrtechnik, MAT Mischanlagentechnik, RTG Rammtechnik, Eurodrill, TracMec and PILECO, became an independent operator on the market. On July 4, 2006, BAUER AG went public. On April 20, 2007, the company acquired German Water and Energy GmbH (GWE), and in so doing successfully expanded its commercial activities to include well technology, water and geothermal energy. The company's entire market presence was reorganized into the three main segments Construction, Equipment and Resources.

In the two years that followed, the machinery manufacturing plants in Aresing, Nordhausen, Tianjin (China) and Shanghai were expanded, and a new plant with over 34,000 m^{2} of hall space was opened in Edelshausen as was a new machinery manufacturing plant in Conroe (Texas, United States).

In 2010, cutter technology celebrated its 25-year anniversary, and the biggest plant-based purification facility in the world to date was completed in Oman by Bauer Resources. During the course of 2012, the company exceeded the 10,000 employees worldwide mark for the first time. In 2011 and 2012, the Hong Kong subsidiary of the Bauer Group was involved in the construction of an underground railroad station for the Guangzhouo-Shenzhen-Hong Kong high-speed rail line.

This was followed by contracts for the foundation work of what will be the world's tallest building (Jeddah Tower) and Europe's tallest building (Lakhta Center), as well as in 2014 the execution of the company's largest foundation engineering contract in Germany to date: the Schwarzkopf Tunnel bypass rail project in the Spessart region (Schwarzkopf Tunnel is part of the Main–Spessart railway). In 2015, Bauer celebrated its 225th anniversary and won the largest single contract in the company's history with the Kesslergrube remediation project. In 2017, the order for the expansion of the constructed wetland in Oman, completed in 2010, followed. A joint venture with Schlumberger existed from 2015 to 2020. In 2018, Thomas Bauer stepped down from the executive board and took over as chairman of the supervisory board. In December 2023, Thomas Bauer stepped down from the supervisory board of BAUER AG and handed over the chairmanship to Bastian Fuchs.

As part of the construction work for the Saudi Arabian megaproject NEOM, the subsidiary Saudi BAUER Foundation Contractors Ltd. was awarded a contract in August 2022 for a first specialist foundation engineering project - the installation of approx. 70 m deep large-diameter bored piles for The Line. At the end of 2022, Bauer was awarded the contract for the foundation work for two further construction sections of The Line.

As part of the project to replace the Kriegenbrunn lock near Erlangen, BAUER Spezialtiefbau GmbH, together with its joint venture partners Züblin Spezialtiefbau GmbH and Ed. Züblin AG, began work on constructing the excavation enclosure in 2024. The centerpiece of the project is the main excavation pit, which is 330 m long and almost 30 m wide and deep.

In 2025, BAUER Resources GmbH unveiled its mobile soil washing plant for removing PFAS from contaminated soil, which was deployed at a military site in Manching near Ingolstadt. With a cleaning capacity of 150 m³/h, it is one of the largest plants of its kind in Germany to date.

== Group structure ==
The operations of the Group are divided into three segments: Geotechnical Solutions, Equipment and Resources. The Geotechnical Solutions segment offers specialist foundation engineering services and carries out foundation and excavation work, cut-off walls and ground improvements worldwide. Bauer's Equipment segment provides a full range of equipment for specialist foundation engineering as well as for the exploration, mining and extraction of natural resources. In the Resources Segment, Bauer operates with multiple business divisions and subsidiaries as service providers in the areas of drilling services and water wells, environmental services, constructed wetlands, mining and rehabilition. The company can also look back on numerous prestigious foundation projects, such as the Burj Khalifa or the Hong Kong-Zhuhai-Macau Bridge. The Group has a large number of subsidiaries, including Schachtbau Nordhausen.

Since March 15, 2023, SD Thesaurus GmbH and Doblinger Beteiligung GmbH - acting together - hold the majority of shares in BAUER AG. Since June 20, 2023, BAUER AG is no longer listed on the Frankfurt Stock Exchange.

With its entry in the Commercial Register on September 22, 2026, the change in legal form of BAUER AG to BAUER GmbH & Co. KGaA - as resolved by the Annual General Meeting on July 29, 2026 - became legally effective.

== Special construction methods ==
The companies of the Group has been a major driving force in the development of various construction methods for specialist foundation engineering. The well-known methods include:

- Diaphragm walls
- Sheet piles
- Soldier pile walls
- Anchor techniques
- Depth vibrators
- Jet Grouting
- Permeation Grouting
- Ground Improvement
- CSV soil stabilization
- The mixed-in-place (MIP method)
- Cutter soil mixing (CSM method)
- Prestressed micropiles
- Ductile piles

== Literature ==
- Franz Josef Mayer (editor): Bauer – Geschichte und Geschichten. Publisher Ballas, 2006, ISBN 978-3000185182
- Erwin Stötzer, Manfred Schöpf, Franz Josef Mayer, Klaus Englert: Spezialtiefbau – Festschrift zum 80.Geburtstag von Karlheinz Bauer. Publisher Ballas, 2008
