= Brimstone (missile) =

British air-to-surface missile

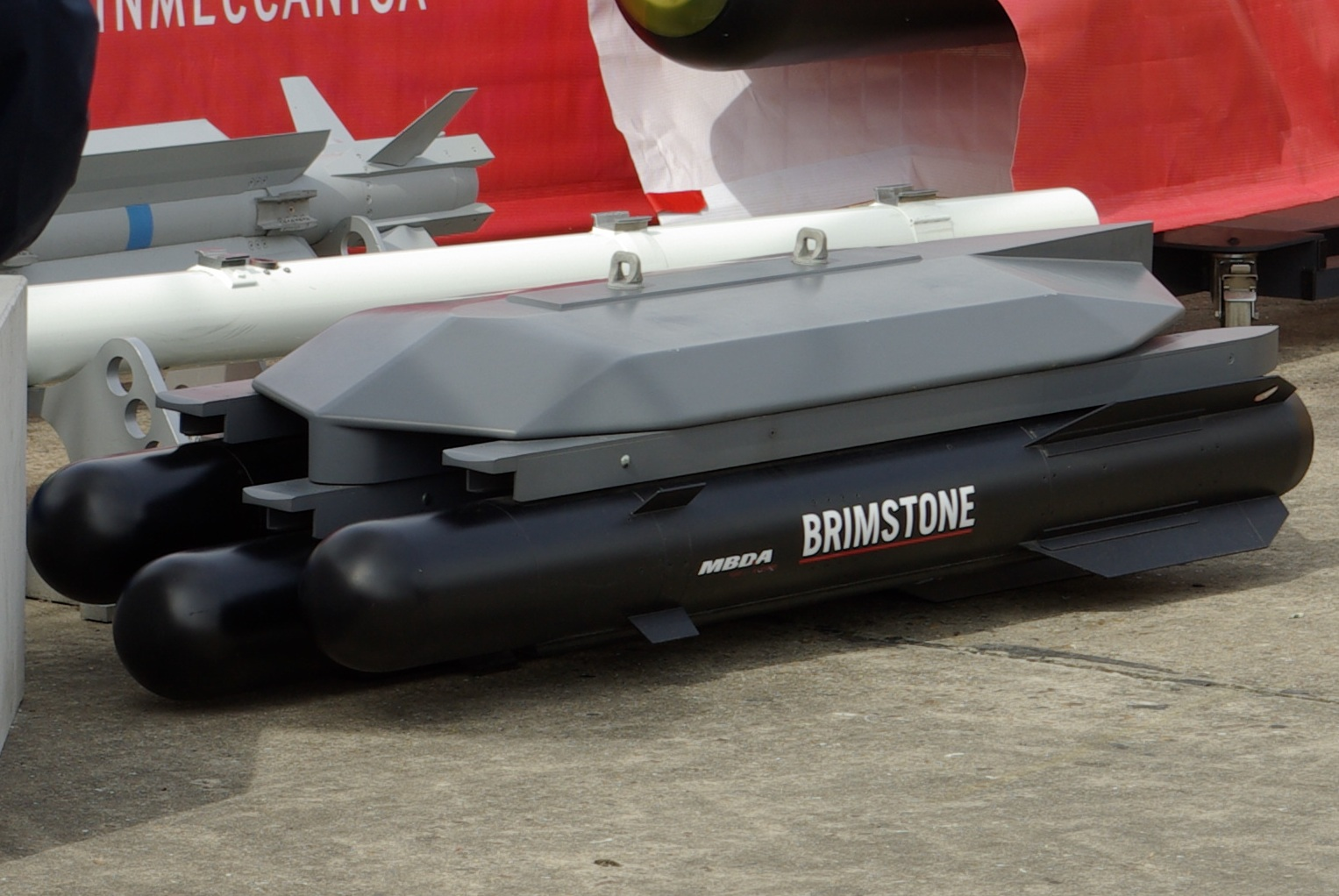
- A triplet of single-mode Brimstone missiles
- Type: Air-to-surface missile Surface-to-surface missile
- Place of origin: United Kingdom

Service history
- In service: 2005
- Used by: Royal Air Force; Royal Saudi Air Force; German Air Force; Armed Forces of Ukraine
- Wars: Operation Telic; Operation Herrick; Operation Ellamy; Operation Shader; Russo-Ukrainian War

Production history
- Designer: GEC-Marconi
- Designed: 1996
- Manufacturer: MBDA UK, Henlow
- Unit cost: (Dual mode variant) £105,000/unit £175,000 inc. development
- Produced: 1999
- Variants: Single mode; Dual mode sensor; Brimstone 2; Brimstone 3

Specifications
- Mass: 50 kg (110 lb)
- Length: 1.8 m (71 in)
- Diameter: 180 mm (7.1 in)
- Warhead: 6.3 kg (14 lb) HEAT tandem shaped warhead
- Detonation mechanism: Crush (impact) fuze Command fuze
- Engine: Solid-fuel rocket
- Operational range: Brimstone I 20+ km (12+ mi) from fixed wing, 12 km (7.5 mi) from rotor wing; Brimstone II 60+ km (37+ mi) from fixed wing, 40+ km (25+ mi) from rotor wing
- Maximum speed: Supersonic, ~450 m/s (~ Mach 1.3)
- Guidance system: 94-GHz millimetric-wave active radar homing and INS autopilot; dual-mode, II, and III adds laser guidance
- Steering system: Flight control surfaces
- Accuracy: Sub-1 m CEP (Note: More than 200% increase in maximum range – Flightglobal Oct 2013)
- Launch platform: Tornado GR4; Eurofighter Typhoon; Hydra drone (UK) (under development); Protector (planned)

Brimstone is a ground or air-launched ground attack missile developed by MBDA UK for the UK's Royal Air Force. It was originally intended for "fire-and-forget" use against mass formations of enemy armour, using a millimetre wave (mmW) active radar homing seeker to ensure accuracy even against moving targets. Experience in Afghanistan led to the addition of laser guidance in the dual-mode Brimstone missile, allowing a "spotter" to pick out specific and the highest priority targets, particularly useful to minimise collateral damage when friendly forces or civilians were in the area. The tandem shaped-charge warhead is much more effective against modern tanks than older similar weapons such as the AGM-65D Maverick missile. The Maverick however carries a 300 lb warhead to make up the difference in design. Three Brimstones are carried on a launcher that occupies a single weapon station, allowing a single aircraft to carry many missiles.

After a protracted development programme, single-mode or "millimetric" Brimstone entered service with RAF Tornado aircraft in 2005, and the dual-mode variant in 2008. The latter was used extensively in Afghanistan and Libya. An improved Brimstone 2 was expected to enter service in October 2012, but problems with the new warhead from TDW and the ROXEL rocket motor put back the planned date to November 2015. MBDA is studying the use of Brimstone on ships, attack helicopters, UAVs, and from surface launchers. However, it will not be integrated on the Lockheed Martin F-35 Lightning II. Germany, Qatar and Saudi Arabia have purchased the missile. The cost per missile has been quoted as £175,000 each in 2015, or "over £100,000".

== Development ==
=== Previous developments ===
There had been a number of British air-to-ground anti-armour concepts developed during the 1970s and 1980s, including the SNEB rocket, the proposed Hawkswing version of Swingfire, and ultimately the BL.755 cluster bomb. There were some alternatives offered during this time, including the 1966 Hawker Siddeley Dynamics (HSD) Cluster Martel proposal that mounted a cluster dispenser on the front of the Martel airframe to provide standoff capability.

=== AST.1227 ===
BL.755 formed the basis for the Royal Air Force's (RAF) anti-armour air-to-ground strikes for many years, but it was always considered to be "expensive" if it needed to be used against individual targets instead of mass attacks. There were also concerns about the use of such weapons near friendly troops. This led to the late-1970s Air Staff Target 1227 (AST.1227) for a guided weapon to replace BL.755.

One early respondent to the AST.1227 was a modification of the small SRAM missile, which had originally been designed to be carried in pods containing multiple missiles, meaning that in the air-to-ground mode a large number could be carried. However, the Ministry of Technology expressed concerns about using an infrared seeker in the anti-tank role, especially due to the possible use of anti-IR "dazzlers" and other countermeasures.

The next attempt adapted the Rapier airframe to carry a laser seeker, either the Martin Marietta design used on the M712 Copperhead or a similar Swedish RB.83 which was also used in the ground-to-air role. The result was "Sabre", which was expected to have a single-round hit rate of 80% and the ability for a single aircraft to carry up to 10 missiles. It also had the ability to be used on helicopters, not only as a replacement for Hawkswing, but also as an air-to-air weapon against enemy helicopters and low-flying aircraft.

AST.1227 was abandoned in 1981, and Sabre along with it, due to the development of "smart" munitions in the US. This led to the release of AST.1238 the same year, (Note: Janes says 1982, Gibson/Buttler say 1981.) calling for a long-term project to develop a self-guided weapon using a millimetre wavelength (mmW) radar seeker.

=== AST.1238 ===
The AST. 1238 received eight bids in November 1987, but down-selected to five in February 1988. These included the Hunting Engineering Smart Weapon Anti-Armour, an unpowered dispenser with sixteen submunitions that would be ejected at a pre-selected location and then use mmW seekers. BAe Dynamics proposed two designs, one from Hatfield based on the AGM-65 Maverick airframe with a new warhead and an imaging infrared seeker, and Stevenage had a second concept based on their Merlin anti-armour mortar round. BAE's aircraft division added the DASA (by this point MBB SE) VERBAL system, and ML Aviation and Rheinmetall offered another cluster dispenser. Finally, Marconi and Rockwell offered Brimstone, a version of AGM-114 Hellfire with a mmW seeker. Texas Instruments entered Griffin-38, a small direct-attack weapon, but it was unpowered and lacked the required stand-off range.

The project was officially started in 1988, before the end of Cold War, and the project was cancelled.

=== Gulf War experience, SR(A).1238 ===
Combat experience in the 1991 Gulf War led to a revaluation of many of the UK's ongoing weapons programmes. The RAF concluded that their low-level attack doctrine had been made far too specialized in its role in performing deep interdiction strikes and anti-airfield attacks. When used in the anti-armour role, their Panavia Tornado aircraft were exposed to ground fire, and they concluded some level of stand-off weapon was needed. AST.1238 was reactivated and became Staff Requirement (Air) SR(A).1238.

SR(A).1238 received five new bids. The Thorn Anti-Armour Weapons System was a powered BL.775. Hunting proposed a small cruise missile based on the German Mehrzweckwaffe-2, a powered version of the German Mehrzweckwaffe-1 cluster bomb dispenser. Known as Smart Weapon Anti-ARMour (SWAARM), it ejected a small number of smart munitions instead of a large number of bombs. Texas Instruments entered the similar Griffin-38, but it was unpowered and lacked the required stand-off range.

This left two designs in the running. BAe Dynamics proposed an updated version of their earlier SRAM-based concept using the newer and larger ASRAAM to produce Typhoon. GEC-Marconi offered their Advanced Anti-Armour Weapon (AAAW), a more refined version of their earlier Hellfire-based concept, using a 9 GHz MMW seeker that was completely fire-and-forget and could be used in all weather. Typhoon did not come close in performance terms, and AAAW won the contest.

GEC-Marconi (whose missile interests now form part of MBDA) was originally awarded the contract on 7 November 1996.

The first ground firing of the Brimstone missile occurred in August 1999, followed by the first air-launched firing from a Tornado GR4 in September 2000.

== Design ==
Brimstone has a 6.3 kg (14 lb) tandem shaped-charge warhead employing a smaller initial charge around 100 g (0.22 lb), designed to initiate reactive armour, followed by a larger, more destructive 6.2 kg (14 lb) charge, designed to penetrate and defeat the base armour. It was estimated that Brimstone would be several times more effective than the AGM-65G Maverick against modern tanks, and 20 times more effective than the BL755 cluster bomb. In combat, Brimstone has demonstrated accuracy and reliability "both well above 90 percent" according to the MoD; Air Chief Marshal Sir Stephen Dalton has said that 98.3% to 98.7% of Brimstone fired in Libya "did exactly what we expected".

=== Targeting and sensors ===
Brimstone is a "fire-and-forget" missile, which is loaded with targeting data by the weapon systems officer (WSO) prior to launch. It is programmable to adapt to particular mission requirements. This capability includes the ability to find targets within a certain area (such as those near friendly forces), and to self-destruct if it is unable to find a target within the designated area.

In addition to the semi-autonomous ability to decide its own targets, the Brimstone has the capacity to determine where on a target to best impact causing the most damage. The missile's advanced sensor package includes its extremely high frequency millimetric wave radar, which allows the weapon to image the target and hence choose a target location. With as many as twenty-four missiles in the air, the missile's targeting system also required an algorithm to ensure that missiles hit their targets in a staggered order, rather than all simultaneously.

Brimstone can be fired in a number of attack profiles; direct or indirect against single targets, a column of targets or against an array of targets. The latter utilises a salvo attack capability for multiple kills per engagement. Once launched, the platform is free to manoeuvre away from the target area or engage other targets.

=== Launch system ===
External image
- Harrier with four Brimstone launchers

Each launch system carries three missiles on rails. This allows a single aircraft to carry large numbers of missiles; for example, a Typhoon fighter could carry up to six launch systems, which gives a maximum payload of eighteen Brimstone missiles, in addition to a useful air-to-air payload. The missile was carried by the Tornado GR4 aircraft in RAF service. In February 2014 the National Audit Office warned of a possible capability gap under existing plans to fit Brimstone to Typhoon in 2021, two years after the Tornado retired; in June 2014 the MoD announced a study to accelerate this to 2018 and look at a common launcher that could also launch SPEAR Cap 3. MBDA has fired test rounds from an MQ-9 Reaper drone and is studying the use of Brimstone on attack helicopters and from surface launchers.

It was intended that Brimstone would be integrated on the RAF Harrier aircraft fleet under Capability D of the JUMP programme with a scheduled in-service date of 2009. A Harrier GR9 first flew with 12 Brimstones on 14 February 2007. In late 2009 Brimstone was "nearing completion for integration on the Harrier", but in July 2010 it was reported that this would be postponed until the insensitive-munition version of the missile became available in 2012. Brimstone had not been officially cleared for use on the type when the UK Harriers were withdrawn from service in late 2010.

Following the 2022 Russian invasion of Ukraine, Britain decided to supply Ukraine with Brimstone missiles, however Ukraine did not have a suitable aircraft to launch the system. The UK developed a Wolfram armoured vehicle, based on an extended 6x6 Supacat chassis.

Brimstone 3 features surface-to-surface launch capability. A number of vehicle based launching options have been conceptualised for Brimstone such as ARES, a mission module for Boxer, Challenger 2, Supacat HMT, and a number of UGVs.

== Operational service ==
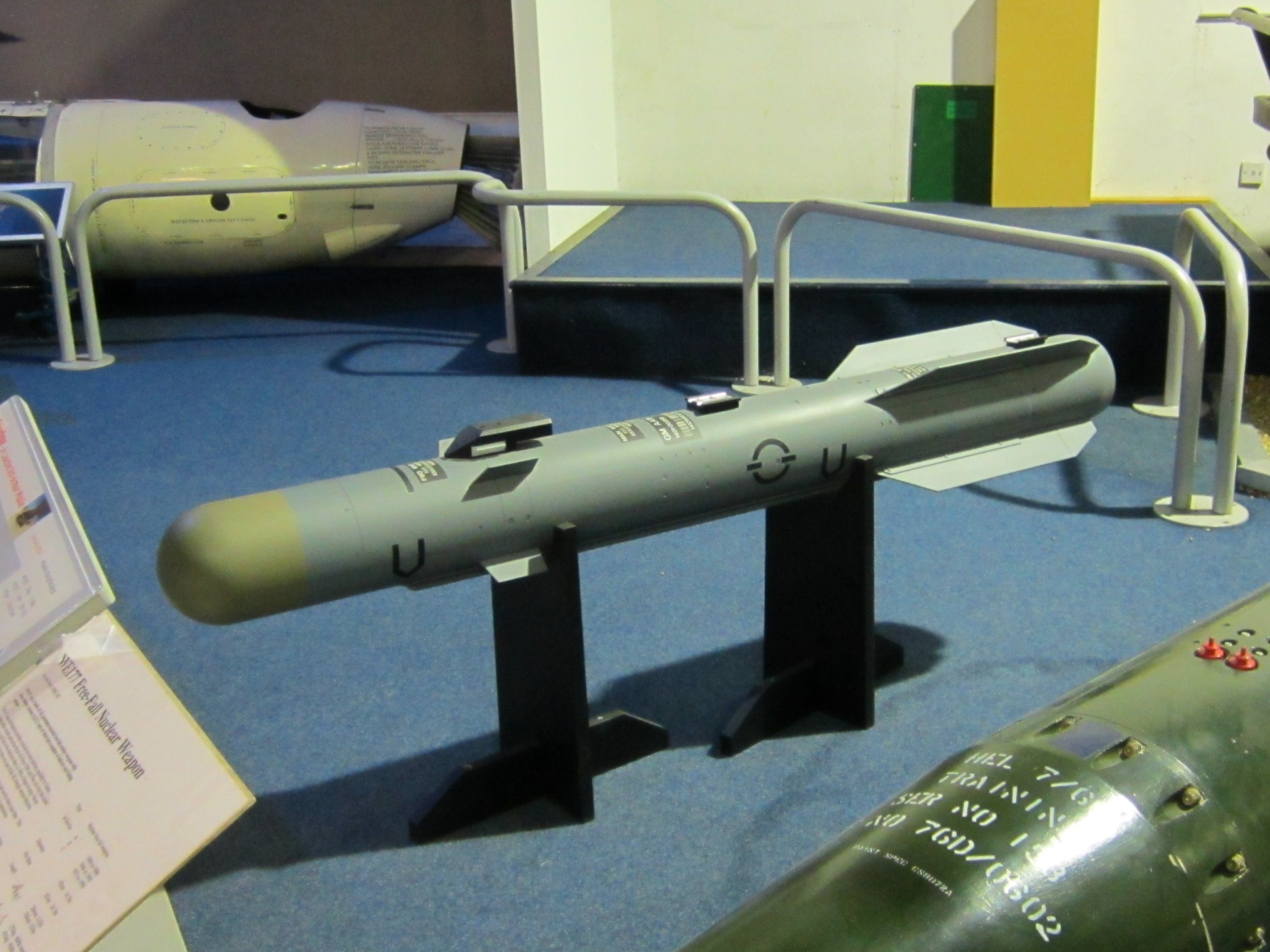
A single-mode Brimstone on display at the RAF Museum London

Operational clearance of the missile was delayed by 12 months due to the unavailability of a Tornado trials aircraft, as the RAF chose instead to rush the development of the Storm Shadow air launched cruise missile ahead of the Iraq war, but another delay of 6 months resulted from redesigning the autopilot for safe release at higher speeds. Over 2,000 missiles were produced.

=== Dual-Mode Brimstone ===
The original Brimstone could not be used in Afghanistan as the rules of engagement required a "man-in-the-loop". Under an Urgent Operational Requirement in 2008, modifications were made to the seeker and software of over 300 existing missiles to create Dual-Mode Brimstone. The new missiles can be laser guided according to the STANAG 3733 standard as well as retaining the millimetre wave seeker; the pilot can select either mode from the cockpit or use both simultaneously. Laser guidance allows specific enemy targets to be picked out in cluttered environments, while the mmW radar ensures accuracy against moving targets.

The development and procurement of the original single-mode missiles cost £370m, a figure inflated by accounting charges relating to the delays. The development of the dual-mode version cost an additional £10m. The Daily Telegraph reported that the dual mode missiles cost £105,000, which is comparable to the cost of the AGM-65 Maverick; the MoD quote only a gross book value of £175,000, which includes development costs as well as the purchase cost of the missile. Upgrading a single-mode missile to dual mode costs between £35,000 and £45,000 plus VAT, depending on quantities ordered.

=== Brimstone 2 (SPEAR 2) ===
In March 2010 Brimstone was selected as the basis for the RAF's requirement under the Selective Precision Effects At Range (SPEAR) Capability 2 Block 1 programme. The Demonstration and Manufacture contract increased the missile's performance "significantly", and converted the warhead and rocket motor to use insensitive munitions. Brimstone 2 has an improved seeker, a more modular design and improvements to airframe and software for "an overall increase in performance with improvements in range and engagement footprint", including a "more than 200% increase" in maximum range. A five-release test campaign in October 2013 culminated in a successful strike against a pickup truck travelling at 70 mph (110 km/h) in a cluttered road environment. Brimstone 2 was planned to enter service on the Tornado in November 2015. It was further updated with an insensitive munition compliant rocket motor and warhead and entered service with the RAF in July 2016 for use on the Tornado GR4. It was also trialled on the Eurofighter Typhoon and AH-64E Apache.

In February 2016, integration trials with the Tornado GR4s saw 11 missiles fired at "[various] structures, a very small fast-moving vehicle, and [targets at the] edge of the weapon system's performance envelope." All in all 10, or 91%, of the 11 missiles were successful; the only missile that missed its target was involved in a very short-range shot in which the missile's semi-active laser homing and millimetric-Wave seekers did not have enough time to effectively acquire its target.

In July 2016, MBDA further proposed a new variant of Brimstone 2 for the AH-64E Apache. It would specifically be for non-armoured targets in land and sea domains, but will not compromise Brimstone's anti-armour capability. It will have a launch aircraft cockpit-selectable trajectory, which will allow line-of-sight engagement (flat trajectory) and high and low missile flight profiles to avoid close-in obstacles; a cockpit-selectable capability that allows the pilot to determine the elevation and impact angle on the target to maximise weapon effect; and a new set of warhead modes, which includes delayed, airburst, impact and proximity fuzing. This weapon will be known as the Future Attack Helicopter Weapon (FAHW).

=== Naval-launched Brimstone Sea SPEAR ===
MBDA tested a maritime variant for use against swarms of small boats named Sea SPEAR. On 25 June 2012 a Tornado GR4 dropped a prototype that hit and sank a 6-metre inflatable boat travelling at 20 kn in sea state 3. On 29 May 2013, MBDA conducted a salvo firing of three millimetric wave operational Brimstone missiles, launched from a fixed offshore platform, against a simulated attack formation of five targets representing FIACs (Fast Inshore Attack Craft). The successful test firing demonstrated Sea SPEAR's ability to strike numerous individual targets. During the test one of the targets, a 15-metre craft, was travelling at 20 knots. MBDA pitted Sea SPEAR against the Raytheon Sea Griffin missile for integration onto American littoral combat ships. The US Navy instead selected the AGM-114L Hellfire as a stop-gap missile for the littoral combat ships.

=== Brimstone 3 ===
In March 2019, MBDA successfully tested the latest Brimstone 3 version in Sweden, now including surface-to-surface firing, plus new hardware allowing future enhancements. The upgrades included a new inertial measurement unit, enhanced autopilot, improved battery for an addition 30% engagement duration and a new improved multi-effect warhead that is insensitive and fully compliant with STANAG 4439.

Brimstone 3 will be integrated onto the RAF's MQ-9B Protector fleet alongside Paveway IV. Spain and Germany intend to use Brimstone 3 on their Eurofighters and the UK intends to use it to replace their already equipped Brimstone 2 stockpile.

Brimstone 3 is also being offered to the British Army as part of MBDA's bid for the Mounted Close Combat Overwatch program which aims to provide an under-armour, non-line-of-sight, anti-armour capability to frontline forces as an overdue capability replacement for Swingfire.

=== SPEAR 3 ===
In 2010, as part of its bid for the RAF's Select Precision Effects At Range (SPEAR) Capability 3 program MBDA proposed, and was later awarded an assessment phase contract for a network-enabled, 100 kg class, standoff missile which reuses technology derived from Brimstone now referred to as SPEAR 3.

=== Land Precision Strike ===
As part of the British Army's Deep Fires Modernisation of its M270 MLRS fleet and the associated 'One launcher, Many Payloads' concepts, the UK is developing a number of new effectors to work alongside its upcoming procurement of GMLRS-ER rockets. One of these effects, Land Precision Strike, under development by MBDA, reuses technology from Brimstone as well as CAMM and aims to create an 80-150km ranged missile for use against fleeting (Moving) targets.

== Operational use ==
=== Royal Air Force ===
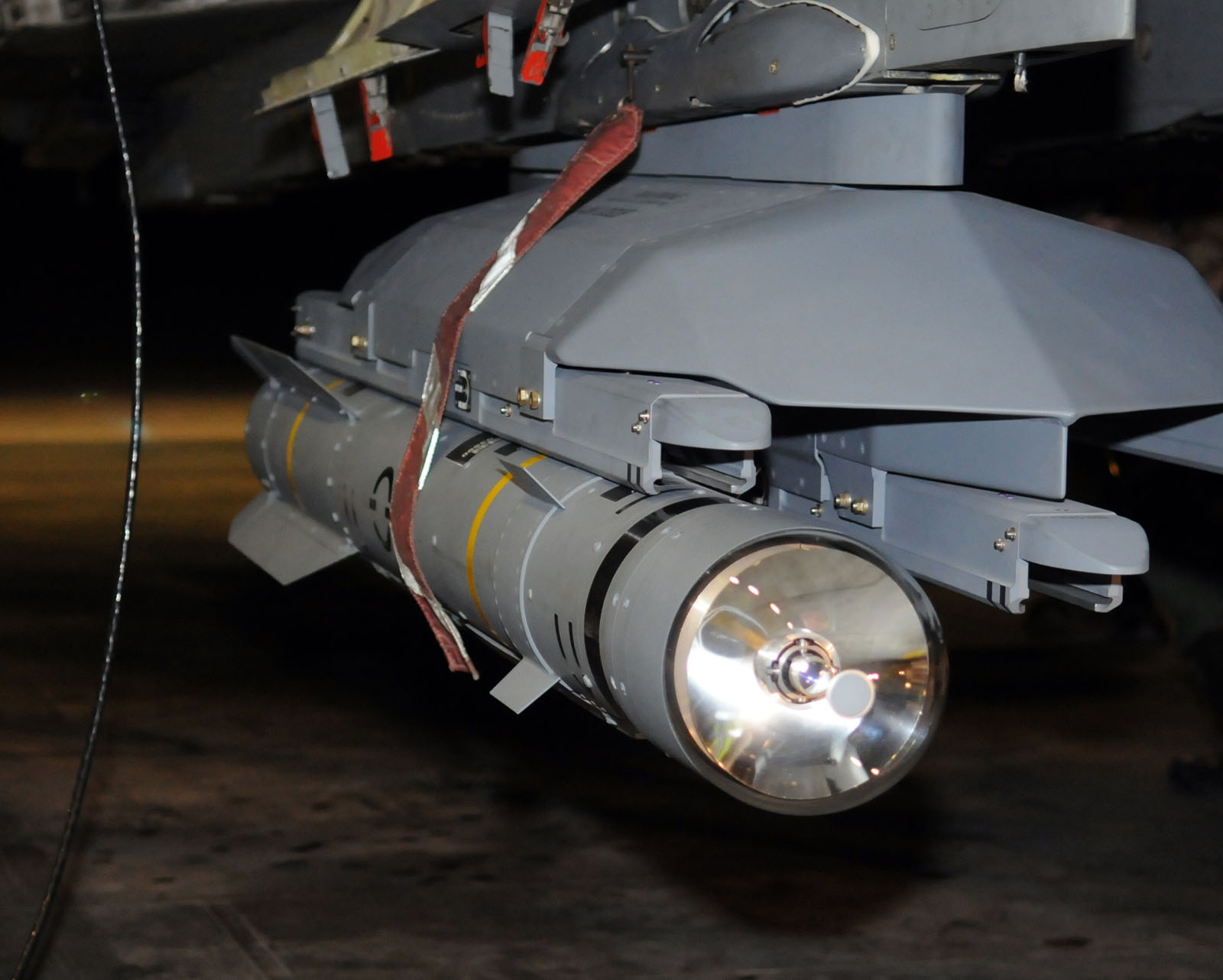
Dual-Mode Brimstone on a Tornado GR4

In March 2005, Brimstone entered service with No. 31 Squadron RAF. Full Operational Capability (FOC) was declared for the Tornado GR4 in December 2005 The first operational sortie of dual-mode Brimstone was over Iraq as part of Operation Telic on 18 December 2008 by a Tornado GR4 of IX(B) Squadron. It was first fired in combat in June 2009, the month in which the Tornado GR4s of 12 Squadron arrived in Afghanistan as part of Operation Herrick.

Brimstone was used during Operation Ellamy over Libya in 2011. Sixty Brimstone were fired in the first four weeks of the Libya campaign, out of 110 Brimstone fired in all operations up to that time. This prompted the MoD to ask MBDA to convert more missiles to the dual-mode version. 150 dual-mode missiles had been ordered in December 2010, but according to the Royal United Services Institute, stocks of usable dual-mode missiles fell to single figures at one stage of the Libya campaign. The 500th dual-mode Brimstone was delivered in March 2012, at which time over 200 had been fired in combat. The single-mode missile was not fired in combat until 15 September 2011 when a pair of RAF Tornado GR4 of IX(B) Squadron fired 22 missiles (including a salvo of 12 by one aircraft) against an armoured column near Sebha/Sabha, 400 miles south of Tripoli.

In September 2014, Tornado GR4 strike aircraft of No. 2 Squadron RAF began flying armed sorties over Iraq in support of Operation Shader, the UK's contribution to the Military intervention against the Islamic State of Iraq and the Levant. On September 30, the aircraft flew their first bombing raids, engaging a heavy artillery position with a Paveway IV laser-guided bomb, and an armed pickup truck with a Brimstone air-to-ground missile. Brimstone is the preferred weapon for these kinds of targets due to its effectiveness against moving targets. In December 2015, the UK started using Brimstone missiles in Syria. By March 2017, the RAF had used 97 missiles in Iraq and 73 in Syria.

=== Export sales ===
Around £10 million of Brimstones from the RAF stock were sold to the Royal Saudi Air Force for use on its Tornados. In April 2011, the RAF's Assistant Chief of the Air Staff Air Vice-Marshal Baz North reported that the missiles were "being sought by both the United States of America and the French" in the light of Brimstone's success in Libya. France's DGA procurement agency held meetings in late May 2011 to discuss a lightweight air-to-surface weapon for the Dassault Rafale aircraft; Stéphane Reb of the DGA would merely say that "Brimstone is a solution, but it's not the only option". In early 2014 the US Congress' House Armed Services Committee showed interest again in the missile; high-ranking members of the US armed services have stated they "like it". The French Air Force were still thinking about a purchase in March 2012, with a prime consideration being lower collateral damage compared to the AASM missile. India made a request for information about integrating Brimstone on their Sukhoi Su-30MKI fighter fleet. In July 2014, it was revealed that the United States Navy was studying the Dual Mode Brimstone for use on the Boeing F/A-18E/F Super Hornet aircraft. The United States Army also considered the Brimstone as "an option" in its Joint Air-to-Ground Missile (JAGM) program, but selected Lockheed Martin's dual-mode seeker upgrade for the Hellfire missile. In September 2015, MBDA displayed the dual-mode Brimstone for the first time as a helicopter-mounted weapon to fulfill the British Army Air Corps' need for a future attack helicopter weapon for the AgustaWestland Apache. In January 2016, it was reported that Germany was considering arming its newly leased Heron TP drones with Brimstone. In March 2016, France was reportedly considering Brimstone for its Tiger attack helicopters.

In December 2017 it was announced that Qatar had purchased Brimstone missiles to arm its Eurofighter Typhoon fighter aircraft. In September 2019, MBDA was reportedly partnering with the Polish defence firm PGZ to produce a Brimstone carrying missile tank destroyer. The two proposed variants consist of one vehicle based on a modernised BMP-1 infantry fighting vehicle chassis, carrying a launch module of 12 missiles. The other is based on the K9 Thunder howitzer chassis, featuring three launch modules of eight missiles each.

In May 2022 MBDA and the Polish Armaments Group announced that Brimstone would arm the latter's upcoming tank destroyer.

In June 2024, it was reported that Germany had decided to purchase 3,266 Brimstone 3 missiles for its Eurofighter Typhoon aircraft.

==== Russo-Ukrainian War ====
In April 2022, the UK Ministry of Defence supplied Brimstones to the Ukrainian Armed Forces for use as a surface-launched ground-attack system to strike Russian ground forces. By 12 May 2022, training on a surface-launch system was happening in Ukraine. On 17 May 2022, it was claimed that ground-launched Brimstone missiles had destroyed two Russian targets. It is claimed that these two targets are Russian tanks, operating behind their lines, and the missiles were fired by Ukrainian soldiers. If correct, it would be the first time a surface-launched Brimstone missile has destroyed a target.

On 22 November 2022, the UK has started supplying Brimstone 2 missiles to the Armed Forces of Ukraine. Brought into service in 2016 it has double the range of the first Brimstone. It has an inertial navigation system and can get to an area on autopilot before choosing targets autonomously. However it is still being fired by trucks which reduce its range compared to air launched versions since a ground launched missile lacks "an aircraft's speed and altitude" - as a converted multiple rocket launcher system. A number of Wolfram vehicles, based on an extended 6x6 Supacat chassis with an 8 pack Brimstone MLRS launcher, were delivered to the AFU in 2023.

On August 23, 2023, a Brimstone-2 missile fired from a Ukrainian boat destroyed a Russian S-400 missile site in Cape Tarkhankut in western Crimea.

On July 7, 2024 the Defence Secretary John Healey from newly elected government of UK, said the UK would provide nearly 100 precision Brimstone missiles

== Operators ==
Operators Current Future

=== Current operators ===
Saudi Arabia
- Royal Saudi Air Force
United Kingdom
- Royal Air Force
Germany
- Luftwaffe
Ukraine
- Armed Forces of Ukraine

=== Future operators ===
Belgium
- Belgian Air Force - To arm their MQ-9B Skyguardian drones, Belgium ordered a batch of missiles in 2025, with delivery expected in 2027.
Qatar
- Qatar Emiri Air Force
Poland
- Polish Land Forces — 130 missiles ordered in 2022 to be fitted on the upcoming Ottokar Brzoza tank destroyer platform as part of an agreement including local production by the Polska Grupa Zbrojeniowa. Deliveries are planned by 2025.
Spain
- Spanish Air Force
Turkey
- Turkish Air Force

=== Potential operators ===
South Korea
- Republic of Korea Air Force - On 20 November 2023, MBDA and Korean Aerospace Industries (KAI) formalised an agreement to improve collaboration of weapons integration on to the KAI KF-21 Boramae and KAI T-50 Golden Eagle. As part of this agreement, both parties are also exploring the integration of additional weapons, including Brimstone, onto both platforms as well as joint export.

== See also ==
- AGM-114 Hellfire – (United States)
- AGM-169 Joint Common Missile – (United States)
- AGM-179 JAGM – (United States)
- PARS 3 LR – (Germany)
- Nimrod – (Israel)
- UMTAS – (Turkey)
- Barq – (Pakistan)
- 9K121 Vikhr – (Soviet Union)
- Mokopa – (South Africa)
- Helina – (India)

== Sources ==
- Eklund, Dylan (2006). "Fire and Brimstone: The RAF's 21st Century Missiles". RAF Magazine. pp. 19–25.
