= MBB SE =

- ISIN: DE000A0ETBQ4

MBB SE is a family-run mid sized group of companies, headquartered in Berlin. The company name derives from a former subsidiary MBB Gelma Industrieelektronik GmbH, taken over in 1997 from Daimler-Benz Aerospace AG.

== History ==
The company was founded in 1995 as Nesemeier & Freimuth GmbH. It purchased MBB Gelma Industrieelektronik GmbH from Daimler-Benz Aerospace AG. MBB Industries AG had its IPO in 2006 and was converted into MBB SE (Societas Europaea) in March 2015. MBB stands for Messerschmitt-Bölkow-Blohm. Today, MBB is the only independent company to have emerged directly from the original MBB Group. The company founders remained major shareholders also after the IPO to date.

Today, the group includes seven subsidiaries with more than 1,500 employees.

== Company figures ==
MBB group revenues in 2015 are approx. 270 million US-$. For 2020 MBB is planning with more than 500 million US-$ while keeping up an EBITDA margin of 10%.

== MBB subsidiaries ==
- Delignit AG (since 2003)
- OBO Werke GmbH & Co. KG (since 2003)
- Hanke Tissue Spolka z o.o. (since 2006)
- DTS IT AG (since 2008)
- CT Formpolster GmbH (since 2010)
- Aumann AG (since 2012)
- 60% Friedrich Vorwerk KG (GmbH & Co.)
