= Schrobenhausen =

- Town
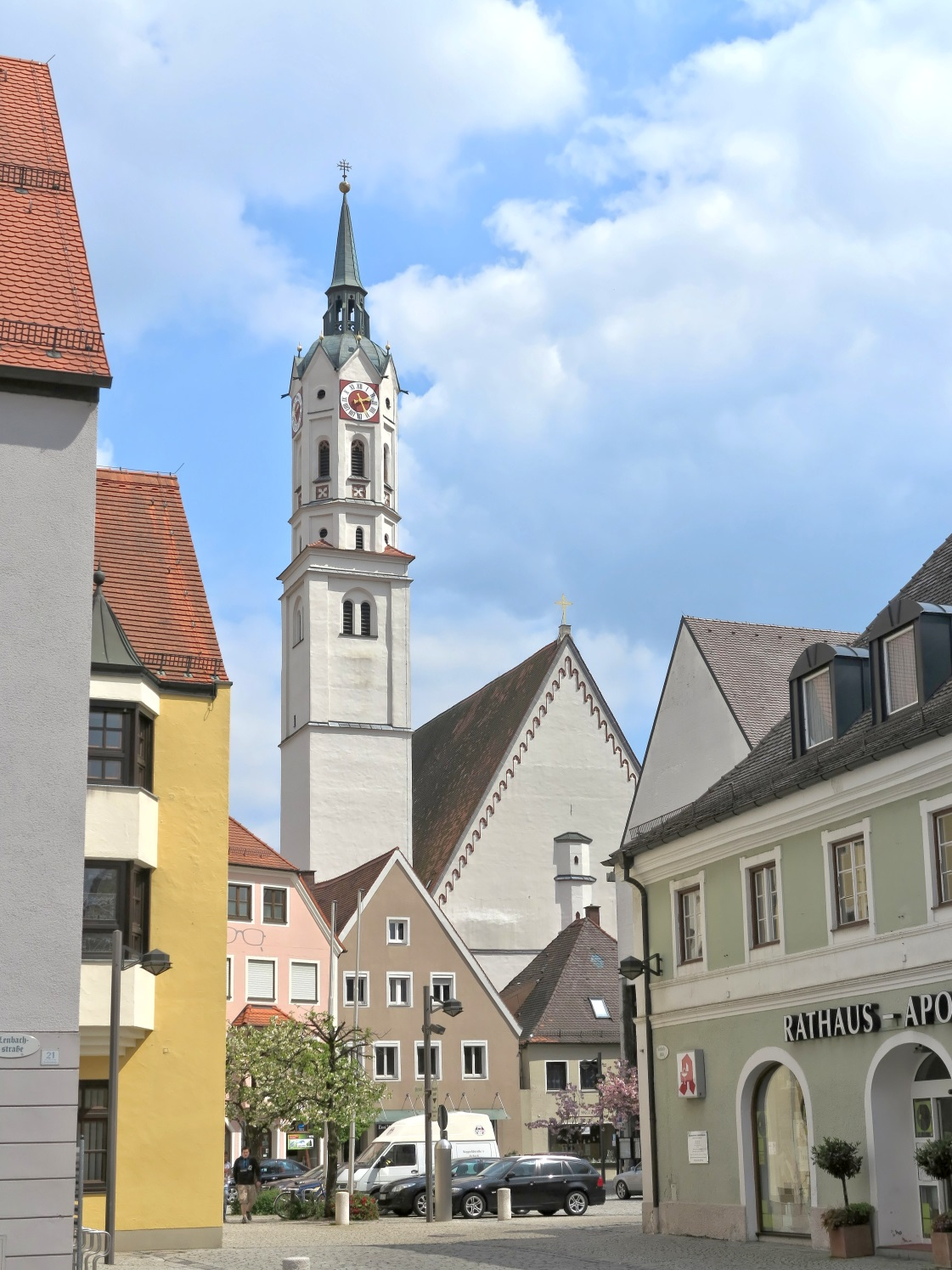
- Church of Saint James

- Coat of arms

- Location of Schrobenhausen within Neuburg-Schrobenhausen district
- Interactive map of Schrobenhausen
- Location within Germany Location within Bavaria
- Coordinates: 48°32′N 11°16′E
- Country: Germany
- State: Bavaria
- Admin. region: Oberbayern
- District: Neuburg-Schrobenhausen

Government
  - Mayor (2020–26): Harald Reisner

Area
  - Total: 75.26 km^{2} (29.06 sq mi)
- Elevation: 409 m (1,342 ft)

Population (2025-12-31)
  - Total: 17,916
  - Density: 238.1/km^{2} (616.6/sq mi)
- Time zone: UTC+01:00 (CET)
  - Summer (DST): UTC+02:00 (CEST)
- Postal codes: 86529
- Dialling codes: 08252
- Vehicle registration: ND, SOB
- Website: www.schrobenhausen.de

Schrobenhausen (German pronunciation: [ʃʁoːbn̩ˈhaʊzn̩]; Central Bavarian: Schrobenhausn) is a town in the district of Neuburg-Schrobenhausen in Bavaria, Germany. It is situated on the River Paar approx. 25 kilometres (16 miles) south-west of Ingolstadt and 35 kilometres (22 miles) north-east of Augsburg.

== History ==
Remains of ancient settlements in the area can be traced as far back as the Bronze Age.

The name “Scropinhusen” appeared for the first time in church books around the year 790 AD.

In the 10th century, the small settlement was devastated during the Hungarian invasions and was not mentioned in any documents for more than 100 years. The town was once again completely destroyed in a war in 1388.

Schrobenhausen flourished in the 15th century.

Due to its location on the important road between the imperial cities of Augsburg and Regensburg, Schrobenhausen was often affected by military armies. During the Thirty Years' War, the area was in the front line between the Swedish army and General Wallenstein's imperial army for several months in 1632 and 1633.

In the second half of the 19th century, paper and metal processing companies emerged in Schrobenhausen.

During the Second World War, chemicals for explosives was manufactured in the city. Many of the workers were forced laborers.

== Industry and agriculture ==
After the war, Schrobenhausen developed into a medium-sized center. The city's very good infrastructure have enabled positive development in recent years, so that the city has become an interesting location for companies, such as the major construction company Bauer AG.

The town hosts notable German arms manufacturers like MBDA and TDW.

Schrobenhausen is also famous for its rich harvest of white asparagus in April/May/June.

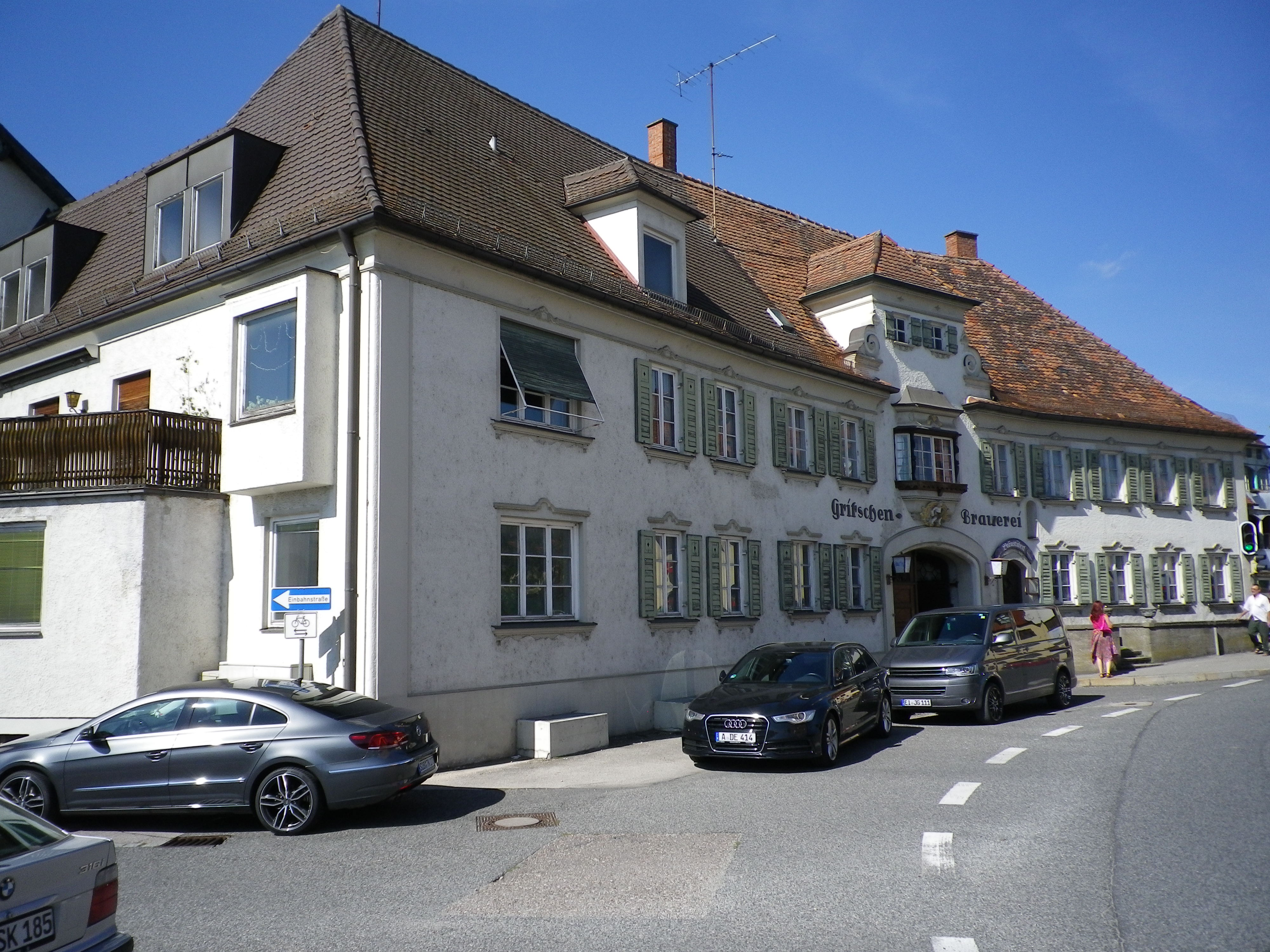
Gritschen Brewery, Founded in 1593. Closed in 2009. Building remains under historical protection.

== International relations ==
=== Twin towns ===
Schrobenhausen is twinned with

- Thiers, France
- Bridgnorth, England (since 1992)
- Perg, Austria (since 1989)

=== Famous citizens ===
- Franz von Lenbach (1836–1904), painter, born in Schrobenhausen
- Joseph Sattler (1867–1931), graphic artist, born in Schrobenhausen
- Friedl Rinder (1905–2001), German chess master, born in Schrobenhausen
- Hubert Fichte (1935–1986), author. Lived in Steingriff as a child in 1941, then in Schrobenhausen from 1942 to 1943
- Walter Mixa (born in 1941), pastor from Schrobenhausen (1975–1996), Bishop of Eichstätt (1996–2005) and of Augsburg (2005–2010)
- Marion Schick, née Pilnei (born in 1958), former President of the University of Applied Sciences in Munich | Fachhochschule München, former Minister of Culture, Youth and Sports of the State of Baden-Württemberg
