= AS.34 Kormoran =

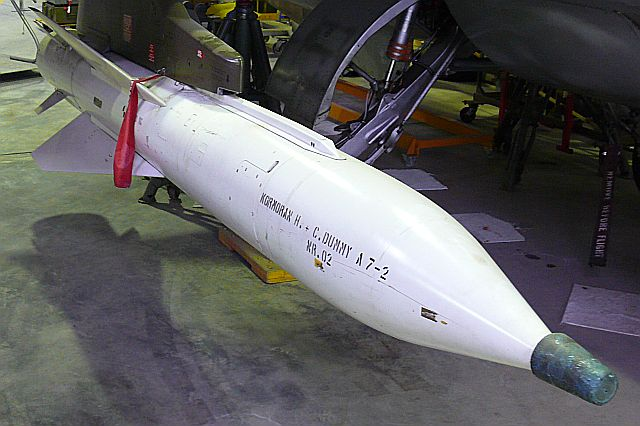
- Type: Medium-range, active radar homing air-to-surface missile
- Place of origin: Germany

Service history
- Used by: Germany, Italy

Production history
- Manufacturer: EADS
- Produced: Kormoran 1: 1973; Kormoran 2: 1991
- Variants: Kormoran 1 Kormoran 2

Specifications
- Mass: 600 kg/630 kg
- Length: 4.40 m
- Diameter: 344 mm
- Warhead: 165 kg/220 kg
- Engine: solid-propellant rocket motor
- Operational range: 23 km/35 km
- Maximum speed: Mach 1-2
- Guidance system: INS/active radar
- Launch platform: Aircraft: F-104G Starfighter; Tornado IDS

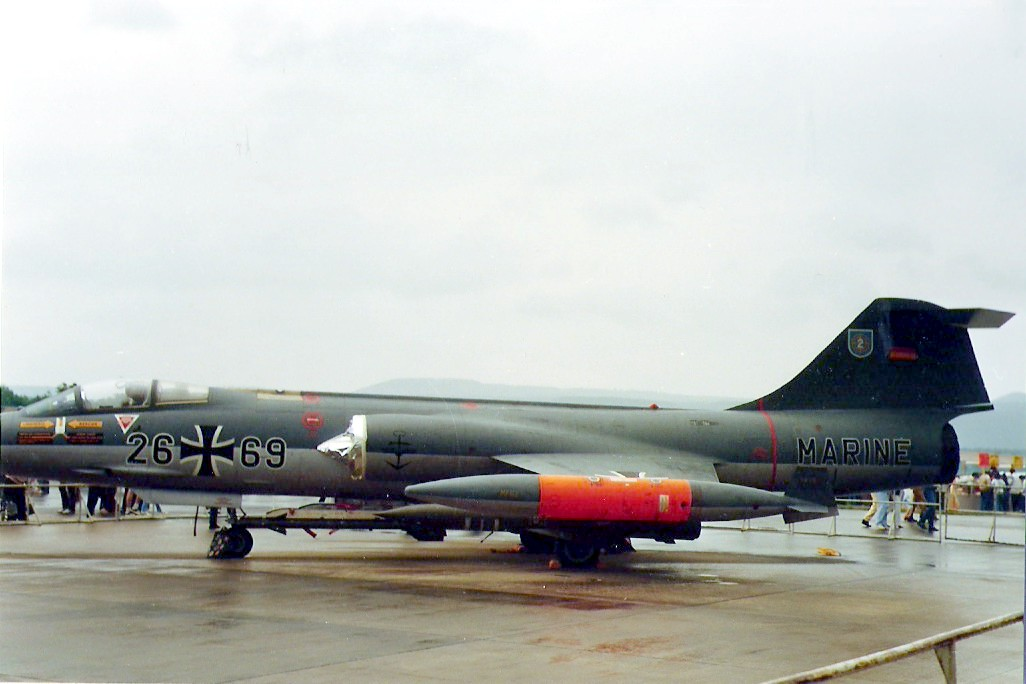
Kormoran 1 on a German Navy F-104G in 1984

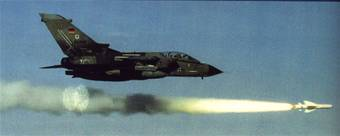
A German Tornado IDS launching a Kormoran

The AS.34 Kormoran (cormorant) is a German-produced anti-ship missile. The Kormoran uses an inertial guidance system for the midcourse phase, switching to active radar homing during the terminal attack phase. It carries a 165 kg (363 lb) delay-fused warhead, designed for 90mm of penetration prior to detonation. The maximum range is 23 km (~14 miles).

== Design and development ==
Development of the Kormoran started in 1962, being taken over by Messerschmitt-Bölkow-Blohm (now a part of EADS) in 1967. The missile was originally designed for anti-shipping roles in coastal waters, although it retains a secondary land-attack capability as well. It was deployed on the Panavia Tornado. 350 Kormoran 1s were produced.

The AS.34 Kormoran 2 is an improved version of the AS.34 Kormoran 1. Development was started in 1983, with first flight and firing trials taking place in early 1986. The missile features an improved warhead, all-digital electronics, improved active radar seeker, increased ECM-resistance, a stronger booster rocket, a longer range, improved automated target selection, multiple launch capability, and an increased resistance to countermeasures.

While still using the same basic airframe as Kormoran 1, the Kormoran 2 has a greater range of 35 km (21.7 miles) and a heavier 220 kg (485 lb) warhead.

Testing ended in 1987, and the missile entered service with the German Navy in 1991. Approximately 140 missiles were produced for Germany.

== Operators ==
Germany
Italy

== Specifications ==
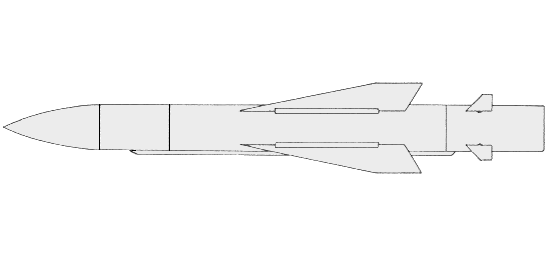
Profile of the AS34 Kormoran 2.

- Name: AS.34 Kormoran 1/2
- Weight: 600/630 kg
- Length: 4,40 m
- Range: 23/35 km
- Warhead: 165/220 kg
- Guidance: INS/active radar homing
