= AfriStar =

Satellite

- Mission type: Communications
- Operator: Worldspace
- COSPAR ID: 1998-063A
- SATCAT no.: 25515
- Website: http://www.yazmi.com/
- Mission duration: 12 years (planned); 15 years (maneuver life)

Spacecraft properties
- Bus: Eurostar E2000+
- Manufacturer: EADS Astrium and Alcatel Space

Start of mission
- Launch date: 28 October 1998, 22:16:00 UTC
- Rocket: Ariane 44L
- Launch site: Centre Spatial Guyanais, ELA-2
- Contractor: Arianespace

End of mission
- Last contact: 6 January 2018

Orbital parameters
- Reference system: Geocentric
- Regime: Geostationary
- Longitude: 21.0° East
- Epoch: 28 October 1998

AfriStar (sometimes known as AfriStar 1) is a satellite formerly owned and operated by the company 1worldspace (formerly known as WorldStar) and now owned and operated by Yazmi USA. The satellite was built by EADS Astrium (formerly known as Matra Marconi Space) and Alcatel Space. Based on Astrium's Eurostar E2000+ bus design, the geostationary orbit satellite broadcast digital radio programs in the L-Band frequency (1452–1492 MHz range).

== Launch ==
Afristar was launched on 28 October 1998 at 22:16:00 UTC, by an Ariane 44L launch vehicle (V-113) from the Centre Spatial Guyanais, at Kourou, since the pad ELA-2. AfriStar was the first WorldSpace satellite. It broadcast digital radio over Africa and the Middle East. Small handheld radios were able to pick up the transmissions from its three L-band beams, each beam covering approximately 14 million km^{2} on the Earth. The satellite carried from 24 to 96 radio channels with on-board processing to allow variable bit rates from mono to CD audio quality transmission. The broadcasters send their programs up to the satellite with a small X-band ground station.

The satellites had a design life of 12 years, with an orbital maneuver life of 15 years, which means that each satellite has been designed and fueled to maintain its assigned orbital position (within 0.1°) for 15 years. After that point, the satellite must be decommissioned. The AfriStar satellite developed a defect in its solar panels. As a result of this defect, the energy collected by those panels was less than intended. In March 2010, WorldStar announced that it was considering disposing of its satellites by boosting them to a higher orbit and expending their remaining fuel.

It was repurposed in 2010 for Samara's Yazmi online education company and then sold on in 2017 to CMMB/Hong Kong's Silkwave broadcasting operator, now part of CMMB Vision. On 6 January 2018, the Afristar satellite's orbit was raised to the GEO graveyard. The satellite was retired after 20 years service at the 21.0° East location.

== Sister satellites ==
The AfriStar satellite has a sister satellite, AsiaStar satellite, an exact copy, built by the same companies, formerly owned and operated by 1worldspace and now owned and operated by Yazmi USA.

In addition to AfriStar and AsiaStar, another similar satellite was built by the same companies for 1worldspace. This satellite was known as AmeriStar (originally CaribStar) and was purposed to serve South America, Latin America, and the Caribbean from 95.0° West. The satellite was however not launched as the L-band frequencies used by 1worldspace are commandeered by the United States Air Force. This satellite was reconfigured and was since known as AfriStar 2. AfriStar 2 was to be launched to 21.0° East in August 2007. This launch did not happen. This satellite was intended to expand coverage for Western Europe in addition to the existing coverage of AfriStar 1, which it would have eventually replaced. 1worldspace would have used ETSI Satellite Digital Radio (SDR) open standard in the new European coverage beam.

The AfriStar 2 (AmeriStar, CaribStar) satellite was never launched, although its build was completed. Its last known status was in storage at EADS Astrium's and Thales Alenia Space facilities in Toulouse, France and Stevenage, U.K.

Another satellite of identical design (known as WorldStar 4), for which long lead parts had been procured and partially assembled, was at one point also maintained in storage in Toulouse, France. The intention was to have this satellite integrated and tested for a future launch in an abbreviated period of time. This satellite was never completed, and its components have since been cannibalized to other projects.

== Gallery ==
1worldspace's AfriStar control center in Washington, D.C.

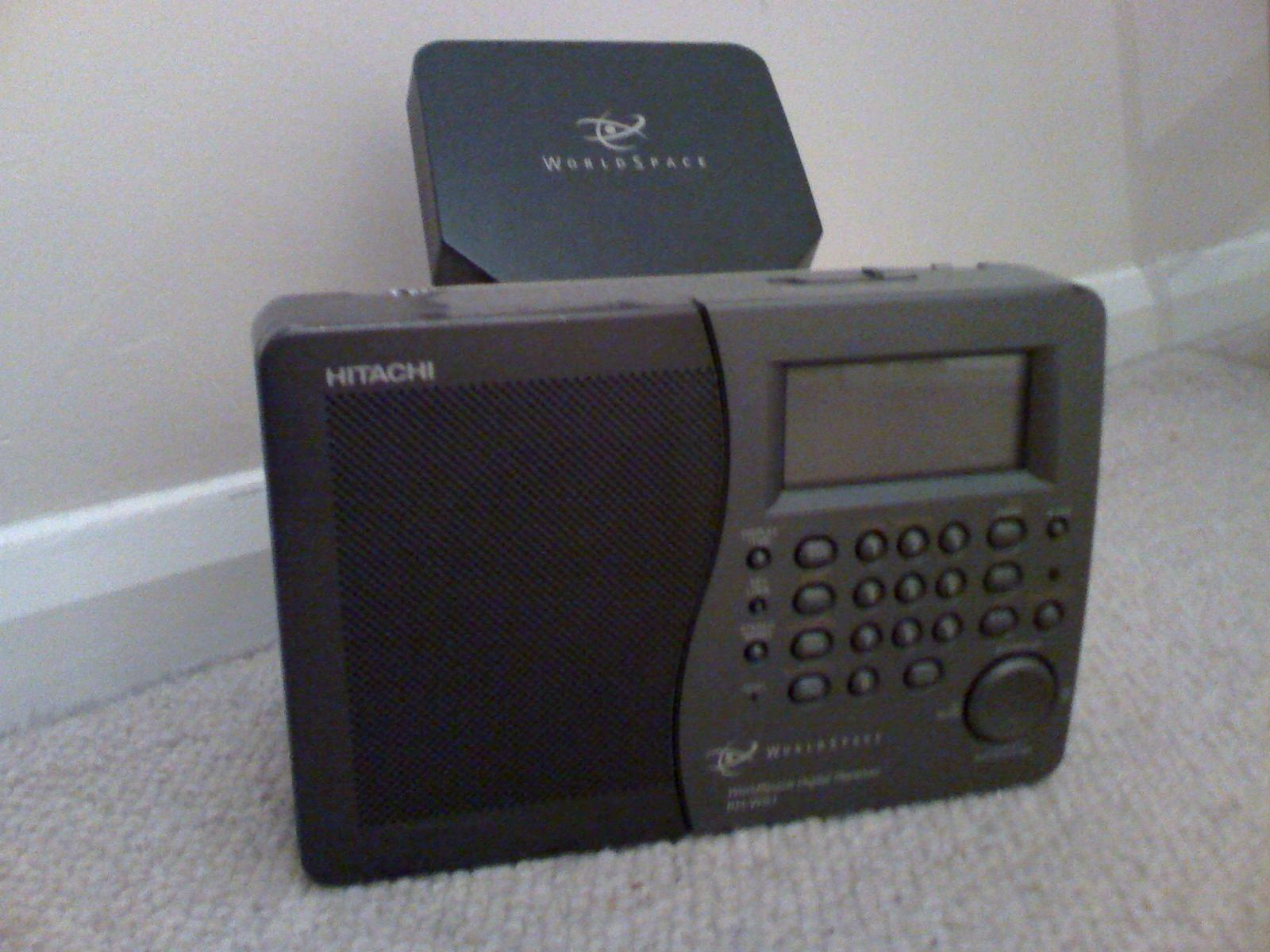
Original Hitachi 1worldspace receiver

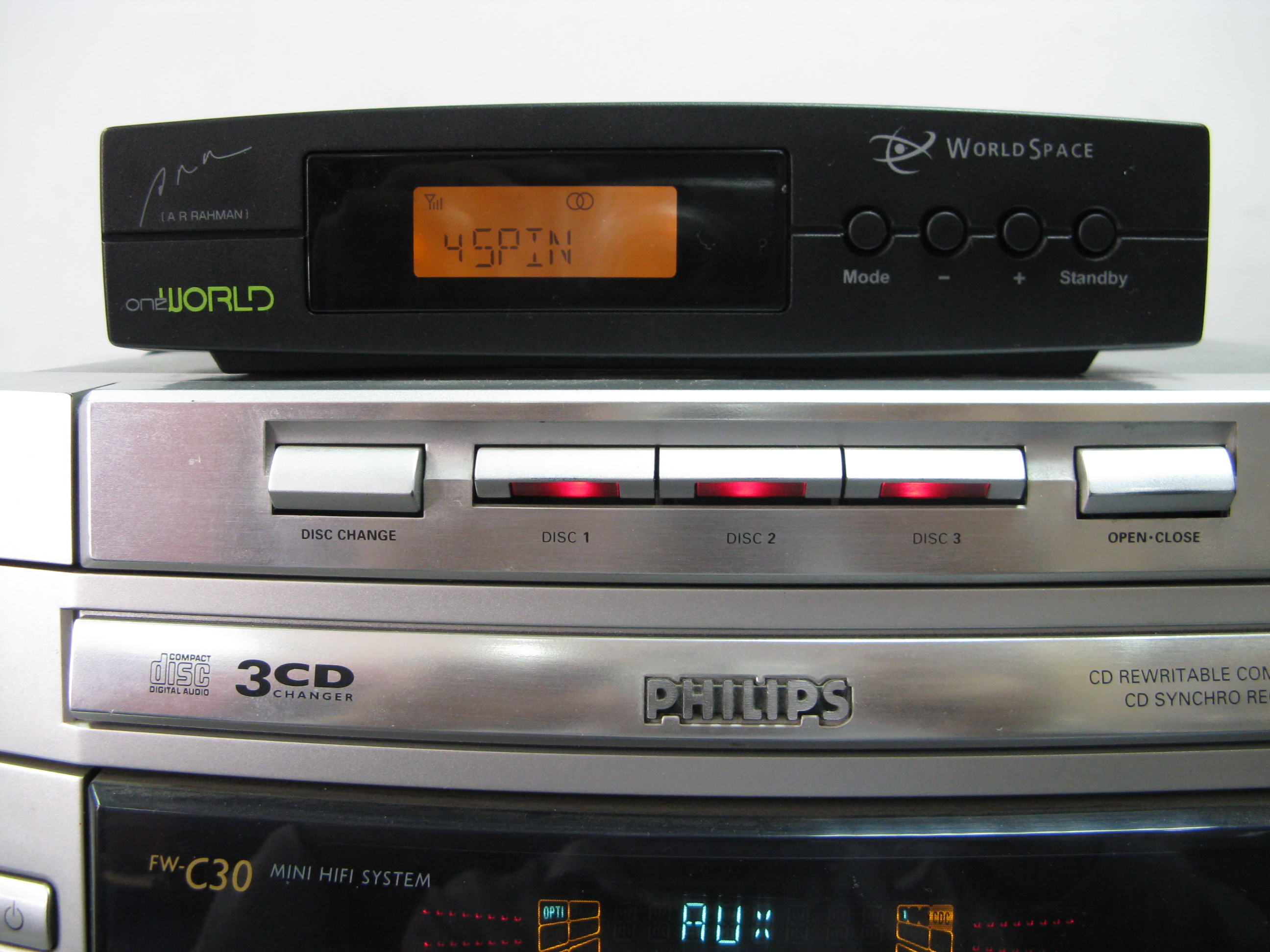
A BPL 1worldspace receiver on a Stereo System

== See also ==
- 1worldspace
- AsiaStar
- Satellite
