= INSAT-3B =

Indian communications satellite

- Mission type: Communication
- Operator: INSAT
- COSPAR ID: 2000-016B
- SATCAT no.: 26108
- Mission duration: 12 years

Spacecraft properties
- Bus: I-2K
- Manufacturer: ISRO
- Launch mass: 2,070 kilograms (4,560 lb)
- Power: 1,712 watts

Start of mission
- Launch date: 21 March 2000
- Rocket: Ariane 5G
- Launch site: Kourou ELA-3
- Contractor: Arianespace

Orbital parameters
- Reference system: Geocentric
- Regime: Geostationary
- Longitude: 83° East
- Perigee altitude: 35,743 kilometres (22,210 mi)
- Apogee altitude: 35,829 kilometres (22,263 mi)
- Inclination: 0.01 degrees
- Period: 1,436.06 minutes
- Epoch: 23 April 2000

INSAT-3B is an Indian communications satellite which was built by the Indian Space Research Organisation and operated by Indian National Satellite System. It is the first Geostationary satellite by India.

== Overview ==
INSAT–3B is the first satellite built under INSAT–3 series of satellites to join INSAT system. It is based on the I-2000 satellite bus. This satellite primarily serves to business communication, mobile communication and developmental communication.it provides the first set to transponders for Swaran Jayanti Vidya Vikas Antariksh Upagraha Yojana (Vidya Vahini) for interactive training and developmental communication. It is a 3 – axis body stabilized in orbit using momentum and reaction wheels, solar flaps, magnetic torquers and eight 10 N and eight 22 N reaction control thrusters.

Its propulsion system consists of 440 N Liquid Apogee Motor MON-3 (Mixed Oxides of Nitrogen) and MMH (MonoMethylHydrazine) for orbit raising.

== Launch ==
Insat-3B was launched on the 128th flight of European launch vehicle, Ariane of Arianespace, on 21 March 2000, at 23:28 UTC from ELA-3 at Kourou in French Guiana along with its co-passenger, a broadcast satellite, AsiaStar, belonging to a US company, WorldSpace.

== Payload ==
- 12 extended C-Band Transponders each having a bandwidth of 36 MHz with power of 15 W
- Five Ku-band Transponders providing three channels, having a bandwidth of 77/72 MHz with power of 55W
- Mobile Satellite Services (MSS) operating in C/S band frequencies
