= MBDA =

European developer and manufacturer of missiles

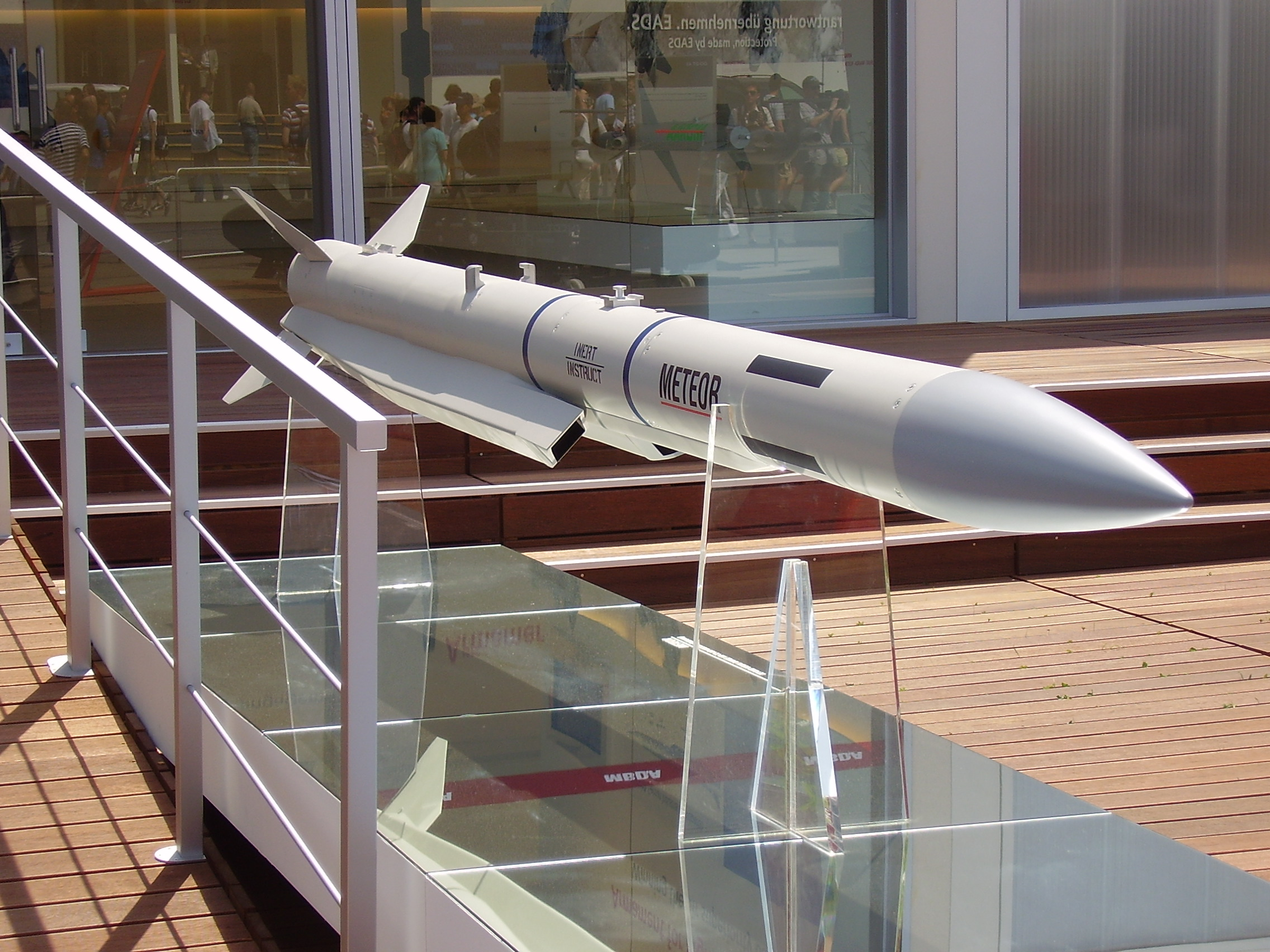
- Type: Joint venture
- Industry: Defence
- Founded: December 2001; 24 years ago
- Headquarters: Le Plessis-Robinson n. Paris, France
- Key people: Éric Béranger (CEO)
- Products: Missiles, missiles systems, countermeasures, countermining
- Revenue: ▲€5.8 billion (2025)
- Owners: Airbus (37.5%); BAE Systems (37.5%); Leonardo (25%)
- Number of employees: 13,000
- Divisions: MBDA France; MBDA UK; MBDA Italy; MBDA Germany; MBDA Spain
- Subsidiaries: Matra Electronique; GDI Simulation; Bayern-Chemie; TDW; MBDA Inc.
- Website: mbda-systems.com

MBDA is a European multinational corporation specialized in the design, development and manufacturing of missiles and related systems. Headquartered in Le Plessis-Robinson near Paris, France, the company was founded in December 2001 via the merger of three of the most prominent European missile systems companies: the French Aérospatiale Matra Missiles, the Anglo-French Matra BAe Dynamics and the missile division of the Anglo-Italian Alenia Marconi Systems. These businesses were subsidiaries of EADS (now called Airbus), BAE Systems and Finmeccanica (now Leonardo), and all three remain MBDA's parent companies.

MBDA employs around 13,000 people worldwide as of 2023 and, despite being an integrated company, has maintained national divisions since its creation: MBDA France (over 6,000 employees), MBDA UK (over 4,000) and MBDA Italy (1,852). They were formed by simply grouping in their respective countries the assets and activities of the various French, British and Italian businesses that had merged to create MBDA.

In March 2006, LFK-Lenkflugkörpersysteme GmbH, the German missile subsidiary of EADS, was acquired by MBDA and in 2010, an office was opened in Madrid, Spain, leading to the formation of two additional national divisions: MBDA Germany (1,200 employees) and MBDA Spain (38).

In 2023, MBDA generated €4.5 billion in revenue. It works with over 90 armed forces worldwide and also has a number of subsidiaries, including one in the United States, MBDA Inc (50 employees).

== History ==
The consolidation within Europe's missile industry began in 1996 when half of the missile business of Matra Hautes Technologies (the Matra conglomerate's aerospace, defence and telecommunications division) merged with the missile activities of BAe Dynamics (itself a division of British Aerospace) to form the 50/50 joint venture Matra BAe Dynamics (MBD). MBDA is an example of where joint venture (JV) formation has been adopted within the European defence industry to facilitate international collaboration.

Three years later, the other half of Matra Hautes Technologies's missile business (Matra Missiles) and Aérospatiale's missile systems division were consolidated to form Aérospatiale Matra Missiles (AMM) following the merger between Aérospatiale and Matra Hautes Technologies in 1999. As a result of these developments, the new French corporation, Aérospatiale-Matra, not only had AAM as its wholly owned missile division but also now held Matra's 50% stake in MBD. In 2000, Aérospatiale-Matra merged with Germany's DASA and Spain's CASA to form the European Aeronautic Defence and Space or EADS (now rebranded Airbus); the latter thus gained ownership of all of Aérospatiale-Matra's assets, including its stakes in joint ventures; which is how Airbus came to be one of MBDA's three parent companies.

In 1998, GEC-Marconi Radar and Defence Systems (a subsidiary of GEC-Marconi) and Alenia Difesa (a subsidiary of Finmeccanica) combined their missile and radar activities to form the 50/50 joint venture Alenia Marconi Systems (AMS). In 1999, British Aerospace purchased and merged with GEC-Marconi to form BAE Systems. Thus the newly formed BAE Systems gained ownership of both BAe Dynamics' 50% stake in Matra BAe Dynamics and GEC-Marconi Radar and Defence Systems' 50% stake in Alenia Marconi Systems; while Alenia Difesa's 50% stake in the latter remained under the ownership of Finmeccanica, which would later be rebranded Leonardo.

In December 2001, AAM, MBD and the missile systems activities of AMS merged, thus founding MBDA. In March 2006, LFK-Lenkflugkörpersysteme GmbH (LFK), the German missile subsidiary of EADS, was acquired by MBDA. On 9 May 2012, it was rebranded MBDA Deutschland GmbH. Together with its subsidiaries TDW and Bayern-Chemie, it forms MBDA Germany. Since February 2002, MBDA has owned 40% of Inmize Sistemas S.L., a Spanish company that was formed to integrate the experience and technology of the major Spanish defence companies in the guided weapons sector. An office was opened in the country in 2010 to manage its local activities. As AMS had R&D assets located in California, MBDA also possess facilities in the United States, choosing to operate in the country via a wholly owned subsidiary called MBDA Inc. In December 2011, MBDA Inc acquired the Viper Strike activity of Northrop Grumman in Huntsville, Alabama.

In April 2026, MBDA announced that it was assisting the Ukrainian company Fire Point in developing missiles.

== Structure of the MBDA Group ==
=== MBDA sites ===
- MBDA in France
  - Le Plessis-Robinson (MBDA Group headquarters)
  - Bourges Subdray
  - Bourges Aéroport
  - Selles-Saint-Denis
- MBDA in Germany
  - Schrobenhausen (MBDA Deutschland headquarters)
  - Aschau am Inn
  - Freienhausen (test center)
  - Hermeskeil
  - Ulm
- MBDA in Italy
  - La Spezia
  - Rome
  - Fusaro
- MBDA in the UK
  - Stevenage, Hertfordshire (MBDA UK headquarters)
  - Filton, Bristol
  - Bolton, Greater Manchester
- MBDA Inc. in the USA
  - Westlake Village, California
  - Washington, DC
  - Huntsville, Alabama

=== MBDA subsidiaries ===
- MBDA Deutschland GmbH
  - TDW GmbH
  - Bayern-Chemie
- MBDA France and MBDA UK
  - Roxel
- MBDA
  - Inmize Sistemas (MBDA is a partial owner)

=== Joint ventures ===
- With European companies
  - Eurosam: JV comprising MBDA France, MBDA Italy and Thales.
  - MBDA Deutschland and Rheinmetall Waffe Munition.
  - RAM-System GmbH (RAMSYS): JV comprising MBDA Deutschland and Diehl Defence.
  - TAURUS Systems GmbH: JV comprising MBDA Deutschland and Saab.
- With American companies
  - COMLOG: JV comprising MBDA Deutschland and Raytheon.
- With Asian companies
  - L&T MBDA Missile Systems Limited: JV comprising MBDA and Larsen & Toubro.
  - MBDA Italy, MBDA UK and SAMI (Saudi Arabian Military Industries) JV.

== Products ==
=== Current products ===
- Air-to-air missiles
  - ASRAAM - short range, IR guided
  - Meteor - long range, active radar terminal homing
  - MICA - IR and radar guided versions (also a surface-to-air missile)
  - Mistral ATAM
- Surface-to-air missiles
  - Missiles
    - CAMM family
    - Eurosam Aster family (in cooperation with Thales Group)
    - Mistral (also an air-to-air missile)
    - MICA VL
  - Air defence systems
    - Aspide / Spada 2000
    - Eurosam SAMP/T (in cooperation with Thales)
    - EMADS
    - MICA VL
    - PAAMS missile system comprising
      - Eurosam PAAMS(E)
      - UKAMS PAAMS(S)
    - Sky Warden / Sea Warden
- Air-to-surface weapons
  - ASMP - French nuclear-armed cruise missile
  - Brimstone
  - Diamond Back range extension kit for the SDB
  - PGM 500 and PGM 2000 guided missiles
  - Storm Shadow/SCALP-EG
  - Viper Strike
- Land-attack missile
  - MdCN, Land Cruise Missile (LCM)
  - Crossbow one way effector (OWE)
  - Thundart
- Anti-ship missiles
  - Exocet (air-, surface ship-, coastal battery- and submarine-launched versions)
  - Marte (air-, surface ship- and coastal battery-launched versions)
  - Otomat/Teseo
- Anti-tank missiles
  - Akeron MP
  - Enforcer
  - MILAN

=== Production ended ===
- Surface-to-air missiles
  - Rapier
  - Sea Wolf
- Air-to-surface weapons
  - Apache
  - AS-30L
  - Laser-Guided Zuni
- Anti-ship missiles
  - Sea Eagle
- Anti-tank missiles
  - Eryx
  - HOT
  - PARS 3 LR - long range (together with Diehl BGT Defence)

=== Cancelled weapons ===
- Next Generation Multiple Warhead System
- Surface-to-air missiles
  - Missiles
    - LFK NG (together with Diehl BGT Defence)
  - Air defence systems
    - MEADS

== Programmes under development ==
=== Products in development ===
- Cruise missiles
  - ASN4G hypersonic nuclear-armed cruise missile
  - Stratus (missile family) (formally known as FC/ASW)
    - STRATUS RS - air/ship launched, supersonic, high manoeuvrability
    - STRATUS LO - air/ship launched, stealthy, subsonic
  - Joint Fire Support Missile (JFS-M)
  - Sea Venom
- Air-to-surface weapons
  - AKERON LP, formerly known as the MAST-F (Missile Air-Sol Tactique Futur) anti-tank missile for the Eurocopter Tiger and the Eurodrone.
- Surface-to-air missiles
  - DefendAir (VSHORAD)
  - Fulgur (missile) (VSHORAD)
- Drones
  - Loitering munitions:
    - Akeron RCX 50
    - Akeron RCH 170
  - MBDA OWE (One-Way Effector) - long range attack drones

=== Educational Programmes ===
MBDA run outreach programmes to promote interest in STEM in high schools, notably an annual 'Robot Rumble' competition for schools in Hertfordshire.

MBDA employees are offered 5 days of special annual paid leave to do STEM-related outreach work.

== Controversies ==
=== Data breach ===
In August 2022, MBDA Missile Systems' data was hacked from a compromised external hard drive. The data allegedly included blueprints of NATO weapons used in the Russo-Ukrainian War, and 80 Gb of such data was sold for 15 Bitcoin (approximately £273,000). NATO started an investigation trying to assess and minimize the impact of this data breach.
