= Nilesat =

Egyptian satellite communication company

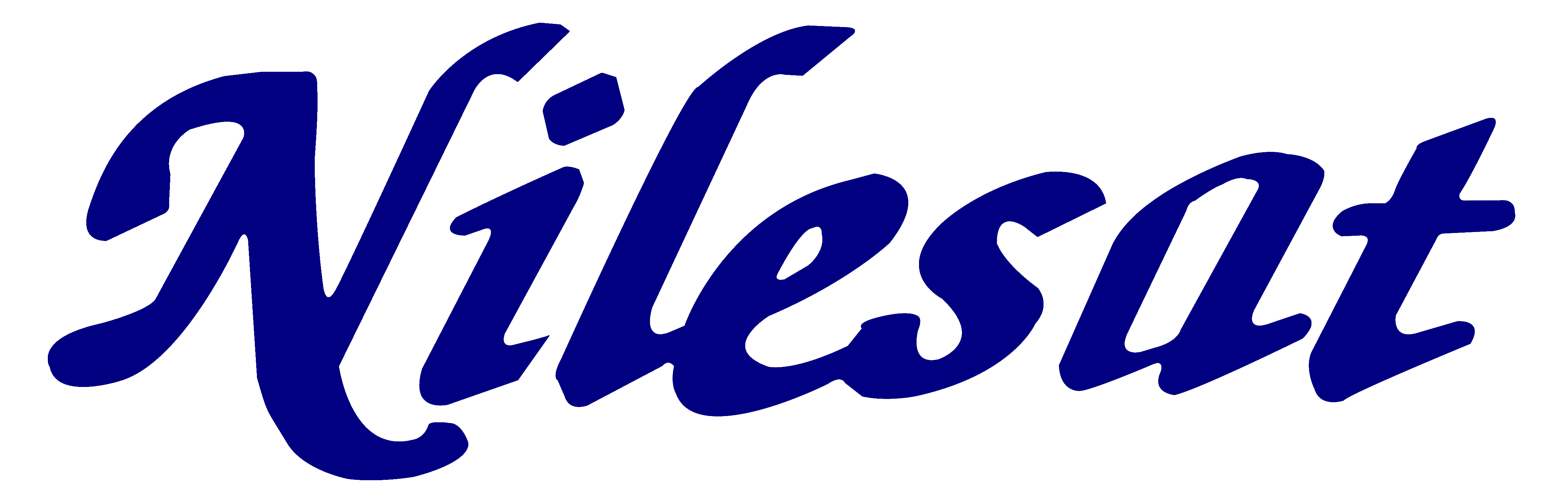
- Type: Telecommunications network
- Industry: Communications satellite
- Founded: July 1998
- Headquarters: 6th of October City, Egypt
- Key people: Sameh Katta (CEO)
- Revenue: US$99,850,000 (2022)
- Net income: 31,000,000 United States dollar (2022)
- Total assets: 615,000,000 United States dollar (2022)
- Website: www.nilesat.org

Egyptian Satellites Co SAE or Nilesat (English: /ˈnaɪlsæt/; Arabic: نايلسات or نايل سات, Egyptian Arabic: [ˈnɑj(e)l ˈsæːt]) is a company and the name of a series of Egyptian communications satellites. It was established in 1996 by the government of Egypt with the purpose of operating Egyptian satellites and their associated mission control center and ground stations. The company is now listed on the Egyptian Exchange, though remains controlled by the government (c.75%) through the National Media Authority (40%), and other state-owned enterprises (SOEs).

The company has two ground stations, a primary one in 6th of October City and a secondary ground station in Alexandria. The two ground stations were built by EADS Astrium. Nilesat operates multiple geosynchronous communications satellites, all of which are stationed at 7 degrees West. Nilesat includes as of 17 April 2022 1091 video channels, most of which are free-to-air. In 2025, Nilesat Records USD 48.63 million in revenue in H1 2025, a 4.3% YoY Decline.

== Nilesat 101 ==
Nilesat 101 was launched by an Ariane 4 rocket from Kourou, French Guiana on 28 April 1998 at 22:53:00 UTC by the European Space Agency. It was manufactured by the European company Matra Marconi Space (Astrium) and started official broadcasting on 31 May 1998. The satellite had an expected lifetime of 12 years. At launch, the spacecraft had a Gross Liftoff Weight (GLOW) of 1,666 kg, which means it is loaded with propellant. The satellite was decommissioned in February 2013.

== Nilesat 102 ==
Nilesat 102 was launched by an Ariane 44LP rocket from Kourou, French Guiana on 17 August 2000 at 23:16 UTC by the European Space Agency. It was manufactured by the European company Matra Marconi Space (Astrium), and started official broadcasting on 12 September 2000. The satellite had an expected lifetime of 15 years. At launch, the spacecraft had a Gross Liftoff Weight (GLOW) of 1,827 kg. The mission was retired in June 2018.

== Nilesat 103 ==
Nilesat 103 satellite was a leased communications satellite. Nilesat and Eutelsat agreed in September 2005 to lease capacity on Eutelsat's Hot Bird 4 satellite after relocating it to 7° West and renaming it Atlantic Bird 4 (marketed as Nilesat 103). The satellite has been repositioned to this location in the second quarter of 2006 after the launch and entry into service of Eutelsat's Hot Bird 7A and Hot Bird 8 satellites.

Nilesat 103 joined its two existing sister satellites Nilesat 101 and Nilesat 102 in providing Direct Broadcast Satellite (Direct to Home or DTH) digital TV channels, data transmission, turbo internet and multicasting applications to more than 15 million viewers in the North African and Middle East region. In April 2009 the satellite has been repositioned to 16° East as Eurobird 16.

== Nilesat 104 ==
The orbital slot at 7° West which was left by Nilesat 103 in 2009 has been replaced with the new Hot Bird 10, renamed as Atlantic Bird 4A. Some transponders aboard this satellite have been leased by Nilesat, functioning as Nilesat 104. In October 2011, Atlantic Bird 7 entered service and assumed this role as Nilesat 104 instead of Atlantic Bird 4A (which was moved to a different orbital position). In March 2012, Atlantic Bird 7 was renamed to Eutelsat 7 West A as part of Eutelsat's new nomenclature system.

== Nilesat 104B ==
Nilesat has leased capacity on Eutelsat 8 West B and markets it as Nilesat 104B.

== Nilesat 201 ==
Nilesat selected Thales Alenia Space of France and Italy in May 2008 to build the Nilesat 201 satellite, which was launched on 4 August 2010 aboard a European Ariane 5 rocket.

The Nilesat 201 satellite, which was launched into Nilesat's 7° West slot, is built on the Thales Alenia Space Spacebus-4000B2 platform and weighs 3,129 kilograms. It carries 24 Ku-band transponders and four transponders in Ka-band for direct-to-home television, radio and data-transmissions in the Middle East and North Africa.

== Nilesat 301 ==
Built by Thales Alenia Space and launched by SpaceX on 8 June 2022, the Egyptian satellite is stationed at 7° West at geostationary transfer orbit. SpaceX successfully executed the furthest downrange landing of a Falcon 9 booster on this mission by landing 687 km (427 mi) away from the launch site.

The Nilesat 301 satellite, is bulit on the Thales Alenia Space Spacebus-4000B2 platform and weighs around 3,938 to 4,100 kilograms, It Carries 20 Ku-band transporters, 12 Extended Ku-band transporters and 6 Ka-band Transporters for direct-to-home television, radio and data transmissions in the Middle East, North Africa, South Part of Africa and the Nile Basin

== See also ==
- Telecom Egypt
