= Nilesat 101 =

Egyptian communication satellite

Coordinates: 0°N 7°W

- Mission type: Communications
- Operator: Nilesat
- COSPAR ID: 1998-024A
- SATCAT no.: 25311
- Mission duration: 18 years

Spacecraft properties
- Bus: Eurostar-2000
- Manufacturer: Matra Marconi
- Launch mass: 1,666 kilograms (3,673 lb)
- Power: watts

Start of mission
- Launch date: 28 April 1998, 22:53 UTC
- Rocket: Ariane 44P
- Launch site: Kourou ELA-2
- Contractor: Arianespace

End of mission
- Disposal: Decommissioned
- Deactivated: February 2013

Orbital parameters
- Reference system: Geocentric
- Regime: Geostationary
- Longitude: 7° West
- Perigee altitude: 36,512 kilometres (22,688 mi)
- Apogee altitude: 36,725 kilometres (22,820 mi)
- Inclination: 0.73 degrees
- Period: 24.64 hours
- Epoch: 29 October 2013, 10:24:24 UTC

Transponders
- Band: 12 Ku-band

Nilesat 101 is an Egyptian owned geosynchronous communications satellite that was decommissioned in February 2013.

== Launch ==
Nilesat 101 was launched by an Ariane 4 rocket from Kourou, French Guiana on 28 April 1998 at 22:53:00 UTC by Arianespace. The satellite is powered by solar arrays, and the power is stored aboard batteries.

== Mission ==
The satellite was manufactured by the European company Matra Marconi Space (Astrium), and started official broadcasting on 1 June 1998 with a mission life of 12 years. At launch the spacecraft had a gross mass of 1,666 kg.

=== Orbit ===
It was parked at the geostationary orbital position of 7° West together with its sister Satellite Nilesat 102 and carries 12 K_{u} band 100 W high power wide beam transponders of 33 MHz bandwidth to provide digital communications and terrestrial Direct to Home ((DTH)) TV, radio broadcasting, multimedia and data services for countries in North Africa, South Europe and the Middle East. The two satellites carry approximately 150 TV channels, with 100 of those originally coming from Nilesat 101, covering all the Middle East countries; north from Southern Europe to Central Africa, south, and east from Iran to the Atlantic Ocean, west. Nilesat 101 provided service to more than five million homes.

=== Operations ===
Nilesat 101 was operated by The Egyptian satellite Co. Nilesat that was established in 1996 with the purpose of operating Egyptian satellites and their associated mission control center and ground stations. The two control centers are located in Cairo and Alexandria.

== See also ==
- European Space Agency
