= Matra Marconi Space =

Franco-British aerospace company (1990–2000)

- Type: Subsidiary
- Industry: Spacecraft
- Predecessor: Matra Espace; Marconi Space Systems
- Founded: 1990
- Defunct: 2000
- Fate: Merged with DASA in 2000
- Successor: Astrium
- Headquarters: Toulouse, France
- Products: Satellites
- Parent: Matra (51%); GEC-Marconi (49%)

Matra Marconi Space (MMS) was an Anglo-French aerospace company.

== History ==
Matra Marconi Space was established in 1990 as a joint venture between the space and telecommunication division of the French conglomerate Matra (Matra Espace) and that of the British GEC group (Marconi Space Systems). The new company was announced in December 1989 and was owned 51% by Matra and 49% by GEC-Marconi. It would have annual sales of £300 million, with £8.7 million in assets from Marconi Space Systems and £10.7 million in assets from Matra Espace.

Claude Goumy, the Managing Director of Matra Espace was the first Managing Director. The first deputy Managing Director was Richard Wignall, the former Managing Director of Marconi Space Systems. The space industry was important to France - almost half the budget of the European Space Agency (ESA) came from the French government.

=== Acquisitions ===
In 1991, British Aerospace was discussing with MMS how to merge their space interests, as well as Robert Bosch GmbH and Deutsche Aerospace.

On 19 July 1994, it acquired British Aerospace Space Systems (a subsidiary of BAe Dynamics with 900 workers) for £56 million. On 11 August 1994, it bought Ferranti Satcomms (from administration), which was based in Poynton in Cheshire. Ferranti Satcomms brought satellite ground station, component and subsystem technologies to the group.

In July 1995, GEC bought 45% of shares in the National Remote Sensing Centre for the company. Also in July 1995, the company was looking to link up with the French state giant Aérospatiale and DASA of Germany to form a Europe-wide space company. The company would (five years later) link up with DASA.

By 1996, the company was turning over more than £1 billion. In the late 1990s, it developed a partnership with the University of Sheffield's Sheffield Centre for Earth Observation Science (SCEOS), which researched interferometry.

In November 1997, it announced that it would close the Filton site (former BAe Dynamics) in August 1999, with the planned transfer of 300 of 400 personnel and staff from Bristol to Stevenage. The Filton site specialised in scientific satellites and their computer software; projects included Ulysses, Hubble Space Telescope Solar Arrays, Giotto, Envisat / Polar Platform, Solar and Heliospheric Observatory (SoHO) and the Cluster spacecraft destroyed in the first flight of Ariane 5. Over 380 staff left the Company and, as a result, MMS lost the ESA prime contract for the Rosetta spacecraft. British Aerospace regained an interest in the company when it merged with GEC's Marconi Electronic Systems to form BAE Systems in November 1999.

=== Astrium ===
In late 1998, it was discussing a possible merger with DaimlerChrysler Aerospace AG (DASA). In 2000, it was merged with the space division of DASA to form Astrium.

== Management ==
- Jean-Bernard Lévy (1993-1994)
- Roger Wood (1994-1996)

== Products ==
- Skylark (rocket), sounding rocket designed earlier in the 1960s, last launched on 2 May 2005 (its 441st flight - Maser 10) from the Esrange site of the Swedish Space Corporation
- Radar for the European Remote-Sensing Satellite (ERS-1)
- Altitude and orbit-control system for XMM-Newton, which was launched on 10 December 1999
- Advanced synthetic aperture radar (ASAR) on the Envisat
- Propulsion systems (built at Filton) for four Cluster satellites, which were destroyed on 4 June 1996 on the Ariane 5G, Flight 501
- Technologies for Artemis satellite

=== Satellites ===
- Ariel 6
- AfriStar, constructed with Alcatel Space
- AsiaStar, constructed with Alcatel Space
- Hélios (Europe's first) spy satellite
- Hipparcos, constructed with Alenia Spazio
- Hot Bird 2, the largest satellite made in Europe at the time and launched in November 1996, and other later Hot Bird satellites for Eutelsat
- Humidity Sounder for Brazil - launched in May 2002
- Early Inmarsat satellites
- Nilesat 101 - launched in April 1998, for ERTU
- Nilesat 102 - launched in August 2000
- Skynet satellite
- Solar and Heliospheric Observatory (SoHo) - launched on 2 December 1995
- Three satellites for 1worldspace, launched in 1999

== See also ==
- Matra BAe Dynamics, related missile company
- GEC Alsthom, another GEC Anglo-French company
