= BAe Dynamics =

Former division of British Aerospace

British Aerospace Dynamics Group
- Type: Subsidiary
- Industry: Defence, Spacecraft
- Founded: 1977
- Defunct: August 1996
- Fate: Merged with Matra in 1996
- Successor: Matra BAe Dynamics
- Area served: UK
- Products: Missiles, Satellites
- Parent: British Aerospace

British Aerospace Dynamics Limited (BADL or BAe Dynamics) was a division of British Aerospace.

== History ==
British Aerospace was created in April 1977 by the merger of the British Aircraft Corporation, Hawker Siddeley Aviation, Hawker Siddeley Dynamics and Scottish Aviation.

=== Formation ===
There were two companies in the formation:

- BAC (Guided Weapons)
- Hawker Siddeley Dynamics

The missile, weapon systems and space businesses of these companies were merged into British Aerospace Dynamics Limited (BADL), a wholly owned subsidiary of BAe.

In December 1979, Euromissile Dynamics Group was formed with Aérospatiale of Toulouse, France and MBB of Ottobrunn.

=== Subsidiary company ===
On 1 January 1992, British Aerospace Defence Ltd began trading as a wholly owned subsidiary of BAe. Previously separate defence companies now operated as divisions of that subsidiary:

- British Aerospace (Dynamics) Ltd
- British Aerospace (Military Aircraft) Ltd,
- Royal Ordnance plc
- British Aerospace Systems and Services Division (BAe SSD)

In 1994, the BAe Dynamics subsidiary British Aerospace Space Systems was sold to Matra Marconi Space.

=== Merger with Matra ===
In 1996, BAe Dynamics' guided weapons division was merged with a division of Matra Defense to form the then largest European missile manufacturer, Matra BAe Dynamics. This group now forms part of MBDA.

== Products ==
=== Missiles ===
- ALARM (missile), built with Marconi Space and Defence Systems
- Rapier (missile) SAM, designed earlier by BAC (Guided Weapons), and developed with Marconi Space and Defence Systems (the Blindfire radar), and was superior to the comparative Roland
- Sea Dart (missile), designed earlier by Hawker Siddeley Dynamics
- Sea Eagle (missile) ASM
- Sea Skua ASM
- Sea Wolf (missile) SAM
- Skyflash AAM

=== Satellites ===
- Giotto (spacecraft), approached Halley's Comet in March 1986 (made at Filton)
- Orbital Test Satellite
- Skynet (satellite), built with MSDS
