= Eutelsat 8 West B =

Communications satellite

- Names: Nilesat 104B
- Mission type: Communications
- Operator: Eutelsat
- COSPAR ID: 2015-039B
- SATCAT no.: 40875
- Website: www.eutelsat.com/en/home.html
- Mission duration: 15 years (planned); 9 years, 6 months, 18 days (elapsed)

Spacecraft properties
- Spacecraft: Eutelsat 8 West B
- Spacecraft type: Spacebus
- Bus: Spacebus-4000C3
- Manufacturer: Thales Alenia Space
- Launch mass: 5,782 kg (12,747 lb)
- Power: watts

Start of mission
- Launch date: 20 August 2015, 20:34:08 UTC
- Rocket: Ariane 5ECA (VA255)
- Launch site: Centre Spatial Guyanais, ELA-3
- Contractor: Arianespace
- Entered service: October 2015

Orbital parameters
- Reference system: Geocentric orbit
- Regime: Geostationary orbit
- Longitude: 8° West

Transponders
- Band: 50 transponders: 10 C-band; 40 Ku-band
- Coverage area: South America, Africa, Middle East

Eutelsat 8 West B is a geostationary communications satellite. Operated by Eutelsat, it provides direct-to-home (DTH) broadcasting services from geostationary orbit. The satellite is part of Eutelsat's constellation at a longitude of 8° West. Eutelsat announced the order of a new Spacebus-4000C3 satellite bus from Thales Alenia Space in October 2012.

== Satellite description ==
Eutelsat 8 West B is a 5,782 kg (12,747 lb) satellite with a design life of 15 years. It is equipped with an S400-12 apogee motor which was used for initial orbit-raising manoeuvres and an S10-18 engine for station keeping burns. The spacecraft has 10 C-band and 40 Ku-band transponders.

== Launch ==
Eutelsat 8 West B was launched on the Ariane 5ECA launch vehicles from Centre Spatial Guyanais at the Kourou in French Guiana. Liftoff occurred at 20:34:08 UTC on 20 August 2015, with the launch vehicle successfully injecting its payload into geosynchronous transfer orbit (GTO). The launch was conducted by Arianespace.

== Mission ==
Following launch, the satellite Eutelsat 8 West B used its apogee motor to raise itself into geostationary orbit, positioning itself at a longitude of 8° West. Capacity leased by Nilesat is marketed as Nilesat 104B.
