= T. P. G. Nambiar =

Indian entrepreneur (1929–2024)

- Born: 25 November 1929; Thalassery, Kannur, Kerala, India
- Died: 31 October 2024 (aged 94); Bangalore, India
- Known for: Founder of BPL
- Spouse: Thankam
- Children: 2
- Relatives: Rajeev Chandrashekhar (son-in-law)
- Awards: Electronics Man of the Year; National Citizen’s Award; Lifetime Achievement Award; Recognition by Confederation of Indian Industry (CII)

Thadathil Parambil Gopala Krishnan Nambiar known as T. P. G. Nambiar (25 November 1929 – 31 October 2024), was an Indian entrepreneur, who is the founder of BPL (British Physical Laboratories). He supported the evolution of the Indian electronics industry between the years 1960 and 1990. When India was the leader in the market of luxurious televisions, video cassette recorders, and audio systems, Nambiar helped BPL to establish as a household name in consumer electronics, especially in the 1980s and early 1990s.

== Early life and career ==
Born in Kannur, Keralam, India, in 1933, TPG Nambiar started his career in manufacturing, quickly developing an interest in electronics. Early in his career, he traveled to Japan, where he studied manufacturing practices in consumer electronics and medical devices. This experience provided him with technical expertise and strategic insights, which he later applied in founding BPL.

== BPL Group ==
In 1963, T. P. G. Nambiar established BPL (British Physical Laboratories) in Kerala. The company began by producing precision measuring instruments and medical equipment, such as ECG machines. At the time, India's access to high-tech healthcare devices was limited, so BPL's entry into medical electronics addressed a significant gap. Over time, BPL expanded from healthcare technology into consumer electronics, gaining recognition as it adapted to broader market demands. BPL's partnerships with global firms such as Sanyo and Siemens from Germany played a crucial role in its development. These alliances enabled the exchange of technology, helping BPL to establish more pleasing research and development team, as well as manufacturing skills. Nambiar took advantage of these partnerships to broaden BPL's range of products and strengthen its technological infrastructure, enabling the company to stay competitive in the market during the 1980s and 1990s.

== Legacy ==
BPL's influence declined over time, but Nambiar is still recognized for his role in promoting an Indian electronics brand capable of competing with international majors. During a period when most consumer electronics were imported, Nambiar sought to establish locally manufactured, high-quality products accessible to Indian consumers. His contributions helped BPL become a familiar name in the 1980s and 1990s, especially for products like televisions, audio systems, and VCRs, which became popular in Indian households.

Nambiar also invested in local manufacturing and training, which contributed to job creation and supported India's electronics ecosystem. His work set a foundation for future advancements in the electronics and technology sectors.
