= Eurosam =

European manufacturer of anti-air missiles

Eurosam GIE
- Type: Private joint venture
- Industry: Aerospace
- Founded: June 1989
- Headquarters: Paris, France
- Products: Naval and air-defence missiles
- Owner: MBDA France (33.3%); MBDA Italy (33.3%); Thales Group (33.3%)
- Website: www.eurosam.com

Eurosam GIE is a European manufacturer of anti-air missiles. Eurosam was established in June 1989 for the development of the Famille de missiles Sol-Air Futurs (Future Surface-to-Air Family of missiles or FSAF). Eurosam was initially a joint venture between Aérospatiale, Alenia and Thomson-CSF. Now Aérospatiale is a part of MBDA (more precisely of the French branch of MBDA), and Missile and Missile Systems activities of Alenia are now the Italian branch of MBDA. Thomson CSF is now the Thales Group. Thus Eurosam is owned by MBDA France and MBDA Italy (66% share split between both) as well as Thales Group (33%).

== Aster missiles ==
As originally envisaged under the contract for Phase 1 (signed in May 1990) the FSAF involved the use of the Aster 15 and Aster 30 missiles in the following applications:

- SAAM (Système Anti-Air Missile) naval autodefence
  - SAAM-FR — using the Aster 15 on the French aircraft carrier Charles de Gaulle
  - SAAM-IT — using the Aster 15 on the Italian aircraft carrier Cavour
- SAMP/T (Sol-Air Moyenne Portée Terrestre) or Ground-to-Air Medium Range Missile System
  - Using Aster 30 missiles in batteries and Arabel radar
  - The SAMP/T New Generation (SAMP/T NG) was completed in 2025.

== Ground-based SAMP/T systems ==
SAMP/T and its successor SAMP/T NG are ground-based air defence (GBAD) systems, with the capability to intercept so-called air-breathing threats (ABTs), i.e. cruise missiles and jet-propelled aircraft, and tactical ballistic missiles (TBMs). The system is fully autonomous and self-propelled, based on truck-mounted modules. Each system typically includes a fire control unit, with a multi-function radar (MRI) and an Engagement Module (ME), and launching elements, with up to 6 vertical launch platforms (MLT) each carrying eight Aster 30 missiles.

== Naval systems ==
On 17 November 2011 the French Navy air defence frigate Chevalier Paul successfully tested its PAAMS air defence system. It was the longest range intercept to date for the Eurosam system, with any PAAMS system, whether Italian, British or French. Meanwhile, HMS Defender, the Royal Navy's fifth Type 45 destroyer, equipped with the PAAMS (UK) system christened Sea Viper, completed its initial sea trials before returning to the shipyard, in Glasgow.

== Anti-air application ==
In August 1999 FSAF was extended to include PAAMS, the Principal Anti Air Missile System. PAAMS uses both Aster 15 and Aster 30 missiles for self-defence, local area defence and long range area defence. PAAMS is managed by EUROPAAMS, a joint venture between Eurosam (66%) and MBDA subsidiary UKAMS (33%). MBDA also owns 66% of Eurosam, in effect giving it a 77% share of the project. MBDA is itself owned by BAE, Airbus and Leonardo. PAAMS is fitted in the 4 French/Italian Horizon frigates and 6 British Type 45 destroyers.

== "Building block" architecture ==
Eurosam's air-defence systems are based on a modular architecture, with specific modules or "building blocks" which can be combined to precisely tailor each system. A basic system consists of one multi-function radar, a command and control post with Mara computers and Magics operator consoles, and a vertical launch system. Additional sub-systems can be added to optimize the basic system's capabilities for specific missions, such as naval extended area defense or anti-ballistic missile defense.

== Applications ==
In March 1998 Saudi Arabia signed a contract for the SAAM system (Aster 15) to be fitted to its DCN Al Riyadh-class frigates. In August 2011 Turkey's national air and missile competition has attracted bids from a U.S. partnership of Raytheon and Lockheed Martin, offering the Patriot air defense system; Russia's Rosoboronexport, marketing the S-300; China's CPMIEC (China Precision Machinery Export-Import Corp.), offering its HQ-9; and Eurosam's SAMP/T Aster 30. Eurosam has delivered to date 14 units to Italy and France, including 2 First of Class units. France will deploy 10 SAMP/T in 5 air defence squadrons, 4 of which are currently equipped or being equipped. The Italian Army will regroup 5 SAMP/T units in one Regiment, in Mantova, with 4 already delivered. MBDA has offered to sell the Arabel radar to Poland with the Arabel radar 30. Poland's MON has announced the Wisla program's finalists: Raytheon's ‘PATRIOT with options’ offer, and EuroSAM's SAMP/T Mamba system that uses the Aster-30

On 5 January 2018, France and Turkey signed a project definition study contract with Eurosam for a future Long Range Air and Missile Defense System (LORAMIDS). Turkey would also participate, through companies Aselsan and Roketsan, in development work on the mid-life update (MLU) phase of the SAMP/T Aster 30, Block 1NT.
