= SAMP/T =

Franco-Italian surface-to-air missile system

Sol-Air Moyenne-Portée/Terrestre
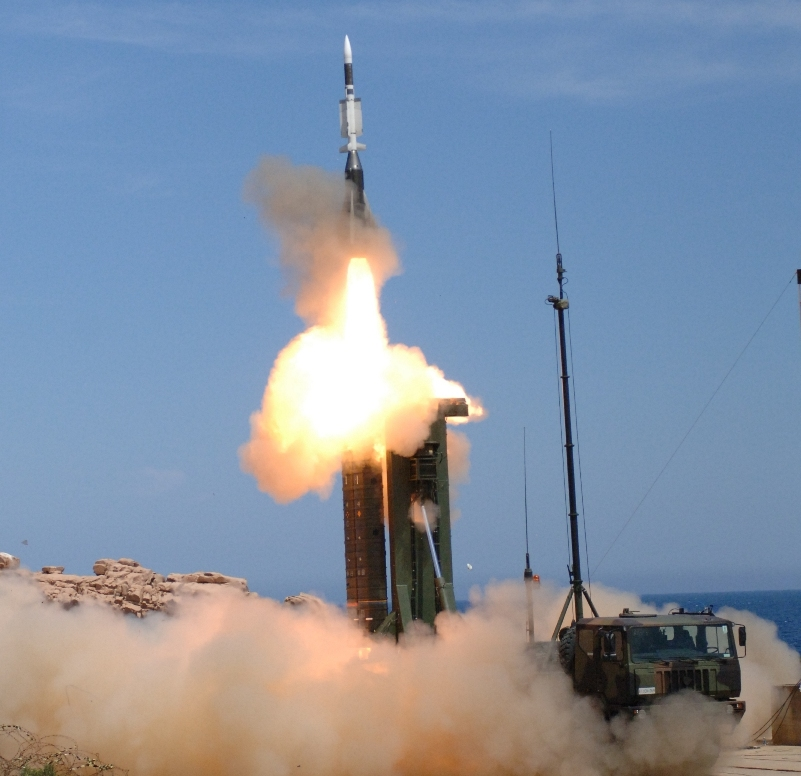
- Italian SAMP/T launcher firing an Aster missile
- Type: Mobile surface-to-air missile/anti-ballistic missile system
- Place of origin: France / Italy

Service history
- Used by: See § Operators
- Wars: Russo-Ukrainian war

Production history
- Designer: Eurosam (joint venture between Thales and MBDA)
- Designed: 1990
- Manufacturer: Eurosam (joint venture between Thales and MBDA)
- Produced: 1997–present
- Variants: See § Variants

Specifications
- Operational range: SAMP/T: 120 km (max) against air-breathing targets; SAMP/T NG: 150 km (min) against air-breathing targets
- Maximum speed: Aster missile: 5,560 km/h (Mach 4.5)

SAMP/T (Sol-Air Moyenne-Portée/Terrestre, French for "Surface-to-Air Medium-Range/Land-based") is an Aster 30 based mobile surface-to-air missile (SAM) system developed as a joint Franco-Italian project. It is capable of defending against aircraft, cruise missiles, and tactical ballistic missiles.

== Development ==
Design of SAMP/T started in 1990 with the goal of producing an all-European long-range ground-based air defence system as a counterpart to the US Patriot missile system. Production began in 1997 and the first systems were delivered to the French and Italian armies for operational evaluation in 2008. Full operation began in France in 2010 and Italy in 2012.

== Design ==
The SAMP/T system is designed around 4–6 launchers holding eight vertically-launched Aster 30 missiles each, one multi-function radar, and one engagement module for battery command and control. A crew of 14 is required per four-launcher battery. All components are designed to be mounted on 8x8 trucks, making the system fully air-transportable by C-130 or similar aircraft.

SAMP/T is capable of tracking 100 aerial targets and engaging 10 simultaneously. The use of Aster 30 missiles provides SAMP/T with the ability to intercept tactical ballistic missiles and hypersonic cruise missiles. It can engage air-breathing targets and cruise missiles at ranges of up to 120 km (75 mi), and can intercept tactical ballistic missiles fired from more than 600 km away when provided long-range cueing data from an external system.

SAMP/T NG was designed with an extended engagement capability, providing 360° and full zenithal coverage. It can be purchased with the French Thales GF 300 radar or the Italian Kronos GMHP radar. SAMP/T NG can engage air-breathing targets at ranges beyond 150 km (93 mi) and at altitudes up to 25 km (82,000 ft), and it can track up to 1,000 targets. The system has a typical crew of 20 per battery, although once the system is encamped only three people are required to operate it.

== Variants ==
=== SAMP/T ===
Original system developed by Eurosam and purchased by France and Italy.

=== SAMP/T NG ===
Next-generation system with greater range and radar coverage purchased by France and Italy. Available since 2025, first deliveries in 2026.

Ukraine will receive eight SAMP/T NG air defence systems ahead of France and Italy according to French President Emmanuel Macron. President Macron said “We agreed that this system [SAMP/T NG], after development, will be initially deployed in Ukraine and will operate in Ukraine.”

The Swiss government is going to decide (probably in June 2026) to acquire a new air defence system designed to engage missiles, cruise missiles and drones over long distances. The system is to be manufactured in Europe and is intended to replace or supplement the Patriot system. The Federal Council is considering cancelling the Patriot procurement because it is facing delays of up to seven years and will cost at least 1.5 times as much.

=== VL MICA integration ===
In April 2026 France's DGA contracted Eurosam, via OCCAR, to integrate the short-range VL MICA and VL MICA NG into SAMP/T NG as a second interceptor tier alongside the Aster 30, with ten multi-layer systems to be delivered from 2030.

== Operational history ==
=== NATO deployment in Turkey (2026) ===
In June 2026, Italy deployed a SAMP/T air defence system to Turkey under NATO's Standing Defense Plan. The Turkish Ministry of National Defence stated on 16 June 2026 that the system would be stationed at the 3rd Main Jet Base Command in Konya as part of efforts to strengthen NATO's air defence capabilities.

=== Russo-Ukrainian war ===
France and Italy each donated a SAMP/T system in 2023 to Ukraine to aid its defence during the Russo-Ukrainian War, with Italy announcing a third system would be donated in 2025. On 11 March 2025, it was claimed that a SAMP/T system had shot down a Russian Sukhoi aircraft.

According to the French Army, Ukrainian SAMP/T air defence systems have outperformed Patriot missiles in intercepting Iskander ballistic missiles, after Russia modified the Iskander's flight profiles.

During its deployment in Ukraine, reports indicated that the SAMP/T system faced initial operational challenges. According to reports from The Wall Street Journal and other defense analysts, the system initially struggled with software-related issues that hindered its effectiveness in intercepting certain Russian ballistic missiles compared to the U.S.-supplied Patriot system.

== Operators ==
=== Current ===
France
French Air and Space Force:
- 7 SAMP/T fire units
- 8 SAMP/T NG fire units on order
Italy
Italian Army:
- 3 SAMP/T fire units
- 10 SAMP/T NG fire units on order
Singapore
Republic of Singapore Air Force:
- 2 SAMP/T fire units
Ukraine
Ukrainian Air Force:
- 1 SAMP/T fire units donated by France and 2 by Italy

=== Future ===
Denmark
Royal Danish Air Force:
- 4 SAMP/T NG fire units ordered in September 2025

Ukraine
Ukrainian Air Force:
- 8 SAMP/T NG fire units are to be donated by France and Italy in 2026

=== Potential sales ===
Belgium
Belgium is looking for a medium range air defence system, the Patriot PAC-3+ and the SAMP/T NG are competing.
Luxembourg
Luxembourg looking for a medium range air defence system, and is in discussion with France.
Europe
Around 10 countries might purchase the SAMP/T NG.
Turkey
In 2026, Turkey initiated negotiations with Italy and France, through the Eurosam consortium, regarding the possible acquisition and co-production of the SAMP/T air and missile defence system. The talks, first reported by Bloomberg in April 2026, are linked to Turkey's efforts to develop its layered air and missile defence architecture, known as Steel Dome. Reports indicate that the discussions also cover the SAMP/T NG variant.The negotiations are understood to include technology transfer, local manufacturing in Turkey, and the potential integration of Leonardo's Kronos radar systems. In May 2026, French and Turkish media reported that President Recep Tayyip Erdoğan and French President Emmanuel Macron had discussed a potential air defence cooperation agreement ahead of the NATO Summit. As of June 2026, negotiations remain ongoing and no contract has been signed or publicly announced.
