= Inmize Sistemas =

Inmize Sistemas, S.L.
- Industry: Defence
- Founded: 6 February 2002
- Headquarters: San Fernando de Henares, Community of Madrid, Spain
- Services: IT systems and services for defence
- Parent: MBDA 40%, Indra Sistemas 40%, Navantia (10%), EADS-CASA (10%)

Inmize Sistemas S.L. is a Spanish company which was formed on 6 February 2002 to integrate the experience and technology of the major Spanish defence companies in the guided weapons sector. Inmize is jointly owned by the Spanish IT company Indra Sistemas (40%), the European complex weapons systems company MBDA (40%), the Spanish shipbuilder and naval combat system company, Navantia (10%), which is integrated within the Spanish state holding company SEPI, and the Spanish subsidiary of the European aerospace and defence company EADS, EADS-CASA (10%). The company is headquartered at Indra's facilities in San Fernando de Henares, near Madrid. Its first contract involves participation in the design and development of the Meteor Beyond Visual Range Air-to-Air Missile (BVRAAM). Spain has a 10% workshare on the Meteor programme.
