= Thundart =

French precision-guided missile system

Thundart is a precision-guided missile system being jointly developed by French companies SAFRAN and MBDA for the French Army.

It is intended to replace France's LRU multiple launch rocket systems and is designed to engage ground targets with guided missiles at ranges of up to 150 km.

== History ==
The Long-Range Land Strike (FLP-T) program to replace the LRU rocket systems was launched in 2023. The systems are scheduled to be retired from service as early as 2027.

In October 2025, MBDA and Safran unveiled the Thundart missile system.

In addition to Thundart, the program includes the Foudre missile system developed by French company Turgis Gaillard.

On April 14, 2026, the MBDA–Safran consortium conducted its first live-fire tests.

On June 15, 2026, French Defense Minister Catherine Vautrin announced at Eurosatory 2026 that the missile system had been selected to replace the French Army's LRU systems.

In September 2026, MBDA and Safran announced plans to establish a joint venture in France that will be responsible for the development, production, and maintenance of the long-range Thundart missile system.

The contract provides for the acquisition of at least 13 systems by 2030, followed by another 26 systems by 2035. The carrier vehicle will be a Scodia four-axle, 8×8 all-wheel-drive truck.

== Operators ==
=== Future ===
France — In June 2026, the French Ministry of Defense announced that Thundart would replace the American LRU system based on the M270 in the French Armed Forces.
