= PGM 500 =

Guided bombs developed by Alenia Marconi Systems

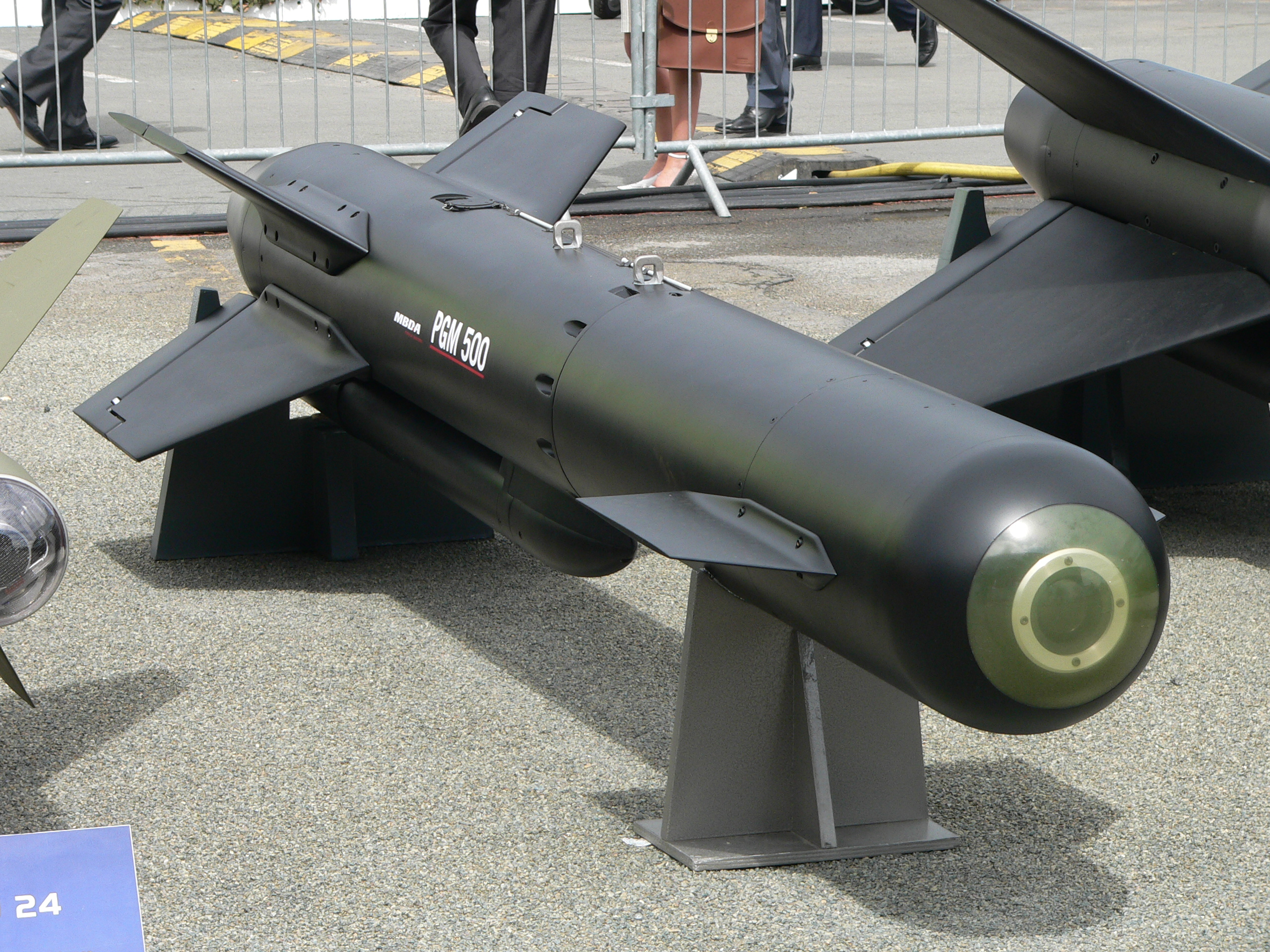
PGM 500

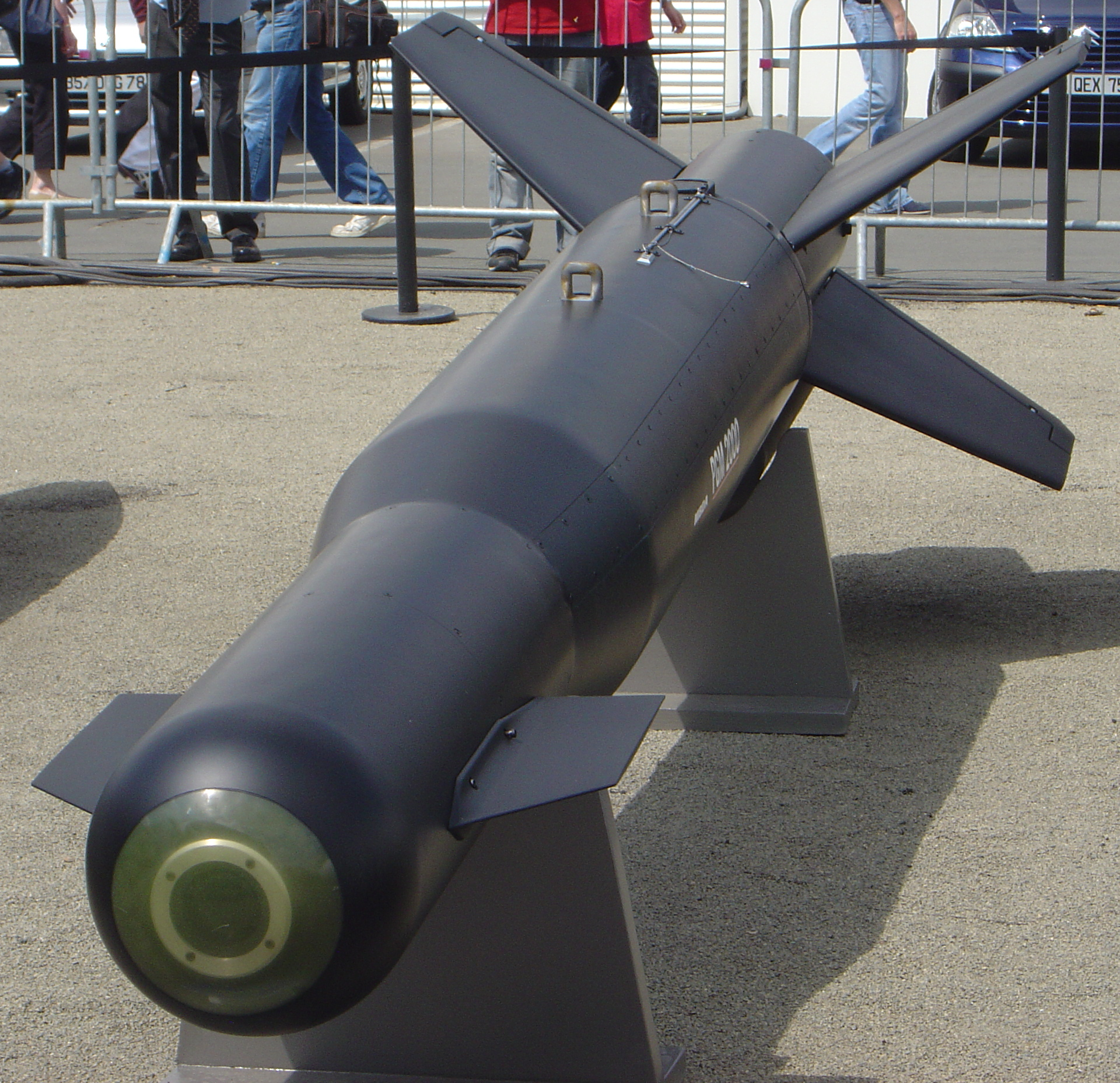
PGM 2000

The PGM 500 and PGM 2000 are guided bombs developed by Alenia Marconi Systems and now marketed by MBDA. The PGM 500 carries a 500 lb (227 kg) warhead, and the PGM 2000 a 2000 lb (909 kg) one. The weapons are available with interchangeable laser, TV, or infra-red seekers.

The PGM 500 is known as the Hakim in United Arab Emirates service.

== Development and design ==
In 1984, the US company International Signal and Control (ISC) began work on a series of guided bombs and missiles for the United Arab Emirates. ISC was purchased by the British company Ferranti in 1987, with Ferranti in turn becoming part of GEC-Marconi in 1991. Development of the missile programme continued through these changes, with the missiles first displayed in public at the 1994 Farnborough Air Show.

There are two major versions of the missile family, one with a 500 lb (227 kg) warhead, called the PGM-500, and one with a 2,000 lb (910 kg) warhead, called the PGM-2000. Four large wings in a "squashed-X" arrangement are fitted at the rear of the missile, with small horizontal fins just behind the missile's nose. The PGM-2000 has an additional stabilising fin under the missile's nose. Both versions are rocket powered, with the PGM-500 having a single solid-fuel rocket slung under the missile body, while the PGM-2000 has two similar rocket engines. This gives a range of 15 km (9.3 mi) at low-level and 50 km (31 mi) at altitude. Both missiles can be fitted with semi-active laser guidance, TV guidance or imaging infra-red guidance, with a data-link pod required aboard the launch aircraft for the latter two options.

An unpowered version, called Lancelot, was proposed in 1993 to meet a UK requirement for a laser-guided bomb, but this was unsuccessful. A turbojet-powered version called Pegasus was offered for the UK's Conventional Armed Standoff Missile (CASOM) programme, with a range of over 250 kilometres (160 mi) and revised guidance, but this was rejected in favour of the MBDA Storm Shadow missile. A revised version, called Centaur was offered to the UAE, but this too was rejected in favour of a version of Storm Shadow, called Black Shaheen.

== Service ==
Production of the laser- and TV-guided variants began in 1990, entering service with the United Arab Emirates Air Force in 1992. The IR-guided weapons entered production in 1993 and entered service in 1995.

== Combat use ==
- Yemen Civil War (2015-)
