= Next Generation Multiple Warhead System =

- Type: Bunker buster
- Place of origin: UK & France

Production history
- Designer: MBDA
- Designed: 2010

The Next Generation Multiple Warhead System, or NGMWS, is a weapon developed by MBDA to defeat hard and deeply buried targets (hence an alternative name, HARDBUT).

The system includes a precursor charge and a follow-through bomb. Development was funded by the British and French ministries of defence.
