= Renault Avantime =

Three-door car by Renault and Matra, 2001–2003

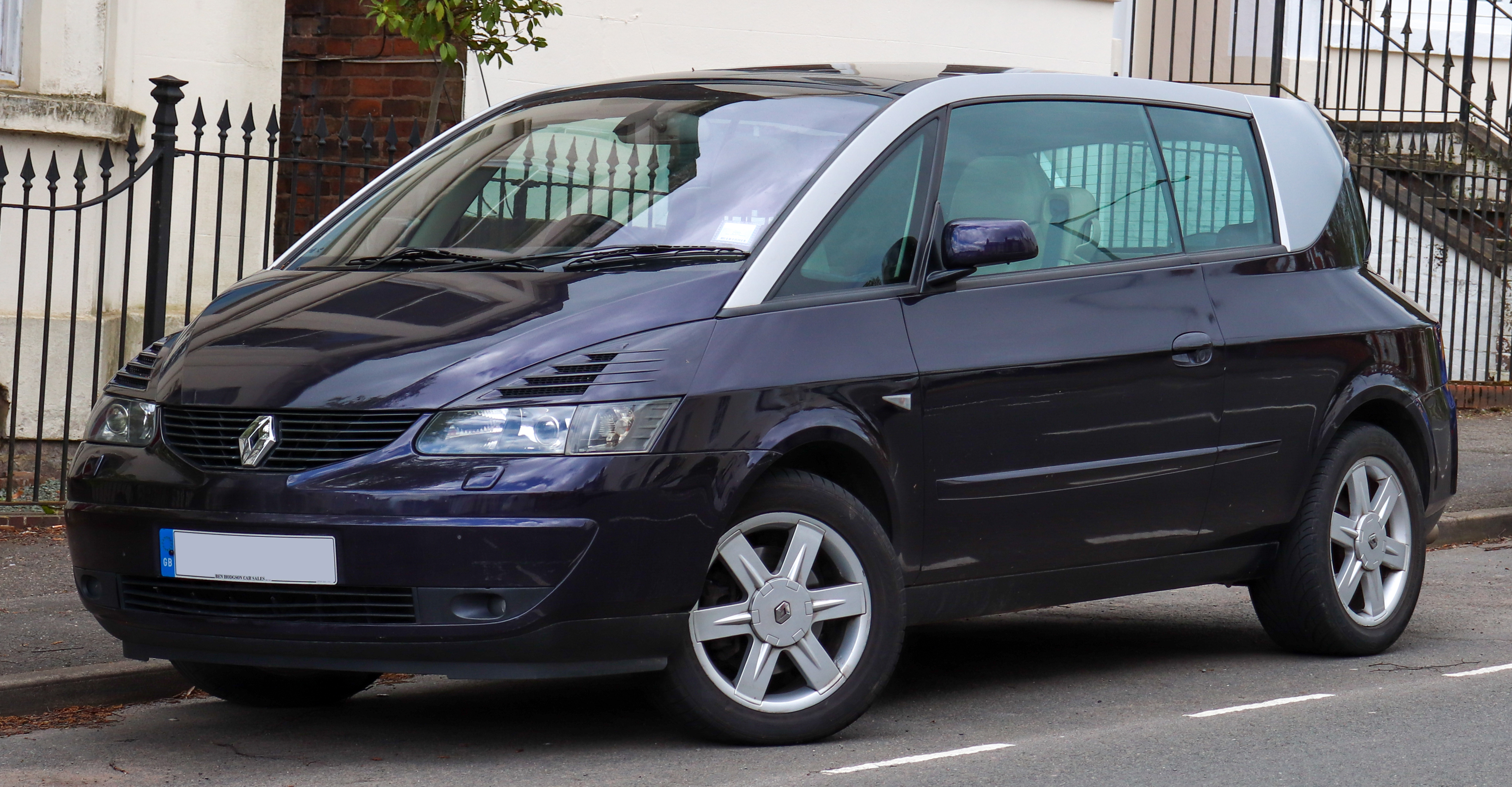

Overview
- Manufacturer: Renault
- Model code: D66
- Production: 2001–2003; 8,557 units
- Assembly: France: Romorantin-Lanthenay (Matra)
- Designer: Patrick Le Quément

Body and chassis
- Class: Mid-size MPV
- Body style: 3-door MPV
- Layout: Front-engine, front-wheel-drive
- Related: Renault Espace

Powertrain
- Engine: Petrol: 2.0 L F4Rt turbo I4; 3.0 L ES9 A V6; Diesel: 2.2 L G9T dCi I4 (LHD only)
- Transmission: 6-speed manual 5-speed automatic

Dimensions
- Wheelbase: 2,702 mm (106.4 in)
- Length: 4,642 mm (182.8 in)
- Width: 1,834 mm (72.2 in)
- Height: 1,627 mm (64.1 in)

The Renault Avantime is a car which was marketed by the French manufacturer Renault and designed and manufactured by Matra between 2001 and 2003. As a one-box design without B-pillars, styled by Patrick Le Quément, the Avantime combined the design elements of a multi-purpose vehicle (MPV), estate car, or shooting brake with the style of a 2+2 coupé and elements of a convertible. It was self-described by Renault as a grand tourer.

The name "Avantime" is a portmanteau of the French word "Avant" (meaning "ahead") and the English word "time" – with the latter using the English /taɪm/ rather than French pronunciation /tiːm/.

== Conception and design ==
The Avantime was designed and developed in-house by Renault affiliate Matra and was conceived by Philippe Guédon, head of the automotive division at Matra, who "believed that the children of Espace owners remained loyal to the car even after they had grown up and left home. As a result, the renowned estate was gaining a generation of new drivers."

Styled by Patrick Le Quément, the Avantime was intended to combine the space of an estate with the four place pillarless qualities of a coupé. Regarding the styling, Thierry Métroz, design project manager, said, "We wanted someone walking around the car to be continually astonished." Anthony Grade, Renault's vice-president of design said, "The exterior and interior had to be coherent. Using the Espace as a base, for instance, meant we had the central instrument display, but that‘s part of the innovative character of the whole vehicle". Car magazine described the interior as architectural and luxurious. The one-box design eliminated B-pillars and featured an aluminium structure, aluminium panels for the greenhouse and a full sunroof of strengthened heat-reflecting glass. The interior featured four seats, each with built in seatbelts, and leather from Bridge of Weir.

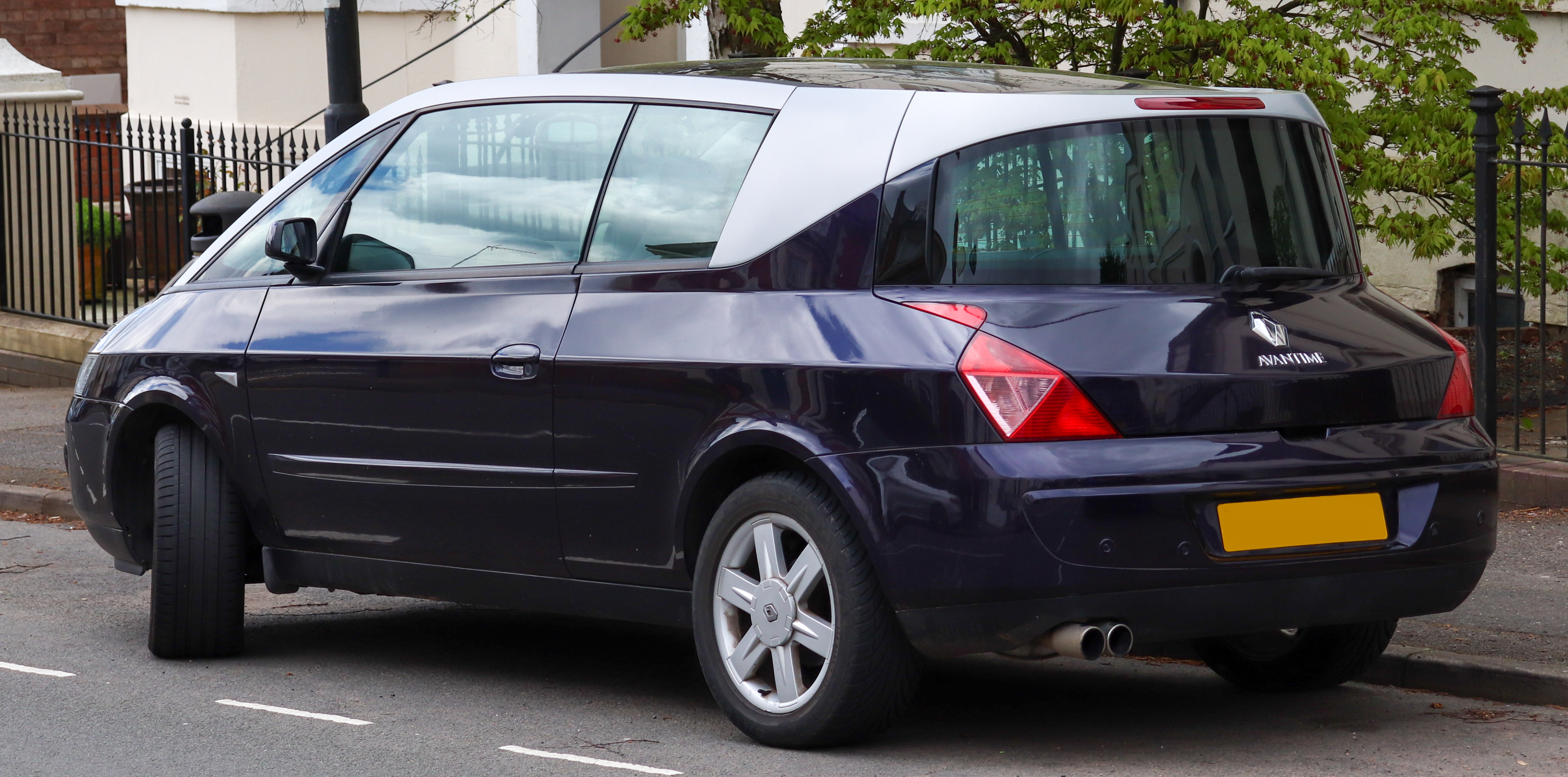
Rear view

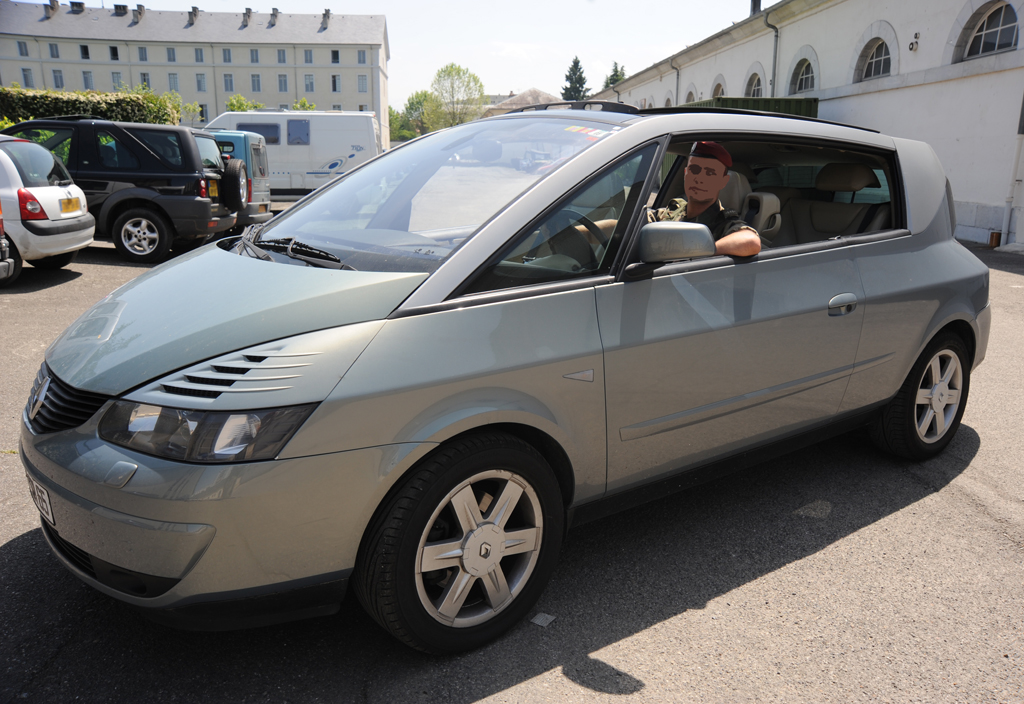
The Avantime offers a "grand air" mode where one button opens all windows and sunroof

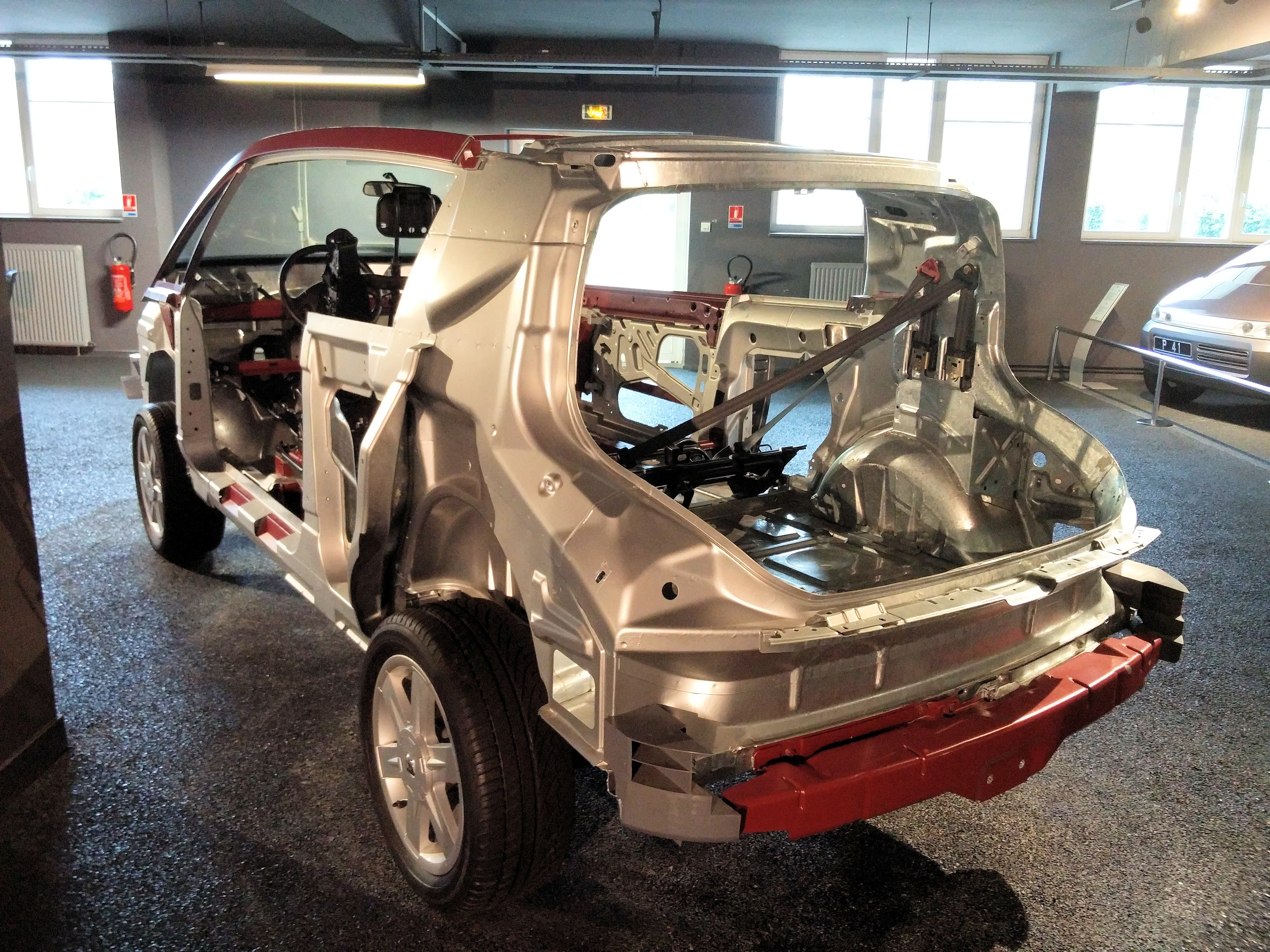
Avantime space frame

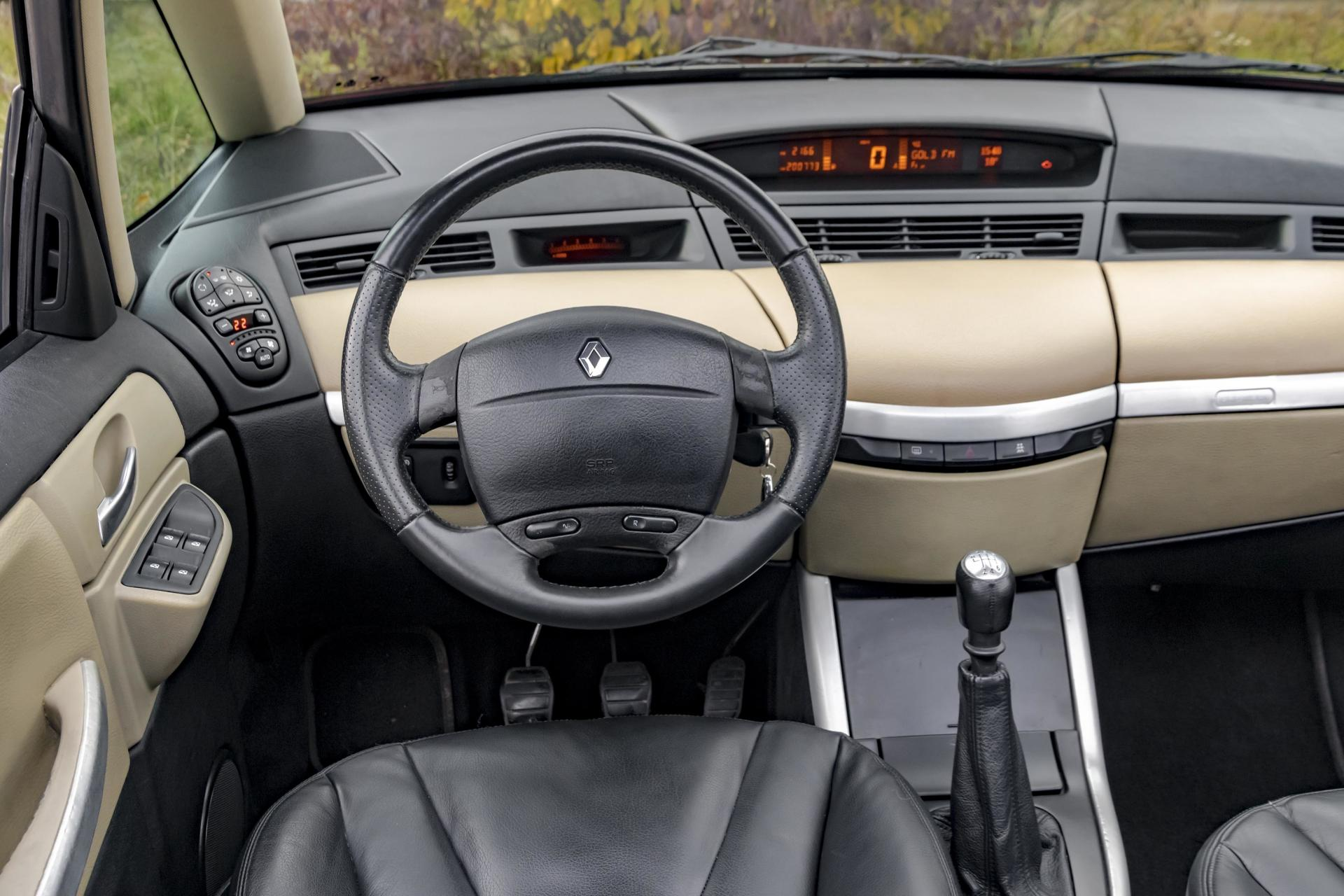
Interior

To facilitate access to the rear seats, two long doors featured a double parallel opening hinge system (marketed as "double kinematic") that maximized access and minimized the door outswing. Front side windows lowered automatically when either of the front seats folded forward to further facilitate entry to the rear two seats. Windows featured power deployable sunshades, and the H-points of the rear two seats were higher than the forward two seats, giving the Avantime "theater seating." The luggage compartment featured a retaining system using retractable straps, and all Avantimes featured a two-tone look created by the exposed aluminium of the greenhouse. The windows and panoramic sunroof could open automatically via a single headliner-mounted control, to give the Avantime an 'open air' mode of previous decades hardtop coupes and sedans.

The design borrowed the automotive space frame of the first generation Renault Espace (load bearing galvanized structure with non-load bearing composite panels) and used the PSA 24 valve, 207 PS (152 kW) 3.0L V6 engine, which was coupled to a six-speed manual transmission or five-speed automatic transmission. Basic engine was the 2.0L 4-cylinder turbo engine with 163 PS (120 kW) and there was also the dCi option, a 2.2L 4-cylinder common rail turbodiesel with 147 PS (108 kW).

A facelift for the Avantime codenamed D67 was planned for 2004-2005 that would have seen the boot lip lowered.

== Launch and reception ==
The Avantime was first shown in February 1999, in concept form at a press launch in the Louvre, and one month later to the public at the Geneva Auto Show – where it was referred to as a "Coupéspace" – and went into production two years later, after the subsequent engineering of the pillarless roof to meet safety standards. The Avantime's sales were poor. The car's fortunes were not helped by the introduction of the Renault Vel Satis (another large, upmarket Renault) around the same time. Renault considered selling the Avantime as an Infiniti in the United States and showed it to prospective buyers. It was quickly determined that it would not be worth the expense of federalizing the design.

When Matra decided to pull out of the automotive production business in 2003 (partly as a result of the financial loss incurred by the poor sales of the Avantime), Renault chose to discontinue the Avantime rather than move its production elsewhere. 8,557 were built from 2001 to 2003, a figure that makes it one of the worst-selling cars of all time. In 2002, Automobile Magazine said "Le Quement is clearly an outside the box thinker, and the product of his vision is a fascinating exercise, but American buyers' utilitarian expectations of the one box shape just don't jibe with the decadence and frivolity of a grand touring coupe."

== Sales ==
Year	Europe (Note: Europe: 2020 EU 27 + UK + Switzerland + Norway + Iceland)
2001	779
2002	5,037
2003	2,226
2004	48
Total:	8,083
