= 1worldspace =

Defunct satellite radio network

WorldSpace
- Industry: Radio Broadcasting
- Founded: 1990
- Key people: Noah A. Samara; Chairman and CEO
- Products: Satellite Radio
- Revenue: ▲US$13.78 Million (2007)
- Net income: ▼ -US$169.51 Million (2007)
- Total equity: US$7.7 million
- Number of employees: 40 (2009)
- Website: https://www.WorldSpace.com

1worldspace, known for most of its existence simply as WorldSpace, is a defunct satellite radio network that in its heyday provided service to over 170,000 subscribers in eastern, southern and northern Africa, the Middle East, and much of Asia with 96% coming from India. It was profitable in India, with 450,000 subscribers.

The two operational satellites that the company had, AfriStar and AsiaStar, are now being used by their new owner, the Yazmi USA, LLC run by WorldSpace's former CEO Noah A. Samara. The company claims to have built the first satellite-to-tablet content delivery system. The system primarily aims at providing educational services to rural areas in developing countries. The first pilots of the technology are said to be taking place in India (with 30,000 licenses) and the sub-Saharan region in Africa, with the latest trials in two schools in South Africa, in Rietkol, in Mpumalanga Province, and at Heathfield, in Western Cape.

== Overview ==
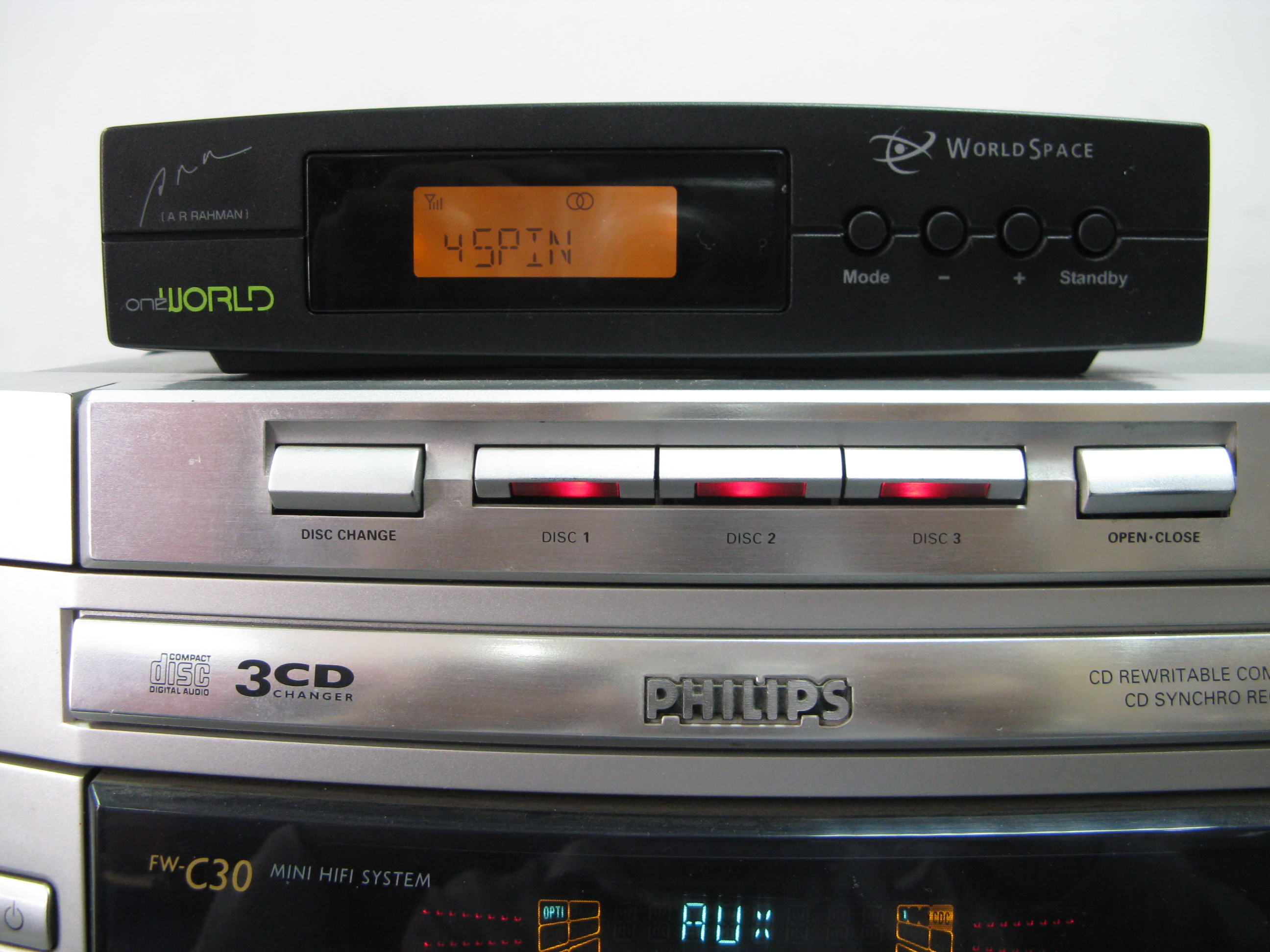
A OneWorld receiver for WorldSpace radio, manufactured by BPL Group

The company, founded in 1990, has its headquarters in Silver Spring, Maryland and additional studios were located in Washington, D.C., Bangalore, Mumbai, New Delhi, and Nairobi. In 1991 Noah Samara, working with Thomas van der Heyden – founder of what was then International Telecommunications Inc. (ITI), later in 1997 to become the geostationary satellite division of Orbital Sciences, prepared and filed for the world's first Radio Broadcast Satellite with the US FCC. In 1992, Samara and van der Heyden (at the time representing the Republic of Indonesia) were able, at WARC-92 with the support of many African and Asian countries, to have the ITU establish a new radio frequency spectrum band dedicated to Broadcast Satellite Services (BSS) in the L-band – 1,452 MHz – 1,492 MHz. After WARC-92 Samara went on to build WorldSpace and van der Heyden to build IndoVison and the Indostar S-band Direct Broadcast Satellite satellite program for Indonesia.

WorldSpace first began broadcasting satellite radio on 1 October 1999, in Africa. In a last-ditch but ultimately completely unsuccessful effort to avoid commercial insolvency in July 2008, WorldSpace changed its brand and corporate identity to 1worldspace.

Before filing for bankruptcy in October 2008, 1worldspace employed two satellites and broadcast 62 channels – 38 of which were content provided by international, national and regional third parties and 24 1worldspace-branded stations produced by or for 1worldspace. Most of the channels used to be available only through a subscription plan.

1worldspace claimed to be the only company with rights to the world's globally allocated spectrum for digital satellite radio. However, it never made use of its license to broadcast to the Americas or the Caribbean. The company gained attention around 2000 because of its willingness to invest in impoverished areas and from 2006 to the present due to its financial difficulties and bankruptcy proceedings.

European operations were liquidated in the spring of 2009. On 25 December 2009, the company issued notices to all of its subscribers in India that WorldSpace service in India would officially be terminated from 31 December 2009, with no refunds given to its subscribers, on account of bankruptcy. The company was known as AfriSpace until 1992 when it changed its name to WorldSpace until July 2008.

For a while Liberty Media (a spin-off of TCI, an American cable-television group) sought to buy the assets, but in June 2010, a company called Yazmi USA owned by former WorldSpace founder, chairman, and CEO Noah Samara purchased the remains for US$5.5M.

On 18 July 2011, Forbes India reported that Timbre Media was re-launching WorldSpace Radio in association with Saregama in September 2011, although it would only be streamed through mobile phones, the Internet and direct-to-home television networks. Reportedly, old WorldSpace receivers would no longer work. The re-launch would start with 40 stations and eventually have as many as 120 stations, including sub-categories such as music for cardio-workouts.

== Content ==
1worldspace assembled a combination of news, sports, music, brand name content and educational programming which it delivered to its market in Africa, Asia, and the Middle East. The 62 channels (38 of which were third-party content and 24 of which were produced by or for 1worldspace) represented popular international music formats including contemporary hits, country, classic rock and jazz with content specific to the local geographic region. Sports coverage included content from Fox Sports Radio and Talksport in addition to regional coverage. 1worldspace also broadcast news from well-renowned sources such as BBC, CNBC, CNN, NPR, RFI, and WRN. Additional content included channels that highlighted poetry and literature, comedy, talk shows, and inspirational and religious programming.

1worldspace's program directors and announcers operated from studios in Washington, D.C., Bangalore, and Nairobi, where 18 original music and lifestyle channels were created for distribution. Four of these stations were previously available in the United States on the XM Satellite Radio network. This arrangement ended in 2008.

== System ==
The 1worldspace system had three major components: the space segment, the ground segment, and the user segment. The space segment referred to the company-owned satellites that broadcast the signals over a large percentage of the eastern hemisphere. The ground segment referred to the operating and broadcasting centers. The user segment referred to the user-owned devices in which the signal was received. In addition, the company planned to implement terrestrial repeater networks in order to facilitate access to new markets in Europe and the Middle-East.

The 1worldspace system was built with companies including Alcatel Space (now Thales Alenia Space), EADS Astrium and Arianespace (France), SED (Canada), GSI (USA), Fraunhofer Society (Germany), ST Microelectronics (Italy), Micronas (Germany) and others.

=== Space segment ===
1worldspace operated two satellites: AfriStar and AsiaStar. This made it available in Asia, Africa, Middle East, and parts of Europe.

The company ordered also a third satellite, AmeriStar (also known as CaribStar and later renamed AfriStar 2). This satellite was built but never launched. A fourth satellite, WorldStar 4, was also considered and some components were acquired. However, the whole WorldStar 4 satellite was never built.

=== Ground segment ===
The regional operations centers for the satellites were located in Silver Spring, Maryland for AfriStar and Melbourne, Australia for AsiaStar. These centers managed the performance and status of the satellites by controlling them and monitoring there. The system architecture is identical for each region.

Telemetry, command and ranging (TCR) ground stations consisted of an X-Band uplink command and control system and an L-Band telemetry monitoring system. A backup mode was also provided using an S-Band link from Bangalore, India. Each satellite had two TCR stations with sufficient geographic distance between them so that if natural disasters or any unforeseen events were to make one inoperable, a back-up station would be available. The TCR stations for AfriStar were located in Bangalore, India and Port Louis, Mauritius, and the ones for AsiaStar in Melbourne, Australia and Port Louis, Mauritius.

In addition to the TCR stations, a communications system monitoring station (CSM) was associated with each satellite to monitor continuously the quality of the downlink services. The CSM facilities were located in Libreville, Gabon and Johannesburg, South Africa for AfriStar and Melbourne, Australia for AsiaStar.

=== User segment ===
Users purchased receivers compatible with the L-Band frequency in order to access the system. The radio receiver processed, decoded and descrambled the signals to allow users to receive programming content. The company's broadcast frequency and satellites required a special receiver design incorporating either a small patch antenna measuring approximately 6 to 8 cm (2.4 to 3.2 inches) which folded neatly into the receiver unit or a similarly sized omni-directional antenna mounted on the car rooftop. Each receiver was individually addressable via a unique identifier that could be used to unlock specially coded audio or multimedia signals. This capability provided the flexibility to deliver free, subscription and/or premium services to consumers.

The currently available receivers were manually coded for subscription authorization. A password, valid for varying periods of time depending upon the length of the subscription purchased and paid for, is provided to a subscriber and entered into the receiver. Passwords were re-validated on a quarterly basis. Upon subscription renewal, a new passcode was provided and similarly entered into the receiver. As new receiver products were introduced, there were plans to provide over-the-air activation of subscriptions.

The radio sets, or receivers, which could pick up 1worldspace signals were manufactured by South Korea's AMI, India's BPL and China's Tongshi, among other corporations. Discontinued models were manufactured by JVC, Sanyo, Hitachi, and Panasonic. The radios consisted of a satellite receiver plus an antenna that has to be placed in clear view of the relevant satellite, and properly oriented to the user's geographic azimuth and elevation. A new receiver manufactured by Delphi using open standard ETSI Satellite Digital Radio technology would have been used in Europe if the company had entered the car satellite radio receiver marketplace.

=== Debt ===
1worldspace finally became insolvent in 2009/2010 after a prolonged series of financial crises. In the first quarter of 2008 the company lost a net total of 2,676 subscribers and reported that it would scale back its marketing activities around the world. WorldSpace recorded a $36.0 million net loss in the second quarter of 2008, as compared to a net loss of $51.2 million in the second quarter of 2007. Throughout 2008 and 2009 company was in deep debt and was reported to owe its creditors over $50 million, due to be paid by various repeatedly postponed deadlines.

=== Bankruptcy ===
The company filed for Chapter 11 bankruptcy protection on 17 October 2008. The reorganization includes a 90-day $13 million debtor-in-possession financing approach, with the hopes of obtaining added funds to repay senior secured notes and convertible notes. The company's wholly owned India affiliate was not covered by the bankruptcy filing.

=== High-profile resignations ===
In August 2008, two of the top executives of 1worldspace announced their resignations. Greg Armstrong, co-COO, left effective on 1 August and Alexander Brown, co-COO, has given notice of his intention to leave.

== Promotional information ==
WorldSpace audio advertisements in 2006 highlighted the company's ability to provide communication and data-transmission services to remote areas of the world, particularly in a disaster-relief context. The promotions also mentioned WorldSpace's facilitation of long-distance educational projects in Africa. The ads, broadcast on Washington D.C. radio stations, appeared aimed at government procurement officials and possibly NGOs.

WorldSpace named noted Indian composer A.R. Rahman as its brand ambassador in India where 90% of its customers are located, and unveiled an integrated marketing communication campaign across print and visual media featuring an exclusive signature tune composed by Mr. Rahman.

== Philanthropy ==
WorldSpace Foundation was a 501(c)(3) tax-exempt organization created in 1997 with the aim of improving literacy in Africa, and providing content through satellite to smaller community radio stations in the continent. WorldSpace Foundation has changed its name to First Voice International.

First Voice International was a non-profit organization that tried to ensure that people living in poverty and remote places get the information they need to improve their lives, have the means to communicate their needs and wants, are able to share what they know with others – in their own voice. The organization attempted to reach the most people for the least cost by combining satellite and other technologies. By bypassing the isolating effects of illiteracy and remoteness, the organization routinely delivers information to people in areas lacking electricity, telephone or Internet service.

== Historic plans for service development ==
Since uninterrupted line of sight reception may be difficult in the urban areas, a need to install terrestrial repeating transmitters to rebroadcast the satellite signals in the largest metropolitan areas of intended mobile DARS markets was identified. The company had been licensed to build networks of terrestrial repeaters in Italy, Switzerland and Germany. With this addition, the system could have provided more reliable broadcast services to receivers in automobiles. 1worldspace had planned to start providing mobile radio and data services in Italy using a combination of satellite and terrestrial broadcasts in late 2009. It had signed an agreement with Fiat, an Italian automobile manufacturer, to make radios capable of receiving the signals available to car owners. Fiat had planned to make such radios available as a bookable option made prior to purchasing a car. If the service had been launched and had been a commercial success in Italy, it was then planned to make similar services available in Germany and Switzerland. 1worldspace would have used ETSI Satellite Digital Radio (SDR) open standard in the new European coverage beam. The receivers for the new markets would have been manufactured by Delphi and would have delivered a gap-free coverage to vehicles similar to that of SiriusXM Radio vehicular mobile service.

== See also ==
- Sirius Satellite Radio, a satellite radio company
- XM Satellite Radio, a satellite radio company
- SiriusXM, a satellite radio company
