= AsiaStar =

American space communications satellite

- Mission type: Communications
- Operator: 1worldspace
- COSPAR ID: 2000-016A
- SATCAT no.: 26107
- Mission duration: 12 years (planned)

Spacecraft properties
- Bus: Eurostar E2000+
- Manufacturer: Matra Marconi Space; Alcatel Space
- Launch mass: 2777 kg
- Dry mass: 1530 kg
- Power: 5600 watts

Start of mission
- Launch date: 21 March 2000, 23:29:00 UTC
- Rocket: Ariane 5G
- Launch site: Kourou, ELA-3
- Contractor: Arianespace

Orbital parameters
- Reference system: Geocentric
- Regime: Geostationary
- Longitude: 105.0° East
- Perigee altitude: 35776 km
- Apogee altitude: 35811 km
- Inclination: 0.06°
- Period: 1436.16 minutes
- Epoch: 23 January 2015, 21:10:09 UTC

AsiaStar is an American communications satellite which was operated by 1worldspace. It was constructed by Matra Marconi Space with Alcatel Space based on the Eurostar E2000+ bus design. Launch occurred on 21 March 2000, at 23:29:00 UTC. The launch was contracted by Arianespace, and used an Ariane 5G carrier rocket flying from ELA-3 at the Centre Spatial Guyanais. The INSAT-3B satellite was launched on the same rocket.

Following its launch and on-orbit testing, it was placed in geostationary orbit at 105.0° East, from where it provides mobile communications services to Asia. It carries three transponders, and has an expected on-orbit lifespan of 12 years. The satellite had a weight of 2777 kg, and 5.6 kW of power, and three-axis stabilized; has relayed digital radio broadcasts to East Asia.

On 31 December 2009, Worldspace ceased broadcasting on the Asiastar satellite in line with its bankruptcy issues. However, as of 30 November 2010, two Free to Air (unencrypted) stations are still available, namely Sai Global Harmony and Radio France International. In 2010, the ownership of the AsiaStar satellite as well as other assets of the 1worlspace company were bought by Noah A. Samara (former CEO of 1worldspace) and by his new company Yazmi USA.

The AsiaStar satellite was acquired in late 2014 by New York Broadband LLC and used as an orbital placeholder for their planned Silkwave 1 (originally NYBBSat-1) satellite. As of 2020, Silkwave 1 has not been launched.
