= Matra =

Former French company

- Industry: Conglomerate
- Founded: 1945
- Founders: Jean-Luc Lagardère; Marcel Chassagny
- Defunct: 2003
- Fate: Bankruptcy
- Headquarters: Romorantin-Lanthenay, France
- Products: Automobiles, aeronautics and weaponry

Matra (an acronym for Mécanique Aviation Traction) was a major French industrial conglomerate. Its business activities covered a wide range of industries, notably aerospace, defence, automotive, motorsports, transport and telecommunications.

Following the acquisition of vehicle manufacturer Automobiles René Bonnet, the company founded Matra Automobiles during the 1960s, which produced a limited range of racing and sports cars. Its car division worked closely with other vehicle manufacturers, most significantly Renault, prior to the decline and sale of Matra Automobiles during the early 2000s. In addition to road cars, Matra entered into a wide range of businesses, eventually diversifying into media, weaponry, aeronautics, automobiles, and music distribution.

Matra was at one point owned by the Floirat family. Throughout much of the company's existence, French businessman Jean-Luc Lagardère was the CEO of Matra. In 1988, Matra was privatised; Lagardère's stake in the company grew considerably over the following years.

In 1994, Matra became a subsidiary of the Lagardère Group and in February 1999, Matra Hautes Technologies (MHT), which represented the conglomerate's aerospace, defence and telecommunications arm, was merged with the French aerospace corporation Aérospatiale to form Aérospatiale-Matra (now Airbus). Several former assets of Matra continue to operate under the Lagardère name. A combination of privatisation, bleeding through the Lagardère Group, the selling-off of its profitable enterprises, and the poor performance of its automotive division caught up with the company, resulting in Matra being declared bankrupt in 2003.

== Overview ==
During 1945, Matra (Mécanique Aviation Traction) was established, immediately beginning development of an ambitious twin-engine aircraft intended to be the fastest propeller-driven plane in the world. In 1951, the sound barrier was broken in horizontal flight for the first time in Europe by an aircraft using a Matra-built engine. During 1961, Matra became involved in the early European space programme, having been appointed as the first prime contractor for satellites.

During 1963, French businessman Jean-Luc Lagardère was appointed CEO of Matra; he would be a key figure at the company for the following three decades. At the time of Lagardère's appointment, the firm had a workforce of 1,450. During 1964, Matra became the owner of car manufacturer Automobiles René Bonnet. For a time, Matra was largely centred around its vehicle division, Matra Automobiles. However, within a decade, Matra had sold its road car division to American-owned car manufacturer Chrysler Europe, having shifted focus onto its other growing business activities.

During the 1970s, Lagardère pursued an overall strategy of merging Matra with various other companies, or acquiring them outright, to build up a conglomerate under the Matra brand. Throughout the 1970s, the company strengthened and grew its position within the aerospace sector, which had been viewed as a core business of Matra. One such company was the electrical equipment manufacturer Électronique Moderne de l’Oise, which became Matra Électronique following its acquisition during 1975. That same year, the National Centre for Space Studies (CNES) and the European Space Agency (ESA) awarded a contract to Matra for the loading bay of the new Ariane expendable launch system.

Over several decades, Matra diversified into media, weaponry, aeronautics, automobiles, music distribution, and various other state of the art technologies. During 1981, Matra ventured into media activities via the purchase of the Hachette publishing company. Matra invested in several fields of transportation during the 1980s and 1990s. It produced a fiberglass 14 ft sailing dinghy with an innovative double-bottom, self-bailing hull, called "Capricorne". Though several hundred were sold and a class association briefly existed, it was unable to gain much market share against the better established International 420. During 1983, Matra launched an automatic (driverless) light rubber-tyred metro, the Véhicule Automatique Léger. It later attempted to produce a personal rapid transit system, which it named "Aramis". Matra also manufactured a range of electric bicycles and electric scooters. Matra i-step Runner, Tourer and Force as well as Matra i-flow in Romorantin. Matra developed and released a personal computer, the Alice.

Matra, along with Harris Corporation, attempted to position itself as a leading semiconductor operation in Europe, establishing Matra-Harris Semiconducteurs (MHS) in 1979. Starting with Harris' CMOS fabrication process and targeting high-performance, high-volume niches, the company diversified into microprocessors and gate arrays, finally recording a profit in 1984. To supply its microprocessor production, MHS secured a licensing agreement with Intel in 1981 for the production of Intel's 8086, 8088, 8051 and 8052 families using an NMOS process, alongside Harris' 80C86 and 80C88 parts. The company also manufactured memory product designs from Cypress Semiconductor. Consolidation in the European semiconductor industry saw AEG acquire 50% of MHS in 1989.

During 1988, Matra was privatised, at which point Lagardère acquired six per cent of the company's stock; by 1992, his stake in Matra had risen to 25 per cent. That same year, the Lagardère Group was radically restructured; acquiring more shares in Matra from Floirat, Daimler Benz and GEC, and Hachette from Floirat, Crédit Lyonnais and Aberly. Lagardère merged Matra and Hachette to form Matra Hachette, of which the Lagardère Group held 37.6 per cent. Following a share swap in 1994, Lagardère held 93.3 per cent of Matra Hachette's stock. During 1996, Matra Hachette was formally merged into the Lagardère Group.

In February 1999, the firm's defence wing, Matra Hautes Technologies, was merged with French aerospace conglomerate Aérospatiale to form Aérospatiale-Matra. During 2003, following poor financial performances within the sector, Matra Automobiles became bankrupt and its assets were sold off once more. Instead, Matra decided to concentrate its resources on its remaining interests within the media and aerospace sectors.

== Matra Automobiles ==
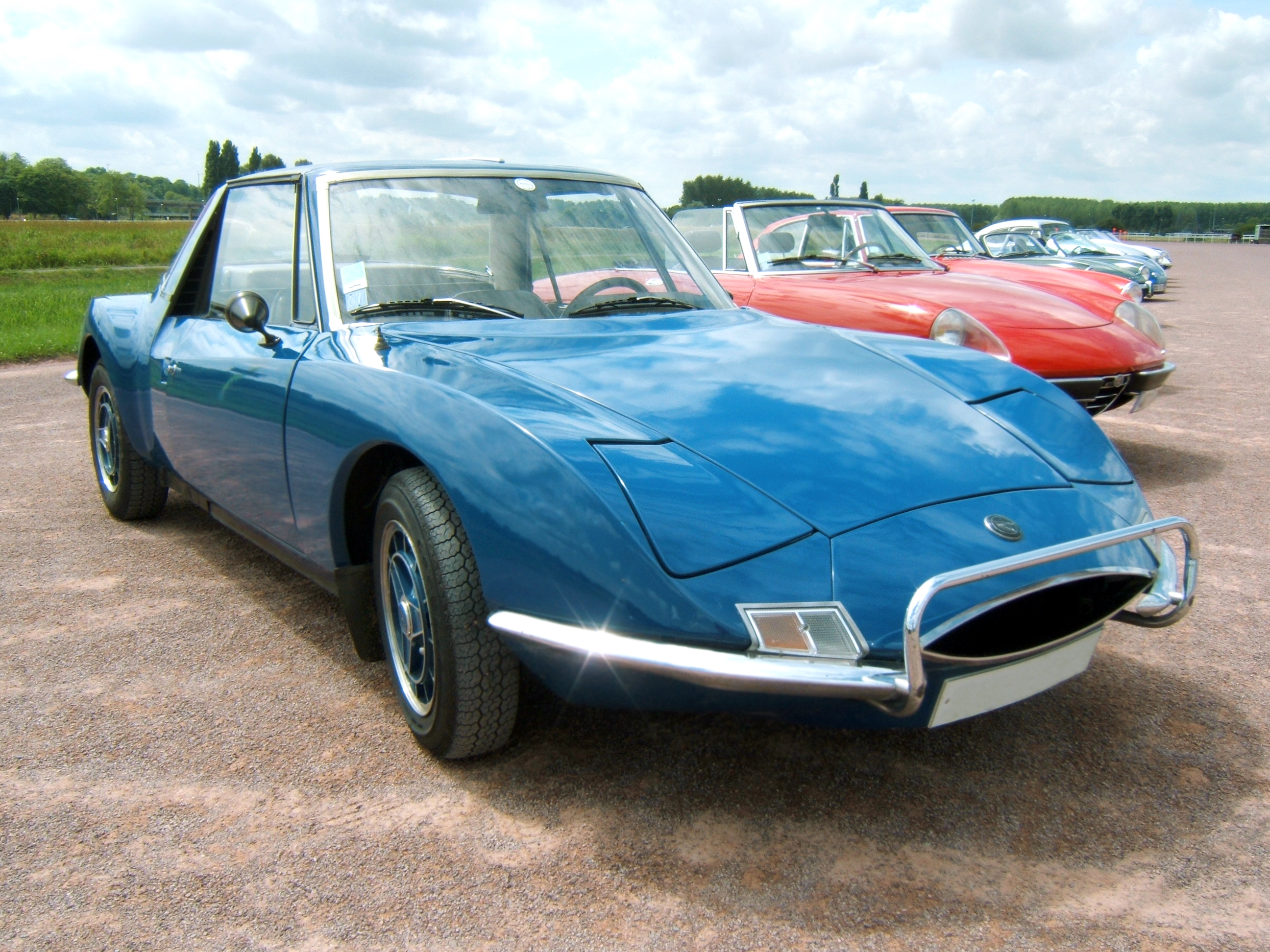
Matra 530

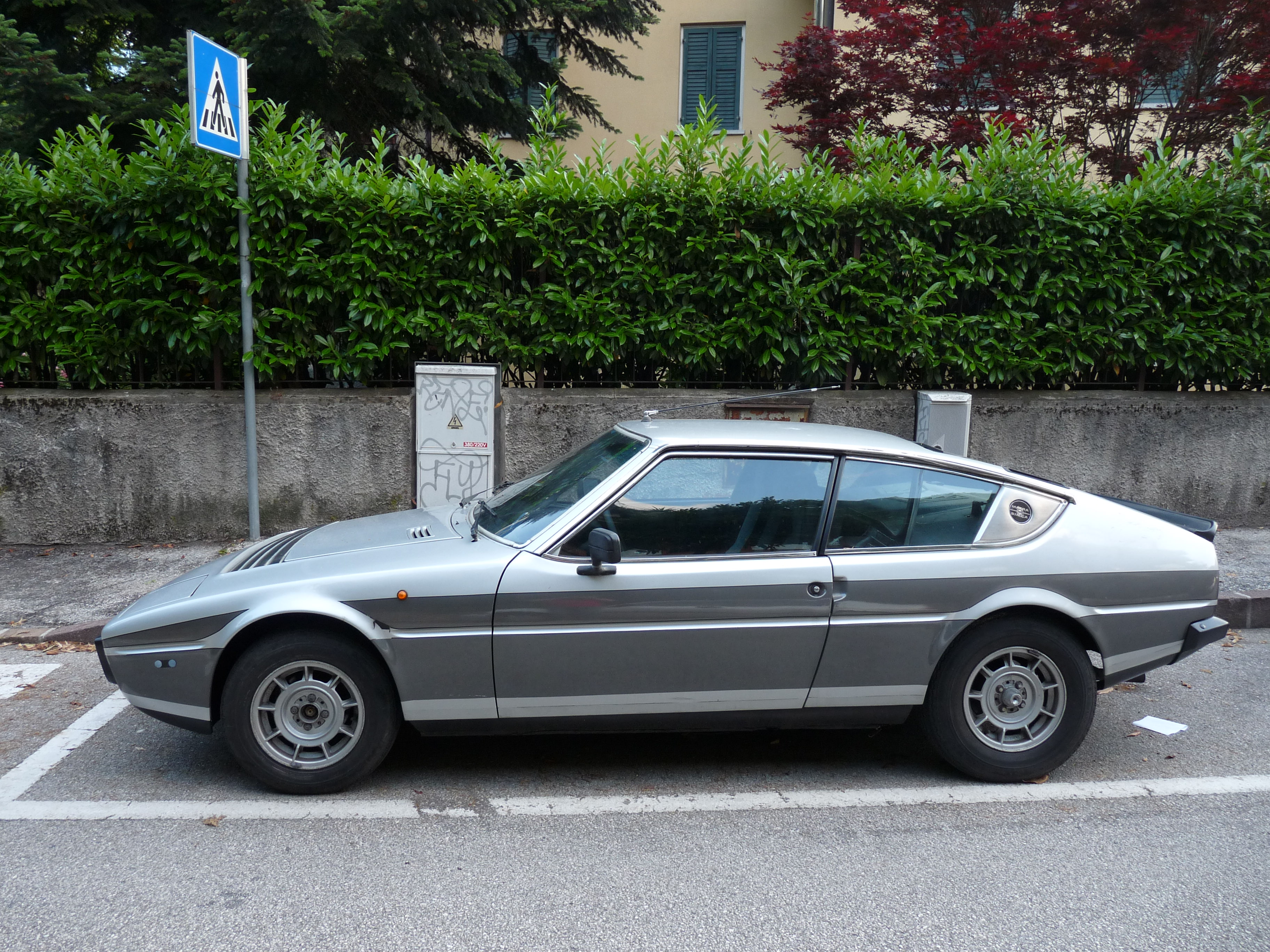
Matra Bagheera

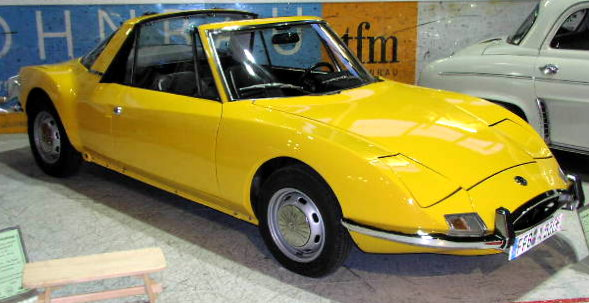
Matra 530 at OFK exhibition, Koenigsbrunn (Germany), 2006

Matra had been involved in car manufacturing since the acquisition of Automobiles René Bonnet in 1963. The first road car to be sold under the Matra marque was the Renault-powered Matra Djet (pronounced "jet"), which was an update of the Bonnet Jet; the Djet was subsequently replaced with the Matra 530, Bagheera, the Murena and the Rancho, an early type of sport utility vehicle (SUV). At its peak, Matra Automobiles was manufacturing 60,000 vehicles per year at its plant in Romorantin-Lanthenay.

Lagardere, recognising the promotion value of the motorsport sector for garnering sales, decided that the company ought to be involved, leading to the creation of Equipe Matra Sports, which entered the French Formula 3 during 1965. Throughout the mid-1960s, Matra enjoyed considerable success in Formula 3 and Formula 2 racing with its MS5 monocoque-based car, winning both the French and European championships. Matra competed as a constructor in Formula One from 1967 to 1972 and as an engine supplier between 1975 and 1982, winning the Drivers' and Constructors' championships in 1969. Matra also competed in sports car racing from 1966 to 1974 winning the 24 Hours of Le Mans outright in 1972, 1973 and 1974 and the World Championship for Makes in 1973 and 1974. However, at the end of the 1974 season, Matra announced that it had decided to withdraw from all motorsport involvement.

During the early 1970s, Matra sold its car division to American-owned car manufacturer Chrysler Europe. Matra Automobiles was subsequently sold by Chrysler Europe to French car company Peugeot; during 1983, Lagardere arranged to buy the division back. Shortly thereafter, a strategic partnership was formed between Matra and French vehicle company Renault, leading to the development of the Espace minivan.

During 1984, the Matra-built Espace was launched onto the market; this car proved to be a commercial success over multiple decades. Due to this success, this single vehicle type became extremely impactful to the fortunes of Matra Automobiles. Following on from the first generation of the Espace, Matra Automobiles went on to manufacture the next two generations as well; however, the fourth iteration was manufactured inhouse by Renault instead. The loss of the Espace business quickly proved detrimental to the firm's finances.

During 2001, production of the Renault Avantime, which was co-designed and built by Matra Automobiles, commenced; this vehicle did not sell well and was widely regarded as a failure. By the early 2000s, Matra was reportedly keen to end its involvement with the automotive industry. Following the discontinuation of the Avantime, on 27 February 2003, Matra Automobiles announced its intention to close its Romorantin vehicle factory just one month later. The dismantling of the division was necessitated by Matra Automobiles having been declared bankrupt.

During September 2003, Pininfarina SpA acquired Matra Automobile's engineering, testing and prototype businesses; the company was subsequently named Matra Automobile Engineering. On 13 January 2009, Pininfarina sold its share in Matra Automobile Engineering to Segula Technologies.

=== Street models ===
- Matra Djet
- Matra 530
- Matra Bagheera
- Matra Murena
- Matra Rancho
- Renault Espace
- Renault Avantime

== Matra Hautes Technologies ==
Matra Hautes Technologies (MHT) was the defence arm of the firm. The division was involved in aerospace, defence and telecommunications.

During 1990, Matra Espace and the aerospace division of British electronics specialist GEC Marconi merged, creating Matra Marconi Space; the company had claimed this entity to have been the leading aerospace company in the European market at the time. Six years later, Matra Défense and British missile manufacturer BAe Dynamics merged to form Matra BAe Dynamics, a leading weapons manufacturer in Europe as well as the third largest in the world at the time. During February 1999, MHT merged with French aerospace conglomerate Aérospatiale to form Aérospatiale-Matra. On 10 July 2000, Aérospatiale-Matra merged with Spanish aircraft company CASA and German aerospace firm DASA to become part of EADS, which subsequently became the Airbus Group.

=== Divisions (as of Aérospatiale merger) ===
- Matra Défense
- Matra Systèmes & Information
- Matra BAe Dynamics (50% British Aerospace), formed in 1996, Matra BAe Dynamics brought together the missile business of BAe (BAe Dynamics) and half of the missile business of Matra Défense. (The other half remained as Aerospatiale Matra Missiles.)
- Matra Marconi Space (49% GEC), was the space division of Matra which merged with the space operations of GEC (Marconi Space Systems) in 1989 to form Matra Marconi Space. In 2000, it was merged with the space division of DaimlerChrysler Aerospace AG (DASA) to form Astrium. This was later renamed to EADS Astrium.
- Matra Nortel Communications (50% Nortel)

=== Weapons produced ===
- R.511 air to air missiles
- R.530 air to air missiles
- Super 530 air to air missiles
- R.550 Magic air to air missiles
- MICA air to air missiles
- R.422 surface to air missiles
- Mistral anti-aircraft missiles
- Martel anti-radar and anti-shipping missiles in association with Hawker Siddeley
- ARMAT anti-radar missiles
- Otomat anti-shipping missiles in association with Oto Melara
- BLG 66 Belouga cluster bombs
- Durandal anti-runway bombs
- Pods for the SNEB unguided rocket
