= Matra BAe Dynamics =

European defense manufacturer

Matra BAe Dynamics was an Anglo-French 50/50 joint venture formed in August 1996 through a merger between half the missile business of France's Matra Hautes Technologies (the aerospace, defence and telecommunications division of the Matra conglomerate) and the missile activities of the UK's BAe Dynamics (a division of British Aerospace). During its 5 years of existence, it was Europe`s largest guided weapons company and the third largest in the world.

British Aerospace had previously sought to merge its missile business with that of France's Thomson-CSF (now Thales Group). The companies announced their plan to create a new combined company called Eurodynamics in 1989. However, after more than a year of monopoly investigations, the deal collapsed. The formation of Matra BAe Dynamics was followed in 1997 by the acquisition of a 30% share in LFK.

In 1999, the other half of Matra Hautes Technologies' missile business (Matra Missiles) combined with the missile systems division of the French corporation Aérospatiale to form Aérospatiale Matra Missiles following the merger between Aérospatiale and Matra Hautes Technologies. This new giant, Aérospatiale-Matra, also gained ownership of Matra's 50% share in Matra BAe Dynamics as a result of the merger.

Matra BAe Dynamics ultimately merged with Aérospatiale Matra Missiles and the missile activities of Alenia Marconi Systems to form MBDA in December 2001.
