= Rietkol =

- Location within Mpumalanga Location within South Africa
- Coordinates: 26.152°S 28.548°E
- Country: South Africa
- Province: Mpumalanga
- District: Nkangala
- Municipality: Victor Khanye

Area
  - Total: 9.98 km^{2} (3.85 sq mi)

Population (2011)
  - Total: 2,812
  - Density: 282/km^{2} (730/sq mi)

Racial makeup (2011)
  - Black African: 36.5%
  - Coloured: 0.6%
  - Indian/Asian: 1.1%
  - White: 61.3%
  - Other: 0.5%

First languages (2011)
  - Afrikaans: 56.3%
  - Zulu: 13.9%
  - English: 11.2%
  - Tsonga: 3.8%
  - Other: 14.8%
- Time zone: UTC+2 (SAST)
- PO box: 2200

Rietkol is a town in Victor Khanye Local Municipality in the Mpumalanga province of South Africa.
