= Nilesat 102 =

Egyptian communications satellite

Coordinates: 0°N 7°W

- Mission type: Communications
- Operator: Nilesat
- COSPAR ID: 2000-046B
- SATCAT no.: 26470
- Mission duration: 18 years

Spacecraft properties
- Bus: Eurostar-2000
- Manufacturer: Matra Marconi
- Launch mass: 1,827 kilograms (4,028 lb)
- Power: watts

Start of mission
- Launch date: 17 August 2000, 23:16:00 UTC
- Rocket: Ariane 44LP
- Launch site: Kourou ELA-2
- Contractor: Arianespace

Orbital parameters
- Reference system: Geocentric
- Regime: Geostationary
- Longitude: 7° West
- Perigee altitude: 35,773 kilometres (22,228 mi)
- Apogee altitude: 35,810 kilometres (22,250 mi)
- Inclination: 0.02 degrees
- Period: 23.93 hours
- Epoch: 30 October 2013, 02:26:06 UTC

Transponders
- Band: 12 Ku-band

Nilesat 102 is an Egyptian owned geosynchronous communications satellite that was launched by an Ariane 44LP rocket from Kourou, French Guiana on August 17, 2000, at 23:16 UTC by the European Space Agency. It was manufactured by the European company Matra Marconi Space (Astrium), and started official broadcasting on 12 September 2000 with an expected lifetime of 15 years. The spacecraft weighed 1,827 kg at launch.

== Manufacture ==
It was manufactured by the European company Matra Marconi Space (Astrium). At launch, the spacecraft weighed 1,827 kg (fully fuelled). The receiver dish diameter is 50 cm to 75 cm. The transponder output power is 100 W and 12 Ku-band transponders with a bandwidth of 33 MHz. The maximum power consumption is 3.06 kW. The satellite utilizes a three-axis stabilization system. The satellite is powered by two deployable solar arrays, with the power being stored on batteries.

== Launch ==
Nilesat 102 was launched by an Ariane 44LP rocket from Kourou, French Guiana on August 17, 2000, at 23:16 UTC by the European Space Agency.

== Mission ==
=== Operations ===
Nilesat 102 is operated by the Egyptian satellite Co. Nilesat, which was established in 1996 with the purpose of operating Egyptian satellites and their associated mission control center and ground stations. The two control centers are located in Cairo and Alexandria.

The two satellites carried more than 150 TV channels, adding 50 more channels than when only Nilesat 101 was operational. Additional services provided include data transmission, turbo internet, and multicasting operations.

== End of Mission ==
Nilesat 102 was retired in June 2018 and moved to a graveyard orbit.
