= British Aerospace Space Systems =

British Aerospace Space Systems Ltd was a subsidiary of British Aerospace.

In 1994, it was sold to Matra Marconi Space, which also acquired Ferranti Satcomms at the same time. British Aerospace regained an interest in the company when it merged with GEC's Marconi Electronic Systems to form BAE Systems. In 2000, Matra Marconi was merged with the space division of DaimlerChrysler Aerospace AG (DASA) to form Astrium. BAE sold its 25% stake in June 2003 and the company became EADS Astrium.

Projects which BAe Space Systems was involved in include the earliest Eutelsat satellites.
