= BPL Group =

Indian electronics manufacturer

BPL Ltd.
- Company type: Public
- Traded as: BSE: 500074; NSE: BPL
- Industry: Electronics
- Founded: 1963; 63 years ago at Palakkad, Kerala, India
- Founder: T. P. G. Nambiar
- Headquarters: Dynamic House, Church Street Bangalore, Karnataka, India
- Products: Medical equipment; Television; Refrigerator; Washing machine; Microwave oven; Audio equipment; Air conditioners
- Revenue: ₹118.50 crore (US$12 million)
- Operating income: ₹90 crore (US$9.4 million)
- Net income: ₹77 crore (US$8.0 million) (Extraordinary income inclusive)
- Website: bpl.in

British Physical Laboratories, doing business as BPL Ltd., is an Indian electronics company. It makes consumer electronics and health care equipment. It was founded in 1963 in Palakkad, Kerala, and is headquartered at Bangalore, Karnataka.

== History ==
British Physical Laboratories India Pvt. Ltd. was founded in 1963, during the Licence Raj, by T. P. Gopalan Nambiar in Palakkad, Kerala, as a company for manufacturing hermetically sealed precision panel meters for the defence forces. Nambiar had worked in the United Kingdom and United States, and when he returned to India, he desired to create a company that manufactured high-quality electronic products, and he wanted to make BPL a household name. The initial products were precision measuring instruments such as hermetic sealed panel meters for Bharat Electronics as a subcontract for Indian Army. The newly founded company was joint venture with the British company of the same name.

Then BPL expanded its medical product ranges to include electrocardiographs and patient-monitoring systems. After the 1982 Asian Games, BPL expanded its range further and manufactured colour televisions and video cassette recorders, and later refrigerators, batteries and other consumer electrical equipment.

The company headquarters was moved to Dynamic House, Church Street, Bangalore. From medical electronics, it expanded into consumer electronics, telecommunications, soft energy and electronic components.

=== 1980s ===
From 1980 onwards, when the industrial licensing was relaxed, BPL began manufacturing televisions and telecommunications equipment, demonstrating its potential and future business area. It began collaborating with the Japanese Sanyo Electric Company in the early 1980s with a technology-transfer agreement. In the early 1990s, after globalisation and liberalization of the Indian economy, competition entered the market. BPL retained its strong presence and growth rate. During the late 1990s, the company's annual revenue peaked at ₹4,300 crore (equivalent to ₹190 billion or US$2.0 billion in 2023).

BPL concentrated on importing technology, improving product quality, innovations and manufacturing of electronic products. In late 1980s, BPL had metamorphosed from an entrepreneurial venture, into India's biggest consumer electronics & telecommunication company.

Following economic liberalisation in India in 1991, BPL faced increased competition from South Korean companies LG and Samsung. Internal disputes within the controlling family took away attention from external threats, and the company's fortunes declined. By 2004, BPL and Sanyo were facing serious financial problems due to intense competition in the global electronics market. In 2005, the companies announced a joint-venture, and BPL transferred its colour television business, then worth US$80 million, to the new venture.

BPL was restructured with a focus on energy, healthcare, consumer electronics and home security systems. In 2015, BPL partnered with Flipkart as an online retailer. In 2016, BPL launched new LED TVs (32 Inch, 40 inch and more) with a very economical price through E-commerce websites like Flipkart and Amazon.

== Performance ==
BPL Ltd has reported a net loss of ₹34.76 crore (equivalent to ₹112 crore or US$12 million in 2023) in the second quarter of fiscal 2005–06, on gross sales of ₹34.71 crore (equivalent to ₹111 crore or US$12 million in 2023). Operating losses were at ₹13.91 crore (equivalent to ₹45 crore or US$4.7 million in 2023).

Gross sales were ₹64.45 crore (equivalent to ₹219 crore or US$23 million in 2023) in the corresponding period during 2004-05 while net loss was at ₹41.59 crore (equivalent to ₹141 crore or US$15 million in 2023).

According to the company, the promoters have brought in ₹50.08 crore (equivalent to ₹170 crore or US$18 million in 2023) as contemplated in the corporate debt restructuring scheme. The amount was to pay statutory liabilities, unsecured, pressing creditors, dealers, credit balances, employee dues and working capital requirements, in part.

In respect to the auditors' qualification of the company's accounts for the period ended 31 March 2005, about undisputed amounts payable in respect of income-tax (₹4.44 crore (equivalent to ₹15 crore or US$1.6 million in 2023)), dividend tax (₹2.51 crore (equivalent to ₹8.5 crore or US$890,000 in 2023)), wealth tax (₹0.11 crore (equivalent to ₹3.7 million or US$39,000 in 2023)), TDS (₹6.77 crore (equivalent to ₹22 crore or US$2.3 million in 2023)) and customs duty (₹1.68 crore (equivalent to ₹5.7 crore or US$600,000 in 2023)).

The balance in customs duty would be paid once the financial restructuring is completed and normalcy of operations is achieved, according to the company.

== Joint venture with Sanyo ==
The BPL Group and Japanese electronics major Sanyo Electric Company Ltd formally started their 50:50 joint venture.

The partners, who had shared a long-standing relationship since 1982, had been off the market for about two years, going through some tough times. In the year 2006, they decided to get back in action together to regain lost market share.

While unveiling the Joint Venture's plans, Sanyo-BPL Pvt Ltd Chairman and chief executive officer, Ajit G Nambiar, said the company expected to post revenues of around ₹2,000 crore (equivalent to ₹50 billion or US$520 million in 2023) by 2009 and lead the market in consumer electronics and white goods in five years.

However, they decided to market their brands separately with BPL focusing on the volume segment while Sanyo brand positioned itself as the value driver.

Besides, Sanyo also planned to use India as its sourcing base and has already started sourcing slim TVs from India. It also expected India to contribute five per cent of its global revenues from its operations in India.

In May 2007 after the failure of Sanyo BPL venture. The attrition rate in Sanyo BPL was 70%. BPL concentrated 100% on Healthcare Business group which has its own manufacturing of electromedical equipment such as electrocardiography apparatus and patient monitors.

== BPL Medical Technologies ==
BPL Medical Technologies was spun off into a separate company in 2013. In May 2013, Goldman Sachs purchased a 49% stake in the new company for ₹110 crore (equivalent to ₹187 crore or US$20 million in 2023).

== See also ==
- Loop Mobile, formerly BPL Mobile
- Rajeev Chandrasekhar
