= Eurofighter Typhoon procurement =

European fighter aircraft programme

Eurofighter Typhoon procurement is the planned selection and purchase of the Eurofighter Typhoon jet fighter by various countries.

The Typhoon was conceived from the start of the project as a collaborative venture by several European countries under the Eurofighter GmbH consortium. Initial participants in the Future European Fighter Aircraft programme were the UK, Germany, France, Italy and Spain, but France later withdrew.

Since then, several other countries have shown interest in the procurement of the Eurofighter Typhoon.

== Procured aircraft ==
=== Summary ===
Operators	Eurofighter Typhoon Orders						Eurofighter Typhoon Deliveries						Notes
Operators	Tranche 1	Tranche 2	Tranche 3 / 3A	Tranche 4	Tranche 5	Total	Tranche 1	Tranche 2	Tranche 3 / 3A	Tranche 4	Tranche 5	Total	Notes
Austria	15	–	–	–	–	15	15	–	–	–	–	15	
Germany	33	79	31	38	20	201	33	79	31	0 +38	0 +20	143	
Italy	28	47	21	–	24	120	28	47	21	–	0 +24	96	
Kuwait	–	–	28	–	–	28	–	–	15 (+13)	–	–	15	
Oman	–	–	12	–	–	12	–	–	12	–	–	12	
Qatar	–	–	24	12	–	36	–	–	22 (+2)	0 +12	–	22	
Saudi Arabia	0	48	24	–	–	72	–	48	24	–	–	72	
Spain	19	34	20	20	25	118	19	34	20	0 +20	0 +25	73	
Turkey	–	–	–	–	20+20	20	–	–	–	–	0 +20	0	
United Kingdom	53	67	40	–	–	160	53	67	40	–	–	160	
TOTAL	148	275	200	90	69	782	148	275	185	0	0	608	

To be delivered

=== Primary customers ===
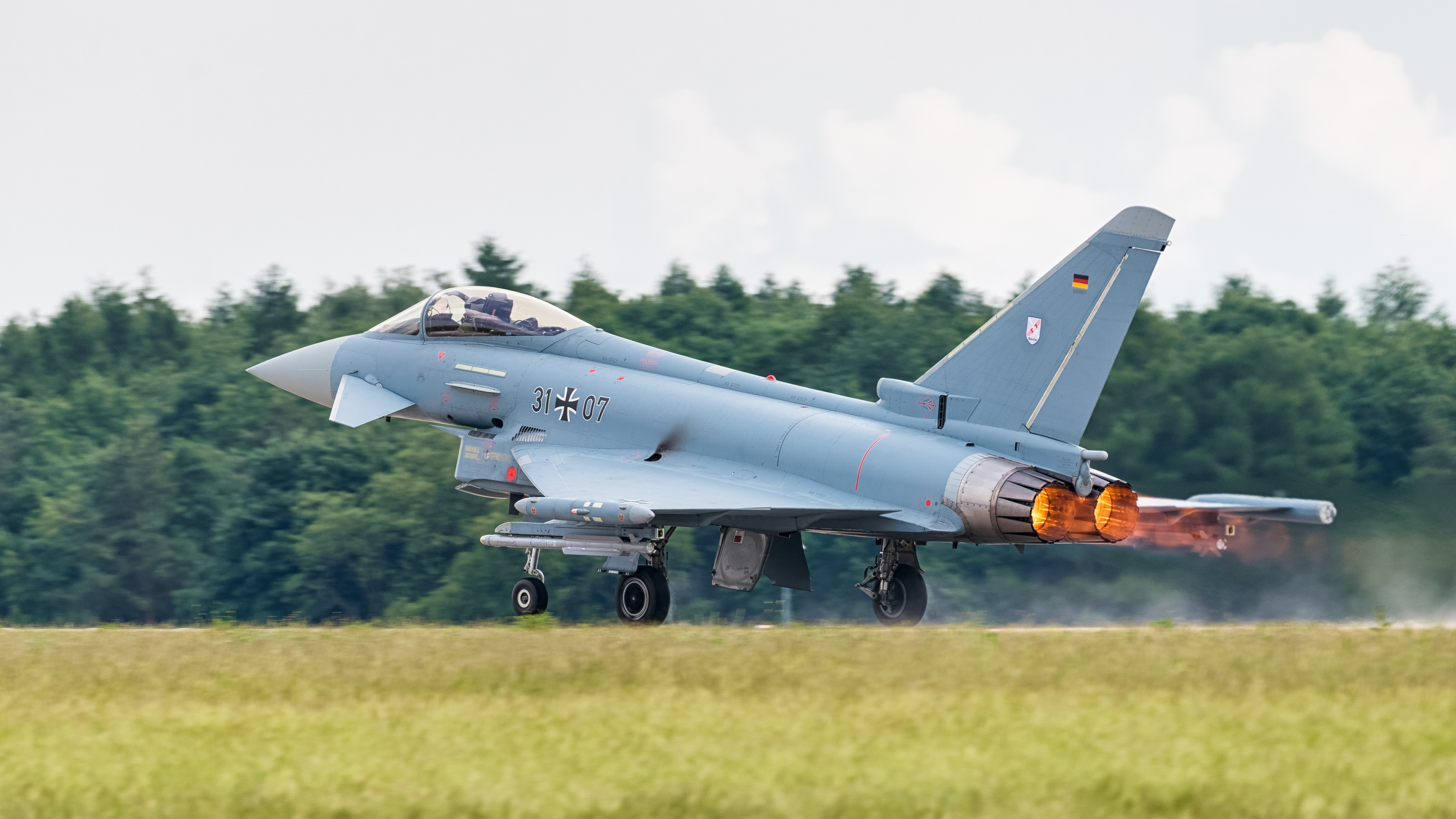
EF2000 of the German Air Force

==== Germany (143 + 58 on order) ====
On 4 August 2003, Germany accepted the first series production Eurofighter (GT003).

The final Tranche 3A aircraft was delivered in 2019.

As part of the replacement of the Tornado, Germany made several decisions:

- Replacement of the Tornado ECR: For this programme, the Eurofighter was in competition with the Boeing E/A-18G Growler. For the SEAD, DEAD and electronic warfare missions, Germany decided to adapt 15 of its Typhoons in November 2023. This new variant is known as the Eurofighter EK / ECR.
- Replacement of the Tornado IDS and Eurofighter T1: A part of the fleet was replaced by 35 F-35A for the NATO nuclear deterrence mission. The rest of the fleet will be replaced by the Eurofighter Quadriga. A first order was placed in 2020 for:
  - 30 single-seat Typhoon T4
  - 8 twin-seat Typhoon T4
- As part of the replacement of the Panavia Tornado, Germany was still looking for fighter bombers. At ILA Berlin 2024, the Chancellor announced that Germany would order 20 additional Typhoons. The order was planned for the end of the legislative session in Autumn 2025. In October 2025, the purchase of 20 Eurofighter Tranche 5 was approved by the parliament.

==== Italy (96 + 24 on order) ====
Italy operates the Eurofighter EF-2000 Typhoon.

The final Tranche 3A aircraft was delivered in 2020.

24 additional Eurofighter ordered in 2024 to replace the T1.

==== Spain (73 + 45 on order) ====
In 2003, Spain took delivery of its first series production aircraft.

The final Tranche 3A aircraft was delivered in 2019.

The Halcon programme was launched to replace the F/A-18 A/B of the Spanish Air Force:

- Halcon I: In November 2023, 20 Eurofighter T4 ordered.
- Halcon II: In November 2024, 25 Eurofighter T4+ ordered

==== United Kingdom (160) ====
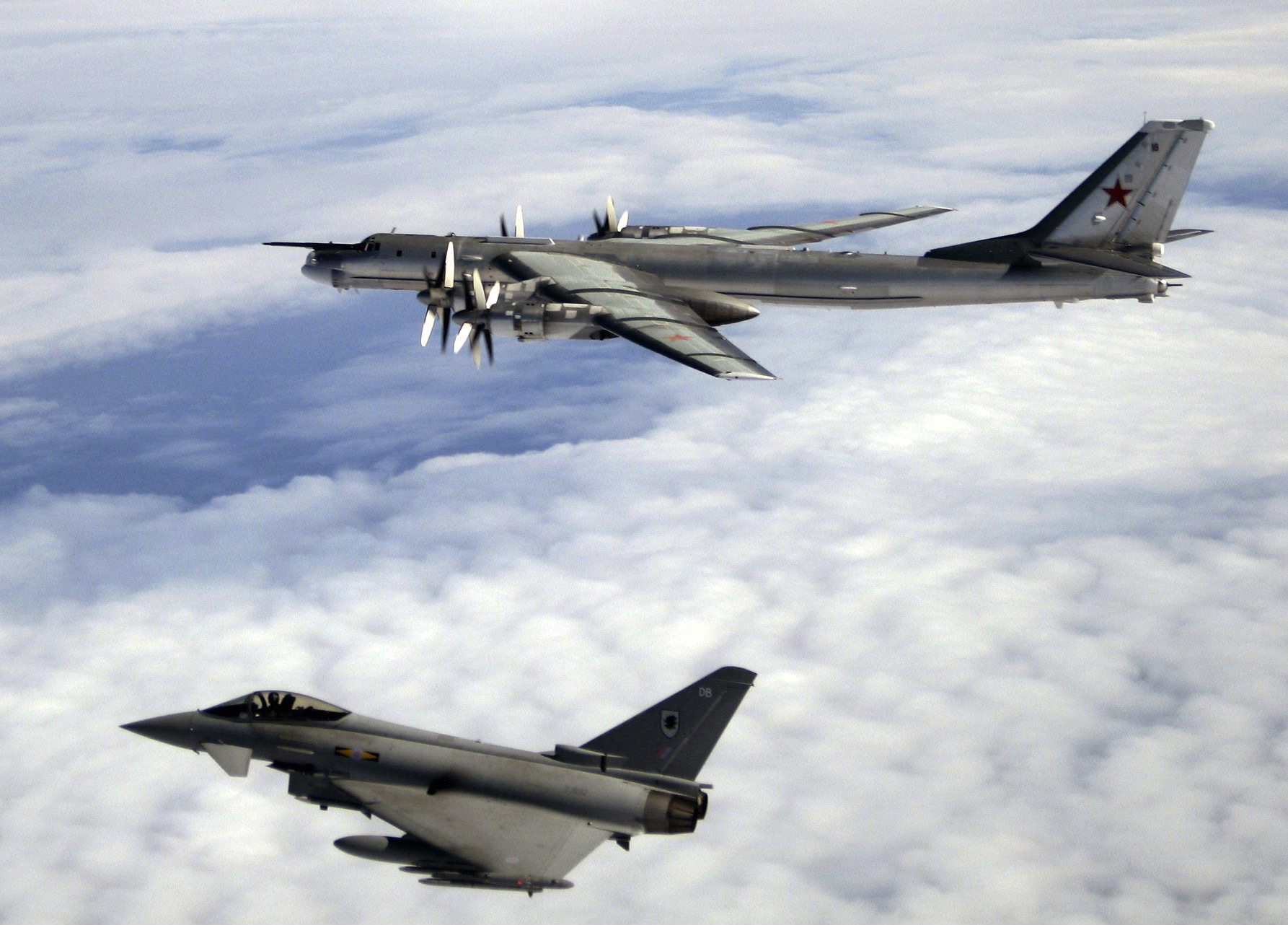
A Quick Reaction Alert (QRA) Typhoon F2 from Number XI Squadron at RAF Coningsby is pictured escorting a Russian Tupolev Tu-95 aircraft over the North Atlantic Ocean.

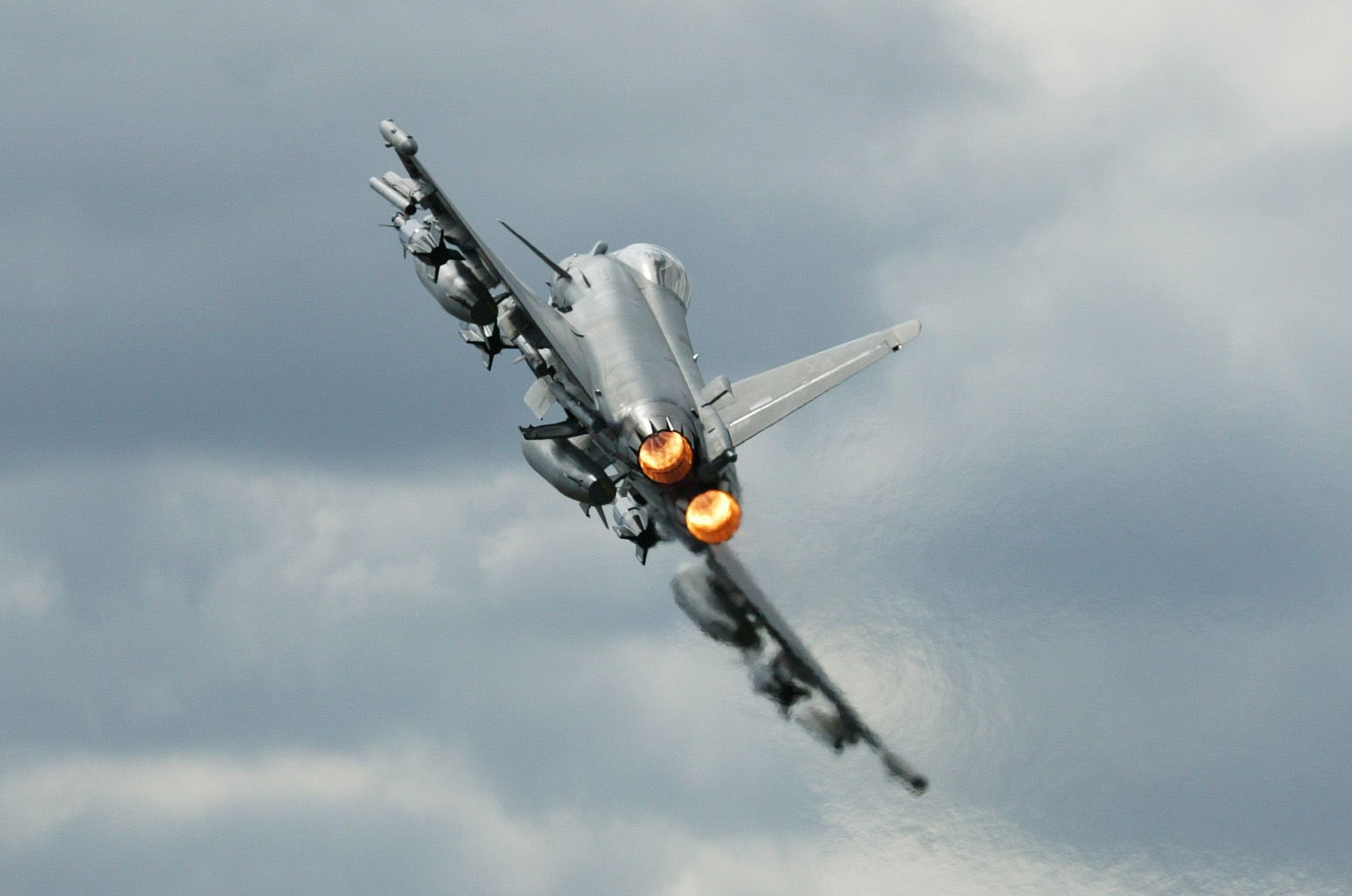
British Typhoon at Farnborough 2010

On 9 August 2007, the UK's Ministry of Defence reported that No. 11 Squadron RAF of the RAF, which stood up as a Typhoon squadron on 29 March 2007, had taken delivery of its first two multi-role Typhoons. The RAF Typhoons were declared combat ready in the air-to-ground role by 1 July 2008. The RAF Typhoons were projected to be ready to deploy for operations by mid-2008.

In July 2012, UK Defence Secretary Philip Hammond suggested that a follow-on buy of F-35A aircraft would be determined by the Strategic Defence and Security Review in 2015, with the aim of replacing the UK's Typhoons around 2030. The UK is to decide what mix of manned and unmanned aircraft will replace its Eurofighters sometime between 2015 and 2020.

It was announced in December 2013 that No. 2 Squadron would be the fifth Typhoon Squadron to convert from the Panavia Tornado and reform at RAF Lossiemouth from 1 April 2015.

By July 2014, a dozen RAF Tranche 2 Typhoons had been upgraded with Phase 1 Enhancement (P1E) capability to enable them to use the Paveway IV guided bomb; the Tranche 1 version had used the GBU-12 Paveway II in combat over Libya, but the Paveway IV can be set to explode above or beneath a target and to hit at a set angle. The British are aiming to upgrade their Typhoons to be able to carry the Storm Shadow cruise missile and Brimstone air-to-ground missile by 2018 to ensure they have manned aircraft configured with strike capabilities with trained crews by the time the Tornado GR4 is retired the following year; the Defence Ministry is funding research for a common launcher system that could also drop the Selective Precision Effects at Range (Spear) III networked precision-guided weapon from the Typhoon, which is already planned for the F-35. RAF Tranche 1 Typhoons are too structurally and technically different from later models so the British have decided that, beginning in 2015 or 2016, the older models will be switched out for Tranche 2 and 3 versions, a process that will remove the Tranche 1 aircraft from service around 2020 to be stripped for parts to support newer versions.

In the 2015 Strategic Defense and Security Review (SDSR), it was decided to retain some of the Tranche 1 aircraft to increase the number of front-line squadrons from five to seven and to boost the out-of-service date from 2030 to 2040 as well as implement the Captor-E AESA radar in later tranches.

The final Tranche 3A aircraft was delivered in 2019.

In 2021 it was decided to retire the Tranche 1 Typhoons by 2025.

=== Export ===
==== Austria (15) ====
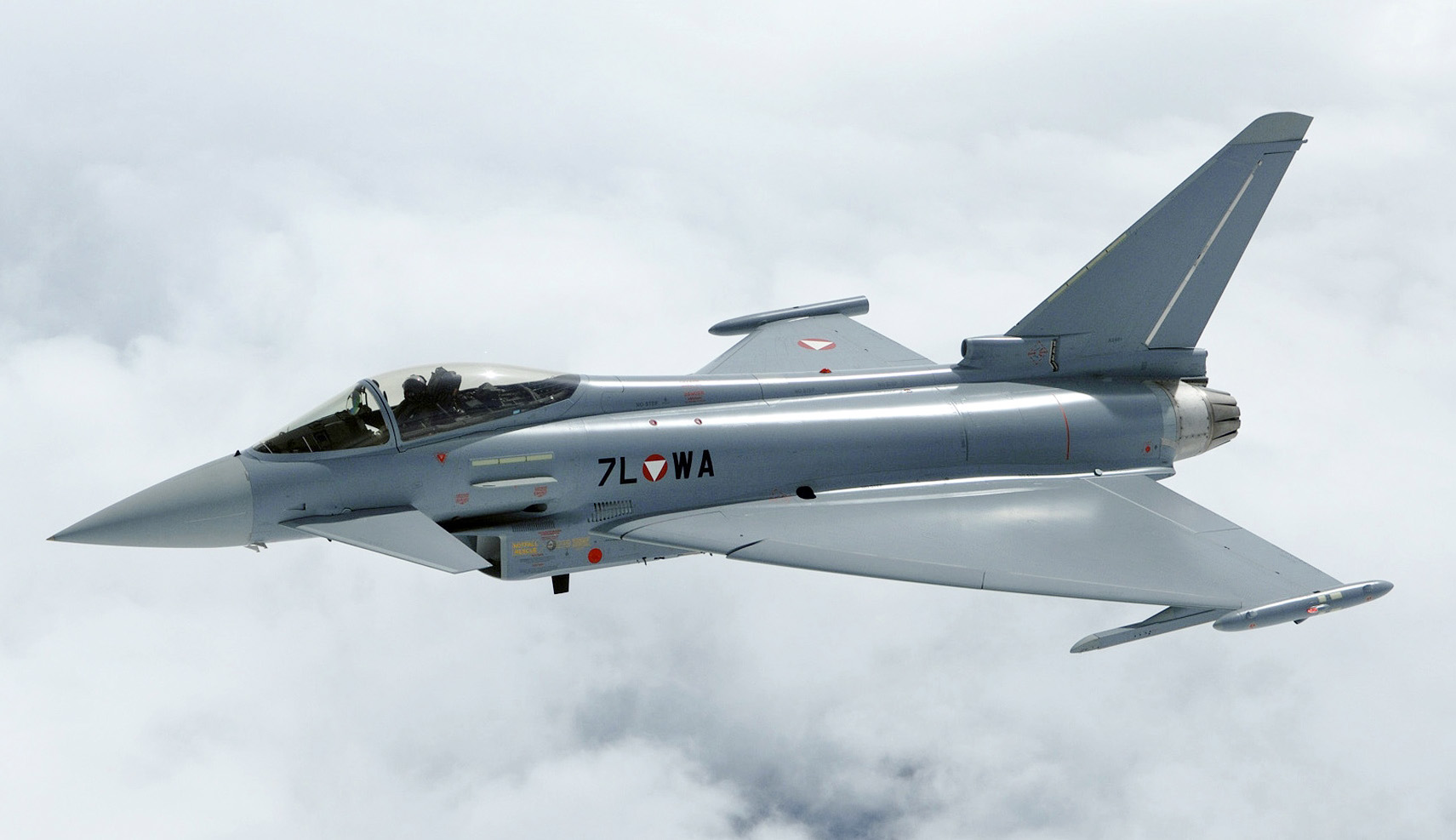
Austrian Air Force Typhoon in flight

On 2 July 2002 the Austrian government announced its decision to buy the Typhoon as its new air defence aircraft, it having beaten the General Dynamics F-16 and the Saab JAS 39 Gripen in competition. The purchase of 18 Typhoons was agreed upon on 1 July 2003, and included training, logistics, maintenance and a simulator. On 26 June 2007 Austrian Minister for Defense Norbert Darabos announced a reduction to 15 aircraft. The first aircraft was delivered on 12 July 2007 and formally entered service in the Austrian Air Force. A 2008 report by the Austrian government oversight office, the Rechnungshof, calculated that instead of getting 18 Tranche 2 jets at a price of €109 million each, as stipulated by the original contract, the revised deal agreed by Minister Darabos meant that Austria was paying an increased unit price of €114 million for 15 partially used, Tranche 1 jets.

Austrian prosecutors are investigating allegations that up to €100 million was made available to lobbyists to influence the original purchase decision in favour of the Eurofighter. By October 2013, all Typhoons in service with Austria had been upgraded to the latest Tranche 1 standard. In 2014, due to defense budget restrictions, there were only 12 pilots available to fly the 15 aircraft in Austria's Air Force. In February 2017, Austrian Defense Minister Hans Peter Doskozil accused Airbus of fraudulent intent following a probe that allegedly unveiled corruption linked to the order of Typhoon jets.

In July 2017, the Austrian Defense Ministry announced that it would be replacing all of its Typhoon aircraft by 2020. The ministry said that continued use of its Typhoons over their 30-year life–span would cost about €5 billion with the bulk being for maintenance. It estimated that buying a new fleet of 15 single–seat and 3 twin–seat fighters would save €2 billion over that period. Austria plans to explore a government-to-government sale or lease agreement to avoid a lengthy and costly tender process with a manufacturer. Possible replacements include the Saab Gripen and the F-16.

The Austrian courts ended the fraud case in 2020 due to lack of evidence.

==== Kuwait (28) ====
In June 2015, it was reported that Kuwait was in talks with the Italian Air Force and Alenia Aermacchi about the potential purchase of up to 28 Eurofighter Typhoons for two squadrons. On 11 September 2015, Eurofighter confirmed that an agreement had been reached to supply Kuwait with 28 aircraft. On 1 March 2016, the Kuwaiti National Assembly approved the procurement of 22 single-seat and six twin-seat Typhoons, which will be assembled at Caselle, Italy. On 5 April 2016, Kuwait signed a contract with Leonardo valued at €7.957 billion (US$9.062 billion) for the supply of the 28 aircraft, all to third tranche standard. The Kuwaiti aircraft will be the first Typhoons to receive the Captor-E active electronically scanned array radar, with two instrumented production aircraft from the UK and Germany currently undergoing ground-based integration trials. The Typhoons will be fitted with Leonardo's Praetorian defensive aid suite and the PIRATE infrared search and track system. The contract involves the production of aircraft in Italy and covers logistics, operational support and the training of flight crews and ground personnel. It also encompasses infrastructure work at the Ali Al Salem Air Base, where the Typhoons will be based. Aircraft deliveries will begin in 2020.

==== Oman (12) ====
During the 2008 Farnborough Airshow it was announced that Oman was in an "advanced stage" of discussions towards purchasing Typhoons as a replacement for its SEPECAT Jaguar aircraft. Through 2010 Oman remained interested in ordering Typhoons. though the Saab JAS 39 Gripen was also being considered. In the interim Oman ordered 12 additional F-16s in December 2011. On 21 December 2012, the Royal Air Force of Oman became the Typhoon's seventh customer when BAE Systems and Oman announced an order for 12 Typhoons to enter service in 2017. The first of the Typhoons (plus Hawk Mk 166) ordered by Oman were, according to a BAE Systems' press release, "formally presented to the customer" on 15 May 2017. The presentation included a flypast by a Royal Air Force of Oman Typhoon.

==== Qatar (24 + 12) ====
From January 2011 the Qatar Air Force evaluated the Typhoon, alongside the Boeing F/A-18E/F Super Hornet, the McDonnell Douglas F-15E Strike Eagle, the Dassault Rafale, and the Lockheed Martin F-35 Lightning II, to replace its then inventory of Dassault Mirage 2000-5s. By June 2014 Dassault claimed it was close to signing a contract with Qatar for 72 Rafales. On 30 April 2015 Sheikh Tamim bin Hamad Al Thani announced to President François Hollande that Qatar would order 24 Rafales.

On 17 September 2017 the UK government announced that Qatar had signed a Statement of Intent to procure 24 Eurofighter Typhoons. On 28 November, Chris Boardman, managing director of BAE Systems Military Air and Information business, told the British Parliament's Defence Select Committee that negotiations between the UK and Qatar, for the purchase of Typhoon fighters (and Hawk jet trainers) were complete, and the two sides were looking for a suitable date to sign the deal. On 10 December a deal for Qatar to buy 24 jets, including a support and training package from BAE, with deliveries due to start in 2022, was announced in Doha by Defence Secretary Gavin Williamson and his Qatari counterpart, Khalid bin Mohammed al Attiyah.

In September 2018, Qatar made the first payment for the procurement of 24 Eurofighter Typhoons and 9 BAE Hawk aircraft to BAE Systems, making the contract effective according to BAE.

In December 2024, the Qatari Air Force confirmed the purchase of 12 additional Typhoon.

==== Saudi Arabia (72) ====
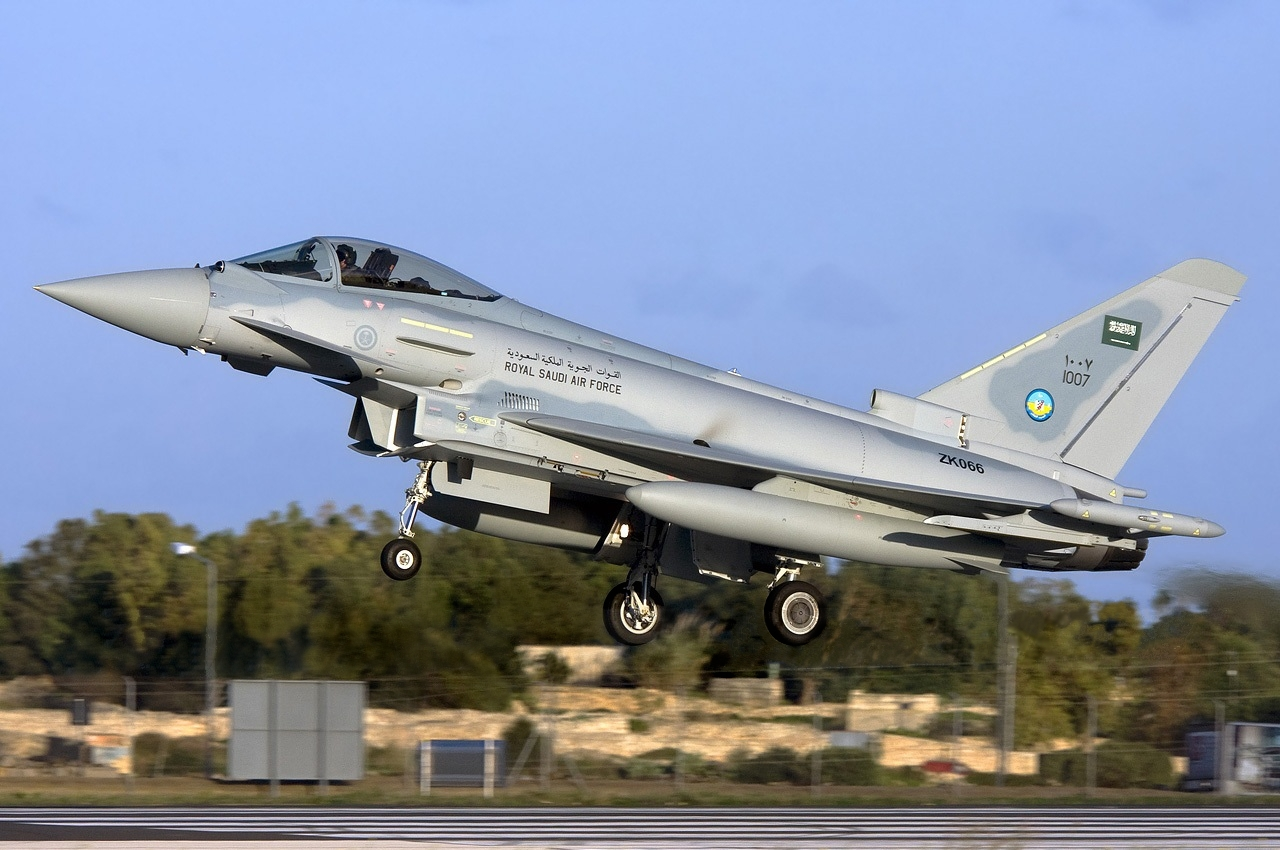
Saudi Arabian Typhoon, 2009

On 18 August 2006 it was announced that Saudi Arabia had agreed to purchase 72 Typhoons. In December 2006 it was reported in The Guardian that Saudi Arabia had threatened to buy Dassault Rafales because of a UK Serious Fraud Office investigation into the Al Yamamah ("the dove") defence deals which commenced in the 1980s.

On 14 December 2006, Britain's attorney general, Lord Goldsmith, ordered that the Serious Fraud Office discontinue its investigation into BAE Systems' alleged bribery of senior Saudi officials in the al-Yamamah contracts, citing "the need to safeguard national and international security". The Times raised the possibility that RAF production aircraft would be diverted as early Saudi Arabian aircraft, with the RAF forced to wait for its full complement of aircraft. This arrangement would mirror the diversion of RAF Panavia Tornados to the Royal Saudi Air Force (RSAF). The Times also reported that such an arrangement would make the UK purchase of its Tranche 3 commitments more likely. On 17 September 2007, Saudi Arabia confirmed it had signed a GB£4.43 billion contract for 72 aircraft. Twenty-four aircraft would be at the Tranche 2 build standard, previously destined for the UK RAF, the first being delivered in 2008. The remaining 48 aircraft were to be assembled in Saudi Arabia and delivered in 2011, but following contract renegotiations in 2011 it was agreed that all 72 aircraft would be assembled by BAE Systems in the UK, with the last 24 aircraft being built to Tranche 3 capability. Saudi Arabia was reported to be considering an order of 24 additional jets. Later reports revised that number to as high as 60 or 72, but this may have been superseded by Saudi Arabia's decision in August 2010 to purchase 84 new F-15SAs.

On 29 September 2008 the United States Department of State approved the Typhoon sale, required because of a certain technology governed by the International Traffic in Arms Regulations process which was incorporated into the Multifunctional Information Distribution System of the Eurofighter.

On 22 October 2008, the first Typhoon in the colours of the Royal Saudi Air Force flew for the first time at BAE Systems' Warton Aerodrome, marking the start of the test flight programme for RSAF aircraft. Following the official handover of the first Typhoon to the RSAF on 11 June 2009, the delivery ferry flight took place on 23 June 2009. Since 2010, BAE Systems has been training Saudi Arabian personnel at its factory in Warton, in preparation for setting up an assembly plant in Saudi Arabia.

By 2011, 24 Tranche 2 Eurofighter Typhoons had been delivered to Saudi Arabia, consisting of 18 single-seat and 6 two-seat aircraft. After that, BAE and Riyadh entered into discussions over configurations and price of the rest of the 72-aircraft order. Deliveries resumed in early 2013 with the discussions still going on, with four trainers and two more single-seat Typhoons handed over. On 19 February 2014, BAE announced that the Saudis had agreed to a price increase. BAE Systems announced that the last of the original 72 Typhoons had been delivered to Saudi Arabia in June 2017 .

In October 2016, it was reported that BAE Systems was in talks with Saudi Arabia over an order for another 48 aircraft. On 9 March 2018, a memorandum of intent for the additional 48 Typhoons was signed during Saudi Crown Prince Mohammed bin Salman's visit to the United Kingdom.

==== Turkey (20) ====
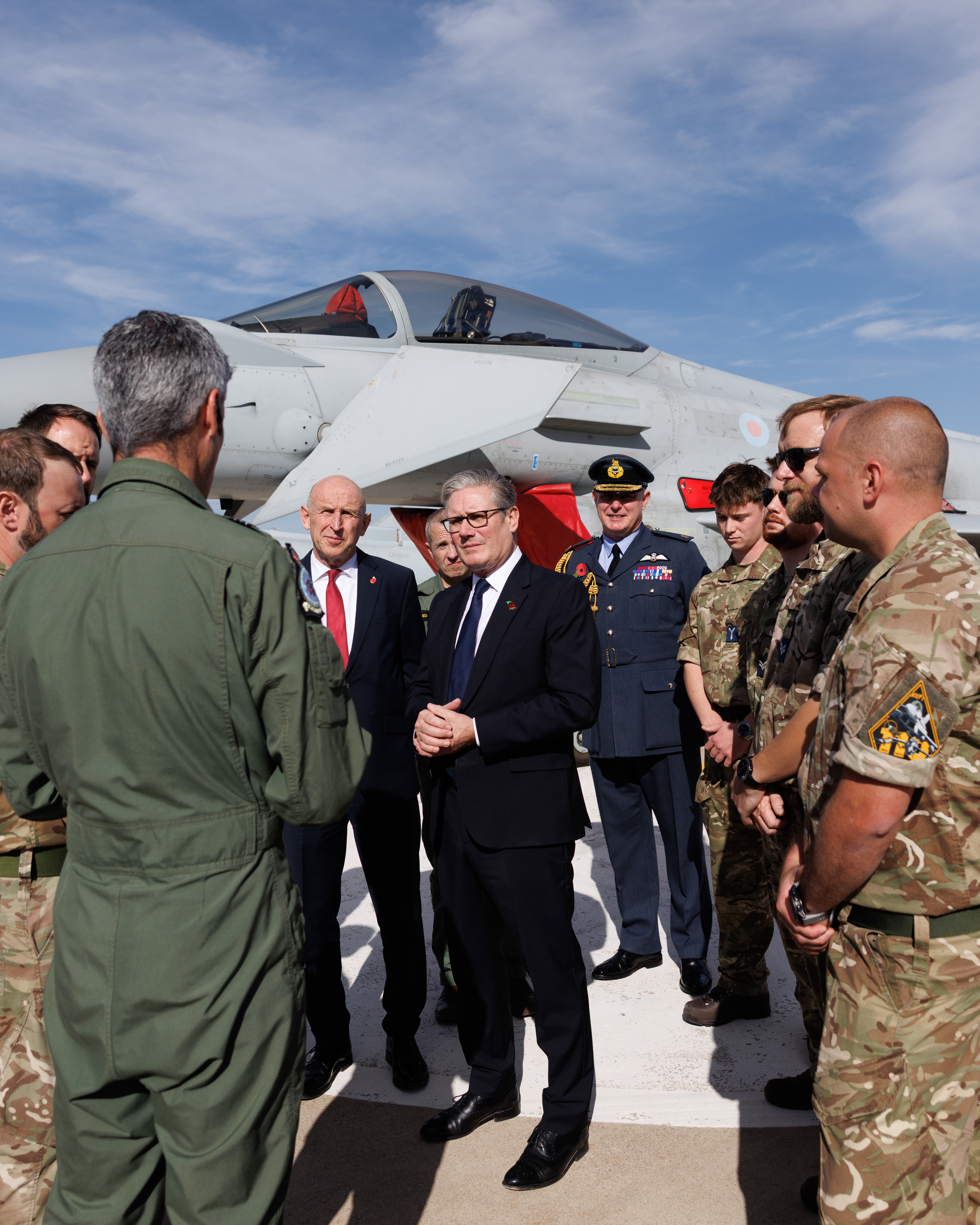
Prime Minister Keir Starmer meets Typhoon pilots and engineers alongside Defence Secretary John Healey in Türkiye

The first pitch of the aircraft to Turkey was in 2006 when Italy offered a fleet of jets and a local production deal. Ankara instead went ahead to join F-35 development program.

In 2022, Turkey expected the United States to approve a proposed sale of new F-16V jets and modernisation kits in return for Ankara finally green-lighting Sweden's admission into NATO. Defense Minister Yaşar Güler underscored Turkey's continued interest in acquiring Typhoons, saying that they remain a compelling alternative, despite recent disagreements with Germany over the potential purchase. "If we can realize the issues we talked about with our friends, maybe we won't need it, but we do now. The Eurofighter is a very good alternative, and we want to buy it," Güler said in a televised interview with private broadcaster NTV on 11 December 2023. It was revealed in November 2023 that Turkey was in talks with the United Kingdom and Spain over procuring 40 Typhoons. Any sale would require Germany's approval, which is not forthcoming. President Erdoğan has been in Germany since the negotiations were revealed, but is reported not to have raised the issue with German Chancellor Olaf Scholz.

In November 2024, Turkish Defence Minister Yaşar Güler said, "We will buy 40 Eurofighter Typhoon Tranch 5 ECRS Mk2 fighter jets", crediting Italy, Spain, and the UK for their support in persuading Germany, which had resisted the sale for years. In March 2025, the UK formally submitted a proposal from BAE Systems to Turkey for the purchase of 40 jets. In April 2025, German news sources claimed that the German government was blocking the export of the Typhoon to Turkey, expressing concerns over recent political developments, especially the arrest of opposition Istanbul Mayor Ekrem İmamoğlu. However, the Ministry of National Defense and the German government denied the allegations. It was said that the sale of the Eurofighter Typhoons was a decision left to the new German government, which viewed the sale of weapons positively. Germany cleared the sale of Typhoons to Turkey on 23 July 2025, with Turkey and UK signed a memorandum of understanding for the aircraft acquisition on the same day.

In October 2025, Erdoğan travelled to Doha to discuss the purchase of 24 second hand Typhoons. On 27 October, Starmer travelled to Ankara to meet with Turkish President Erdoğan, where the two signed an agreement in which the UK would sell 20 Typhoons and associated equipment to Turkey in a deal worth up to £8 billion, which is later revised to £5.4 billion. The agreement marked Britain’s biggest fighter-jet deal for almost two decades, and Turkey’s first purchase of combat aircraft from a country other than the US. Defense Minister Yaşar Güler announced that 12 second-hand Typhoons are to be purchased from Qatar and Oman, bringing the total number of Typhoons to 44.

== Potential sales ==
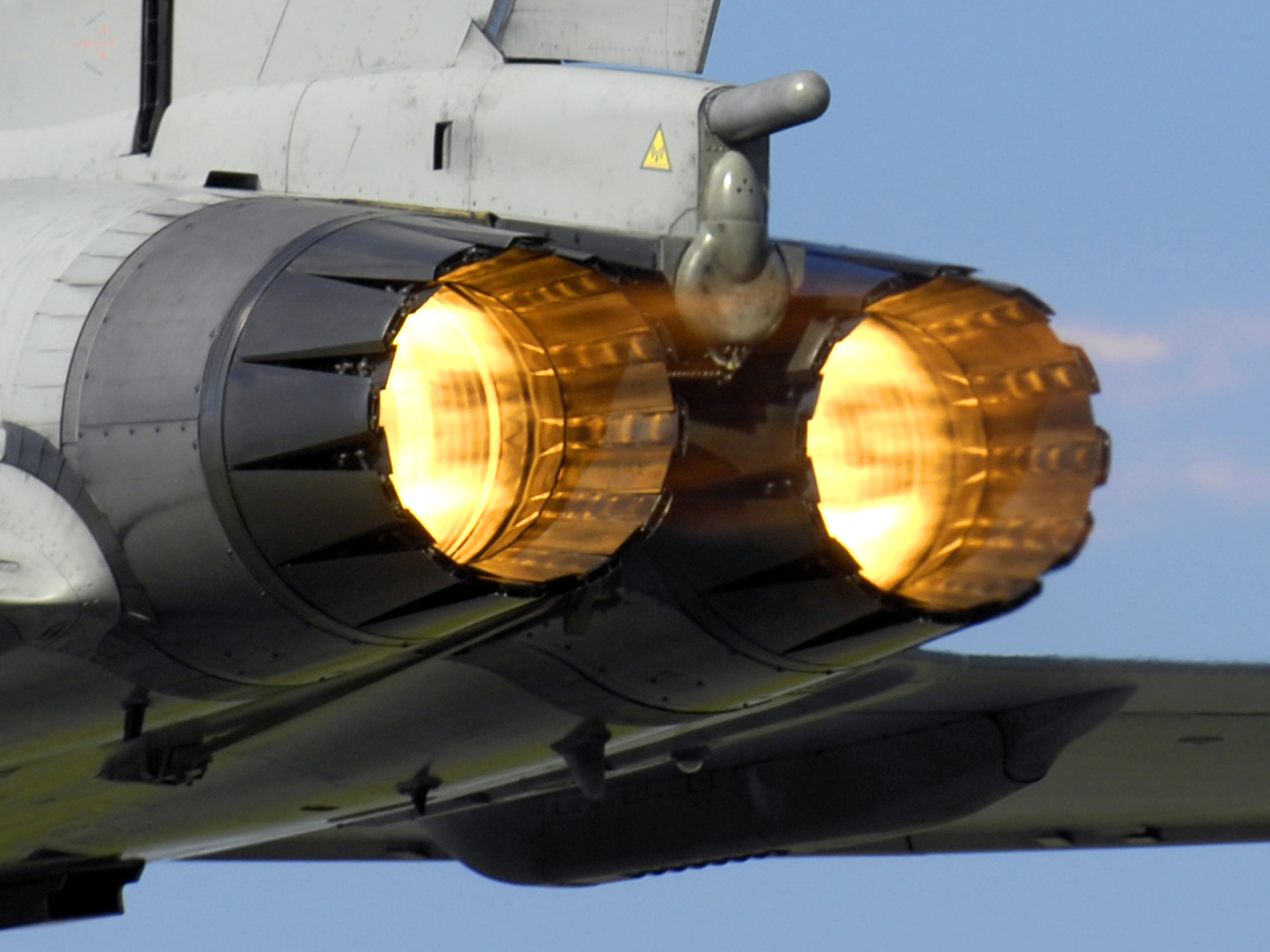
A Typhoon F2 fighter jet from 29 Squadron RAF ignites its afterburners whilst taking off from RAF Coningsby.

The partner companies have divided the world into regions with BAE selling Typhoons to the Middle East, Alenia Aermacchi pitching to Turkey, and EADS offering to Latin America, India and South Korea. Senior vice-president of Eurofighter sales Peter Maute has said that the Eurofighter could provide a complementary capability to stealth fighters.

=== Austria (4) ===
The Austrian Air Force is looking to purchase training aircraft, among which, 4 twin-seaters Eurofighter Typhoon for the conversion trainer.

=== Bangladesh ===
The Bangladesh Air Force is looking for a new jet fighter as part of the Forces Goal 2030 plan.

Plans and procedures for the procurement of 16 western-origin multirole fighter jet were established after the cancellation of the older tender for 8 to 12 Russian-made MRCA. According to several sources, the Eurofighter Typhoon and Dassault Rafale are in consideration. In 2021, Bangladesh Government earmarked around 25,200-crores taka (2.5 billion euro) for 16 western-origin multirole fighter jet.

In 2021, Eurofighter World Magazine stated Bangladesh as a potential customer for Eurofighter Typhoon. Germany already ordered 38 Tranche 4 as a launch customer with cost of 5.4 billion euro in late 2020.

On 9 December 2025, the Bangladesh Air Force signed a Letter of Intent with Leonardo S.p.A of Italy to procure Eurofighter Typhoon. According to the Air Force, the agreement covers the eventual supply of Eurofighter Typhoon jets, which are expected to join BAF's frontline fleet as part of its next-generation multi-role combat capabilities.

=== Egypt (24) ===
Italy and Egypt are negotiating the sale of 24 Eurofighter Typhoon for USD $3 billion.

=== Philippines (32) ===
The Philippines is looking to buy modern jet fighters as part of its multirole combat aircraft (MRCA) programme. Leonardo offered 32 Eurofighter Typhoon Tranche 5 to the Philippine Air Force.

The aircraft under evaluation are:

- Eurofighter Typhoon Tranche 5
- KAI KF-21 Boramae
- Lockheed Martin F-16C/D Block 70/72
- Saab JAS 39E/F Gripen

=== Saudi Arabia (48) ===
Saudi Arabia is looking for additional modern jet fighters. Saudi Arabia had been suffering from an arm embargo from Germany due to its war in Yemen and the assassination of the journalist, Jamal Khashoggi since 2019.

As of 2022, Germany lifted the ban on arms sales, but the Eurofighter remained blocked. As of 2024, Germany lifted the block on the sale of 48 Eurofighter Typhoon estimated at USD $13 billion.

=== Ukraine ===
Ukraine has expressed interest in the Eurofighter.

== Failed bids ==
=== Bahrain ===
The Eurofighter Typhoon was being considered along with the JAS 39 Gripen, Dassault Rafale, the F-16V and F-35 Lightning II for Bahrain's future fighter needs.

In 2017, Bahrain ordered 16 F-16 Viper Block 70.

=== Belgium ===
In July 2014, the Eurofighter Typhoon was noted to be one of the contenders to replace Belgium's fleet of ageing F-16A/B MLU's by 2023 as part of the "air combat capability successor program". The requirement stands for 40 aircraft. Other contenders include the SAAB Gripen-E/F, Dassault Rafale, F/A-18E/F Super Hornet and F-35A Lightning II. A decision was expected by 2016 and contracts signed by 2018.

On 25 October 2018, Belgium officially selected the offer for 34 F-35As to replace the current fleet of around 54 F-16s. In the accompanied news conference, government officials stated that the decision to select the F-35 over the Eurofighter Typhoon came down to the price, and later stated that "The offer from the Americans was the best in all seven evaluation criteria".

=== Bulgaria ===
Plans and procedures for the procurement of fighter jets was established in the middle of 2016. The estimated cost of the jets was expected to be around 1.5 billion lev and a contract for 8 aircraft was supposed to be reached by the end of 2016. Deliveries were planned for 2018 to 2021 and additional 8 aircraft for 2022 to 2023. In June 2017, Bulgaria had said that it would start negotiations for the Gripen. However, the procurement was again put on hold over concerns that not all bidders were treated equally. A new round of proposals was asked, which also included newly built Eurofighters from Italy and F-16s from US. In April 2020, Lockheed Martin officially awarded by the U.S. government to produce F-16 for Bulgaria and estimated to be completed in 2027.

=== Canada ===
In 2019, Airbus withdrew from the Canadian competition.

=== Colombia ===
Airbus has offered new Eurofighters and Spain used ones as part as a bid for new jet fighters. In 2022, as it was competing against the Rafale, the bid was cancelled. In September 2022, a new tender process was launched, and the Spanish Air Force offere 12-16 second-hand Eurofighter Typhoon Tranche 2.

As October 2024, the Gripen E/F seems to be the favoured choice by Colombia.

=== Denmark ===
Denmark has joined the Joint Strike Fighter program as a Level 3 partner in 2002. The Royal Danish Air Force is replacing its fleet of 48 aging F-16AM and F-16BMs.

Denmark's members of parliament were not expected to vote on a purchase of the F-35A before 2014, and were considering alternatives such as the JAS 39 Gripen NG and the F/A-18E/F Super Hornet, while the consortium behind the Eurofighter Typhoon withdrew in 2007.

On 13 March 2013, Denmark restarted their selection process for 30 new fighter aircraft. Candidates include the two-seated F/A-18F Super Hornet, and Eurofighter Typhoon, with the F-35A remaining as a candidate.

On 9 June 2016, the Danish defence committee agreed to purchase 27 F-35As to succeed the F-16 for US$3 billion.

=== Finland ===
In June 2015, a working group set up by the Finnish MoD proposed starting the so-called HX Fighter Program to replace the Air Force's current fleet of ageing F/A-18 Hornet, which would reach the end of their service life by the end of the 2020s. The group recognises five potential types: Boeing F/A-18E/F Advanced Super Hornet, Dassault Rafale, Eurofighter Typhoon, Lockheed Martin F-35A and Saab JAS-39E/F Gripen.

The request for information concerning the HX Fighter Program was sent in early 2016; the five responses were received in November 2016. A call for tender will be sent in spring 2018 and the buying decision is scheduled to take place in 2021. The Finnish newspaper Iltalehti reported that several foreign and security policy sources had confirmed the Finnish Defense Forces recommendation of the F-35 as Finland's next fighter. Apparently, the same sources pointed to the F-35's capability and expected long lifespan as key reasons for it winning through in favor of the rivals. Finland ordered the F-35 in February 2022.

=== Germany ===
As part of the replacement of the Panavia Tornado, Airbus offered the Eurofighter Typhoon for the nuclear capacity mission. It was initially in competition against the F-18 E/F and the F-35A Lightning II. Airbus retired from the programme as adapting the aircraft for carrying the B61-12 was too expensive, and the United States were reluctant to allow it.

The F-35A was eventually selected, and an order for 35 aircraft was made.

=== Greece ===
On March 8, 2000 Greece became the first export customer for the Eurofighter Typhoon, ordering 60 aircraft for €4.9 billion, with an option for 30 more.

However, in 2004, Greece postponed the deal to buy the Eurofighter Typhoon in order to finance the 2004 Summer Olympics, with Greece cancelling the deal in favor of purchasing 30 Lockheed Martin F-16C/D Fighting Falcons for $3.1 billion.

=== India ===
Eurofighter was one of the six aircraft competing for the Indian MRCA competition for 126 multi-role fighters. In April 2011, the Indian Air Force (IAF) shortlisted the Dassault Rafale and Eurofighter Typhoon for the US$10.4 billion contract. On 31 January 2012, the IAF announced the Rafale as the preferred bidder in the competition.

=== Indonesia ===
Eurofighter and other fighter manufacturers responded to a request for information issued by the Indonesian government in January 2015 for a fighter to replace the ageing F-5s currently in service with the Air Force. Eurofighter offered its latest version of the Typhoon, equipped with Captor-E AESA radar, for Indonesia's F-5 replacement programme.

In a letter to the Austrian Minister of Defence in July 2020, Indonesia expressed willingness to buy its entire fleet of 15 Typhoons that have been operating in the Austrian Air Force since 2008. The move was criticized due to the "secondhand" nature of the aircraft, its high operational cost, and past legal dispute between Austrian Defence Ministry and Airbus.

In February 2022, the Dassault Rafale was selected by the Indonesia Air Force.

=== Italy ===
in 2002, Italy believed that the F-35 unit cost would be about half that of the Eurofighter.

=== Japan ===
In March 2007, Jane's Information Group reported that the Typhoon was the favourite to win the contest for Japan's next-generation fighter requirement. The other competitors then were the F/A-18E/F Super Hornet and McDonnell Douglas F-15E Strike Eagle. On 17 October 2007, Japanese Defence Minister Shigeru Ishiba confirmed that Japan may buy the Typhoon. Although the F-22 Raptor was in his words "exceptional", it was not "absolutely necessary for Japan", and the Typhoon was the best alternative. The F-22 is currently unavailable for export per US law. During a visit to Japan in June 2009, Andy Latham of BAE pointed out that while F-22 exports were restricted to keep advanced military technology from falling into the wrong hands, selling the Typhoon would take a "no black box approach", that is that even licensed production and integration with Japanese equipment would not carry the risk of leakage of restricted military technology. In July 2010, it was reported that the Japan Air Self-Defense Force favoured acquiring the F-35 ahead of the Typhoon and the F/A-18E/F to fulfill its F-X requirement due to its stealth characteristics, but the Defense Ministry was delaying its budget request to evaluate when the F-35 would be produced and delivered. David Howell of the UK Foreign Office has suggested that Japan could partner with Britain in the continuing development of the Eurofighter. On 20 December 2011, the Japanese Government announced its intention to purchase 42 F-35s. The purchase decision was influenced by the F-35's stealth characteristics, with the Defence Minister Yasuo Ichikawa saying, "There are changes in the security environment and the actions of various nations and we want to have a fighter that has the capacity to cope".

=== Netherlands ===
To replace its F-16 fleet the RNLAF considered the Dassault Rafale, the Lockheed Martin F-16 Block 52/60, the Eurofighter Typhoon, the Saab Gripen, the F/A-18 Super Hornet and the Lockheed Martin F-35. In 2002 the Netherlands signed a Memorandum Of Understanding (MOU) to co-develop the F-35 as a 'Tier 2' Partner.

On 17 September 2013 the F-35A was officially selected as the replacement for the Royal Netherlands Air Force F-16 MLU and the Dutch government announced that it will purchase 37 JSF fighters for a purchase price of around 4.5 billion euro.

=== Norway ===
Norway considered purchasing the Eurofighter, but in 2012 signed the largest public procurement project in the country's history (worth $10bn) for the F-35A.

=== Peru ===
Peru expressed interest in acquiring used Eurofighters from Spain in 2013. Because of budget limitations, no purchase was made.

In the 2020s, a new tender process was launched for 24 jet fighters, and the Peruvian Air Force pre-selected the F-16V Block 70, the Gripen E/F and the Rafale F4.

=== Poland ===
Poland is planning to purchase 64 multirole combat aircraft from 2021 as part of the country's modernisation plans. The new fighters will replace the Polish Air Force's ageing fleet of Sukhoi Su-22M4 'Fitter-K' ground attack aircraft and Mikoyan MiG-29 'Fulcrum-A' fighter aircraft.

According to the announcement made by the Armament Inspectorate on 23 November 2017, Poland has initiated the procedure to acquire new fighter aircraft for the Polish Air Force. On 22 December 2017, five entities have expressed their intention to participate in the potential procurement of new fighter aircraft, referred to as “Harpia” (Harpy eagle). Companies that expressed their interest in the Multi-Role Combat Aircraft portion of the initiative include: Saab AB with Gripen NG, Lockheed Martin with F-35, Boeing Company with F/A-18, Leonardo S.p.A. with Eurofighter Typhoon and Fights-On Logistics with second hand F-16s.

On 31 January 2020, Poland signed a $4.6 billion deal for 32 F-35 fighters.

=== Singapore ===
In 2005 the Eurofighter was a contender for Singapore's next generation fighter requirement competing with the Boeing F-15SG and the Dassault Rafale. The Eurofighter was eliminated from the competition in June 2005 and the F-15SG was selected in September 2005.

In January 2020, the US government approved the procurement of four F-35B jets with the option to buy eight more of the same aircraft, as well as up to 13 engines, electronic warfare systems and related support and logistics services for US$2.75 billion by Singapore.

=== South Korea ===
In 2002, the Republic of Korea Air Force (ROKAF) chose the F-15K Slam Eagle over the Dassault Rafale, Eurofighter Typhoon and Sukhoi Su-35 for its 40 aircraft F-X Phase I fighter competition. During 2012–13, the Typhoon competed with the Boeing F-15SE Silent Eagle and the F-35 for the ROKAF's F-X Phase III fighter competition. In August 2013 it was announced that the F-15SE was the only remaining candidate, however the award was cancelled and in November 2013, it was announced that the ROKAF will purchase 40 F-35As.

=== Switzerland ===
==== Replacement of the F-5 Tiger II ====
In February 2007, it was reported that Switzerland was considering the Eurofighter, the Rafale and the Saab JAS 39 Gripen to replace its Northrop F-5 Tiger IIs. The Gripen was selected, but on 18 May 2014, 53.4% of Swiss voters voted against the plan in a national referendum.

==== Replacement of the F-18 C/D ====
On 30 June 2021 the Swiss Federal Council proposed the acquisition of 36 F-35As to Parliament at a cost of up to 6 billion Swiss francs (US$6.5 billion). The deal to buy 36 F-35As was signed on 19 September 2022, with deliveries to commence in 2027 and conclude by 2030.

=== United Arab Emirates ===
In November 2012, the UK government announced the formation of a formal defence and industrial partnership with the United Arab Emirates, paving the way for potential Typhoon sales with BAE Systems. On 19 December 2013 it was announced that UAE had decided not to proceed with the deal for the supply of defence and security services, including the supply of Typhoon aircraft. Analysts estimated that the break-off was due to the producing nations' lack of commitment for radar upgrades.

On 3 December 2021, the United Arab Emirates announced that it had reached an agreement to purchase 80 Rafales.

=== United Kingdom ===
A navalised Typhoon was among the options considered before selecting the F-35 as the Joint Combat Aircraft.
