= AN/ALQ-260 BriteCloud =

Digital Radio Frequency Memory jammer

BriteCloud
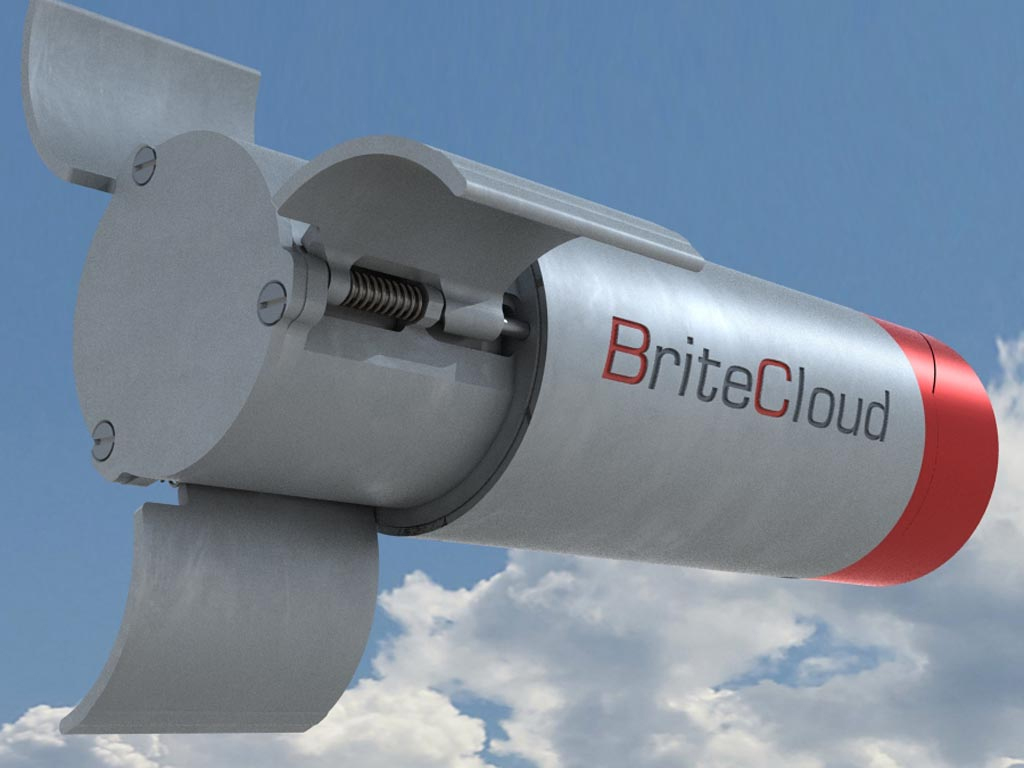
- BriteCloud 55 Decoy
- Inception: 2013
- Manufacturer: Selex ES; Leonardo-Finmeccanica (since 2016); Leonardo S.p.A. (since 2017)

BriteCloud is a self-contained expendable digital radio frequency memory (DRFM) jammer developed by Selex ES (merged into Leonardo since 2017) to help protect military aircraft. The decoy was launched by Selex ES at a conference held at the Churchill War Rooms, London on 6 November 2013.

== Background ==
Military aircraft face a highly developed airborne and surface-based RF threat. Mobile surface-to-air missiles with highly accurate RF tracking systems present a formidable threat when used in pop-up mode, and many older systems have been retrofitted with modern electronics that have greatly enhanced their capabilities. The modern systems are particularly difficult to counter, and have an array of Electronic Protection Measures (EPM) at their disposal.

== Description ==
BriteCloud was developed to counter modern tracking systems. Its technology is based on previous generations of electronic countermeasures such as repeaters and Towed Radar Decoys (TRD). When launched, the battery-powered decoy searches for and counters priority threats. Incoming radar pulses are received and the BriteCloud's onboard computer copies these pulses and uses them to simulate a ‘false target’ so that the threat system cannot detect the intended target and fails.

It is available in two versions: the BriteCloud 55 decoy launched from standard 55 mm diameter chaff/flare cartridge dispensers, and the BriteCloud 218 decoy launched from smaller 2”×1”×8” square-format standard cartridge dispensers. In 2019, the development of the BriteCloud 55-T was announced, designed for bigger military aircraft with larger radar cross-sections, e.g. the Lockheed C-130 Hercules.

== Development and testing ==
The first trials of the BriteCloud 55 decoy on the Eurofighter Typhoon took place in April 2019. Integration work on the aircraft is ongoing, as part of Project Centurion. Once in service with the RAF, BriteCloud will be one of the countermeasures available to the Typhoon's Praetorian DASS.

The BriteCloud 218 version was first tested on a Royal Danish Air Force F-16, successfully deploying the decoy after a real surface-to-air missile targeting system was used to lock on to the aircraft.

The BriteCloud 218 decoy has now been approved by the US Air National Guard for deployment on its F-16 fleet, after the US Defense Department's Foreign Comparative Testing trials that began in 2019. It uses standard-size rectangular (square-format) rounds, compatible with common dispensers for example the AN/ALE-47, and is thus usable on other 4th Generation fighters including the F-15, F/A-18 and A-10. Its US designation will be the AN/ALQ-260(V)1.

The decoy has been integrated on the General Atomics MQ-9 Reaper and MQ-9B Sky/SeaGuardian UCAVs after testing in late 2020. It's deployed by an AN/ALE-47 dispenser, part of the aircraft's Self-Protection Pod.

The BriteCloud 55-T version has now been upgraded to pass NATO's STANAG-4871 self-protection standard. This means it now features compatibility with 'smart dispenser' systems, allowing the decoy to share data with the host aircraft's onboard self-protection system. It also now enables the ability to interface with smart dispenser systems using the NATO-developed Smart Stores Communication Interface (SSCI). The SSCI means BriteCloud can be carried with a mixed load of expendables and allows automatic logging of payload data e.g. air carriage life. Leonardo is planning to apply this update to the BriteCloud 218 version.

== SPEAR-EW ==
Technologies from BriteCloud are being used to develop the payload for SPEAR-EW, the electronic warfare variant of the SPEAR product line under development for the Royal Air Force. SPEAR-EW will be capable of both stand-in / stand-off jamming / spoofing similar to the capabilities of the US Air Force's ADM-160 MALD.

== Partners ==
Selex ES announced at the 2013 launch event that defence and security company Saab will be the first partner to offer the new decoy as an optional electronic warfare enhancement for all versions of the JAS 39 Gripen, both new and existing.

== StormShroud ==
In May 2025, the RAF introduced the StormShroud into service. The system consists of a Tekever AR3 UAS equipped with the BriteCloud jammer to fly into contested airspace ahead of Typhoons and F-35B fighters to spoof radar signals and assist with suppression of enemy air defenses (SEAD). While traditional manned aircraft carrying stand-off jammers had to maintain distance for survivability, the unmanned AR3 acts as a stand-in jammer/decoy that can operate more effectively by flying a pre-planned route inside of enemy air defense areas. The rail-launched, propeller-powered AR3 has a maximum weight of 25 kg (55 lb), 16 hours of endurance with a 100 km (62 mi) range, and a cruise speed of up to 90 km/h (56 mph). StormShroud is classified as a tier two drone, meaning it can be recovered and reused, but is cheap enough that some can afford to be lost. It is designed to be cheaply produced and rapidly fielded, with an initial investment of £19 million ($25 million) to produce "hundreds" of platforms within the year.

== See also ==
- Digital radio frequency memory
- Active protection system
- Electronic countermeasures
- Electronic warfare
- Gripen
- List of military electronics of the United States
- Similar US military airborne countermeasures systems
