= MBDA UK =

British missile manufacturer

- Type: Division
- Industry: Defence
- Founded: 2001; 25 years ago
- Headquarters: Stevenage, England
- Number of locations: 3
- Key people: Chris Allam (Managing Director)
- Products: See Products
- Number of employees: 4,000
- Parent: MBDA
- Website: www.mbda-systems.com

MBDA UK is the British division of the pan-European missile systems company MBDA (itself a joint venture of Airbus, BAE Systems and Leonardo). Formed in 2001, the company has developed, both independently and in cooperation, a range of missile systems, including the CAMM missile family, Storm Shadow cruise missile, ASRAAM air-to-air missile and Meteor beyond-visual-range missile (BVRAAM).

== History ==
=== Formation and early years ===
MBDA UK was first incorporated in 1996 as Brathwell, based in Cardiff, before being renamed Matra BAe Dynamics UK shortly afterwards, serving as the UK-based part of the Anglo-French missile systems company, Matra BAe Dynamics. In 2001, Matra BAe Dynamics merged with the French EADS Aerospatiale Matra Missiles and Anglo-Italian Alenia Marconi Systems to form a pan-European missile systems company, named MBDA. After the merge, national subsidiaries were created from the predecessor companies in the United Kingdom, France and Italy and named MBDA UK, MBDA France and MBDA Italy, respectively. MBDA UK inherited various products which were designed and manufactured by its predecessor companies, including Rapier and Sea Wolf surface-to-air missiles, which were originally manufactured by the British Aircraft Corporation (BAC).

In 2001, the company delivered its Storm Shadow cruise missile to the Royal Air Force, which it had co-developed with the French subsidiary of Matra BAe Dynamics. Whilst the weapon was still in trials, it was pushed into operational service for use by the RAF during Operation Telic in Iraq. The following year also saw the delivery of the ASRAAM short-range air-to-air missile, which had been in testing since 1998. The missile was delivered 37 months behind schedule, due largely to hardware and software technical difficulties, however the UK Ministry of Defence also blamed the delays on MBDA for "failing to meet contractual performance".

MBDA UK became the prime contractor for the multinational Meteor programme in 2002 to deliver a beyond-visual-range air-to-air missile (BVRAAM) capability to its participants. The programme involved MBDA UK's sister divisions in France, Italy and Germany, as well as Spain and Sweden. Several years later, in 2005, the company delivered its Brimstone air-launched ground-attack missile to the RAF. Its first operational deployment came in 2008 during Operation Herrick in Afghanistan.

In 2009, the company made its first export sale for ASRAAM to Australia. This was followed shortly after by an export sale to Saudi Arabia.

=== 2010–present ===
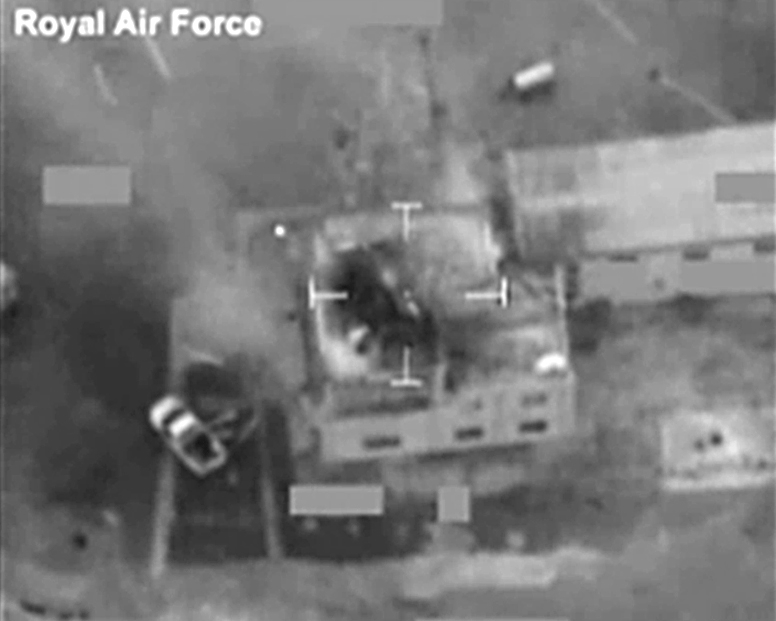
An RAF Brimstone missile strike during Operation Ellamy.

By 2010, the company had begun work on the Fire Shadow loitering munition for the British Army. The company's Brimstone missile also received increased publicity following the launch of Operation Ellamy in Libya and Operation Shader in Iraq and Syria, with politicians and analysts highlighting the missile's low risk of collateral damage. This resulted in increased interest in the missile on the export market, in particular by the United States and France. The company further developed Brimstone into a range of variants, including a sea-launched Brimstone Sea Spear, Brimstone 3 and an entirely new missile, currently named SPEAR 3, which uses technology derived from Brimstone.

The Lancaster House Treaties signed in 2010 by the British and French governments resulted in the company collaborating with MBDA France on several missile projects, including the Future Anti-Surface Guided Weapon (Heavy) (FASGW(H)) anti-ship missile, later named Sea Venom, and a new hypersonic cruise missile, later named Perseus.

In 2017, the company began leading a consortium to develop a laser directed-energy weapon technology demonstrator, named Dragonfire, for the UK MOD.

In 2018, MBDA UK opened a new facility in Bolton to carry out final assembly work for Meteor for all six European partner nations. By 2018, the missile had achieved marked export success, with export sales to India, Saudi Arabia, South Korea, Brazil and Egypt, among other countries. Since 2014, MBDA UK also collaborated with Japan to produce a Japanese Meteor-derived missile, known as JNAAM. During the same year, the company joined other leading British defence companies in Team Tempest, a consortium led by BAE Systems to develop the BAE Systems Tempest fighter aircraft. The company's responsibilities are to provide advanced weapon systems, including the integration of SPEAR 3 and Meteor missiles, electronic warfare capabilities and an anti-ship cruise missile which is still in development.

The company's sales to Saudi Arabia, particularly of Brimstone and Storm Shadow ground-attack missiles, received increased scrutiny following the Saudi Arabian-led intervention in Yemen and Saudi Arabia's alleged war crimes. The potential complicity of MBDA UK in these crimes became the subject of a 300-page report submitted to the International Criminal Court by the European Centre for Constitutional and Human Rights in 2019.

Following the Russian invasion of Ukraine in February 2022, MBDA UK supported the British government's efforts to supply Ukraine with military aid. The company's weapons donated to Ukraine include the Brimstone air-to-ground missile and the Storm Shadow cruise missile. The latter was described as a "game changer" by analysts as Ukraine had a deficiency in long-ranged weapons. The missiles had to be modified for integration on Ukraine's Soviet-sourced Su-24 strike aircraft. This process took a matter of weeks, rather than years under normal circumstances. The missiles have been used extensively during the war, including in attacks against the Russian Black Sea Fleet. Working with the UK MOD, MBDA UK also rapidly developed a surface-launched variant of its ASRAAM air-to-air missile to be used for air defence. It has a reported successful hit rate of 90%.

== Overview ==
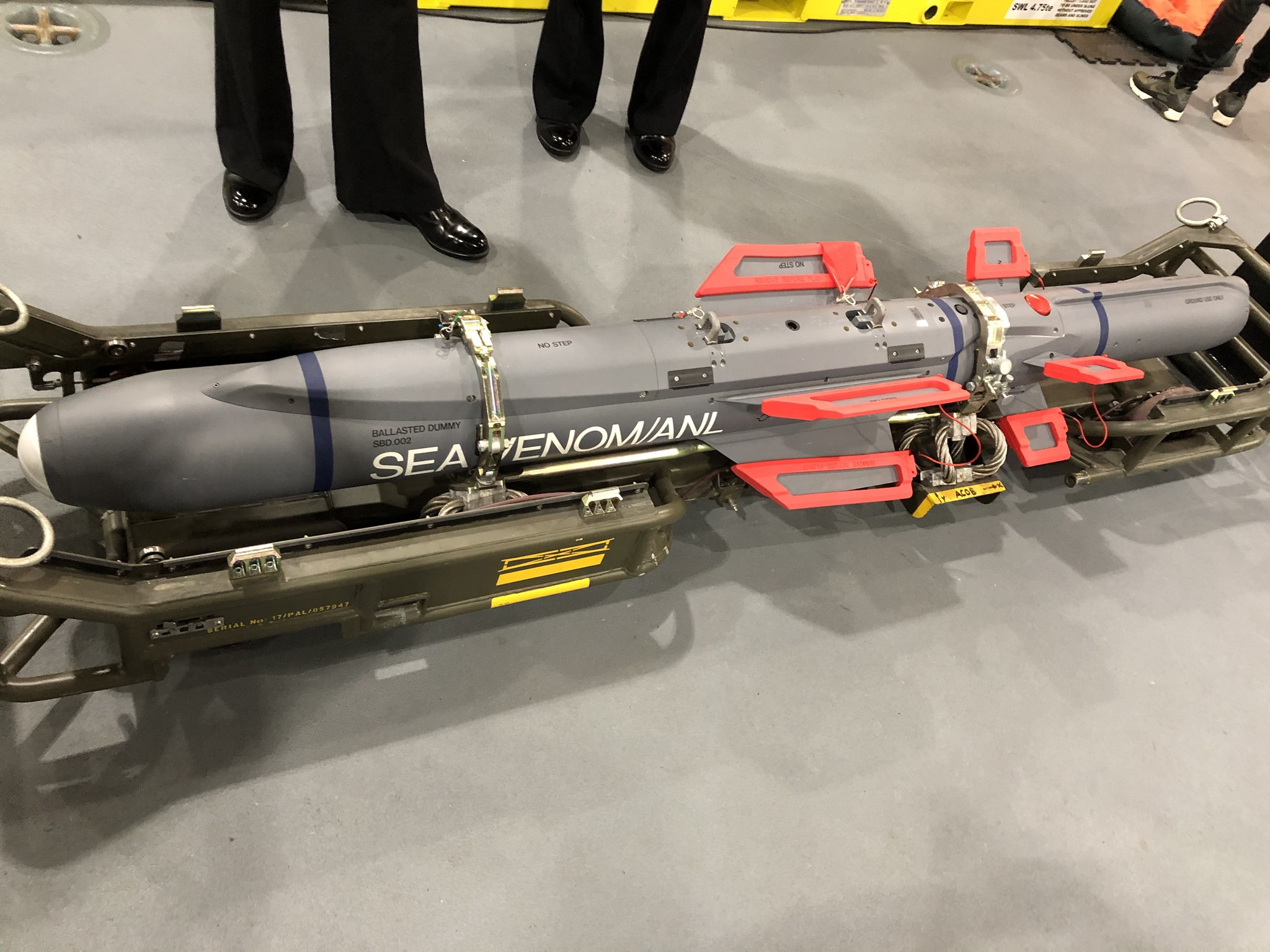
An inert Sea Venom anti-ship missile.

MBDA UK is headquartered in Stevenage, England. It has a workforce of 4,000 employees and has sites in Bristol, Bolton and Stevenage. It is the only part of MBDA with a Special Security Agreement (SSA) with the U.S. Department of Defense, allowing it to carry out classified activities in the United States. Chris Allam has been the company's Managing Director since 2018.

=== Products ===
==== Air-launched missiles ====
- Meteor beyond-visual-range missile (prime contractor in a joint venture with MBDA France, MBDA Germany and MBDA Italy)
- ASRAAM short-range air-to-air missile
- Brimstone ground-attack missile
- SPEAR 3 ground-attack missile
- Storm Shadow cruise missile (joint venture with MBDA France)
- ALARM anti-radiation missile

==== Surface-based missiles ====
- CAMM
  - Land Ceptor (CAMM-L) surface-to-air missile
  - CAMM-ER surface-to-air-missile (joint venture with MBDA Italy)
  - Sea Ceptor surface-to-air missile
- Rapier surface-to-air missile (originally developed by BAC)
- Brimstone Sea Spear surface-to-surface missile
- Sea Venom anti-ship missile (joint venture with MBDA France)
- Sea Wolf surface-to-air missile (originally developed by BAC)
- Sea Dart surface-to-air missile (originally developed by Hawker-Siddeley)
- Fire Shadow loitering munition

==== Under development ====
- Future Cruise/Anti-Ship Weapon multi-platform cruise missile (joint venture with MBDA France)
