= StormShroud =

Royal Air Force electronic warfare uncrewed aircraft

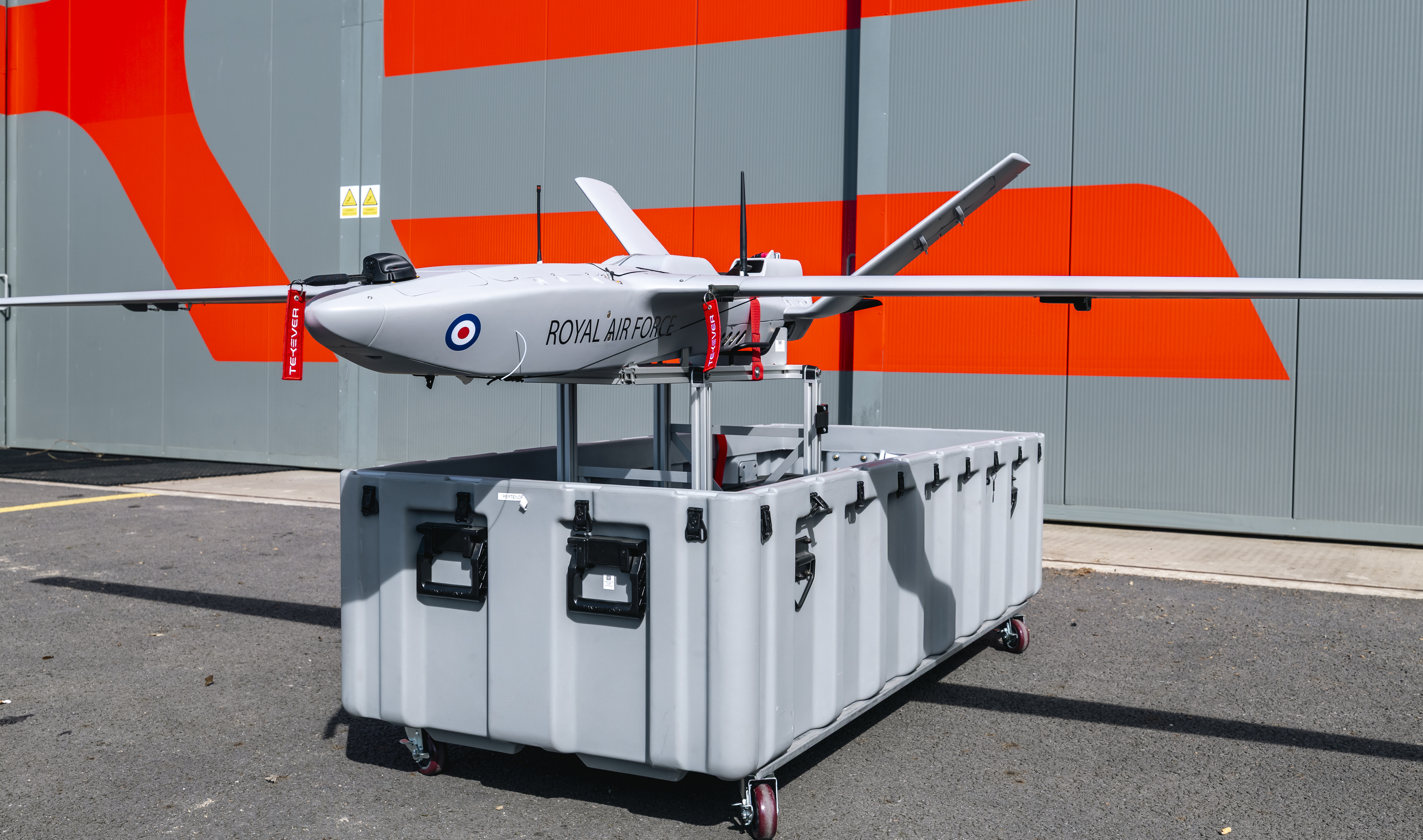
- StormShroud on display at its entry into service, May 2025

General information
- Type: Electronic warfare uncrewed aerial vehicle
- National origin: Portugal / United Kingdom
- Manufacturer: Tekever (airframe); Leonardo UK (payload)
- Status: In service
- Primary user: Royal Air Force
- Number built: Undisclosed

History
- Introduction date: 2 May 2025
- Developed from: Tekever AR3

StormShroud is an uncrewed electronic warfare aircraft operated by the Royal Air Force (RAF). It is based on the Tekever AR3 tactical uncrewed air system and carries the BriteCloud stand-in jammer developed by Leonardo UK. Announced on 2 May 2025 as the first of a planned family of Autonomous Collaborative Platforms (ACPs), it is intended to fly ahead of crewed Typhoon and F-35B Lightning aircraft to disrupt hostile radars and integrated air defense systems.

StormShroud is operated by No. 216 Squadron RAF from RAF Waddington, with launch, recovery and force protection provided by the RAF Regiment.

== Development ==
=== Background ===
In July 2019 the RAF announced that No. 216 Squadron would reform as an experimental unit to test swarming drone technology, and the squadron formally stood up at RAF Waddington on 1 April 2020. In March 2024 the Minister of State for Defence Procurement, James Cartlidge, told Parliament that the squadron had not completed any drone tests or trials since being reconstituted. In October 2024 the government stated that 216 Squadron would instead become the operational delivery squadron for an Autonomous Collaborative Platforms capability in 2025, with the trials role passing to 744 Naval Air Squadron.

=== Programme ===
StormShroud was developed in the United Kingdom by the RAF Rapid Capabilities Office, the Catalyst team within Defence Equipment and Support (DE&S), the Defence Science and Technology Laboratory (Dstl) and industry. The RAF described it as one of its first "high-risk capabilities", brought into service under a risk-aware approach to assurance intended to avoid the time and cost penalties of conventional procurement. According to the RAF, the programme took around a year from the endorsement of an Urgent Capability Requirement to delivery of the capability. The service stated that the design drew on lessons from the Russian invasion of Ukraine, where the AR3 airframe had already been used extensively.

Tekever supplies the airframe and carries out systems integration, while Leonardo provides the electronic warfare payload. The AR3 airframes are built at Tekever's facilities in west Wales and Southampton, and the BriteStorm payload at Leonardo's site in Luton.

A StormShroud lost control and crashed during a training flight at West Wales Airport, Aberporth, on 19 March 2025, before the type's public announcement.

The initial batch of 24 drones had a total cost of £19 million, about £792,000 per StormShroud.

== Design ==
=== Airframe ===
The Tekever AR3 is a small fixed-wing uncrewed aerial vehicle with a pusher propeller, designed for tactical ISTAR missions. It has a wingspan of 3.5 m, a maximum take-off weight of around 25 kg including a 4 kg payload, and an endurance of up to 16 hours in its standard fixed-wing configuration. It can be converted to vertical take-off and landing by fitting rotor motors to the wings. The RAF gives StormShroud a cruise speed of 46 knots and a maximum altitude of 12,000 ft; it is launched by catapult and recovered by parachute and airbag. Tekever states that the AR3 has flown more than 10,000 hours in Ukraine, where it operates 200–300 km behind the front line in support of long-range targeting, and that operational use there has driven more than 100 iterative upgrades.

=== Payload ===
StormShroud carries BriteStorm, a stand-in jammer developed by Leonardo UK at Luton. The payload is designed to fly ahead of high-value crewed aircraft and degrade the radar tracking and targeting of integrated air defence systems through high-powered digital jamming and deception techniques, including the generation of false aircraft signatures. Leonardo describes the system as consisting of a Miniature Techniques Generator and tailored transmit-receive modules. BriteStorm shares digital radio frequency memory technology with Leonardo's BriteCloud expendable decoy.

=== Role ===
The aircraft is intended for the suppression of enemy air defences (SEAD) role, operating ahead of Typhoon and F-35B Lightning strike packages to blind or deceive hostile radars. The RAF regards the system as attritable: it is designed to be recovered, reused and rapidly reprogrammed, but its loss in defence of crewed aircraft is considered acceptable.

== Operational history ==
=== Entry into service ===
The RAF announced StormShroud's entry into operational service on 2 May 2025, during a visit by the Prime Minister, Keir Starmer, to Leonardo's Luton site. The number of aircraft procured was not disclosed. The service stated that the system had reached a minimum deployable capability at that point.

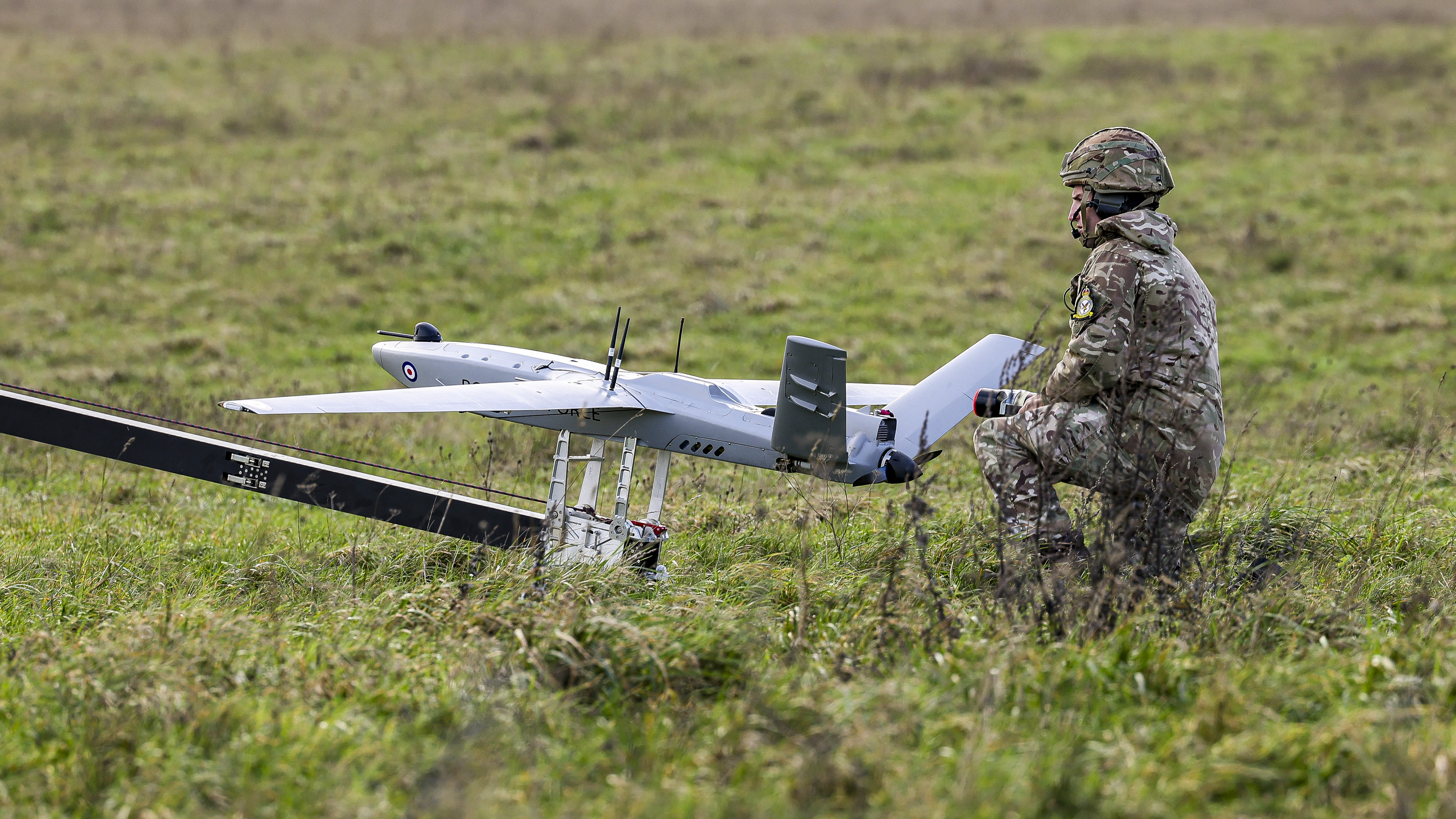
StormShroud, the Royal Air Force's, deployed in the field with RAF personnel. The platform carries Leonardo UK's BriteStorm stand-in jammer and is operated with support from the RAF Regiment. released by the RAF, 2025.

StormShroud is operated by 216 Squadron, supported by the RAF Regiment and drawing on regular RAF, Royal Auxiliary Air Force and other defence personnel. Squadron members are trained to operate in small teams in high-threat environments; reservists, some of them specialists from the uncrewed systems industry, handle launch and recovery and liaison with the Typhoon and Lightning force.

=== Testing and exercises ===
216 Squadron flew the type's first in-service sortie on the air weapons ranges at RAF Spadeadam in June 2025, supported by No. 1 Squadron RAF Regiment. Further flying periods followed during 2025 at Spadeadam, RNAS Predannack and the Salisbury Plain Training Area, with the complexity of trials increasing from single aircraft to multiple platforms operating simultaneously. A joint deployment to Spadeadam in September 2025 was used to refine tactics, techniques and procedures with the RAF Regiment, and an exercise on Salisbury Plain in December 2025 demonstrated the coordinated operation of several StormShroud aircraft.

Flying continued in Cornwall in February 2026, and the RAF stated that domestic and international exercises were planned for the remainder of the year alongside work on greater autonomy for the platform.

== Operators ==
United Kingdom

- Royal Air Force
  - No. 216 Squadron RAF – RAF Waddington

== Specifications ==
Data from RAF, Calibre Defence, Defense News

General characteristics

- Crew: None (uncrewed)
- Wingspan: 3.5 m (11 ft 6 in)
- Max takeoff weight: 25 kg (55 lb)Launch: catapult; recovery: parachute and airbag

Performance

- Cruise speed: 85 km/h (53 mph, 46 kn)
- Range: 100 km (62 mi, 54 nmi)
- Endurance: 16 hours (fixed-wing configuration)
- Service ceiling: 3,700 m (12,000 ft)

Avionics
Leonardo UK BriteStorm stand-in jammer

== See also ==
- Tekever
- Loyal wingman
- Suppression of enemy air defences
- List of active United Kingdom military aircraft
