= F-X Project =

F-X or F-X Project may refer to:

- A program begun in 1965 by the United States Air Force that led to the McDonnell Douglas F-15 Eagle
- Project F-X2, known as F-X from the mid-1990s and before 2007, a purchase of fighter aircraft by the Brazilian Air Force
- A phased procurement program begun in 2002 for fighter aircraft for the Republic of Korea Air Force
- Mitsubishi F-X, a stealth fighter in development beginning in December 2009 for the Japan Air Self-Defense Force

== See also ==
- KF-X, a program of the Republic of Korea Air Force
- TAI TF-X, a fighter in development by Turkish Aerospace Industries
