= SPEAR 3 =

UK cruise missile and electronic warfare system

SPEAR (effector family)
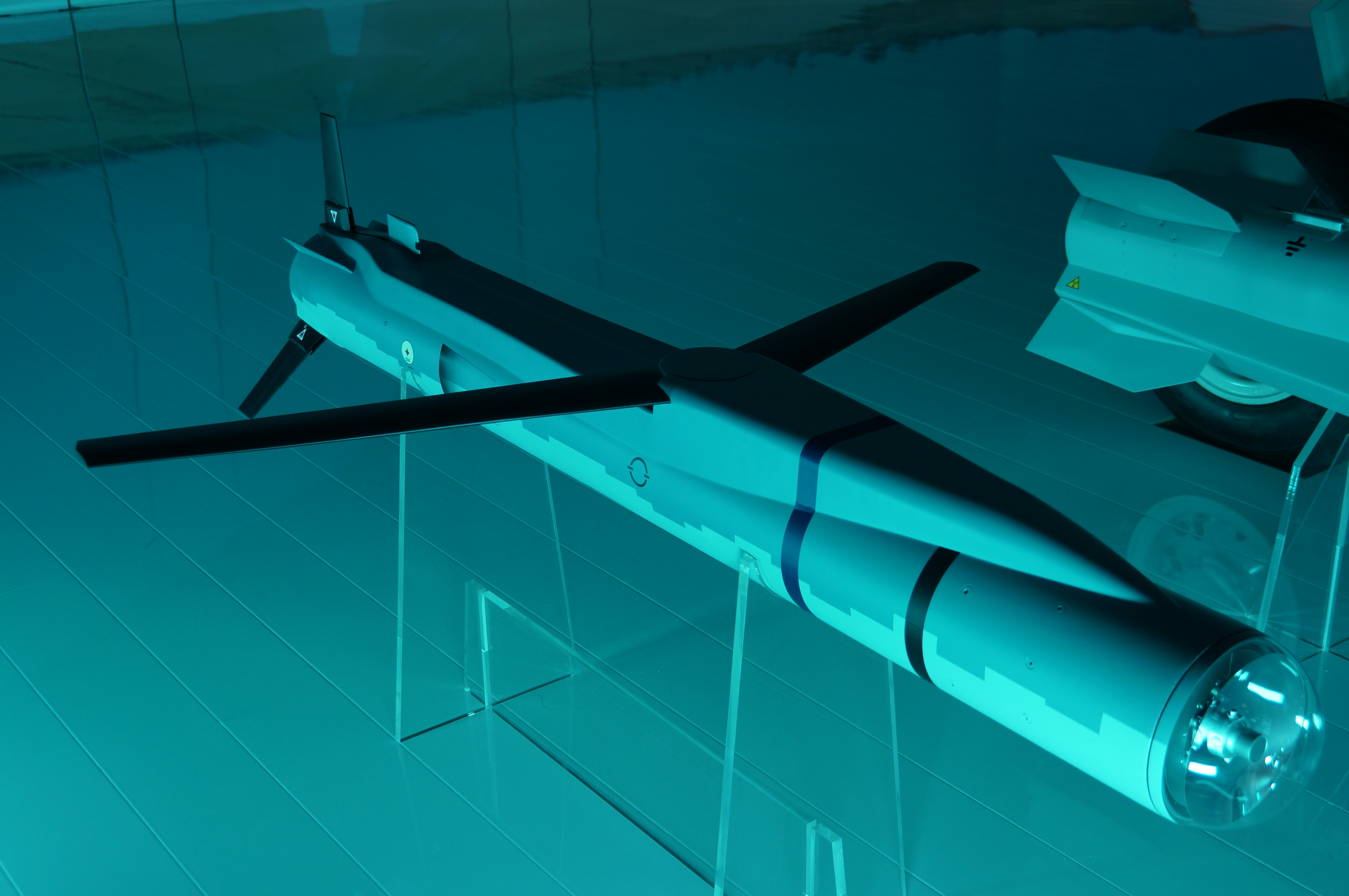
- Type: Spear: Air-launched cruise missile Spear-EW: Electronic warfare decoy/jamming system
- Place of origin: United Kingdom

Service history
- Used by: See Users

Production history
- Designer: MBDA UK
- Manufacturer: MBDA UK

Specifications
- Mass: < 90 kg (200 lb)
- Length: 1.8 m (5.9 ft)
- Diameter: 180 mm (7.1 in)
- Engine: Pratt & Whitney TJ-150 turbojet
- Operational range: > 140 km (87 mi)
- Maximum speed: High subsonic
- Guidance system: Millimeter wave active radar homing, Semi-active laser guidance, GPS coupled Inertial guidance, Two-way Data-link
- Steering system: Flight control surfaces
- Launch platform: Typhoon (for trials); F-35B (in progress)

SPEAR is a family of air-launched weapons under development by MBDA UK for the Royal Air Force's Select Precision Effects At Range (SPEAR) Capability 3, or SPEAR 3 programme, from which the system also derives its name. The SPEAR family currently consists of two variants: SPEAR, a 100 kg class air-to-surface cruise missile; and SPEAR-EW, an electronic warfare variant for stand-in jamming or for use as a decoy.

SPEAR is currently planned to be integrated on the F-35B Lightning as part of the Block 4 upgrade. It has been integrated onto the Eurofighter Typhoon for testing purposes, but it is unclear if formal integration will occur. Models of SPEAR have also been shown next to those of Tempest as a possible future weapon for the platform.

The weapon was due to be operational in 2025; however, in November 2021, the UK Government announced that the F-35 might not be fully capable of operating SPEAR-3 until 2028. In May 2025, this was further postponed, with the government announcing that the in service date was expected to be in the early 2030s.

== Background ==
One of the Select Precision Effects At Range (SPEAR) programme's first mentions was in the 2005 Defence Industrial Strategy (DIS). This vaguely described it as a new munition "planned to address the capability requirement to be able to attack fast-moving targets at range" that was then in its concept phase. The 2005 DIS also highlighted the increased importance of precision-guided weaponry but also the importance of maintaining the UK's sovereign industrial base for the development for such systems. It discussed how the performance and safety aspects of weapon systems can only be guaranteed if the UK has access to and a complex understanding of a weapon system, something that may not always be possible with systems imported from other nations such as the United States. This among other advantages of a sovereign complex weapons industry made maintaining this capability of high importance. As such, the DIS outlined planned efforts of rationalisation, government cooperation with industry, and consolidation to strengthen the UK's complex weapons capability. By 2006, this had culminated in Team Complex Weapons, a relationship primarily between MBDA and the Ministry of Defence (MoD), and supported by partners such as Thales, Roxel, and QinetiQ.

By 2006, the SPEAR programme had begun to evolve from a singular munition to instead a portfolio of air-to-surface guided weapons programmes fulfilling five distinct capabilities through either the upgrading of existing precision-guided munitions, or the development new systems:

- Capability 1: Upgrades to Raytheon's Paveway IV 225 kg guided-bomb (reduction of collateral damage, new penetrator warhead, and improved performance against moving targets)
- Capability 2: Upgrades to MBDA's Brimstone 50 kg (110 lb) class missile (development of dual-mode capability).
- Capability 3: A new 100 kg (220 lb) class munition with in-flight re-targeting capability.
- Capability 4: Upgrades to MBDA's Storm Shadow long-range stand-off weapon.
- Capability 5: A new successor missile to replace Storm Shadow (now known as Stratus)

The requirements for SPEAR 3 were identified initially from the RAFs experience during the 1999 NATO intervention in Kosovo with shortfalls in engaging time-sensitive targets that were mobile and manoeuvrable. By 2015, this had evolved to become a low-collateral weapon with high accuracy at all times and in all weather conditions whilst in theatres with restrictive rules of engagement and that had sufficient range to 'stand-off' outside the effective envelope of the latest integrated air defence systems.

Initially, the SPEAR 3 programme was kept outside of the Team Complex Weapons structure which allowed for companies outside the team to submit offering for SPEAR 3. In 2006, Lockheed Martin offered the Surveilling Miniature Attack Cruise Missile (SMACM) but was not taken forward. In the 2010s, Raytheon offered the Small Diameter Bomb-II (SDB-II) unpowered glide bomb including the possibility of licensed production at its UK facilities. Meanwhile, MBDA UK offered a new missile design utilising its existing weapon technologies to produce miniature cruise missiles. In 2010, MBDA was awarded a £150 million four-year assessment phase to further examine the development of this new weapon system, specifically developing and testing the guidance system including the seeker head and data link, as well as the warhead. This would eventually culminate with a test-launch from an aircraft. In 2012, it was announced that Pratt & Whitney AeroPower had been contracted to provide propulsion technical assistance for MBDA's SPEAR 3 proposal, as well as the supply of a derivation of its TJ-150 turbojet for the weapon. In 2015, Raytheon considered developing a powered SDB-II variant with a turbojet, or alternatively, developing a weaponised variant of the ADM-160 MALD (Miniature Air-Launched Decoy) with both options as likely counters to MBDA's competing powered-weapon design by offering a lower-capability weapon system, but that was more mature, had a lower-cost and that could be produced sooner given the active production line of the standard SDB-II in the US. Reportedly, the MoD remained open to this trade-off and continued to give consideration to Raytheon's proposals.

In March 2016, a SPEAR test missile was successfully launched from a Eurofighter Typhoon trials aircraft operated by BAE Systems at the QinetiQ Aberporth range in Wales. This test-firing was specifically to test the missile’s airframe, navigation and propulsion systems. The missile transitioned through separation from the aircraft to powered flight before completing a series of manoeuvres, ending in a terminal dive to the desired point of impact. The missile accurately followed the planned trajectory and was well within simulation predictions; all trial objectives were achieved. On 18 March 2016, MBDA's bid for SPEAR 3 program was solidified when the MoD awarded them a £411 million contract for the development of air-launched SPEAR missile for the F-35B.

On 18 March 2019, BAE Systems announced that it, alongside Lockheed Martin and MBDA, had been contracted to integrate SPEAR onto the F-35B.

In September 2019, MBDA was awarded a technical demonstrator program contract by the Defence Equipment and Support agency for an electronic warfare variant of SPEAR for the RAF, incorporating Digital Radio Frequency Memory (DRFM) technology from Leonardo.

In June 2022, it was revealed that the first live-firing of SPEAR had been delayed until 2023 due to 'technical considerations and programme complexity'.

In July 2023, Government Major Projects Portfolio (GMPP) data revealed that the Delivery Confidence Assessment had been downgraded from Amber to Red primarily resulting from “challenges with resourcing sufficient suitably qualified and experienced people across the programme and delivery teams, and within industry”.

In September 2023, MBDA was awarded additional funds to fast-track the development of SPEAR-EW from the Ministry of Defence.

On 6 September 2024, Maria Eagle the Minister of State for Defence outlined that SPEAR was now in the demonstration phase. This also came with the announcement that the financial investment in the programme stood at approximately £1.4 billion. In mid-October 2024, the first live-firing of a SPEAR missile took place at the Vidsel test range in Sweden. The trial saw a BAE Systems-operated Typhoon test and evaluation aircraft equipped with a modified SPEAR, exchanging a live-warhead with a telemetry unit. The trial successfully demonstrated weapon release at high-speed and high-altitude, as well as long-range free-flight control to a target.

On 19 May 2025, it was announced that SPEAR was "undergoing re-baselining" and that delivery timeline for the weapon was now estimated for the early 2030s.

On 11 July 2025, the National Audit Office (NAO) published a report on the UK's F-35 capability which states that delays to SPEAR had been caused by: poor supplier performance partly due to lack of suitably qualified and experienced personnel; lack of delivery prioritisation within the commercial arrangements between MBDA and the MoD; and the programme awaiting a component delivery from the United States. These delays have left the UK's F-35 fleet limited to using the Paveway IV bomb as its sole air-to-surface weapon, but this lacks the range to engage all ground-based targets at a safe distance. As a result, acquisition of Small Diameter Bombs is being explored to provide an interim standoff capability.

On 9 September 2025, despite being a known variant for some time, MBDA officially revealed SPEAR Glide at DSEI 2025, a low-cost unpowered glide-bomb variant primarily targeted at fourth-generation combat aircraft.

== Characteristics ==
=== SPEAR ===
SPEAR weighs less than 90 kilograms (200 lb) with a length of 1.8 metres (5.9 ft) and a diameter of 180 millimetres (7.1 in). SPEAR is guided by inertial navigation and GPS as well as a two-way datalink. This with a multimode seeker head for terminal guidance which includes millimetric wave radar, semi-active laser and combined modes. The weapon is propelled by a Hamilton Sundstrand TJ-150 turbojet (the same engine as used in the JSOW-ER and MALD) which when combined with a folding wing kit and three deployable tail-fins, provides an engagement range reportedly in excess of 140 kilometres (87 mi). The size of SPEAR's warhead is not public, but is believed to be smaller than the SDB-II's approximately 105 pounds (48 kg) warhead. According to MBDA, SPEAR is designed to engage various ground targets including armoured vehicles, self-propelled artillery, air defences, ballistic missile launchers and defended structures, but also naval targets. MBDA produced an animation in 2015 showing SPEAR engaging small vessels including LCACs.

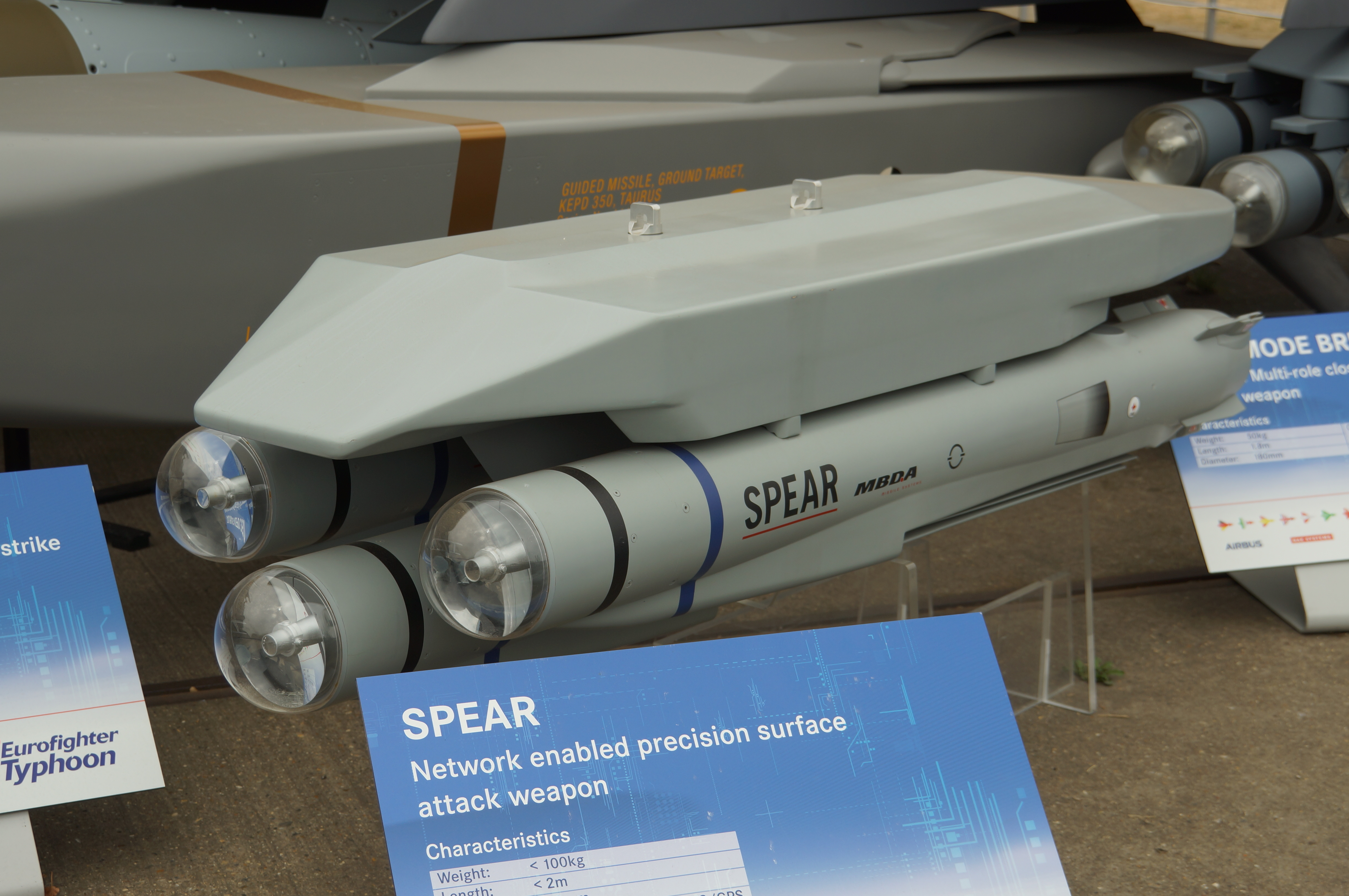
A triplet of SPEAR 3 missiles for the Eurofighter Typhoon. The missiles are carried inverted before dropping, flipping, deploying wings and tail, and accelerating towards their target.

SPEAR will be integrated with the F-35 Lightning's Block 4 software package. Whilst SPEAR has been integrated onto the Eurofighter Typhoon for testing purposes, it is still unclear if formal integration will occur. Mock-ups for the UK's future sixth-generation fighter 'Tempest' being developed under the Global Combat Air Program (GCAP) with Japan and Italy have been shown with SPEAR as part of the aircraft's possible future arsenal alongside the Stratus. Four SPEARs and an air-to-air missile (Meteor) will fit in each of the two internal weapons-bays of the F-35B when in an air-to-surface configuration. No images have yet been revealed of external carriage capability for the F-35B with all current renderings and models showing only internally mounted weapons. MBDA had previously shown artwork of a four-missile launch rail on a single Typhoon weapon station. This has been revised to instead a tri-rail configuration.

Networked swarm capability for SPEAR missiles is in development. In 2023, MBDA announced that SPEAR would be integrated into Orchestrike, MBDA's collaborative effector system utilising AI to allow multiple smart munitions to work in concert with one another. At the Farnborough Airshow 2024, MBDA confirmed that the SPEAR product line would be the first to receive this capability.

=== SPEAR-EW ===
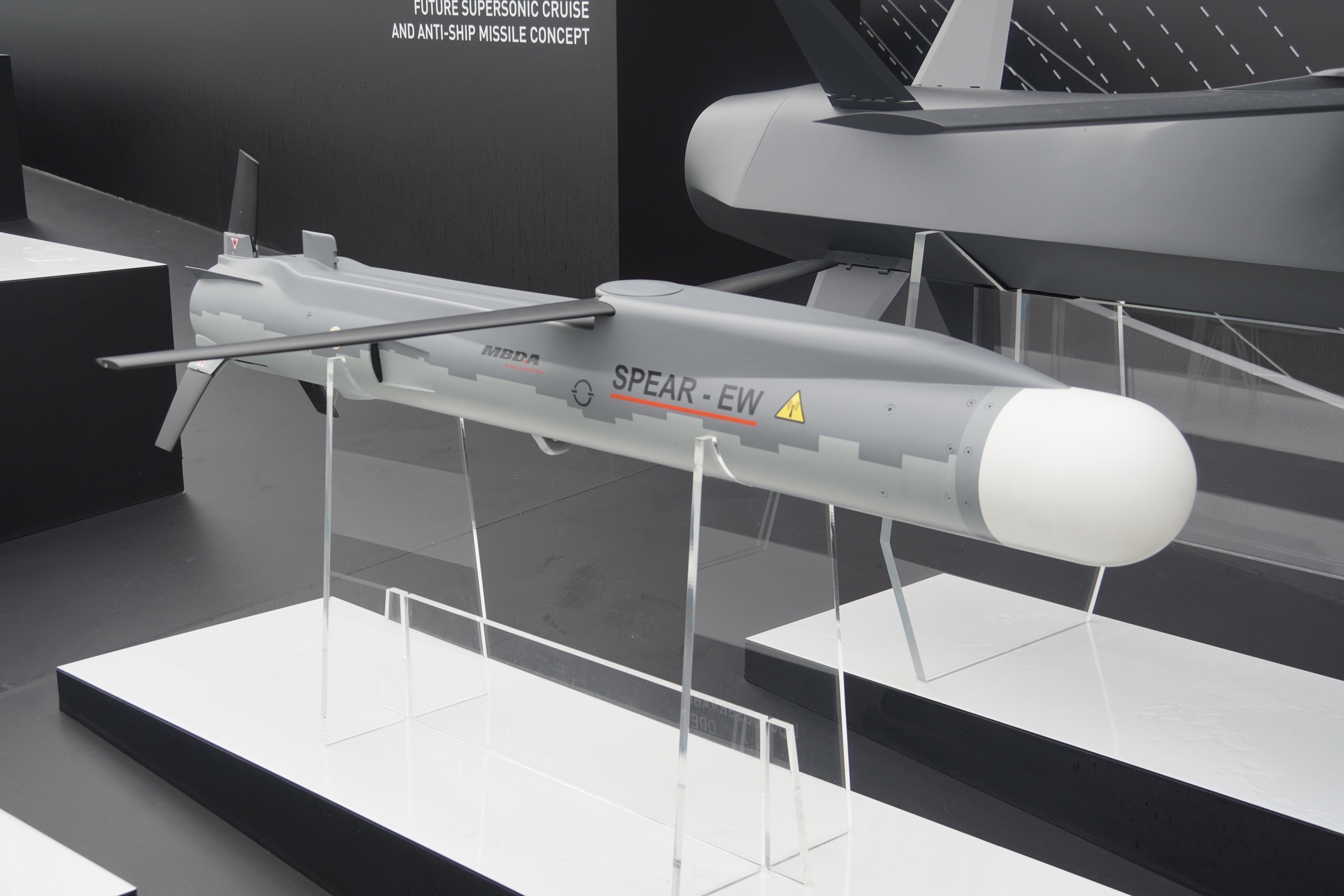
SPEAR-EW Electronic Warfare missile

SPEAR-EW maintains the same dimensions as SPEAR, but with an enlarged fuel capacity and the removal of the warhead and seeker to accommodate an electronic warfare payload derived from Leonardo UK's BriteCloud countermeasure. SPEAR-EW is designed to loiter in contested airspace and act as either a stand-in jammer or a decoy similar to the ADM-160 MALD. The UK had reportedly shown interest in the capabilities of MALD at the 2009 at the Paris Air Show.

=== SPEAR Glide ===
SPEAR Glide is an unpowered glide-bomb variant. SPEAR Glide weighs approximately 100 kilograms (220 lb) with a length of 2 metres (6.6 ft), it maintains some commonality with the rest of the SPEAR including the actuation system and the wing kit outer mould line but also incorporates common-of-the-shelf-components to lower costs and speed procurement. Alongside the lack of the TJ-150 turbojet, it also replaces SPEAR's radar seeker with a semi-active laser and electro-optic/infrared (EO/IR) seeker optimised image-based navigation and features a full calibre kinetic penetrator. SPEAR Glide is positioned as a low-cost, ITAR-free variant, optimised for faster production rates.

=== Common Anti-Surface Modular Missile ===
Common Anti-Surface Modular Missile (CAsMM) is a concept for a surface-launched variant that could be quad-packed into the Mark 41 / Mark 57 or similar vertical launcher systems (Sylver) by utilising the same Extensible Launching System (EXLS) munitions adapter as the Common Anti-Air Modular Missile (CAMM) family.

== Operators ==
=== Future operators ===
Italy

- Italian Navy - On 15 July 2024, documentation published by the Italian Parliament outlined that the Italian Navy's 20 F-35Bs would be equipped with SPEAR 3.

Saudi Arabia

- Royal Saudi Air Force - on 8 March 2022, a Memorandum of understanding was signed between Saudi Arabian Military Industries (SAMI) and MBDA, allowing for localised maintenance of MBDA munitions in addition to the planned production of CAMM and CAMM-ER air defence missiles as well as SPEAR 3. Likely to equip Saudi Eurofighter Typhoons.

South Korea

- Republic of Korea Air Force - On 20 November 2023, MBDA and Korea Aerospace Industries (KAI) formalised an agreement to improve collaboration of weapons integration on to the KAI KF-21 Boramae and KAI FA-50 Fighting Eagle. As part of this agreement, both parties are also exploring the integration of additional weapons, including SPEAR 3, onto both platforms as well as joint export. On 20 October 2025, MBDA and KAI signed a memorandum of understanding to integrate SPEAR into KF-21 Boramae multirole combat aircraft.

United Kingdom

- Royal Air Force / Royal Navy - Scheduled to be fully operational sometime in the early 2030s.

=== Potential operators ===
Germany

- German Air Force - Germany has reportedly shown interest in SPEAR to equip their Eurofighter Typhoons.

Italy

- Italian Air Force - Italy has reportedly shown interest in SPEAR to equip their Eurofighter Typhoons.

== Similar weapons ==
SPEAR

- GBU-53/B StormBreaker – (United States)

SPEAR-EW

- ADM-160 MALD – (United States)

== See also ==
- Future of the Royal Air Force
- Future of the Royal Navy
