= Boeing F-15SE Silent Eagle =

American stealth fighter proposal in 2009

Boeing/McDonnell Douglas F-15SE Silent Eagle

General information
- Type: Reduced-signature multirole strike fighter
- National origin: United States
- Manufacturer: Boeing Defense, Space & Security
- Proposals: Republic of Korea F-X Phase III (FX-III)
- Number built: 1 demonstrator aircraft (F-15E1)

History
- First flight: 8 July 2010 (demonstrator F-15E1)
- Initiated: 17 March 2009 (public unveiling)
- Developed from: McDonnell Douglas F-15E Strike Eagle
- Fate: Not selected for procurement; remained a proposal/demonstrator

The Boeing F-15SE Silent Eagle was a modified F-15 Eagle with stealth characteristics, It was a concept developed by Boeing as an export-oriented, stealthier variant of the F-15E Strike Eagle. The F-15SE was designed with conformal weapons bays and other features aimed at reducing its radar cross section (RCS). Although marketed for export sales, the design was not selected for development and adoption by any military forces.

The F-15SE planned to incorporate several features to minimize its radar cross-section (RCS), making it harder to detect by enemy radar. The traditional vertical stabilizers were canted outward at a 15-degree angle to reduce radar reflections. Extensive use of radar-absorbent material (RAM) on the airframe helped absorb radar waves, further reducing the RCS. The F-15SE was designed to carry weapons internally, eliminating the need for external hardpoints that would increase the RCS.

== Development ==
The F-15SE was officially unveiled by Boeing on March 17, 2009, as a stealth-enhanced variant of the F-15E. It was designed primarily for foreign military sales, targeting countries that were restricted from acquiring the F-22 or seeking more affordable alternatives to the F-35.

The F-15SE was pitched to South Korea during its F-X fighter program. South Korea ultimately selected the F-35A in 2013, marking a major setback for the F-15SE. Other potential customers, such as Saudi Arabia, Japan, and Israel favored the F-15SA, F-15IA, or the F-35A.

By the mid-2010s, Boeing had shifted its focus to developing the F-15SA (Saudi Advanced), a less ambitious modernized evolution of the F-15 platform optimized for payload, range, and Open Mission Systems (OMS). Improvements include a new fly-by-wire system and, in later variants, the advanced cockpit originally intended for the F-15SE. The F-15SA became the basis for the Advanced Eagle family, eventually evolving into the F-15QA (Qatari Advanced) and the F-15EX. The F-15EX was intended to replace the F-15C/D primarily for the U.S. Air National Guard, would become the standard Advanced Eagle configuration for production and export.

== Design ==
The F-15SE was not entirely planned to feature an avionics suite based on the F-15E. It was planned to feature the APG-82 AESA radar, offering improved detection range, resolution, and electronic counter-countermeasures compared to earlier models. The F-15SE was planned to be equipped with the Digital Electronic Warfare System (DEWS), which could detect, track, identify, and categorize radar and electronic signals from potential threats, distinguishing between search, tracking, and targeting systems, as well as locate surface-to-air missiles, and perform jamming and deception against hostile radar. Its cockpit was planned to feature an 11×19–inch Large Area Display (LAD).

The F-15SE was planned to feature the AN/AAQ-33 allowing for precision targeting in various operational conditions, The aircraft was planned to equip Link-16 for situational awareness and data sharing capabilities.

To reduce its radar cross-section (RCS), the F-15SE was designed with conformal weapons bays (CWB) replacing the standard conformal fuel tanks. This allowed for internal carriage of air-to-air missiles, such as AIM-120 and AIM-9, and air-to-ground weapons like Joint Direct Attack Munitions (JDAMs) and Small Diameter Bombs (SDBs), minimizing external hardpoints.
