= F-X fighter program =

Fighter aircraft procurement program

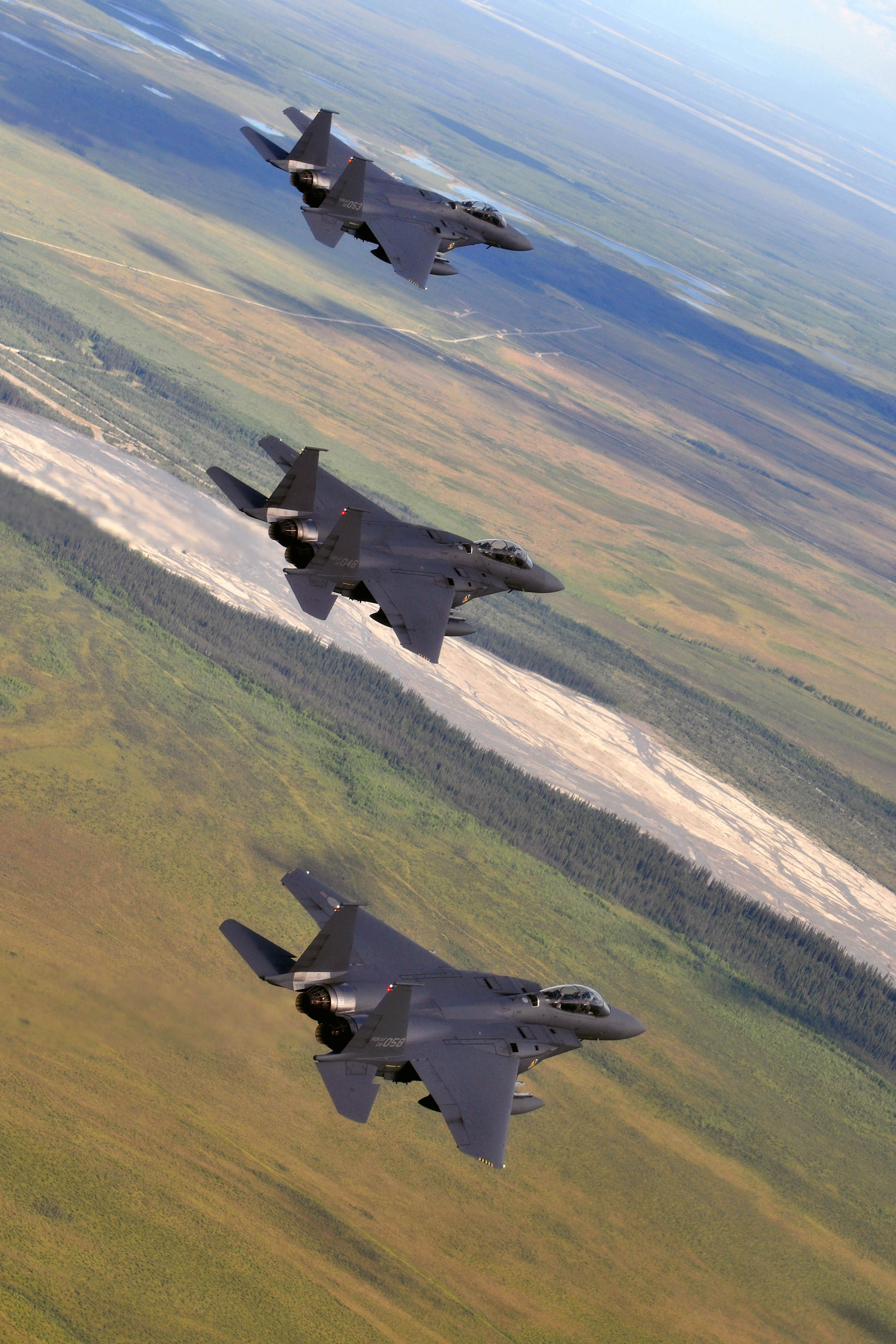
Korean Air Force, 'Red Flag Alaska' Training

The F-X fighter program is a phased procurement program for fighter aircraft for the Republic of Korea Air Force. As of 2018 the air force has purchased 60 F-35 Lightning II fighters.

== F-X Phase 1 ==
The first phase of the F-X program was started in 2002 and resulted in the procurement for ROKAF of the F-15K Slam Eagle. Four designs were reviewed: the Dassault Rafale, Eurofighter Typhoon, Sukhoi Su-35, and the F-15K.

== F-X Phase 2 ==
For the second phase of the F-X program, ROKAF has purchased 21 additional F-15K to compensate for the retirement of their F-5A/B in August 2007. The avionics configuration for the Phase 1 and 2 F-15K remains largely identical, and the only differences are that the weapon compatibility has been increased (Bunker Busters, etc.) and that the engines have been switched from the F110-STW-129A to the F100-PW-229EEP, an improved version of the F100-PW-229. The new engines have commonality with the F100-PW-229 engines on the KF-16 and are compatible with each other, allowing ROKAF the option to interchange the engines among the KF-16 and Phase 2 F-15K. This allows the F-15K to be equipped with a KF-16's F100-PW-229 if necessary.

== F-X Phase 3 ==
The third phase of the F-X project is a bid for an advanced multi-role strike fighter aircraft by 2014, intended to replace the aging F-4 Phantom II and F-5. The rumored purchase number was 40-60 aircraft (9 billion dollar project). The Korean Ministry of Defense had shown interest in the F-22 Raptor, but the United States Department of Defense did not permit the export of this advanced stealth fighter. The only candidates remaining were the F-35 Lightning II Joint Strike Fighter, the Eurofighter Typhoon, and the Boeing F-15SE Silent Eagle. The Sukhoi PAK FA had been shortlisted by DAPA previously, but Sukhoi failed to enter the bidding competition. Saab attended the RFP meeting, but didn't bid its Saab JAS 39 Gripen.

DAPA had set the date of 18 June 2012 for the receipt of proposals with testing and evaluation taking place until September 2012 and with a winner due to be announced in October 2012. However, both Lockheed and EADS failed to submit Korean versions of their pricing and technology transfer details, leaving Boeing as the only vendor to meet the requirement for their proposal. The proposal deadline was extended to July 5. The ROK defense establishment had been resisting calls to delay the decision until after the presidential election.

The decision to purchase 60 fighters was due to be made by mid-2013. Emphasis was put on driving down costs, offsets, and technology transfer. Sources in South Korea said part of the focus of which aircraft to select was being heavily based on technology transfer for the indigenous KF-X aircraft program. The Department of Defense formally notified the U.S. Congress of potential sales of the F-35A Lightning II and F-15SE Silent Eagle on 29 March 2013. Lockheed was pleased that the formal Congressional notification process was under way, but noted that price discussions were "on-going." Boeing felt that the F-15SE was a better bid, as it was cheaper and offered commonality with current F-15K Slam Eagles. However, Boeing's bid was more complicated because it was both a direct commercial sale and government-to-government foreign military sale. The Eurofighter Typhoon was still an option, but it was likely that South Korea would choose to purchase American aircraft, as they had previously. In response, EADS offered to manufacture 48 out of 60 Eurofighter Typhoon Tranche 3 fighters domestically in South Korea. Senior South Korean government officials claimed that the F-X Phase 3 competition was not aimed at defending against or striking North Korea, but for keeping pace with the fighter developments of its neighbors. With Japan's decision to buy the Lockheed F-35A, China's development of the Chengdu J-20, and Russia's work on the Sukhoi PAK FA, South Korea is in need of upgrading its fighter technology.

The bidding was extended because all three initial bids were above the $7.3 billion limit for the 60 aircraft (i.e. more than $121 million per aircraft). During bidding sessions from 18 June to 5 July, Boeing, Lockheed, and EADS submitted 55 separate price proposals. On 10 July 2013, DAPA temporarily suspended bidding, as they were experiencing difficulties in making the companies offer prices within the estimated budget. According to multiple sources, Lockheed did not submit either a fixed price or a maximum price during the bidding process. On 25 July 2013, DAPA announced bidding would resume in "the third week of August." Analysts had said that was unlikely to close the price gap that stalled the previous bids, so DAPA considered various options including reviewing the project, increasing the overall budget, or even a split buy. Bidding resumed from 12 to 16 August and had a required price of $7.45 billion. The Lockheed F-35 was likely to face an early exit because it could not be guaranteed a fixed price.

On the final day of bidding, the F-15SE and Eurofighter Typhoon came within the given budget. DAPA admitted at least one fighter satisfied the procurement price, but declined to announce how many aircraft closed the price gap citing the ongoing procedure. As there were companies that offered price within budget, they proceeded to the next step. DAPA evaluated all three fighters before a committee meeting to pick a winner by September. P Any aircraft that exceeded the budget would not be signed for the contract. There was the possibility that there would be no winner. After Boeing reduced their bid on the F-15SE and the other two were disqualified, the F-15SE appeared to have won the competition, but this was not to be confirmed until mid-September 2013. EADS maintained that the Eurofighter remained in the race and Lockheed said they had not received any official notification regarding bidding results, although sources said the F-35's bid was over-budget. Boeing also said they did not receive any official notification from the Republic of Korea regarding a decision. Some South Korean Air Force officials still pushed for an F-35 order to use for technology transfer for its KF-X domestic fighter program. Others said focusing on acquiring an expensive stealth fighter mainly for technology use would stall the intention of the F-X Phase 3 program to replace the aging F-4s and F-5s.

In September 2013, DAPA said they would recommend buying the F-15SE. Ex-Air Force chiefs had insisted that a stealth plane should be chosen regardless of price. Officials did not want to lengthen the long-delayed project and expect that a radar that can detect stealth aircraft will be developed in a few years. On 24 September 2013, the defense ministry rejected the award and said a new competition would be held to "secure military capability in line with recent aviation technology developments." The more advanced aircraft would allow for preemptive strikes against North Korea's nuclear capability and would also better match the fifth generation fighters of Japan and China. As the Phase 3 project restarted, consideration was given to a split buy with only 20 to 40 stealth fighters, or a smaller initial buy with options to pay for the full force later. Boeing consultant Ronald Fogleman had suggested a split buy of his company's F-15SE and later the F-35A to meet South Korea's near-term and longer-term capabilities. Just buying the F-35A would leave it not fully capable until its software is updated to Block 3F standard in the early 2020s. This would reduce the strength of the South Korean Air Force after 2016 when F-4s and F-5s begin to be retired. Buying F-15SE fighters in the near-term could deliver proven payload carrying abilities until the F-35A software enhances its performance and weapons load. Lockheed responded that F-35s would be fully combat capable by the time they would be delivered to Korea in 2017.

On 22 November 2013, the South Korean state news agency said that the ROK Air Force will purchase 40 F-35A Lightning II fighters for its F-X III requirement. There is an option to buy 20 more aircraft. Deliveries are to begin in 2018, and Lockheed claims it can configure the F-35 for the Block 3F software by then. Despite the F-35 being chosen, South Korea will also obtain 20 unspecified fighters, which leave room for the other F-X III competitors to reach a deal for their aircraft. But Yang Uk of the Korea Defense and Security Forum stated that it was unlikely the remaining 20 fighters beyond the 40 F-35s would be anything other than more F-35s. The F-35's stealth technology and electronic warfare capabilities were chosen to enhance South Korea's "kill chain" system to preemptively detect and destroy North Korean nuclear and missile threats. If a contract is signed in 2014, the 40 Lightning IIs will be delivered from 2018 to 2021. The remaining 20 fighters, be they other planes or more F-35s, will be purchased by 2023. The choice of whether to buy a different aircraft will be based on operational capabilities, changing security situations, and aviation technology development.

In response to the selection of the F-35, EADS embraced the idea of a split buy to include the purchase of their Eurofighter Typhoon. Even though a full order of 60 Eurofighters was favored, EADS accepted the advantages of combining both aircraft for deterrence and overall capabilities. Buying the Eurofighter Typhoon would enable the ROK Air Force to begin reducing the aging fleets of F-4s and F-5s starting in 2017. The Eurofighter is already in production and not at risk of cost escalations or delays, unlike the still developmental F-35. EADS also points out that the U.S. created the F-22 Raptor specifically for air superiority, while the F-35 Lightning II is mainly for strike missions. Some European countries that have bought the F-35 will use it in that role alongside the Eurofighter. Unlike South Korea's plan for 40 F-35s and 20 potential other fighters, EADS is promoting a deal for 40 Eurofighter Typhoons with 20 F-35As. South Korea planned to finalize the purchase for 40 F-35A fighters in the third quarter of 2014.

== Purchase of the Lockheed Martin F-35 Lightning II ==
South Korea formally decided to purchase 40 F-35A Lightning II fighters to fill its F-X III requirement on 24 March 2014. A formal announcement was made by South Korea's Defense Acquisition Program Executive Committee followed by a statement from Lockheed Martin. Neither announcement mentioned the status of the procurement of 20 additional fighters following Lightning II deliveries. South Korea's formal selection of the F-35 purchase was finalized on 24 September 2014.

On 22 December 2017 it was reported that South Korea was moving forward with purchasing the 20 additional F-35 fighters.

The first two F-35A aircraft were delivered to a base near Cheongju in March 2019.

== See also ==
- KAI KF-21 Boramae — Collaborative development (with Indonesia): 4.5 to 5th Generation Replacement aircraft for delivery around 2025.
