= Fire Shadow =

British cancelled loitering munition project

Fire Shadow is a loitering munition designed by MBDA for the British Army. It is designed to loiter above the battlefield for up to 6 hours before attacking stationary or mobile targets. The cost of Phase 1 of the programme, including concept, assessment, demonstration and initial manufacture, was forecast at around £200 million in 2011.

== Design ==
Fire Shadow weighs less than 200 kg and is relatively cheap. It is surface-launched and has a range of approximately 100 km; it can fly to a target area and then loiter for approximately six hours before precision attack on a specific target. Test launches have been performed from a trailer on land.

A Royal Navy brochure released in January 2009 revealed that Fire Shadow was compatible with the space envelope of the SYLVER vertical launch system of the Type 45 destroyer but this option has not been mentioned since the Strategic Defence and Security Review of 2010. MBDA have pursued Maritime Fire Shadow as a private venture, with no customers as yet. Their marketing materials at DSEi in September 2011 showed what appeared to be a similar launcher to that used on land, lashed to the helicopter deck of a frigate or helicopter carrier.

== Progress and cancellation ==
The first complete test firing (a test of flight, navigation and control systems) took place on 21 November 2010 at Vidsel, Sweden, followed by a second on 13 May 2011. Operator training started in 2011, with the first deliveries of production systems in March 2012. It was planned that 39th Regiment Royal Artillery would be the first unit to receive the system and would deploy it operationally in Afghanistan by 2012. This plan, however, never materialised.

In 2013, the National Audit Office (NAO) reported in its 2013 Major Projects Report that after spending £207 million, the Ministry of Defence had yet to decide on a future for the project. However, Fire Shadow was listed in the National Audit Office's 2014 Major Projects Report as being among the eleven largest equipment projects where the Ministry of Defence has taken the main decision to invest. After a period in 'limbo' Fire Shadow was cancelled in the UK's 2017-2018 defence budget.
