= Digital radio frequency memory =

Electronic method for digitally capturing and retransmitting RF signals

Digital Radio Frequency Memory (DRFM) is an electronic method for digitally capturing and retransmitting RF signals. DRFM systems are typically used in radar jamming, although applications in cellular communications are becoming more common.

== Overview ==
A DRFM system is designed to digitize an incoming RF input signal at a frequency and bandwidth necessary to adequately represent the signal, then reconstruct that RF signal when required. The most significant aspect of DRFM is that as a digital "duplicate" of the received signal, it is coherent with the source of the received signal. As opposed to analog "memory loops", there is no signal degradation caused by continuously cycling the energy through a front-end amplifier which allows for greater range errors for reactive jamming and allows for predictive jamming. A DRFM system may modify the signal prior to retransmitting which can alter the signature of the false target; adjusting its apparent radar cross section, range, velocity, and angle. DRFMs present a significant obstacle for radar sensors.

== History ==
The earliest reference to a digital means of storage of RF pulse signals is an article in the Jan/Feb 1975 issue of Electronic Warfare, a publication of the Association of Old Crows, written by Sheldon C. Spector, entitled "A Coherent Microwave Memory Using Digital Storage: The Loopless Memory Loop".

== Examples ==
=== Jamming ===
An example of the application of DRFM in jammers: The DRFM digitizes the received signal and stores a coherent copy in digital memory. As needed, the signal is replicated and retransmitted. Being a coherent representation of the original signal, the transmitting radar will not be able to distinguish it from other legitimate signals it receives and processes as targets. As the signal is stored in memory, it can be used to create false targets both behind (reactive jamming) and ahead of (predictive jamming) the target intended for protection. Slight variations in frequency can be made to create Doppler (velocity) errors in the victim receiver as well. DRFM can also be used to create distorted phase-fronts at the victim receive antenna which is essential for countering monopulse radar angular measurement techniques.

== Use in hardware-in-the-loop (HWIL) simulation ==
Since a DRFM system is designed to create a false target to a radar system, this technology can be employed to perform hardware-in-the-loop simulation. Hardware-in-the-loop simulation is an aid to the development of new radar systems, which allows for testing and evaluation of the radar system earlier in the design cycle. This type of testing reduces the cost of development, for example, expensive initial flight trials for airborne radars can now be moved to the laboratory. The radar can be tested either through direct coupling, or through air coupling with antennas. Testing the radar in a closed loop HWIL environment with a DRFM allows test case scenarios to be simulated that covers a larger number of test parameters than would be possible in open-air test ranges.
