= SiriusXM =

American radio broadcasting corporation

Sirius XM Holdings Inc.
- SiriusXM's logo used since 2023
- Type: Public
- Traded as: Nasdaq: SIRI; S&P 400 component
- Industry: Radio broadcasting
- Predecessors: Sirius Satellite Radio; XM Satellite Radio
- Founded: July 29, 2008; 18 years ago
- Founders: Martine Rothblatt; David Margolese; Robert Briskman
- Headquarters: 1221 Avenue of the Americas, New York City, U.S.
- Area served: United States and Canada
- Key people: Anjali Sud CEO: Greg Maffei (chairman); Jennifer Witz (CEO); Scott Greenstein (president and CCO); Zac Coughlin (CFO)
- Products: Satellite radio; Internet radio
- Revenue: ▼US$8.699 billion (2024)
- Operating income: ▼ −US$1.52 billion (2024)
- Net income: ▼ −US$1.67 billion (2024)
- Total assets: ▼US$27.52 billion (2024)
- Total equity: ▼US$11.07 billion (2024)
- Number of employees: 5,515 (2024)
- Subsidiaries: SiriusXM Radio; Pandora; Stitcher; Automatic Labs; SiriusXM Canada (32.1%)
- Website: siriusxm.com

Sirius XM Holdings Inc. is an American broadcasting corporation headquartered in Midtown Manhattan, New York City, that provides satellite radio and online radio services operating in the United States. The company was formed by the 2008 merger of Sirius Satellite Radio and XM Satellite Radio, merging them into SiriusXM Radio. The company also has a 70% equity interest in SiriusXM Canada, an affiliate company that provides Sirius and XM service in Canada. On May 21, 2013, SiriusXM Holdings, Inc. was incorporated, and in January 2020, SiriusXM reorganized their corporate structure, which made Sirius XM Radio Inc. a direct, wholly owned subsidiary of SiriusXM Holdings, Inc.

The U.S. Federal Communications Commission (FCC) approved the merger of XM Satellite Radio Holdings Inc. and Sirius Satellite Radio, Inc. on July 29, 2008, 17 months after the companies first proposed it. The merger created a company with 18.5 million subscribers, and the deal was valued at US$3.3 billion (equivalent to $4.8 billion in 2025), not including debt. The proposed merger was opposed by those who felt it would create a monopoly. Sirius and XM argued that a merger was the only way that satellite radio could survive.

In September 2018, the company agreed to purchase the streaming music service Pandora, and this transaction was completed on February 1, 2019. As of July 12, 2022, SiriusXM had approximately 34 million subscribers, and claims to be the largest audio entertainment company in North America.

SiriusXM Radio is a primary entry point for the Emergency Alert System.

== Pre-merger ==
=== Early days of Sirius ===
Sirius Satellite Radio was founded by Martine Rothblatt, who was the chairman. Co-founder David Margolese was chief executive officer and Robert Briskman was president and chief operating officer. In 1990, Rothblatt founded Satellite CD Radio in Washington, D.C. The company was the first to petition the FCC to assign unused frequencies for satellite radio broadcast, which "provoked a furor among owners of both large and small [terrestrial] radio stations". In April 1992, Rothblatt resigned as chairman and CEO to start a medical research foundation. Former NASA engineer Briskman, who designed the company's satellite technology, was then appointed chairman and CEO. Six months later, in November 1992, Rogers Wireless co-founder Margolese, who had provided financial backing for the venture, acquired control of the company and succeeded Briskman. Margolese renamed the company CD Radio, and spent the next five years lobbying the FCC to allow satellite radio to be deployed, and the following five years raising US$1.6 billion, which was used to build and launch three satellites into elliptical orbit from Kazakhstan in July 2000. In 1997, after Margolese had obtained regulatory clearance and "effectively created the industry", the FCC also awarded a license to XM Satellite Radio, which followed Sirius' example. In November 1999, marketing chief Ira Bahr convinced Margolese to again change the name of the company, this time to Sirius Satellite Radio, in order to avoid association with the soon-to-be-outdated CD technology. Having secured installation deals with automakers, including BMW, Chrysler and Ford, Sirius launched the initial phase of its service in four cities on February 14, 2002, expanding to the rest of the contiguous United States on July 1, 2002.

In November 2001, Margolese stepped down as CEO, remaining as chairman until November 2003, with Sirius issuing a statement thanking him "for his great vision, leadership and dedication in creating both Sirius and the satellite radio industry". Joe Clayton, former CEO of Global Crossing, followed as CEO from November 2001 until November 2004; stayed on as chairman until July 2008. Mel Karmazin, former president of Viacom, became CEO in November 2004 and remained in that position through the merger, until December 2012.

=== Early days of XM ===
The origin of XM Satellite Radio was a Petition for Rulemaking filed at the Federal Communications Commission (FCC) by regulatory attorney and Founder of Satellite CD Radio Martine Rothblatt, to establish frequencies and licensing rules for the world's first-ever Satellite Digital Audio Radio Service (SDARS). On May 18, 1990, Satellite CD Radio, Inc. (SCDR) filed a Petition for Rule Making in which it requested spectrum to offer Compact Disc quality digital audio radio service to be delivered by satellites and complementary radio transmitters. Following the Allocation NPRM, the FCC established a December 15, 1992, cut-off date for applications proposing satellite DARS to be considered in conjunction with CD Radio's application. One such application came from American Mobile Radio Corporation (AMRC), the predecessor company to XM Satellite Radio. XM Satellite Radio was founded by Lon Levin and Gary Parsons. It has its origins in the 1988 formation of the American Mobile Satellite Corporation (AMSC), a consortium of several organizations originally dedicated to satellite broadcasting of telephone, fax, and data signals. In 1992, AMSC established a unit called the American Mobile Radio Corporation, dedicated to developing a satellite-based digital radio service; this was spun off as XM Satellite Radio Holdings, Inc. in 1998. Its planned financing was complete by July 2000, at which point XM had raised US$1.26 billion (equivalent to $2.2 billion in 2025) and secured installation agreements with General Motors, Honda, and Toyota. Initially scheduled for September 12, 2001, XM's service start date was postponed due to the September 11, 2001, terrorist attacks on the World Trade Center and The Pentagon. XM Satellite Radio's first broadcast was on September 25, 2001, nearly four months before Sirius.

Gary Parsons was chairman of XM Satellite Radio from its inception through the merger, and resigned from the position in November 2009. Hugh Panero was XM's CEO from 1998 until July 2007, shortly after the merger with Sirius was proposed. Nate Davis was appointed interim CEO until the merger was completed, at which point Sirius CEO Mel Karmazin took over as CEO of the newly merged company, SiriusXM.

== Merger ==
=== Announcement ===
After three months of serious negotiations, the US$13 billion (equivalent to $19.4 billion in 2025) merger between Sirius and XM was officially announced on February 19, 2007. At the time, the nation's only two satellite radio providers reported nearly 14 million combined subscribers (with nearly 8 million belonging to XM), with neither having turned an annual profit. Sirius was valued at $5.2 billion (equivalent to $7.8 billion in 2025), and XM at $3.75 billion (equivalent to $5.6 billion in 2025). At the time, each service had been selling subscriptions for $12.95 monthly (equivalent to $20.11 in 2025).

XM and Sirius executives felt the merger would lower programming costs by eliminating overlapping stations and duplicated marketing costs. According to their original operating licenses, the two companies were not allowed to ever own each other's license. In proceeding with the merger, Sirius CEO Mel Karmazin ignored this rule, gambling that the FCC would consider other audio entertainment to be competitors and allow the merger to proceed by waiving the rule.

=== Approval ===
After a 57-week review process, the U.S. Justice Department approved the Sirius and XM merger on March 24, 2008, concluding that satellite radio competes with terrestrial radio, online streaming, and MP3 players and tablets. On July 25, 2008, the FCC approved the merger with a 3–2 vote, determining that it was not a monopoly because of competition on the Internet. The FCC stated that the merger "is in the public interest" and "will benefit consumers by making available to them a wider array of programming choices at various price points and by affording them greater choice and control over the programming to which they subscribe."

As conditions of the FCC's approval, the two companies agreed to allow third parties to make satellite radio devices; produce new radios that can receive both XM and Sirius channels within one year; allow consumers to choose which channels they would like to have; freeze subscription rates for three years; set aside 8% of the combined company's channels for noncommercial programmers; and pay $19.7 million in fines for past rule violations.

The biggest challenge for the newly unified company was selling more subscriptions with the drop in the number of cars sold annually in the U.S., the subsequent reduced demand for cars equipped with satellite radio, as well as online radio-streaming competition. Conditions of the merger included allowing any third-party company to make satellite radio devices; producing new radios that can receive both XM and Sirius channels within one year; allowing consumers to choose which channels they would like to have; freezing subscription rates for three years; setting aside 8% of its channels for noncommercial programmers; and paying US$19.7 million (equivalent to $28.9 million in 2025) in fines for past rule violations. Sirius and XM began merging their channels on November 12, 2008.

Each share of XM stock was replaced with 4.6 shares of Sirius stock. Each company's stockholders initially retained approximately 50% of the joined company. At the time of the merger, Sirius' top programming included channels for Howard Stern, and Martha Stewart; live NBA and NFL games; and live NASCAR and Indycar races. XM's programming included channels for Willie Nelson, Opie and Anthony, Snoop Dogg, and Oprah Winfrey; and live Major League Baseball games.

=== Opposition ===
The National Association of Broadcasters was adamantly opposed to the merger, calling it a monopoly. Shortly after the Justice Department gave its support to the merger without restrictions, attorneys general from 11 states (Connecticut, Iowa, Maryland, Mississippi, Missouri, Nevada, Ohio, Oklahoma, Rhode Island, Utah, and Washington) urged the FCC to impose restrictions on the merger. Several Congressional Democrats also opposed the merger, calling it anticompetitive and criticizing the Bush administration for allowing it to go through.

== Post-merger ==
=== Resurgence and growth ===
After coming close to filing for Chapter 11 bankruptcy protection, only months after the 2008 merger, and having gone so far as to hire lawyers to prepare a possible filing, SiriusXM was able to avoid declaring bankruptcy with the assistance of a US$530 million loan from Liberty Media, the media conglomerate founded by John C. Malone in February 2009. Mel Karmazin negotiated the deal in exchange for a 40% equity stake in SiriusXM.

In the fourth quarter of 2009, SiriusXM posted a profit for the first time, with a net income of US$14.2 million. This came after net losses of US$245.8 million in the year following the merger. The company's resurgence was owed in part to the loan from Liberty Media. Increased automobile sales in the U.S. were also a factor. SiriusXM ended 2009 with 18.8 million subscribers. By the end of 2012, SiriusXM's subscriber base had grown to 23.9 million, mostly due to an increase in partnerships with automakers and car dealers; a strong push in the used-car market; and continued improved car sales in the U.S. in general. The renewal of radio show host Howard Stern's contract through 2015 (US$400 million for five years, US$100 million less than Stern's previous five-year deal) was also a factor in the company's steady growth, as Stern's show attracted over 12 million listeners per week.

By 2017, SiriusXM penetrated approximately 75% in the new car market. Out of that 75%, approximately 40% of owners become subscribers. SiriusXM is now available in cars from every major car company, as well as in assorted trucks, boats and aircraft. The company offers trial subscriptions to new car owners and then offers customers a variety of subscription options. There are more than 100 million cars on the road with SiriusXM radios installed.

After trying for four years, on December 21, 2010, SiriusXM received approval from the FCC to add service in Alaska and Hawaii. SiriusXM announced on January 17, 2011, that it would place repeaters in those states and adjust three of its satellites to cover those areas. The move gave SiriusXM coverage in all 50 states.

On January 12, 2011, XM Satellite Radio, Inc. was dissolved as a separate entity and merged into SiriusXM Radio, Inc. On April 11, 2011, the Canadian Radio-television and Telecommunications Commission (CRTC) approved the merger of Sirius and XM's Canadian affiliates in SiriusXM Canada.

On April 11, 2013, a New York appeals court upheld a New York judge's ruling, from April 2012, that Howard Stern was not entitled to stock bonuses despite SiriusXM having exceeded its subscriber target projections. The trial court ruled that subscribers to XM Satellite Radio from before the SiriusXM merger should not be counted as "Sirius subscribers" for the purposes of Stern's lawsuit. Stern argued the opposite because, among other factors, his popularity had played an integral role in helping Sirius acquire XM. He had been seeking US$330 million in stock bonuses. The trial court declared summary judgment in favor of SiriusXM, and a New York appeals court panel concurred, refusing to hear the case.

On September 24, 2018, SiriusXM announced its intent to acquire Pandora for US$3.5 billion. The acquisition was completed on February 1, 2019. On October 19, 2020, SiriusXM announced that it completed the acquisition of Stitcher. In April 2021, SiriusXM acquired 99% Invisible Inc. the company that produces Roman Mars's 99% Invisible radio show and podcast. In 2022, SiriusXM purchased Conan O'Brien's digital media assets, including his podcast Conan O'Brien Needs a Friend for $150 million.

In March 2023, SiriusXM announced it would cut 475 employees, which amounted to 8% of its workforce. CEO Jennifer Witz cited economic uncertainty and a need to operate with "greater agility and efficiency."

By 2023, Liberty Media had become SiriusXM's majority owner with an 83% stake, which it held through the Liberty SiriusXM Group (LSXM) tracking stock. In September 2023, Liberty proposed to spin off LSXM and combine it with SiriusXM. Existing LSXM stockholders such as John Malone would initially hold combined interests of approximately 84% in the restructured company. The proposal is subject to review by a special committee of SiriusXM's independent directors.

On April 24, 2026, The New York Times reported that SiriusXM was in early talks to merge with IHeartMedia. iHeart previously had a stake in the company until August 2013.

=== Executives ===
Following the merger, Sirius CEO Mel Karmazin became CEO of the combined company, and XM chairman Gary Parsons retained his role. XM CEO and co-founder Hugh Panero stepped down in August 2007, shortly after the merger was first announced.

XM Satellite Radio executives who were not offered jobs in the new combined company were assured golden parachute severance packages that had been approved in 2007. Former CEO Nate Davis received a severance package worth US$10 million. Erik Toppenberg, executive vice president of programming, received a severance package worth US$5.34 million. CFO Joseph Euteneuer received a severance package worth US$4.9 million. Vernon Irvin, chief marketing officer, received a severance package worth US$4.5 million.

In November 2009, Parsons resigned as chairman of SiriusXM, receiving a payout of more than US$9 million. He was succeeded by Eddy Hartenstein, former publisher and CEO of the Los Angeles Times. In December 2012, Mel Karmazin stepped down as SiriusXM CEO after Liberty Media gained control of 49.5% of the company. James E. Meyer was named interim CEO. On April 30, 2013, he was named permanent CEO. Also in April 2013, Liberty Media CEO Greg Maffei was named SiriusXM's chairman, succeeding Hartenstein.

In October 2019, Denise Karkos was named Chief Marketing Officer and in November 2019, Alex Luke was named Senior VP of Digital Content for SiriusXM and Pandora.

In September 2020, SiriusXM announced that Jennifer Witz would succeed James Meyer as the company's CEO once he retires by December 31, 2020. The company also hired AMC Networks Inc's Sean Sullivan as Chief Financial Officer. Witz announced in Nov. 2026 that she was stepping down, and the company announced Tubi CEO Anjali Sud as its next CEO.

In December 2021, Joe Inzerillo, former Chief Technology Officer of Disney Streaming Services, was named the CTO of SiriusXM.

In November 2025 it was announced that Zac Coughlin, Chief Financial Officer of PVH Corp., would become CFO with effect from January 1, 2026.

=== Internet and mobile ===
SiriusXM content is available to stream online either as an add-on to existing subscriptions or as an Internet-only option.

In August 2011, SiriusXM announced that the company would start offering a personalized interactive online radio experience. MySXM debuted on April 15, 2013, allowing users to fine-tune over 50 existing SiriusXM channels. MySXM is available to all SiriusXM subscribers.

The internet player allows subscribers to customize most stations to their liking by adjusting settings like: familiar/hits or unfamiliar/depth, studio recordings or live performances, and new/recent or old/classic material. These customized stations also allow listeners to play music without DJ interruptions. SiriusXM apps also include an extensive lineup of archived programming on SiriusXM On Demand.

On June 17, 2009, SiriusXM released an application for use on Apple's iPhone and iPod Touch, allowing its subscribers to listen to its programming on those devices. The application did not feature all of the programming available to satellite listeners. On March 17, 2011, the application was also made available for the iPad. In 2012, the application was updated for iOS and Android, featuring additional content, and the ability to pause, rewind, and fast-forward through audio streams.

SiriusXM's mobile app (version 3.0), as seen on the iPad Mini

On February 4, 2010, the SiriusXM BlackBerry application was announced, for use on BlackBerry smartphones (the Bold, Curve, Storm, and Tour). As of April 2013, the app featured over 150 channels.

On May 28, 2010, the SiriusXM application for Android smartphones was announced. As of April 2013, the app features over 130 channels.

As part of Howard Stern's new five-year contract with SiriusXM, which he signed on December 9, 2010, The Howard Stern Show, which had not previously been made available on mobile devices, would now be a part of SiriusXM's mobile app package.

On March 18, 2015, SiriusXM released a refreshed user interface of the application on Android and iOS.

As of October 2017, SiriusXM is available for streaming via custom apps on a variety of connected devices including Amazon Alexa and Fire TV, Sonos, PlayStation, Roku, and smart TVs.

In May 2018, SiriusXM unveiled a new look for both the desktop web player and the mobile apps. The MySXM feature, including all the custom mixes that listeners saved over time, was removed. SiriusXM claims that they are working on a more personalized feature that will release in the upcoming months. SiriusXM later expanded their internet and mobile platforms by acquiring Pandora in February 2019.

In early November 2019, SiriusXM became available to stream on all devices that use Google Assistant.

In June 2022, SiriusXM streaming was added to Xfinity customers using the cable provider's X1, Xfinity Flex, and XClass TV platforms.

== Lawsuits ==
=== Deceptive billing practices ===
On December 4, 2014, SiriusXM Holdings agreed to a US$3.8 million settlement with 45 states and the District of Columbia, over a suit initiated by then-Ohio Attorney General Mike DeWine, stemming from the company's billing and service renewal practices. The suit alleged SiriusXM Holdings was engaged in "misleading, unfair and deceptive acts or practices in violation of state consumer protection laws," Attorney General DeWine said.

=== Lifetime subscriptions ===
Following the merger, SiriusXM began offering numerous new options, including à la carte offerings, a family-friendly version, and "mostly music" or "news, sports, and talk" packages, ranging in price from US$6.99 to US$16.99 per month. Prior to the merger, Sirius had offered, for a one-time fee, a lifetime subscription for the radio unit (not the customer's lifetime). After the merger, due to changes in bundling policies and contracts, some customers who had purchased lifetime subscriptions had their service reduced or canceled, and were unable to obtain a refund.

In 2021, a settlement was reached in Alvarez v. Sirius XM Radio Inc. regarding customers with Sirius lifetime subscriptions. All lifetime subscriptions are now for the lifetime of the owner, not the radio unit. Subscriptions can be transferred from one radio to another for $35. Inactive lifetime subscriptions can be cancelled and owners paid $100.

=== Burdensome cancellation process ===
In December 2023, New York Attorney General Letitia James sued SiriusXM for making it excessively difficult for customers to cancel subscriptions, alleging that "Sirius deliberately wastes its subscribers' time even though it has the ability to process cancellations with the click of a button." In November 2024, Judge Lyle Frank found that SiriusXM's "long and burdensome" cancellation process violated the Restore Online Shoppers' Confidence Act and ordered the company to change its cancellation procedures for customers located in New York state.

== Programming ==
SiriusXM is the exclusive home to Howard Stern, with two dedicated Howard Stern channels. SiriusXM's talk, news, and comedy programming features channels from many news outlets, including: BBC, CNBC, Fox News, CNN, MSNBC, Bloomberg, NPR, and C-SPAN. The programming also includes exclusive talk and entertainment channels such as TODAY Show Radio, Business Radio Powered By The Wharton School, The Jeff Lewis Channel, Faction Talk, Radio Andy, Joel Osteen Radio, and comedy from channels including Comedy Central Radio, Comedy Greats, Jeff & Larry's Comedy Roundup, Netflix is a Joke Radio and Conan O'Brien Radio.

SiriusXM music programming includes channels dedicated to multiple decades and genres that span rock, pop, country, R&B, hip-hop, electronic dance, jazz such as The Heat, Pop2K, Ozzy's Boneyard, Y2Kountry and more, and concept-based channels, such as The Coffee House, SiriusXM Chill, Road Trip Radio, and Yacht Rock Radio.

The service also features several artist-branded channels, including those for The Beatles, Jimmy Buffett, Kenny Chesney, Kelly Clarkson, Dave Matthews Band, Diplo, Eminem, Kirk Franklin, Grateful Dead, Billy Joel, B.B. King, LL Cool J, Bob Marley, John Mayer, Metallica, Willie Nelson, Ozzy Osbourne, Pearl Jam, Tom Petty, Phish, Pitbull, Elvis Presley, Red Hot Chili Peppers, Smokey Robinson, Shaggy, Frank Sinatra, Bruce Springsteen, Chris Stapleton, U2, Carrie Underwood, Morgan Wallen, Steven Van Zandt, and Dwight Yoakam. On occasion, SiriusXM has offered limited edition artists channels for a specific period of time, including those for Taylor Swift, Drake, David Bowie, Fleetwood Mac, Prince, Dolly Parton, Guns N' Roses, Led Zeppelin, George Strait, The Rolling Stones, Eagles, Queen, Beastie Boys, Coldplay, Michael Jackson, Foo Fighters, Aretha Franklin, Miles Davis, Jimi Hendrix, ABBA, Alicia Keys, Neil Young, and Blue Rodeo.

SiriusXM offers live play-by-play coverage of every NFL, MLB, NBA and NHL game; every NASCAR and Indycar race; PGA Tour events; and live college sports, as well as news, analysis and opinions from more than a dozen dedicated sports talk channels.

SiriusXM also offers "Listen Free" events twice a year during late May-early June and late November-early December.

== Canadian counterparts ==
In Canada, Sirius Canada and XM Canada were partially owned by SiriusXM (20% and 23.3% respectively) in joint ventures with Canadian companies. After the U.S. merger, the two Canadian ventures did not immediately agree to a similar merger, but instead remained in competition as distinct services. Complicating matters was that Sirius Canada has nearly 80% of the total satellite radio subscriber base in that country, and felt they deserved greater than a 50/50 split of the new company, whereas XM Canada felt their deal with the NHL – a particularly lucrative prize in Canadian sports broadcasting – also warranted a significant amount of value in the new company.

On November 24, 2010, XM Radio Canada and Sirius Canada announced that they would merge their services. On April 12, 2011, the CRTC approved the companies' merger into SiriusXM Canada. John Bitove's Canadian Satellite Radio Holdings Inc., the licensee of XM Canada, gained a 30% share in the new company as its primary and controlling shareholder, while Slaight Communications and the Canadian Broadcasting Corporation, the current owners of Sirius Canada, each retained 20% ownership. SiriusXM's American parent company would hold 25%. The merger was completed on June 21, 2011. Sirius XM Holdings now owns a 70% equity interest and a 33% voting interest in SiriusXM Canada, as of 2020.

== Technical ==
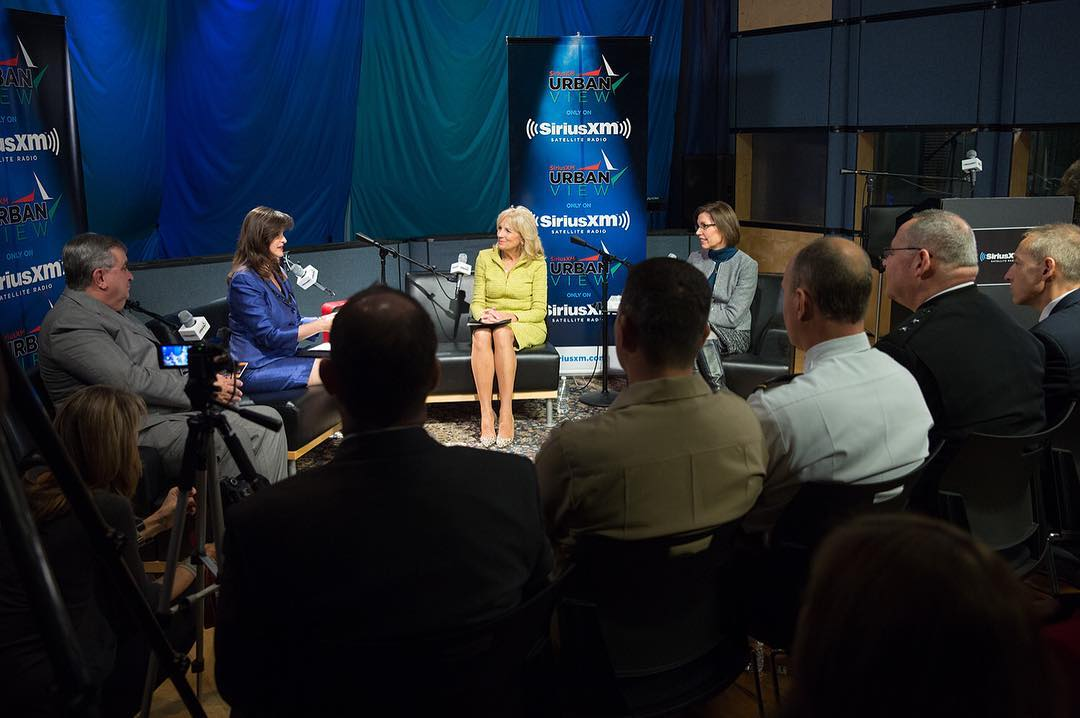
Jill Biden at the SiriusXM studio at Rockefeller Plaza participating in a round table about mental health care in 2016

=== Receivers ===
XM and Sirius use different compression and conditional access systems, making their receivers incompatible with each other's service. A condition of the merger was that SiriusXM would market satellite radios that could receive both XM and Sirius signals within one year. The interoperable radio, called MiRGE, was available in March 2009. However, the MiRGE radio was later discontinued because the two companies eliminated duplicate channels, thus removing the need for the specialty radio. As of February 2016, SiriusXM offers radios for use in different environments, including for home, office, automotive, marine and aviation use.

SiriusXM Marine is a graphical weather and fishing informational system for boaters. The service works with most major marine-electronics hardware companies, such as Raymarine, Furuno, Simrad and Garmin. The service offers visual depictions of various weather and sporting conditions, based on the package and device. The Marine Offshore package includes graphic weather radar, cloud-to-cloud and cloud-to-ground lightning, high-resolution coastal and offshore wave heights, direction and intervals, high-resolution sea-surface temperatures, pressure isobars, buoy data, etc.

SiriusXM Aviation provides satellite-based graphic weather information for pilots, which provides better signal coverage and faster data refresh rate than land-based ADS-B service. The 2020 FAA Mandate does not require pilots to equip with ADS‑B/FIS‑B weather.

SiriusXM Aviation receiver Model SXAR1 and Garmin GDL51/GDL52 let pilots use an iPad or iPhone with the ForeFlight Mobile App, via Bluetooth, to view the SiriusXM Aviation in-flight weather and data delivered via satellite. Thus, aviators can monitor storm fronts, track lightning strikes, TAFs, METARs, winds and more from their mobile device.

Beginning with Stellantis' 2019 Ram 1500, SiriusXM rolled out its 360L platform, which allows receivers to use both satellite signals and streaming content delivered via the vehicle's on-board cellular data modem, the latter providing additional channels previously restricted to the SiriusXM app as well as personalized content and on-demand programming. Over subsequent model years, the platform has rolled out to other vehicles produced by Stellantis and other manufacturers including BMW, Ford, General Motors, Nissan, and the Volkswagen Group.

=== Satellites ===
As of January 2025, there are six functional satellites in orbit: two XM (one being a spare), two Sirius, and two SXM. XM-3 is an in-orbit spare while XM-5 is in active operation. XM-3 and XM-4 (defunct) replaced the original XM-1 and XM-2 satellites (which were placed into disposal orbits). Sirius FM-5 and FM-6 function as the primaries for the Sirius side. FM-6 was launched on October 25, 2013, and was declared ready for service on December 2, 2013. The satellite initially served as an in-orbit spare while the company worked to deploy repeaters for the Sirius side, which were needed to transition to full geostationary orbit operation. In 2016, FM-6 was put into active service and officially replaced Sirius originals FM-1 through FM-3 which operated in elliptical orbit. FM-1 through FM-3 were later placed into disposal orbits. With this change, FM-5 and FM-6 exclusively serve the Sirius service. Before FM-6 was launched, XM-5 was sent into orbit by Proton from Kazakhstan, on October 14, 2010. It is capable of broadcasting to either service. In late 2016, SiriusXM placed an order for two new satellites SXM-7 and SXM-8 which were intended to replace XM-3 and XM-4 and have the capability to deliver either Sirius or XM content to radio receivers. SXM-7 was launched December 13, 2020, via a SpaceX Falcon 9 (failed after being successfully placed into orbit), while SXM-8 was launched on June 6, 2021 (delayed due to failure of SXM-7). SXM-9 was successfully launched by a SpaceX Falcon 9 rocket on December 5, 2024, and put into service in 2025.

Sirius satellites broadcast within the S-band frequencies from 2.3200 to 2.3325 GHz, while XM radio uses adjacent frequencies 2.3325–2.3450 GHz.

==== Operational satellites ====
- Sirius FM-5 (Radiosat 5, COSPAR 2009-034A) – Launch occurred on June 30, 2009.
- Sirius FM-6 (Radiosat 6, COSPAR 2013-058A) – Launch occurred on October 25, 2013.
- XM-3 (Rhythm, COSPAR 2005-008A) – Launch occurred on February 28, 2005. Was replaced in active service by SXM-8 and became an in-orbit spare.
- XM-5 (COSPAR 2010-053A) – Launch occurred on October 14, 2010. Initially operated as in-orbit spare, later replaced XM-4 in active service. As of April 2025, it currently broadcasts to the XM service along with SXM-8.
- SXM-8 – Launch occurred on June 6, 2021, by a SpaceX Falcon 9 launch vehicle. Currently broadcasts to the XM service along with XM-5. Will become in-orbit spare when SXM-9 begins active service.
- SXM-9 (COSPAR 2024-234A) – Launch occurred on December 5, 2024, from Kennedy Space Center Launch Complex 39A. Replaced SXM-7. It will take SXM-8's position in the constellation in 2025. SXM-8 will become the in-orbit spare.
- SXM-10 (COSPAR 2025-122A) was ordered in August 2021 and launched June 7, 2025 on a SpaceX Falcon 9
- SXM-11, was ordered in November 2022 and launched in June 2026 on a SpaceX Falcon 9.

==== Future satellites ====
- SXM-12 – SXM-12 was ordered in November 2022.

==== Defunct satellites ====
- Sirius FM-1 (Radiosat 1) – launched June 30, 2000; decommissioned in 2016
- Sirius FM-2 (Radiosat 2) – launched September 5, 2000; decommissioned in 2016
- Sirius FM-3 (Radiosat 3) – launched November 30, 2000; decommissioned in 2016
- Sirius FM-4 (Radiosat 4) – Ground spare, was not launched into orbit. In October 2012, it was donated for display to the National Air and Space Museum's Steven F. Udvar-Hazy Center.
- XM-1 (Roll, COSPAR 2001-018A) – Launch occurred on May 8, 2001. Retired in 2016 and deorbited.
- XM-2 (Rock, COSPAR 2001-012A) – Launch occurred on March 18, 2001. Deorbited.
- XM-4 (Blues, COSPAR 2006-049A) – Launch occurred on October 30, 2006. Deorbit expected by 2023.
- SXM-7 – Launch occurred on December 13, 2020 by a SpaceX Falcon 9 launch vehicle. It was intended to replace XM-3. On January 27, 2021, SiriusXM announced that the satellite suffered failures during in-orbit testing, but did not provide detail on the nature of those failures.
Animation of the decommissioned, original Sirius polar fleet plus the active geostationary FM-5

Around the Earth

Earth fixed frame – Equatorial view

Earth fixed frame – Polar view

Earth · Sirius FM-5 · Sirius FM-1 · Sirius FM-2 · Sirius FM-3

== Milestones ==
The following milestones have been set during and after the merger:

Date	Event	Comments
February 2007	Execute definitive agreement	
March 2007	File FCC application	
June 2007	FCC places application on "Public Notice" (DA 07–2417)	Comments and petitions were due July 11, 2007; responses and oppositions were due July 24, 2007.
November 2007	Sirius/XM shareholder votes	Announced October 4, 2007, and voted upon on November 13, 2007. 96% of Sirus shareholders approved the merger, and 99.8% of XMSR shareholders also approved.
March 2008	Receive regulatory approvals	On March 24, 2008, the U.S. Department of Justice ended its investigation of the merger (i.e. decided against blocking the deal).
July 2008	Receive FCC approval	On July 25, 2008, the FCC approved the merger voting 3–2.
July 2008	Merger completed	XM stock trading ends July 28, 2008. Sirius XM Radio, Inc. becomes the name of the merged corporation.
November 2008	Programming merged	
March 2009	MiRGE released	First receiver being compatible with both Sirius and XM signals is released
December 2010	Alaska and Hawaii expansion	Receives FCC approval to add service to the two states, thus giving SiriusXM coverage in all 50 states
April 2013	MySXM debuts	A personalized interactive online radio experience
October 2013	Clear Channel-programmed stations removed	Channels programmed by Clear Channel, including America's Talk, Sixx Sense, Fox Sports Radio and WSIX-FM, are removed months after Clear Channel sells its stake in SiriusXM; WHTZ/New York and KIIS-FM/Los Angeles are retained under a separate agreement.
April 2016	Surpasses 30 million subscribers	SiriusXM announces through Q1 of 2016, the company has a total of 30.1 million subscribers.
January 2020	Investment in SoundCloud announced	US$75 million investment for ad partnership
June 2022	Last iHeartMedia-programmed station removed	KIIS-FM/Los Angeles, the last station programmed by iHeartMedia (formerly Clear Channel) on the SiriusXM platform, leaves as part of a pivot to iHeartRadio. WHTZ/New York was removed from the satellite service in 2020.

== See also ==
- 1worldspace, former company
- List of SiriusXM channels
