= Betbunia =

Betbunia may refer to:

- Betbunia Union, an union of Rangamati District
- Betbunia Satellite Ground Station, first Satellite Ground Station in Bangladesh
- Betbunia, Khulna, a village in Khulna District
