= Stiletto (disambiguation) =

A stiletto is a type of dagger.

Stiletto may also refer to:

== Military ==
- M80 Stiletto, a prototype naval ship proposed for the United States Navy SEALs
- USS Stiletto, an early wooden torpedo boat
- UR-100N, a Russian intercontinental ballistic missile, also known as the "S-19 Stiletto"
- Douglas X-3 Stiletto, an experimental jet by Douglas Aircraft

== Arts and entertainment ==
=== Film and television ===
- Stiletto (1969 film), an American crime film
- Stiletto (2008 film), an American direct-to-video action film
- "Stiletto", an episode of Smallville; also alternate identity of Lois Lane in that episode
- Stiletto Mafiosa, a recurring character in the TV series, Danger Mouse

=== Music ===
- Stiletto (album), a 1990 album by Lita Ford
- Stiletto, a 1989 album by Michael Shrieve
- Stiletto, an Australian pop, rock group (1976–1979), which included Jane Clifton
- "Stiletto", a song by Billy Joel from the album 52nd Street
- "Stilettos", a 2005 song by Crime Mob
- "Stilettos", a 2015 song by Kelsea Ballerini
- "Stilettos", a 2010 single by Sirens

=== Other arts and entertainment ===
- Stiletto (comics), a Marvel Comics character
- Stiletto (novel), a 2016 novel by Daniel O'Malley
- Stiletto, a 1960 novel by Harold Robbins

== Technology ==
- Sunbeam Stiletto, a British car
- GM-X Stiletto, a 1964 General Motors concept car
- Sirius Stiletto 100, a Sirius satellite radio portable unit
- Sirius Stiletto 2, a Sirius satellite radio portable unit
- Stiletto 27, an American catamaran design

== Other uses ==
- stitching awl, a tool used in sewing
- Stiletto heel, a type of footwear
- Stiletto snake, a common name for a family of venomous snakes found in Africa and the Middle East
- Therevidae, a family of flies commonly called stiletto flies
- Stilleto Peak, Washington State, United States
