= List of SiriusXM satellites =

Communications satellites used by the Sirius XM satellite radio service

As of 2026, the SiriusXM satellite radio service operates using a fleet of seven communications satellites in a geostationary orbit.

== Active ==
Name	COSPAR ID	Manufacturer and model	Launched	Notes
XM-3 ('Rhythm')	2005-008A	Boeing Satellite Systems	February 28, 2005 Sea Launch Zenit-3SL from Odyssey	Replaced in active service by SXM-8 in 2021; remains in use as in-orbit spare
Sirius FM-5 ('Radiosat 5')	2009-034A	Space Systems/Loral 1300	June 30, 2009 Proton Breeze M from Baikonur Cosmodrome	
XM-5	2010-053A	Space Systems/Loral 1300	October 14, 2010 Proton Breeze M from Baikonur Cosmodrome	ordered in 2005
Sirius FM-6 ('Radiosat 6')	2013-058A	Space Systems/Loral 1300	October 25, 2013 Proton Breeze M from Baikonur Cosmodrome	
SXM-8	2021-049A	Maxar Space Systems	June 6, 2021 SpaceX Falcon 9 from Cape Canaveral Launch Complex 40	Planned to become in-orbit spare when SXM-9 begins active service
SXM-9	2024-234A	Maxar Space Systems	December 5, 2024 SpaceX Falcon 9 from Cape Canaveral Launch Complex 40	Replaced SXM-7; scheduled to take SXM-8's position in the constellation in 2025
SXM-10	2025-122A	Maxar Space Systems	June 7, 2025 SpaceX Falcon 9 from Cape Canaveral Launch Complex 40	Ordered in August 2021
SXM-11	2026-148A	Lanteris Space Systems/IM-1300	June 28, 2026 SpaceX Falcon 9 from Cape Canaveral Launch Complex 40	

== Future ==
Two new satellites, SXM-11 and SXM-12, were ordered from Maxar Space Systems in November 2022.

== Decommissioned ==
=== Elliptical ===
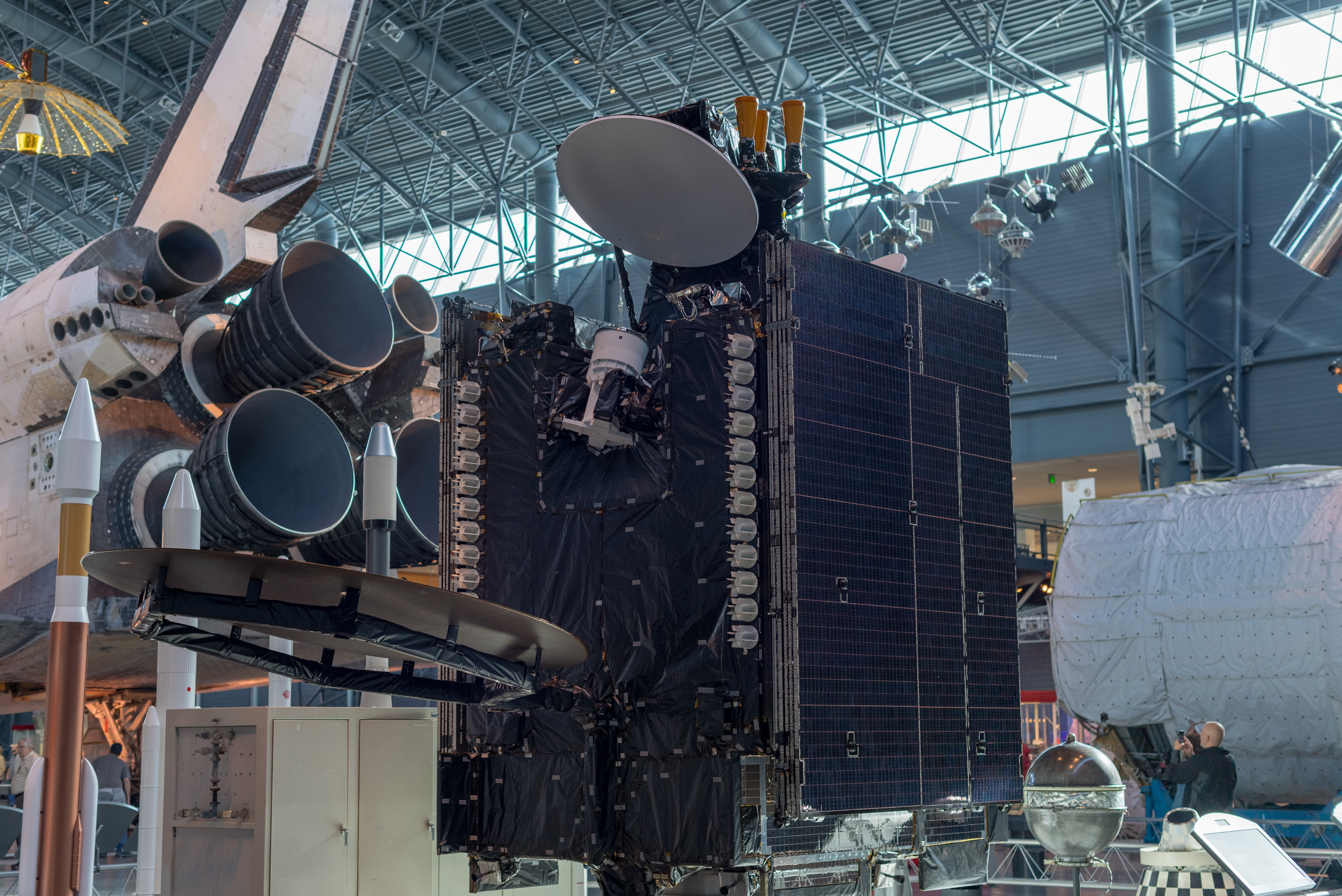
Sirius FM-4 on display in 2017

Prior to the merger, the Sirius Satellite Radio service operated with three satellites in a highly elliptical orbit. Following the merger, the combined Sirius XM adopted XM's geostationary pattern, though Sirius's original satellites remained in service until 2016, when they were decommissioned and placed into disposal orbit.

Name	COSPAR ID	Manufacturer and model	Launched	Retired
Sirius FM-1 ('Radiosat 1')	2000-035A	Space Systems/Loral	June 30, 2000	2016
Sirius FM-2 ('Radiosat 3')	2000-051A	Space Systems/Loral	September 5, 2000 Proton from Baikonur Cosmodrome	2016
Sirius FM-3 ('Radiosat 3')	2000-077A	Space Systems/Loral	November 30, 2000 Proton from Baikonur Cosmodrome	2016

Sirius FM-4, also built by Space Systems/Loral, was a ground spare that was never launched. It was donated to the National Air and Space Museum in October 2012, and is currently displayed at the Steven F. Udvar-Hazy Center.

Animation of the decommissioned, original Sirius polar fleet plus the active geostationary FM-5

Around the Earth

Earth fixed frame – Equatorial view

Earth fixed frame – Polar view

Earth · Sirius FM-5 · Sirius FM-1 · Sirius FM-2 · Sirius FM-3

=== Geostationary ===
Name	COSPAR ID	Manufacturer and model	Launched	Retired	Notes
XM-1 ('Roll')	2001-018A	Boeing Satellite Systems 702	May 8, 2001 Sea Launch Zenit-3SL from Odyssey	2016	
XM-2 ('Rock')	2001-012A	Boeing Satellite Systems 702	March 18, 2001 Sea Launch Zenit-3SL from Odyssey		
XM-4 ('Blues')	2006-049A	Boeing Satellite Systems 702	October 30, 2006 Sea Launch Zenit-3SL from Odyssey		
SXM-7	2020-096A	Maxar Space Systems	December 13, 2020 SpaceX Falcon 9 from Cape Canaveral Launch Complex 40	January 2021	Failed during in-orbit testing
