= Betbunia Satellite Ground Station =

First satellite ground station in Bangladesh

Betbunia Satellite Earth Station
- Location: Rangamati District, Chittagong Division, Bangladesh
- Coordinates: 22°32′51″N 91°59′45″E
- Built: June 14, 1975; 51 years ago
- Diameter: 30 m (98 ft 5 in)
- Location within Bangladesh

Betbunia Satellite Ground Station (Bengali: বেতবুনিয়া ভূ-উপগ্ৰহ কেন্দ্র) is a telecommunications satellite center established in Bangladesh in 1975. Located in Betbunia, Kowkhali Upazila, about 33 kilometres (21 mi) from the district headquarters of Rangamati, beside the Chittagong-Rangamati road, the center is Bangladesh's first ground station. Established on 128 acres (52 ha) of land, the center maintains communication systems with satellites. Bangladesh's first telecommunications parabolic antenna was installed at this center. The center is primarily used as a receiver and transmitter of telecommunications, fax, telex, and telecom information. Since 2018, it has been active as Bangladesh's first geostationary communications and broadcasting satellite's second ground control center. In terms of operational scope, Betbunia is considered Bangladesh's standard 'A' type center.

== History ==
The construction of the station began on January 30, 1970. It was operational from June 14, 1975. Betbunia has been connected with American artificial satellites and the Intelsat satellites in the Indian Ocean region, since its inception. Until the establishment of the second ground center in Talibabad on January 26, 1982, for a long time, it was the only means of receiving and sending international calls in Bangladesh. It is used for telecommunications with Saudi Arabia, Singapore, Hong Kong, Oman, Pakistan, Kuwait, Qatar, Bahrain, Japan, the United Arab Emirates, and India. In 1989 it was partially, and in 1998 fully equipped with new apparatus to digitalize the center by NEC.

In 2016, Thales Alenia established a ground control center here for the post-launch management of Bangladesh's first satellite. The ground control center was expanded on a five-acre area of the main center under the name 'Secondary Satellite Ground Center'. On July 31, 2018, Betbunia was added as the second or auxiliary ground center for Bangladesh's first domestically owned artificial satellite. Prior to that, it began receiving experimental signals from May 12.

== Capacity ==
Betbunia has a total of 40 transponders with a vibration capacity of 1,600 megahertz. Its antenna has a diameter of 30 meters (98 ft). It is capable of receiving and transmitting microwave signals from a satellite located 35,900 kilometres (22,300 mi) above the Earth.
