= Briskman =

Briskman is a Jewish surname literally meaning "Brisk man", derived from the Yiddish name Brisk for the town of Brest, Belarus. Notable people with the surname include:

- Juli Briskman, American politician and journalist
- Robert Briskman (born 1932), an official with Sirius Satellite Radio

== See also ==
- Brisker
