= Sirius FM-5 =

Satellite radio communications satellite operated by SiriusXM

- Mission type: Communication
- Operator: Sirius XM Radio
- COSPAR ID: 2009-034A
- SATCAT no.: 35493
- Mission duration: 15 years

Spacecraft properties
- Bus: LS-1300
- Manufacturer: Space Systems Loral
- Launch mass: 5,820 kilograms (12,830 lb)

Start of mission
- Launch date: 30 June 2009, 19:10:00 UTC
- Rocket: Proton-M/Briz-M
- Launch site: Baikonur 200/39
- Contractor: ILS

Orbital parameters
- Reference system: Geocentric
- Regime: Geostationary
- Longitude: 86.2° west
- Perigee altitude: 35,784 kilometers (22,235 mi)
- Apogee altitude: 35,801 kilometers (22,246 mi)
- Inclination: 0.01 degrees
- Period: 24 hours
- Epoch: January 21, 2014, 08:13:09 UTC

Transponders
- Band: 1 E/F/I-band
- Coverage area: North America

Sirius FM-5, also known as Radiosat 5, is an American communications satellite which is operated by Sirius XM Radio. It was constructed by Space Systems Loral, based on the LS-1300 bus, and carries a single transponder designed to transmit in the NATO E, F and I bands (IEEE S and X bands). It is currently being used to provide satellite radio broadcasting to North America.

Sirius FM-5 was launched by a Proton-M/Briz-M rocket flying from Site 200/39 at the Baikonur Cosmodrome. The launch was conducted by International Launch Services, and occurred at 19:10 GMT on 30 June 2009. Around nine hours after launch, the satellite separated from the carrier rocket into a geosynchronous transfer orbit. It will raise itself into geostationary orbit by means of its onboard R-4D apogee motor. It also carries four SPT-100 engines for manoeuvring.

It is the first Sirius Radio satellite to be placed in geostationary orbit; the three previous Sirius satellites operate in tundra orbits (and the fourth satellite, Sirius FM-4, was a ground spare that was never launched into space). Originally placed at 96° west, it was moved to 86.2° west alongside XM-5.

Animation of Sirius's orbit

Around the Earth

Earth fixed frame - Equatorial view

Earth fixed frame - Polar view

Earth · Sirius FM-5 · Sirius FM-1 · Sirius FM-2 · Sirius FM-3

== See also ==
- Sirius FM-1
- Sirius FM-2
- Sirius FM-3
