= Digital audio radio service =

US classification for digital radio services

Digital audio radio service (DARS) is any type of digital radio program service. In the United States it is the official FCC term for digital radio services.

The most popular type of DARS in the U.S. and Canada is SDARS (Satellite Digital Audio Radio Service), used by Sirius Satellite Radio and XM Satellite Radio. XM and Sirius both operate in the 2.3-GHz S band, from 2320 to 2345 MHz.

Increasing the spectrum available for more services would be difficult, since unlike C-band and K_{u} band services, which allow over 200 locations for satellites, S-band satellites must be spaced far apart, with current technology. Existing vehicle antennas would not allow reception of two different stations on the same frequency, though new technology, requiring a new kind of receiver, might be possible.

WorldSpace also operated a DARS network outside the United States and Canada with a footprint covering Europe, Asia, the Middle East and Africa. It used the L-band.

== Spectrum resources ==
In 1992, the World Administrative Radio Conference (WARC) allocated satellite radio services the 2310–2360 MHz band for Broadcasting Satellite Services (audio).

In the United States, from this global allocation, satellite radio (SDARS) services are allocated a subset, the 25MHz from 2320–2345 MHz. This band is further broken down into sub-bands for space-to-ground and terrestrial broadcasts:

Lower	Upper Frequency	Usage and original service user
2320 MHz	2324.54 MHz	Satellite (Sirius)
2324.54 MHz	2327.96 MHz	Terrestrial Repeaters (Sirius)
2327.96 MHz	2332.5 MHz	Satellite (Sirius)
2332.5 MHz	2336.225 MHz	Satellite (XM)
2336.225 MHz	2341.285 MHz	Terrestrial Repeaters (XM)
2341.285 MHz	2345 MHz	Satellite (XM)

== Digital Satellite Broadcasting Corporation ==
Digital Satellite Broadcasting Corporation was one of four companies bidding for Satellite Digital Audio Radio Service, or SDARS, licenses in the United States. The service would have been a listener-supported subscription digital audio service.

1990: Sirius Satellite Radio, known then as Satellite CD Radio Inc., proposes the concept of a satellite-delivered digital radio service to the Federal Communications Commission.

1995 January: The FCC sets aside 50 MHz (2310 MHz through 2360 MHz) in the S-band for Satellite Digital Audio Radio Service, also known as SDARS and now commonly known as Satellite Radio.

1997 April: American Mobile Satellite Corporation and Satellite CD Radio, Inc. are each awarded SDARS licenses. The companies eventually become known XM Satellite Radio and Sirius Satellite Radio, respectively. Primosphere Limited Partnership and Digital Satellite Broadcasting Corporation are denied licenses by becoming third and fourth lowest bidders, respectively, during the auction.

2001 September 25: XM Satellite Radio officially launches.

2002 July 1: Sirius Satellite Radio officially launches.

== See also ==
- Digital audio
- Digital Audio Broadcasting (DAB)
- Direct broadcast satellite
- Satellite radio
