= Sirius Stiletto =

- Sirius Stiletto 2
- Manufacturer: Sirius Satellite Radio
- Type: portable media player
- Online services: satellite radio

Sirius Stiletto was a brand of satellite radio portable media players from Sirius Satellite Radio. The original model, the Stiletto 100, was launched in October 2006. (A predecessor, the Sirius S50, was portable but was unable to receive satellite signal unless docked.) The successor to the Stiletto 100, the Stiletto 2, was launched in November 2007.

These devices run Linux and the end-user software in these devices is powered by the Mono Framework a portable .NET implementation for many platforms, including embedded Linux systems such as the Stiletto.

Sirius discontinued the Stiletto line of products in early 2010, even though its ostensible successor (the Lynx) wouldn't hit the market for more than two years. This meant that consumers looking to purchase a portable Sirius radio during that time had only one option: purchase the XMP3i (an XM portable radio), sign up for XM Satellite Radio service, and then pay an extra fee for access to Sirius channels. Alternately, users could also download one of the smartphone apps (for iPhone, Android, or BlackBerry) which were released later in 2010, but these do not offer many of the features and advantages that standalone portable satellite radios provide.

== Models ==
The original Sirius Stiletto 100 was designed by Ziba Design with technology from Zing (now a part of Dell). Current Stiletto models:

1. Sirius Stiletto 100, the first portable Sirius radio that allows subscribers to listen to live Sirius programming. The Stiletto boasts a 2 gigabyte memory, which is roughly equivalent to 100 hours of recording time. The unit's batteries give the user approximately 30 hours of life. The unit also features Wi-Fi technology, which is used as a backup to stream music from the Internet when a clear signal strength is not readily available from the built-in antenna. Sirius' partnerships with Napster and Yahoo Music provide additional content for Stiletto users.
2. Sirius Stiletto 10, a later revision of the Stiletto 100. The Stiletto 10, unlike its predecessor, does not offer Wi-Fi or MP3/WMA playback and only offers 256 megabytes of storage space (about 10 hours of Sirius programming). The Stiletto 10 offers Artist and Song Seek - Not featured on the Stiletto 100 or Stiletto 2. This seek function will watch for your favorite artists and songs that you want to hear and will let you know when they are playing on any other station.
3. Sirius Stiletto 2, the newest portable Sirius radio. A slimmer, improved version of the Stilleto 100. Has microSD slot behind battery for storing MP3/WMA files and playlists (not Sirius content). Wi-Fi support expanded to handle WPA and WPA2 (non-Enterprise) with passcodes.

Music stored on Sirius Stiletto radios can be managed with the My Sirius Studio jukebox software, which can also organize music on Stiletto 2 microSD cards.
