= Brisker =

Brisker (Yiddish: בריסק), derived from the Yiddish name Brisk for the town of Brest, Belarus, is a Jewish surname and a Rabbibic appellation. Notable people with the surname include:

- Reb Chaim Brisker (Soloveitchik) (1853–1918), rabbi and Talmudist
- Eliyahu Brisker - One of the founders of Tel Aviv and Ramat Gan
- Yehuda Brisker - writer, playwright, journalist, radio broadcaster and Hebrew editor
- Brisker Rov ("rabbi of/from Brisk") (1886 in Valozhyn – 1959)
- Gordon Brisker (1937–2004), American jazz tenor saxophonist
- Jaquan Brisker (born 1999), American football player
- John Brisker (born 1947), American basketball player
- Mark Brisker (born 1969), American-Israeli basketball player
- Michael Brisker (born 1998), Israeli basketball player

== See also ==
- Briskman
