= Betbunia, Khulna =

Coordinates: 22°31′37″N 89°23′37″E

Betbunia is a village in Paikgachha Upazila, Khulna District in the Division of Khulna, Bangladesh.
