= Robert Briskman =

American radio executive (born 1932)

Robert D. Briskman
- Born: October 15, 1932 (age 94); New York City, New York, U.S.
- Education: Princeton University (B.S., Engineering, 1954); University of Maryland (M.S.E.E., 1961)
- Occupations: Technical Executive of Sirius XM Radio; On the Board of Directors of GenMobi Technologies

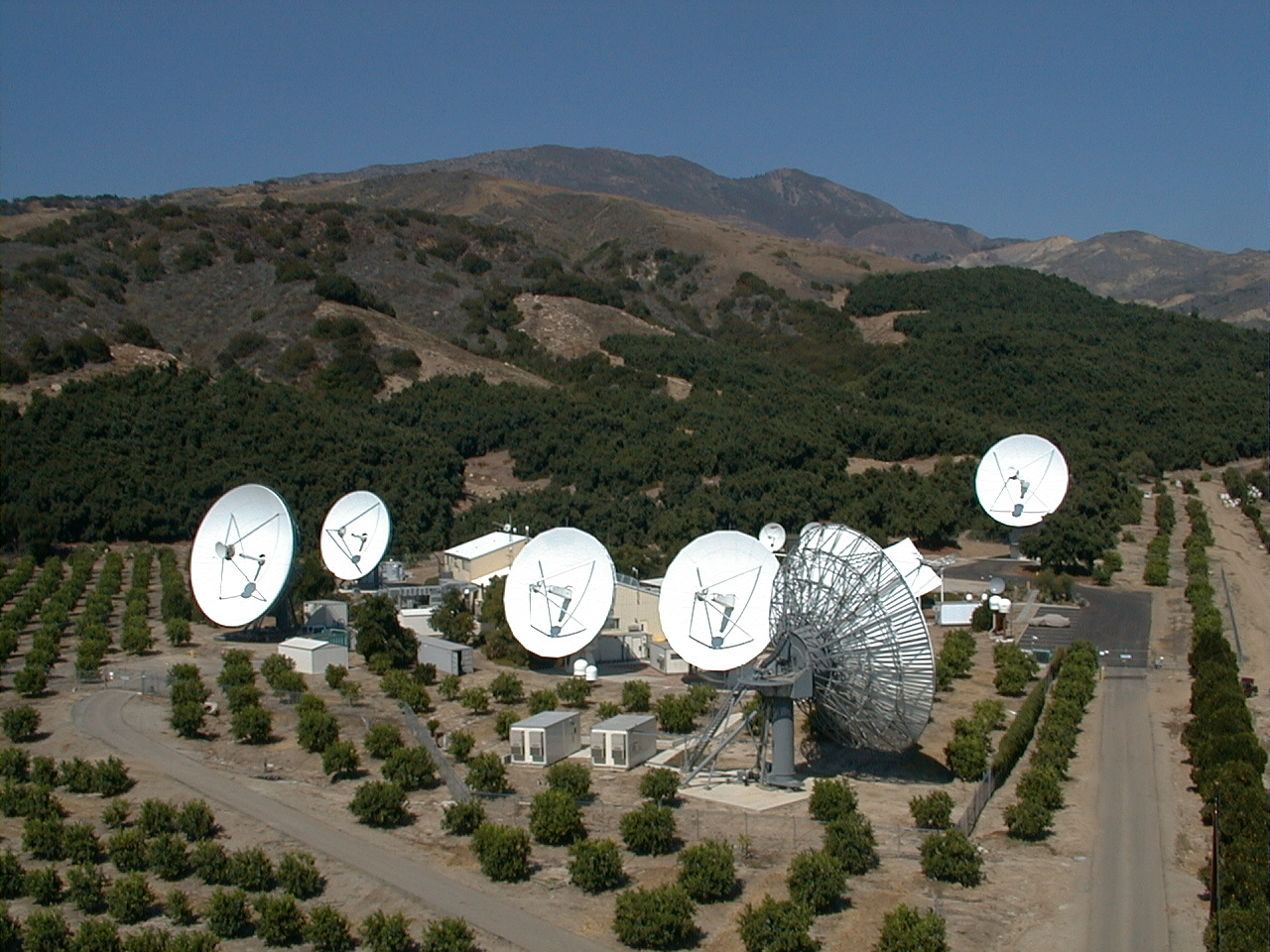
The Santa Paula, California Earth Station, designed by Briskman

Robert D. Briskman (born October 15, 1932) is Technical Executive of Sirius XM Radio.

He was the Chief Technical Officer and Executive Vice President, Engineering of Sirius Satellite Radio since its founding in 1991.

Briskman has been involved with communication satellite systems since their inception. Briskman, the technical innovator of mobile satellite radio services, was responsible for the development, implementation and operation of Sirius Satellite Radio's broadcast distribution system. His technology development responsibility included design of low cost satellite receiving terminals for automobiles and of broadcast sound programming, earth station, terrestrial repeaters and satellite control facilities.

During 2000, Briskman launched three Sirius satellites into a unique operational orbital constellation which he designed. The mobile subscriber radios use his patented space and time diversity technology.

In 2014, he became a member of the National Academy of Engineering for achievements in satellite communications, culminating in Sirius XM Radio.

== Early life and education ==
Briskman graduated from Poly Prep Country Day School in Brooklyn, New York in 1950. Briskman holds a B.S.E. degree from Princeton University and a M.S.E.E. degree from the University of Maryland which, in 2007, gave him its Technology Business Leadership Award.

== Career ==
=== Sirius XM Radio ===
Along with co-founder David Margolese, Briskman oversaw the development of the custom satellites, receivers and other technologies to bring satellite radio to consumers.

=== Geostar ===
Prior to Sirius XM Radio, Briskman was with the Geostar Corporation from 1986-1990. He was responsible at Geostar for the development, design, implementation and operation of the Radio Determination Satellite Service provided by Geostar, which allowed positioning and message communications between mobile users nationwide and their dispatch centers. Briskman directed the construction of Geostar's space segment, the control and operations center and the development of the mobile terminals used on land, sea and airborne vehicles built by the SONY, Hughes Network Systems and Kenwood Corporations. He was responsible for the development of a miniaturized handheld transceiver by Motorola, which was the world's smallest satellite earth terminal. Briskman served as Senior Vice President, Engineering.

=== COMSAT ===
Briskman was employed by the Communications Satellite Corporation (COMSAT) in January 1964, and was responsible initially for satellite command and control activities, including those involved with the launching of Intelsat I (Early Bird). He was later a Department Manager in the Transmission Systems Division, where he was involved with the development and implementation of the Intelsat global communications system. Among his efforts, early work in demand assigned single carrier per channel, radio frequency interference minimization and terrestrial interconnection was accomplished. Briskman was responsible from 1967-1973 for the technical planning involved with the provision of domestic communications services via satellites, including AT&T's satellite systems.

Briskman joined COMSAT General Corporation on its founding in 1973 and was Assistant Vice President, Space and Information Systems. He was responsible for the Comstar satellite system, the development of Earth resource and information systems, and the implementation of the first remote satellite data collection system in conjunction with the United States Geological Survey and Telesat Canada. He directed the construction of the Southbury and Santa Paula earth stations which were used for command and control of both Marisat and Comstar satellites and for shore communications to the Atlantic and Pacific Marisat satellites. Briskman joined Satellite Business Systems in mid-1977 where he was responsible for the Pre-Operational Program which provided voice and data communications services to many IBM facilities in the United States using the first demand-assigned, time division multiple access system ever placed in commercial operations.

Briskman returned to COMSAT General in 1980 where he was responsible as Vice President, Systems Implementation for the engineering of satellites, earth stations and communications technical facilities of COMSAT General and of clients, both within and external to COMSAT. His organization provided a complete range of technical services nationally and internationally, including those involved with software, spectrum engineering and teleconferencing. Briskman was responsible for Indonesia's domestic satellite system Palapa, Mexico's Morelos, Arabsat, and Italsat programs, as well as for providing support to the Inmarsat, Intelsat, STC (Direct broadcast), Telstar-3, Alascom, Satcol, Unisat, Intelmet, Nordsat, Chinasat, and Cameroon programs.

=== NASA ===
Prior to COMSAT, Briskman joined the National Aeronautics and Space Administration (NASA) during its founding in 1959. At NASA, Briskman was Chief of Program Support for the Office of Tracking and Data Acquisition. He was involved with the development of ground instrumentation for such projects as Apollo, Gemini, Ranger, Mariner, and Echo. Briskman received the Apollo Achievement Award from NASA for the design and implementation of the Unified S-Band System. Before NASA, he was employed by IBM in 1954 and worked on the design of the first asynchronous buffer system. After two years of military service as an Electronic Countermeasures Analyst Officer, for which he was awarded the Army Commendation Medal, Briskman was employed by the Army Security Agency. He was engaged in communications systems development and analysis.

=== Board memberships ===
Briskman is a Fellow and past Secretary-Treasurer, Vice President for Technical Activities and Director of the Institute of Electrical and Electronics Engineers (IEEE) which gave him the 2008 IEEE AESS Pioneer Award for communications satellite development. He has been president of the Aerospace and Electronics Systems Society, Director of the National Telecommunications Conference, Chairman of the EASCON Board of Directors, and Chairman of the IEEE Standards Board.

In 2008 Briskman joined the Board of Directors of GenMobi Technologies, a Silicon Valley company that developed anti-fraud applications including Check-Mates and Authidex.

Briskman has authored over fifty technical papers, holds many United States and foreign patents, served on the Industry Advisory Council to NASA, and is a licensed professional engineer. He is a Fellow of the AIAA, which gave him its 2007 Aerospace Communications Award, and the Washington Academy of Science, past President of the Washington Society of Engineers, and a member of IAA, AFCEA and the Old Crows. Briskman has been the Consulting Editor, Telecommunications for the McGraw-Hill Encyclopedia of Science & Technology over the past decade.

== Honors and awards ==
He is a recipient of the IEEE Centennial Medal and has been inducted into the Society of Satellite Professionals International (SSPI) Hall of Fame and into the Space Technology Hall of Fame by the Space Foundation. He was also elected a member of the National Academy of Engineering (2014).
