= Primosphere Limited Partnership =

Mass media company in the United States

Primosphere Limited Partnership was one of four companies bidding for Satellite Digital Audio Radio Service, or SDARS, licenses in the United States. The service would have been an advertisement-supported digital audio service with an emphasis on serving music genres that had lost exposure in the terrestrial radio market during that period, such as classic jazz, "beautiful music," "pop standards," and swing music. Two dedicated public radio talk channels were also proposed along with traditional talk radio channels.

== History ==
In 1990, Satellite CD Radio, Inc. proposed the concept of a satellite-delivered digital radio service to the Federal Communications Commission. The following year, New Jersey radio station WPAT switched formats on both its AM and FM stations from "beautiful music" to "adult contemporary", removing a high-fidelity FM radio outlet for these formats in the New York metropolitan area. In 1993, popular music radio station WNEW in New York changed format from pop standards and swing music to business talk radio WBBR-AM, and WQXR changed its call letters to WQEW and format to pop standards, in an unsuccessful attempt to capture the WNEW and WPAT listener diaspora.

In January 1995, the Federal Communications Commission (FCC) set aside 50 MHz (2310 MHz through 2360 MHz) in the S-band for Satellite Digital Audio Radio Service (SDARS), now commonly known as Satellite Radio. In 1996, WPAT-FM switched from music to Spanish language "adult contemporary" format. Its sister AM station WPAT switched to a Mexican music format, then to Korean language, and eventually paid ethnic programming. In the same year, Clifford Burnstein, a New York-based partner in entertainment industry company Q-Prime, and Peter Mensch bid $68 million for an SDARS license through holding company Primosphere Limited Partnership with the stated intention of restoring music genres no longer available in major radio markets.

In April 1997, American Mobile Satellite Corporation and Satellite CD Radio, Inc. were each awarded SDARS licenses. The companies eventually become known XM Satellite Radio and Sirius Satellite Radio, respectively. Primosphere and Digital Satellite Broadcasting Corporation were denied licenses as third and fourth lowest bidders, respectively, during the auction.

On October 27, 1997, the FCC formally dismissed Primosphere's and Digital Satellite Broadcasting Corporation's applications for an SDARS license. In November that year, Primosphere petitioned the FCC to adopt foreign ownership restrictions for SDARS licensees in order to overturn both Sirius Satellite Radio and XM Satellite Radio's licenses. XM at the time had a 20% stake owned by foreign-owned WorldSpace Satellite Radio.

In July 1999, American Mobile Satellite bought the 20% share of XM Satellite Radio owned by WorldSpace, effectively removing foreign ownership issues. In March 2001, Primosphere petitioned the United States Court of Appeals to require the FCC to review its previous petition, to require the FCC to adopt foreign ownership restrictions on SDARS licensees, now only Sirius Satellite Radio. XM Satellite Radio launched on September 25, 2001. In December 2001 the company petitioned the FCC to reconsider its 1997 decision to dismiss the company's SDARS application. The FCC reaffirmed its decision and sealed the company's fate. Sirius Satellite Radio officially launched on July 1, 2002, after several technical and financial delays.

On August 27, 2007, Primosphere filed a second comment concerning the merger of Sirius and XM Satellite Radio. In 2009 Sirius/XM was required to lease 8% or 4 channels each to qualified groups as a condition of their merger, potentially opening the door to Primophere leasing channels on XM and on Sirius existing radios for free to consumers, supported by commercials.
