= Broadcasting-satellite service =

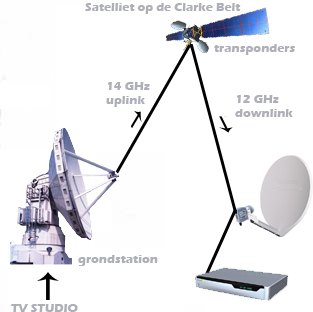
Broadcasting-satellite service, here working principle of TV-S broadcasting * earth station / feeder link (uplink) * space station * satellite dish, LNB, and receiver

Broadcasting-satellite service (short: BSS; also: broadcasting-satellite radiocommunication service ) is – according to Article 1.39 of the International Telecommunication Union's (ITU) Radio Regulations (RR) – defined as «A radiocommunication service in which signals transmitted or retransmitted by space stations are intended for direct reception by the general public. In the broadcasting-satellite service, the term “direct reception” shall encompass both individual reception and community reception.»

See also

== Classification ==
This radiocommunication service is classified in accordance with ITU Radio Regulations (article 1) as follows:
Broadcasting service (article 1.38)

- Broadcasting-satellite service (article 1.32)
Hardware broadcasting-satellite service

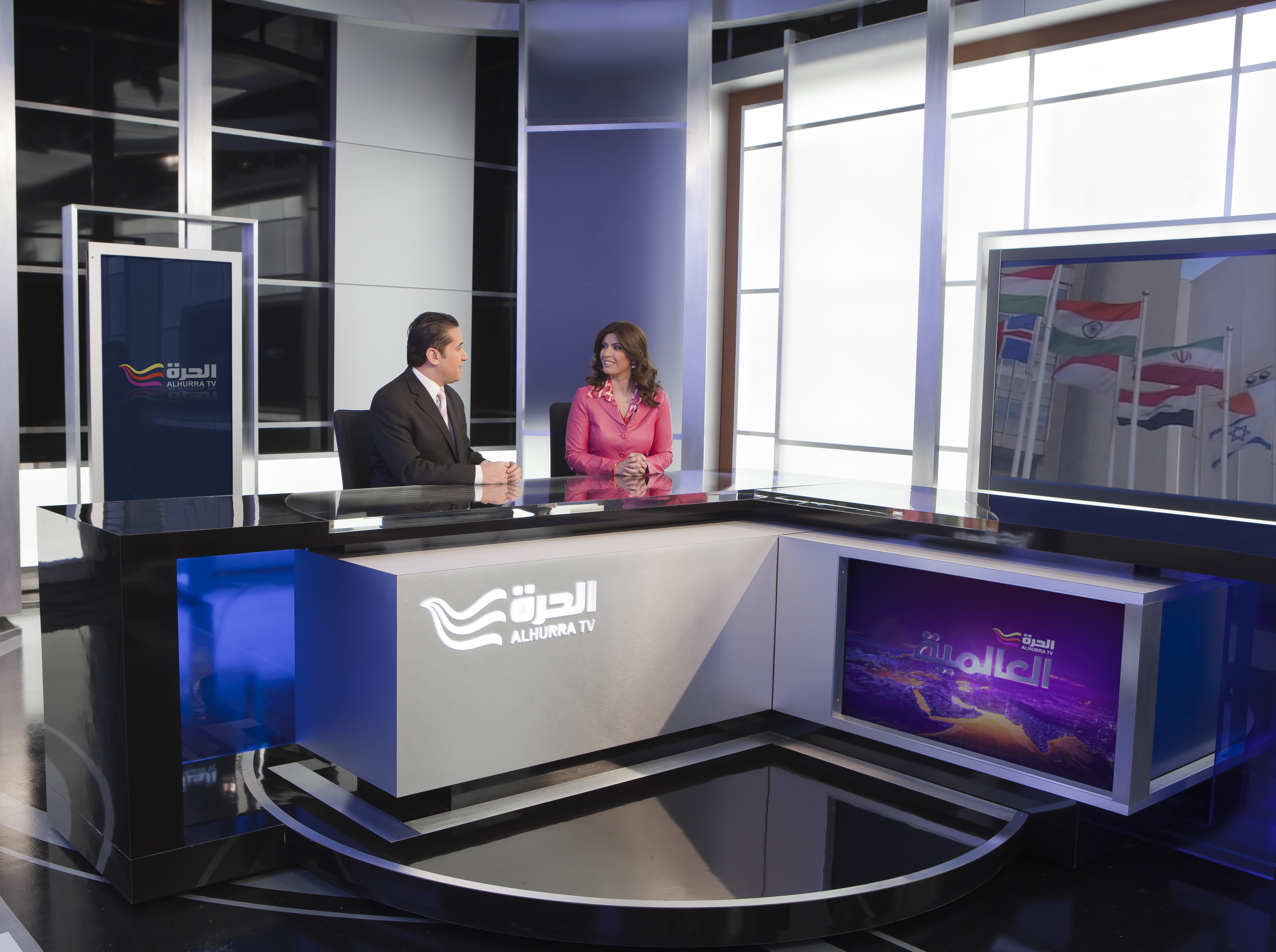
Broadcasting studio in Springfield, 2011

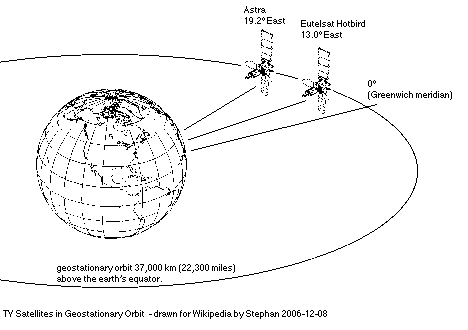
Broadcasting-satellites on geostationary orbit position

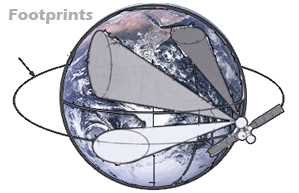
Broadcasting-satellite footprints

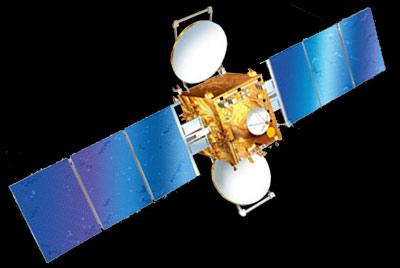
"INSAT 3E" broadcastin-satellite, solar panels fully extended

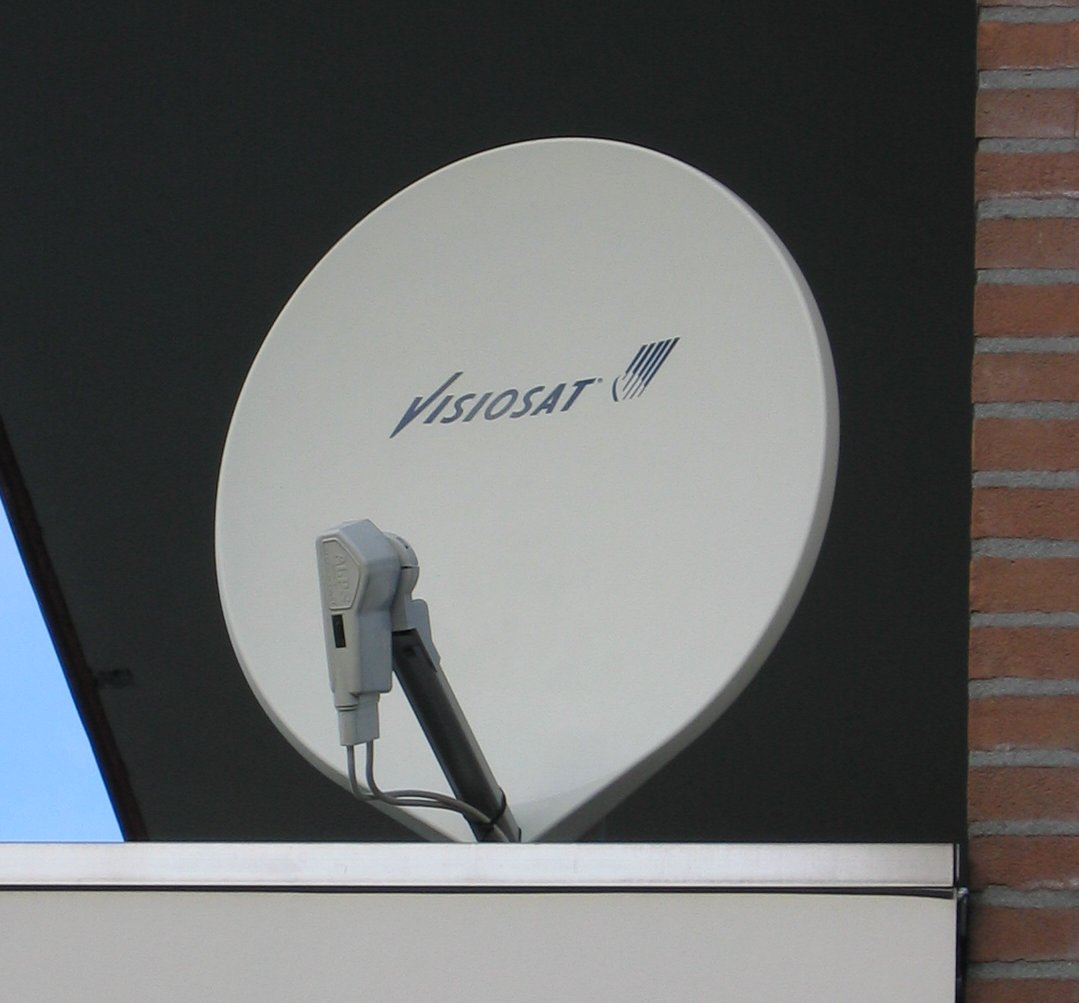
Offset satellite dish

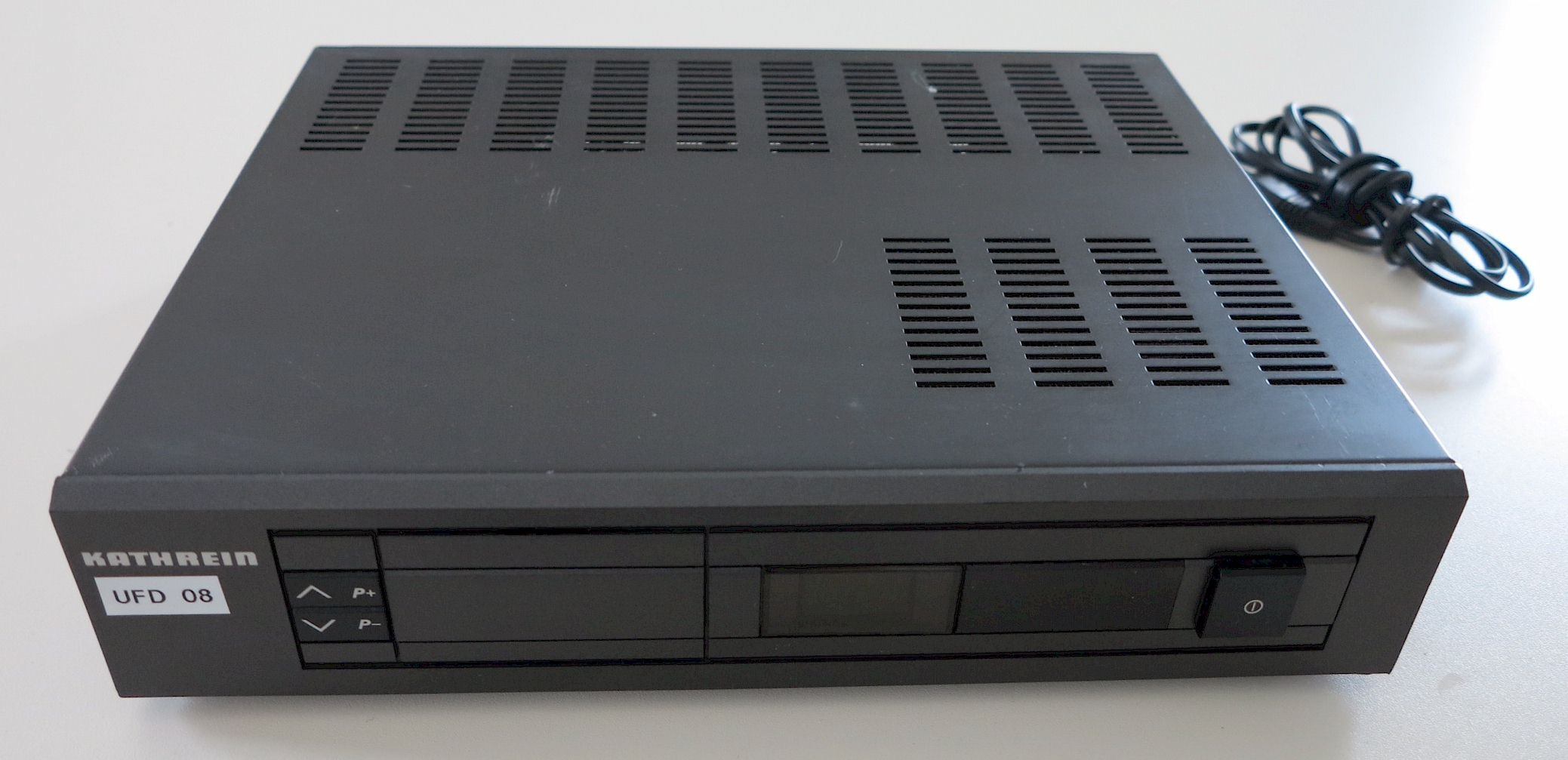
"Kathrein UFD 08" analogue satellite TV receiver, 1986

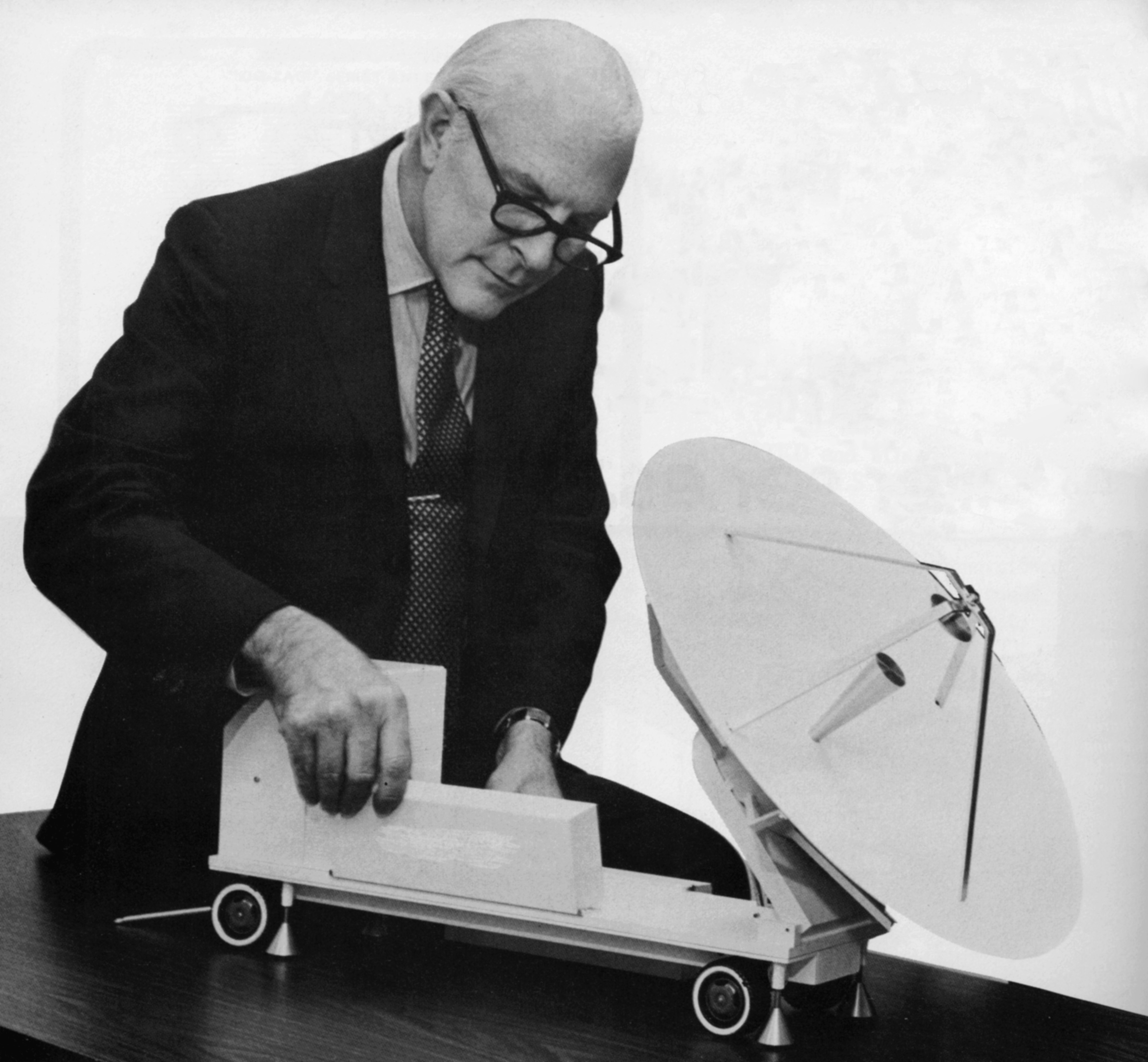
Earth station BSS

== Frequency allocation ==
The allocation of radio frequencies is provided according to Article 5 of the ITU Radio Regulations (edition 2012).

In order to improve harmonisation in spectrum utilisation, the majority of service-allocations stipulated in this document were incorporated in national Tables of Frequency Allocations and Utilisations which is with-in the responsibility of the appropriate national frequency administration.

Example of frequency allocation

Allocation to services
Region 1	Region 2	Region 3
1 452–1 492 MHz; FIXED; MOBILE except aeronautical mobile BROADCASTING; BROADCASTING-SATELLITE	1 452–1 492 FIXED; MOBILE; BROADCASTING; BROADCASTING-SATELLITE	
2 520–2 655; FIXED; MOBILE except aeronautical mobile BROADCASTING-SATELLITE	2 520–2 655; FIXED; FIXED-SATELLITE (space-to-Earth); MOBILE except aeronautical mobile BROADCASTING-SATELLITE	2 520–2 535; FIXED; FIXED-SATELLITE (space-to-Earth); MOBILE except aeronautical mobile BROADCASTING-SATELLITE
2 520–2 655; FIXED; MOBILE except aeronautical mobile BROADCASTING-SATELLITE	2 520–2 655; FIXED; FIXED-SATELLITE (space-to-Earth); MOBILE except aeronautical mobile BROADCASTING-SATELLITE	2 535–2 655; FIXED; MOBILE except aeronautical mobile BROADCASTING-SATELLITE
2 655–2 670; FIXED; MOBILE except aeronautical mobile BROADCASTING-SATELLITE; Earth exploration-satellite (passive); Radio astronomy Space research (passive)	2 655–2 670; FIXED; FIXED-SATELLITE (Earth-to-space/space-to-Earth); MOBILE except aeronautical mobile BROADCASTING-SATELLITE; Earth exploration-satellite (passive); Radio astronomy Space research (passive)	2 655–2 670; FIXED; FIXED-SATELLITE (Earth-to-space); MOBILE except aeronautical mobile BROADCASTING-SATELLITE; Earth exploration-satellite (passive); Radio astronomy Space research (passive)
11.7–12.5 GHz; FIXED; MOBILE except aeronautical mobile BROADCASTING; BROADCASTING-SATELLITE	12.2-12.7; FIXED; MOBILE except aeronautical mobile BROADCASTING; BROADCASTING-SATELLITE	11.7-12.2; FIXED; MOBILE except aeronautical mobile BROADCASTING; BROADCASTING-SATELLITE
		12.5-12.75; FIXED; FIXED-SATELLITE (space-to-Earth); MOBILE except aeronautical mobile BROADCASTING-SATELLITE
	17.3-17.7; BROADCASTING-SATELLITE and other services	
	17.7-17.8; BROADCASTING-SATELLITE and other services	
21.4-22; BROADCASTING-SATELLITE and other services		21.4-22; BROADCASTING-SATELLITE and other services
40.5-41 BROADCASTING-SATELLITE and other services
41–42.5 BROADCASTING-SATELLITE and other services

== See also ==
- Satellite radio
- Satellite television

== References / sources ==
- International Telecommunication Union (ITU)
