= Hugh Panero =

- Education: Clark University
- Occupation: Business executive
- Employer: XM Satellite Radio
- Known for: CEO of XM Satellite Radio (1998–2007)

Hugh Panero was the CEO of XM Satellite Radio from June 1998 to August 2007. He has been involved in the entertainment industry for over 16 years. From 1993 to 1998, he served as president and CEO of Request TV. He spent 10 years working for Time Warner Cable, partly spent as their vice president of marketing. Panero is also an alumnus of Clark University in Worcester, Massachusetts.
