= Puerto Rico Radio Broadcasters Association =

The Puerto Rico Radio Broadcasters Association is non-profit entity, registered with the Puerto Rico Department of State with most, but not all, radio broadcasters from the Commonwealth as members, that represents the industry's interests before the local government as well as the Federal government.

Puerto Rico is the United States jurisdiction with the highest density of radio stations issued per square mile, due in part to the high population density and the irregular topography that affects the range of AM and FM radio transmissions. Radio transmission began in Puerto Rico on December 3, 1922 when WKAQ-AM, reportedly the first radio station on the island, began broadcasts.

As an example of the Association's activities in furtherance of the industry's interests, it unsuccessfully opposed the introduction of Sirius radio satellite transmission services in Puerto Rico, which New York Puerto Rican-born congressman José Serrano and former Senate of Puerto Rico President and Secretary of State Kenneth McClintock had lobbied during the Sirius/XM Radio merger authorization process be extended to the Commonwealth.

The association is currently headed by Manuel Santiago Santos.
