= Talibabad Satellite Ground Station =

Second satellite ground station in Bangladesh

Talibabad Satellite Earth Station
- Location: Kaliakair Upazila, Gazipur District, Dhaka Division, Bangladesh
- Coordinates: 24°4′4.54″N 90°13′28.74″E
- Built: January 26, 1982; 44 years ago
- Location within Bangladesh

Talibabad Satellite Ground Station (Bengali: তালিবাবাদ ভূ-উপগ্ৰহ কেন্দ্র) is a communications satellite center in Bangladesh. It is the country's second ground station, located in Kaliakair Upazila of Gazipur District. The center was established in Talibabad on 26 January 1982. On 17 July 1999, the Government of Bangladesh allocated 231.685 acres of unused land of the center for the Kaliakair Hi-Tech Park, which reduced the area of the center. In terms of operational scope, Talibabad is considered a standard 'B' type center in Bangladesh.
