= David Margolese =

Canadian-born Israeli entrepreneur and philanthropist

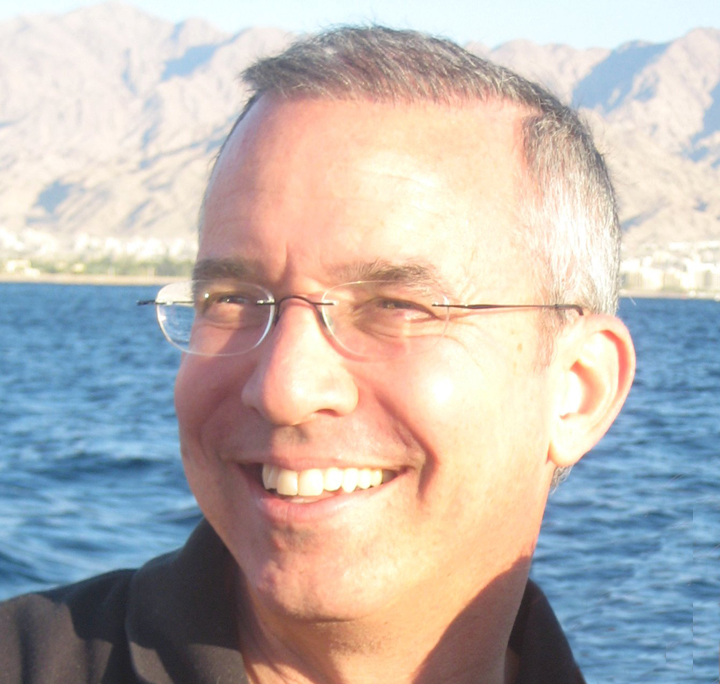
- Margolese on the Red Sea in 2012
- Born: October 24, 1957 (age 69); Vancouver, British Columbia, Canada
- Education: University of British Columbia (dropped out)
- Occupations: Co-founder, Chairman & CEO, SiriusXM; Co-founder, Rogers Wireless
- Years active: 1978–2003
- Spouse(s): Faranak Margolese (m. 2000; div. 2017) Michal Margolese (m. 2019)
- Children: 6

David Margolese (born October 24, 1957) is a Canadian-born Israeli businessman best known as the co-founder and former CEO of SiriusXM, the world's largest radio company. Considered "one of the earliest advocates of pay radio," he "effectively created the industry."

== Early life ==
Margolese was born and raised in Vancouver, Canada. He attended the University of British Columbia, dropping out after one year.

== Cellular ==
=== Rogers Wireless ===
Margolese is also the co-founder of Rogers Wireless, Canada's largest wireless company. In 1978, at the age of 20, Margolese founded Canadian Telecom, a radio paging company, which in 1980 partnered with Rogers Communications to create Rogers Wireless.

== Satellite radio ==
=== Sirius XM ===
In 1990, Margolese acquired control of CD Radio, a newly formed venture proposing a satellite radio service, becoming its chairman and CEO in 1993.

Margolese built the company with $1.8 billion he raised. He obtained the government license to operate the service, renamed the company Sirius Satellite Radio, developed and launched its satellites, developed its receivers, struck installation deals with automakers, and struck content deals with media companies. Margolese designed the company's studios and headquarters, and built them in Rockefeller Center in Manhattan.

In 2001, Margolese stepped down as CEO, remaining chairman for two more years, with Sirius issuing a statement thanking him "for his great vision, leadership and dedication in creating both Sirius and the satellite radio industry."

Sirius acquired XM in 2008, becoming SiriusXM, the world's largest radio company.

== Honors ==
Margolese was nominated by Harvard Business School as Entrepreneur of the Year in 1999. He was inducted into NASA's Space Technology Hall of Fame in 2002.

== Personal life ==
In 2002, Margolese moved to Israel, where he lives with his wife Michal and their six children.
