= Facebook Zero =

Initiative by Facebook

- Owner: Meta Platforms, Inc.
- Creator: Mark Zuckerberg
- Website: 0.facebook.com; zero.facebook.com; free.facebook.com; o.facebook.com; n.facebook.com
- Advertising: Yes
- Commercial: Yes
- Registration: Required

Facebook Zero is an initiative undertaken by social networking service company Facebook in collaboration with mobile phone-based Internet providers, whereby the providers waive data (bandwidth) charges (also known as zero-rate) for accessing Facebook on phones via a stripped-down text-only version of its mobile website (as opposed to the ordinary mobile website m.facebook.com that also loads pictures). The stripped-down version is available online only through providers who have entered the agreement with Facebook. Photos are not loaded by default. Users may still choose to view them by clicking through but regular data charges apply to photo use.

== History ==
Plans for Facebook Zero were first announced at the Mobile World Congress in February 2010 by Chamath Palihapitiya. In collaboration with 50 mobile operators around the world, it was officially of launched on May 18, 2010. The scheme is considered zero-rated or the practice of offering free data for some services, filtering out others.

The Facebook model featured a stripped-down version of the platform, which was made available to all mobile phone owners. It was offered in emerging markets to address the issue of data caps. A report explained that Facebook Zero subsidized phone data for a period, allowing for free user access. Facebook also provide technical assistance to partner carriers so that the process incurs low cost. In some countries, Facebook Zero is offered as part of a carrier's Free Basic data plan that could include access to Google and Wikipedia as well as localized content.

Facebook Zero became controversial in some countries due to several issues such as net neutrality. For instance, India's Telecom Regulatory Authority (TRAI) bans zero-rated services on account of "discriminatory tariffs for data services on the basis of content”. A criticism also stated that Facebook is practicing digital colonialism because it is not introducing open internet but building a "little web that turns the user into a mostly passive consumer of mostly western corporate content”.

Several carriers offer Facebook Zero:

- Albania: Telekom Albania; Vodafone Albania
- Algeria: Djezzy; Mobilis
- Angola: Unitel S.A.
- Bosnia and Herzegovina: ERONET
- Bangladesh: Grameenphone
- Benin: MTN Group
- Cameroon: MTN Group
- Canada: Freedom Mobile
- Croatia: Bonbon; Hrvatski Telekom; MultiPlus Mobile; Simpa; Tomato; Vipnet
- El Salvador: Movistar
- Fiji: Digicel
- France: SFR
- Germany: E-Plus Ortel
- Greece: WIND Hellas
- Georgia: MagtiCom
- Guinea: MTN Group
- Indonesia: XL Axiata
- Jordan: Zain Jordan
- Kenya: Airtel Kenya
- Kosovo: iPKO
- Malaysia: CelcomDigi
- Morocco: Maroc Telecom
- Nepal: Ncell
- Pakistan: Telenor Pakistan; Jazz Pakistan, Zong Pakistan
- Palestine: Jawwal
- Panama: Cable & Wireless Communications
- Philippines: Globe Telecom, Smart,
- Poland: Play
- Qatar: Vodafone Qatar
- Saudi Arabia: Saudi Telecom Company
- South Africa: CellC (Discontinued the service), Vodacom, MTN Group
- Suriname: Digicel
- Trinidad and Tobago: Digicel
- Turkey: Turkcell
- United Arab Emirates: Du
- United Kingdom: Three
- Zimbabwe: Telecel Zimbabwe
- Zambia: Airtel Zambia

== Reception and impact ==
An article by Christopher Mims in Quartz in September 2012 stated that Facebook Zero played a very important role in Facebook's expansion in Africa over the 18 months following the release of Facebook Zero, noting that data charges could be a significant component of mobile usage cost and the waiving of these charges reduced a significant disincentive for people in Africa to use Facebook.

Facebook Zero was also credited as the inspiration for a similar initiative undertaken by Wikipedia titled Wikipedia Zero.

Google Free Zone, a similar service launched by Google in November 2012, was viewed by Internet commentators as both inspired by and a potential challenge to Facebook Zero.

The Subsecretaría de Telecomunicaciones of Chile ruled that zero-rating services like Wikipedia Zero, Facebook Zero, and Google Free Zone, that subsidize mobile data usage, violate net neutrality laws and had to end the practise by June 1, 2014.

In 2015, researchers evaluating how Facebook Zero shapes information and communication technology use in the developing world found that 11% of Indonesians who said they used Facebook also said they did not use the Internet. 65% of Nigerians, 61% of Indonesians, and 58% of Indians agree with the statement that "Facebook is the Internet".

== See also ==
- Free Basics by Facebook
- Alliance for Affordable Internet
- Facebook for SIM
- Google Free Zone
- Twitter Zero
- Wikipedia Zero
