= Telephone numbers in Croatia =

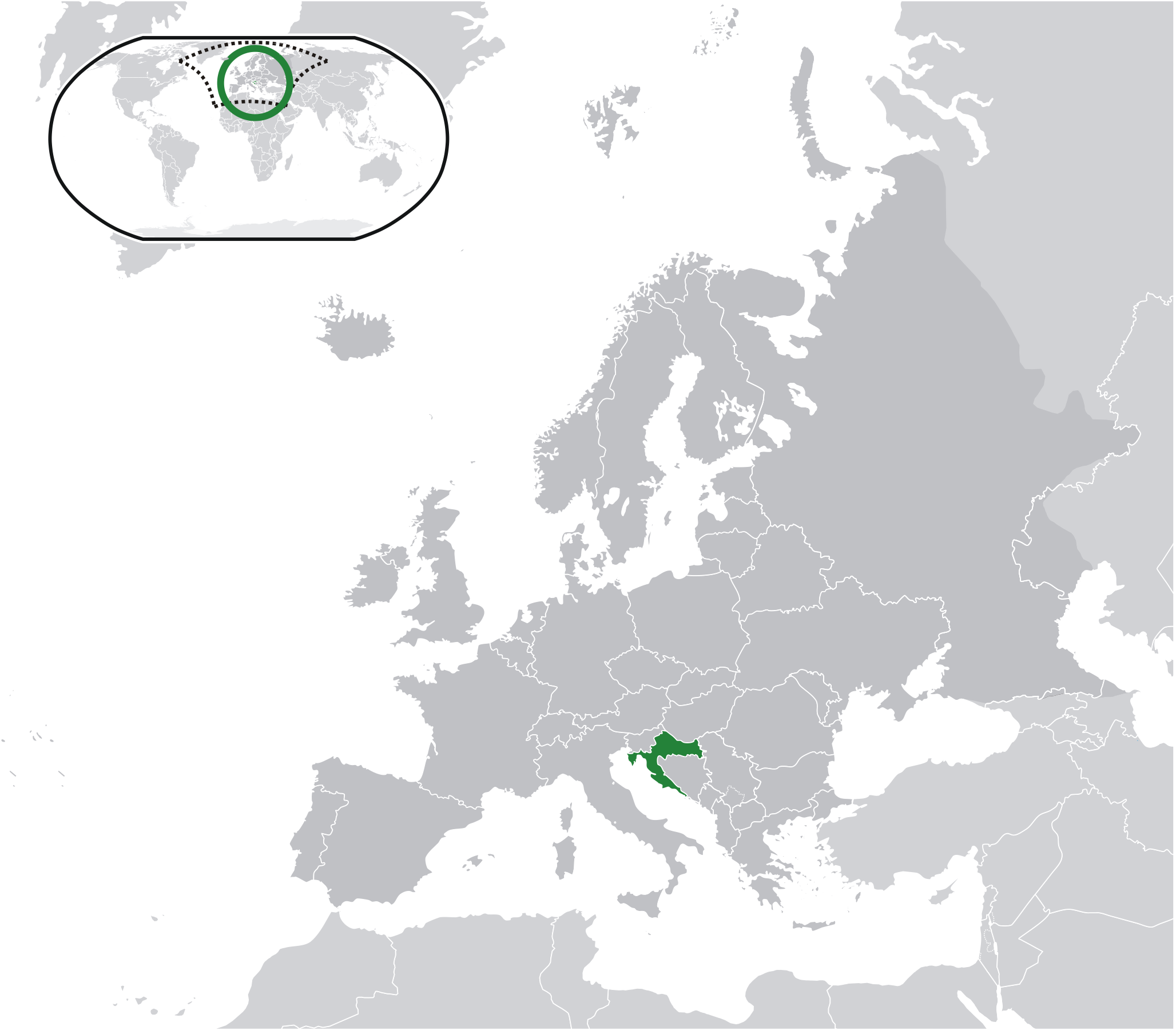
- Location of Croatia
- Country: Croatia
- Continent: Europe
- Regulator: HAKOM
- NSN length: 8 or 9
- Format: 0xx xxx xxx 09x xxxx xxx (mobile) (Note: Certain older phone numbers, land and mobile, may still contain fewer (8) digits but these are no longer issued.)
- Country code: +385
- International access: 00
- Long-distance: 0

This is an alphabetical list by town of phone dialing codes in Croatia. The country calling code for Croatia is +385. Croatia received this new country code following the breakup of the SFR Yugoslavia (+38) in 1991.

== Calling scheme ==
The international call prefix depends on the country of origin of the call, e.g. 00 from most European countries, and 011 from North America. For domestic calls (within the country), 0 must be dialed before the area code. The prefix for international calls from Croatia is 00 (e.g. for a United States number 00 1 xxx should be dialed).

An example for calling a line in Bjelovar-Bilogora County (area code 043) is as follows:

        xxx xxx    (within the 043 area)
   0 43 xxx xxx    (within Croatia)
+385 43 xxx xxx    (outside Croatia)

== List of area codes ==
Telephone area codes closely correspond to postal codes in Croatia and are assigned to counties. Both the Zagreb County and the City of Zagreb have the same area code (1), which is further divided into 9 areal subgroups (i.e. from 11 to 19, or 011 to 019 for calls from outside the region).

County	Code
Zagreb and Zagreb County	1 (11-19)
Dalmatia
Dubrovnik-Neretva	20
Split-Dalmatia	21
Šibenik-Knin	22
Zadar	23
Slavonia
Osijek-Baranja	31
Vukovar-Syrmia	32
Virovitica-Podravina	33
Požega-Slavonia	34
Brod-Posavina	35
Inland Croatia proper
Međimurje	40
Varaždin	42
Bjelovar-Bilogora	43
Sisak-Moslavina	44
Karlovac	47
Koprivnica-Križevci	48
Krapina-Zagorje	49
Littoral Croatia proper and Istria
Primorje-Gorski Kotar	51
Istria	52
Lika-Senj	53

== Mobile phone codes ==
Operator	Code(s)
Active
A1 (ex VIPnet)	91
Tomato (MVNO of A1, ex VIPnet)	92
Telemach Hrvatska (ex Tele2)	95
bonbon (MVNO of T-Hrvatski telekom)	976, 977
T-Hrvatski telekom	98, 99
Defunct
MultiPlus Mobile (MVNO of Konzum, switched off 1 April 2017)	979

Since the adoption of mobile number portability, prefixes of existing numbers no longer guarantee that a number is in the corresponding mobile network, i.e. carried by the mobile carrier that originally issued the number. Any newly issued number follows the above numbering plan.

== Value-added services ==
Service	Code
General content	60
Humanitarian	609
Televoting	61
Adult content	64
Prize games	65
Children content	69
Nationwide numbers	72 (was 62)
Personal numbers	74, 75
Internet dial-up	76, 77
Toll free	800, 801

== Emergency numbers ==
As mandated by law, all phones detectable by, or temporarily carried by, Croatian carriers provide unlimited access to state emergency numbers free of charge at all times. The Europe-wide 112 emergency number can be used to contact local fire and police departments and emergency medical and search and rescue services.

Service	Number
General emergency	112
Police	112 or 192
Fire brigade	112 or 193
Ambulance	112 or 194
MRCC Rijeka - SAR	112 or 195
Roadside assistance (HAK)	1987

== See also ==
- Communications in Croatia
- Postal codes in Croatia
- Telephone numbers in Yugoslavia
