= Othernet =

Global broadcast data company

Othernet Inc.
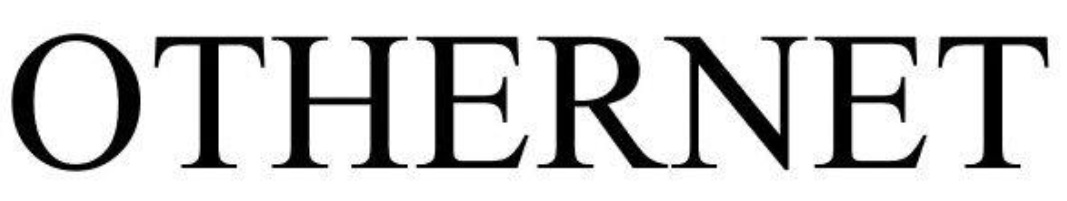
- Othernet Inc. company logo
- Formerly: Outernet Inc.
- Industry: Wireless communication; E-commerce
- Founded: 1 February 2014
- Founder: Syed Karim
- Defunct: 1 November 2025
- Headquarters: Chicago, United States
- Area served: Global
- Key people: Syed Karim, CEO
- Products: Radio receivers
- Services: Digital media; Internet

Othernet Inc. was a broadcast data company. Othernet sold several radio receivers and kits, as well as components including antennae, amplifiers, downconverters, and a radio frequency (RF) signal converter.

Othernet's stated goal was to build a worldwide library containing the core of human knowledge that would be accessible to everyone. It aimed to provide free access to content from the web through geostationary and low Earth orbit satellites. The project used datacasting to send signals to conventional geosynchronous communications satellites in a satellite constellation network. Wi-Fi enabled devices would communicate with ground station hotspots, which received data broadcasts from satellites.

It received its initial investment from the Media Development Investment Fund (MDIF), a United States–based impact investment fund and non-profit organisation. In 2015, Othernet also launched an IndieGogo campaign, which raised over US$637,000 to finance the development of the Lantern receiver. The company also received grants for technological development from the United Kingdom and for providing service to Ukraine.

The company and its service were previously known as Outernet Inc., but were changed in July 2018 due to trademark issues.

Othernet Inc. is listed as out of business as of 1 November 2025.

== Background ==
Compared to Worldspace radio, Othernet Inc. was an Information and Communication Technology for Development (ICT4D) program implemented with the intent of broadcasting to both a general audience as well as to specific sectors.

The project, conceived by MDIF's Director of Innovation Syed Karim, launched on 31 January 2014, with seed funding provided by MDIF subsidiary Digital News Ventures. Its initial team included a physicist, a space expert, a former FCC lawyer and a graphic designer. Karim had conceived the idea while pursuing a PhD at the University of Illinois Urbana-Champaign, beginning to work on it while employed at Chicago Public Media. Karim initially claimed that the projected annual cost would be US$15,000,000, and that the project would be possible with transponders already in orbit, able to broadcast 500 GB of new data daily.

Othernet was initially expected to provide limited offline Internet website access through a network of miniature satellites surrounding the globe to provide a password-free network accessible by anyone with a device able to connect to Wi-Fi. Backed by MDIF, the endeavor was projected to cost into the hundreds of millions to complete and was expected to be funded through voluntary donations, which were accepted through PayPal and via both Bitcoin and Dogecoin. Othernet claimed that all donations were tax deductible in their entirety.

The initial estimates expected to have prototypes completed by June 2015, launched using existing spacecraft. The prototype satellites were expected to number in the hundreds when the project was first announced. Othernet applied for time on the International Space Station for transmission testing, which they expected to be completed by September 2015.

The one-way signal was eventually expected to be able to support two-way communication, though a projected date was not mentioned. Transmitting on the Othernet signal was theoretically possible via the Automatic Packet Reporting System, however, the files sent over the signal sent by Othernet contained an XML declaration which identified the files the company had broadcast to the receivers.

=== Name change ===
Originally started under the name Outernet Inc., the company changed the name to Othernet Inc. in July 2018 following a trademark dispute, per a statement from Karim on the Othernet forums. The name "Outernet" had been trademarked for use by Consolidated Developments Ltd. in the United Kingdom.

== Goals ==
Othernet's purpose, as stated by Karim, was to compile a "core archive" of mankind's knowledge.

One of Othernet's stated priorities was to transmit educational content to areas without access, including both those in areas off-the-grid, as well as anyone living in an area with an oppressive government. Othernet expected to be able to offer the service free of charge and with full anonymity for users.

The service was also aimed at providing information available on the Internet in an offline format to individuals living in rural areas not covered by existing Internet service providers as well as in areas covered by ISPs but where access to those services was cost-prohibitive. Additionally, Othernet's broadcast would be able to bypass government-imposed censorship.

Karim also stated that Othernet intended to utilise existing technology as much as possible in order to reduce the potential equipment cost to users of the service.

== Transmission ==
=== Availability ===
In March 2014, Othernet stated that it would prioritise areas where inhabitants had no Internet access, citing the dense electronic presence in urban areas with access as a limiting factor to its implementation. They stated a preference for IEEE 802.11 for wireless transmission.

On 11 August 2014, Othernet began broadcasting to North America, Europe, the Middle East, and Northern Africa. Full beta became available for those locations on 1 October 2014, which allowed users to begin making content requests via Othernet's website.

Sub-Saharan Africa was able to access the broadcasts beginning in December 2014, where the service was used by schools in Kenya beginning 9 March 2015. A partnership with the World Bank Group in South Sudan scheduled a test of the service for July 2015 with Othernet expecting to be able to increase its coverage afterward. The deal reached was expected to help distribute Othernet's Pillar devices to increase access to educational materials available to local schools. In August 2015, Othernet stated that the Sub-Saharan region was receiving 800 Gbits (100 GB), the largest portion of the data broadcast.

Thane Richard, Othernet's COO through 2016, stated that broadcasts within Asia would begin by June 2015 with global distribution available by the end of 2016. By January 2016, broadcasts had been extended to cover Middle America; South America; Asia, including Russia; and Oceania. At that time, Othernet's broadcast could be received via Galaxy 19, Eutelsat 113 West A, Hot Bird, Intelsat 20, AsiaSat 5, and ABS-2.

Instead of being able to add L-band service to the existing K_{u}-band, Othernet discontinued the K_{u}-band in 2016 to begin broadcasting over L-band, though they had been able to broadcast over C band while active on K_{u}-band. L-band service was provided through three Inmarsat satellites: F1, covering the Asia-Pacific region; F3, covering the American continents; and F4 covering Europe, the Middle East, and Africa. The L-band service was discontinued in 2017 when Othernet returned to broadcasting on K_{u}-band, this time without reception requiring a satellite.

Ground stations were located in Toronto, Amsterdam, and Ketu Bay, New Zealand.

=== Signal ===
Othernet stated that it intended to use standards-based protocols such as DVB, Digital Radio Mondiale, and UDP-based Data Transfer Protocol in the satellites it intended to launch. According to Dr. Edward Birrane, the project would be using Delay/Disruption Tolerant Networking to bypass the issue of satellite transmission disruption due to any change in a satellite's position. The potential for such disruption led Othernet to request testing time on the International Space Station. Vice reported that Othernet expected a response to their request by June 2014. Birrane received a denial letter from the Center for the Advancement of Science in Space (CASIS) dated 16 April, the day after the article's publication. The refusal was attributed to funding.

Karim described the transmission as a mix of shortwave radio and BitTorrent. Othernet software developer Branko Vukelic compared the data transmission to dial-up modems operating around 30 KBps.

Initial transmissions were to consist of 1600 Mbits (200 MB) per day using the L-band, broadcast over Galaxy 19 and Hot Bird. However, when Othernet launched its Indiegogo campaign, it lowered the amount of data available to 16 Mbits (2 MB) per day, with the amount to be increased to 80 Mbits (10 MB) if the campaign reached US$500,000, with a data transmission cap listed at 800 Mbits (100 MB) per day. The broadcasts were also initially made on the K_{u}-band, with plans to add L-band, and once the CubeSats were launched, UHF. Othernet expected to have a constellation of 24 CubeSats launched prior to 2016. These satellites were expected to be launched into low Earth orbit at 500 kilometres (311 mi) altitude.

By March 2015, Othernet had filed with the U.S. Federal Communications Commission for a non-geostationary satellite orbit license, with Karim stating that their broadcast spectrum wouldn't interfere with existing satellite usage.

Using a Low-noise block downconverter (LNB) without an attached dish, Othernet sought to increase the download capabilities while reducing operational costs in 2018. They succeeded in transmitting a LoRa-modulated signal 71,572 kilometres (44,473 mi) via a K_{u}-band link to a geostationary satellite. The signal resulted in an increased download rate, from 2 kb/s to 30 kb/s.

=== Curation ===
The broadcast consisted of three datasets, none of which could contain hyperlinks to content that had not also been included.

The first, called the "Core Archive", consisted of materials selected by Othernet staff as essential. Karim likened the model to Flipboard. This portion of the broadcast was updated on a weekly basis, save for emergencies such as natural disasters.

Initial transmissions for the Core Archive included articles from Wikipedia; courses from Khan Academy and Teachers Without Borders; data from Open Source Ecology; international and local news; crop prices; Coursera; OpenStreetMap; Ubuntu; Bitcoin blockchains; the British Council's LearnEnglish; and emergency channels to replace cellular communication in the event of tower failure or natural disaster. In September 2014, ten articles from Harvard University's Digital Access to Scholarship at Harvard (DASH) were included in the broadcast. By November 2014, Project Gutenberg was also included. By June 2015, Elsevier and the U.S. HHS emPOWER Program were also included. The International Research & Exchanges Board (IREX) connected Othernet with libraries in Namibia to include local resources with the partnership expected to begin in 2016.

The second dataset was called the "Queue". Using the Google App Engine and coding in Python, Othernet created an API and web app to allow the content included in the transmissions to be suggested and voted on. Both SMS text messages and traditional postal mail were suggested as methods of requesting content to be added to the broadcasts, with plans to add WhatsApp. To be included in this dataset, the material had to be open licensed. In December 2015, Karim stated that remote areas largely requested healthcare and educational information.

Karim also admitted that once the project began transmission, Othernet expected to sell advertisements in order to pay for its costs. Othernet did include sponsored content in its broadcast, originally from World Bank and Radio Netherlands Worldwide, as well as UNICEF's Twitter feed. On 25 August 2014, Deutsche Welle announced a partnership with Othernet, citing their common goals of net neutrality and combating censorship. United Methodist Communications entered into an agreement with Othernet to broadcast the religious literature of the United Methodist Church in July 2015, which Richard stated he expected to be the beginning of Othernet's "faith-based content". This paid material comprised the third dataset.

Othernet opened a campaign on Fundable where they advertised three tiers for sponsored content broadcast via their signal: individual, a one-time payment for promotion of a specific piece of digital content; content creator, a recurring payment to broadcast content to anyone accessing Othernet's signal; and advertisers, whose ads would appear not only beside content broadcast via the signal but also within the Librarian user interface.

On occasion, Othernet representatives met in person with users to curate content for inclusion in the broadcast in their region. On 18–19 July 2015, Othernet partnered with Creative Commons for an edit-a-thon. It was scheduled for Mozilla Festival East Africa in Uganda, with remote participation from Nigeria and Guatemala. On 18 February 2016, Othernet held a training seminar organised by IREX and USAID at the America House cultural center in Kyiv to determine the most critical information in Ukraine.

=== Required hardware ===
The company contracted with creative agency Code and Theory to design the satellite dish component required to receive Othernet transmissions, which Karim stated was intended to provide a design that could serve as a blueprint and be improved and adapted by users of the service. They had previously used Crowdspring to request design specification ideas from the public.

The data from Othernet's broadcast was stored on receivers known as Pillars. The first three of these devices were installed in Kenya, the Dominican Republic, and an anarchist community in Detroit.

A second device produced by the company was expected to be able to be connected to a satellite dish to pick up the same signal, but also contained its own antenna to pick up a second signal Othernet intended to begin transmitting in the summer of 2015. These devices were called Lanterns and were solar-powered, with a battery life of 12 hours as a receiver and 4 hours as a Wi-Fi hotspot. The schematics for both the Pillars and the Lanterns were made available to the public to be able to create their own versions.

Unable to meet the announced release date for the Lantern devices, Othernet sold a version with less capabilities that they called the Lighthouse beginning on 16 July 2015. Othernet also sold do-it-yourself construction kits for the Lighthouse, priced between US$35 and US$135 depending on the materials included. The hardware itself was based on WeTek Play's receiver and had a 4 GB storage capacity. Richard noted that prior to the in-house development of the Lighthouse units, receivers had been do-it-yourself constructions on Raspberry Pi.

By November 2016, Othernet had released a DIY kit compatible with C.H.I.P., Raspberry Pi, and systems operating on Windows 7, Windows 10, or Linux.

=== Required software ===
The receiver originally used the ORxPi operating system, provided free of charge.

Othernet provided an interface called Librarian in order to access the information being broadcast. It could be accessed via any browser once a user connected to the receiver.

In September 2016, Othernet released a signal decoder for their transmission written in Linux and running in VirtualBox as a contained virtual machine that could be run on Windows called "Outernet-in-a-box".

In June 2017, Othernet's Skylark OS, previously included on C.H.I.P. hardware in their store, was made available for their Dreamcatcher hardware.

== Criticism ==
In Karim's first Reddit conversations discussing the project with the public, some doubted its viability, concerned about both the cost and the curation of content, as well as potential negative reactions from both governments and other corporations. One expressed concern was the potential restrictions on the launching of satellites to form the constellation for transmission, as the countries with the ability to launch satellites into orbit might have opposed Othernet, but the head of Mission Engineering, Aaron Rogers, explained that Othernet would be able to launch by piggybacking on already scheduled launches.

For example, in February 2014, Karim stated he had been talking to SpaceX regarding satellite launch and had been given a figure of US$57,000,000 for 13,000 kilograms (28,660 lb) of microsatellites. On 28 October 2014, Mishaal Ashemimry's MISHAAL Aerospace and Othernet signed a letter of intent to launch Othernet's constellation of CubeSats into low earth orbit once MISHAAL's orbital vehicle was operational.

One of the criticisms of the data once broadcasting through Othernet's curation had begun was that it was mostly in English, something TechCrunch pointed out could be a detriment in the developing nations the company claimed to be attempting to aid in being able to access data as they were less likely to be fluent. BuzzFeed News criticised what it referred to as "ad-hoc" inclusion in a one-way transmission as not being the best method of information distribution. Wired pointed out that allowing sponsored content was in direct opposition to the concept of net neutrality, adding to their concern of the content being decided by a U.S.-based company. This criticism of who provided the content being broadcast echoed earlier concerns from Discovery News that a sudden surge in data from Western Hemisphere nations could create deadly conditions for the very people Othernet proposed to aid with that same information.

Karim countered the arguments regarding curation methods by noting that all broadcasters choose what content to air and reminding critics that Othernet was not an ISP.

Additionally, Ovum's Mark Newman pointed out that literacy itself might be a barrier and recommended an audio broadcast while acknowledging that would require more bandwidth. Announcements within Othernet's first year, however, did state that they would include both audio and video files.

Jenna Burrell of the UC Berkeley School of Information noted that users might also have technological literacy issues as well as simply obtaining devices with Wi-Fi connections to be able to download data from the Pillars. For example, both Raspberry Pi and ICT Works, in 2015 reviews of the hardware, commented on the difficulty in properly aiming a satellite dish to receive the signal. Dr. Yuen Kin-sun of The Open University of Hong Kong, however, saw the potential for philanthropic groups to use Othernet in their efforts.

Potential opposition from telecom corporations brought scepticism from participants in Karim's Reddit Q&A, to which he responded by stating that Othernet was prepared and expected to win any clash with those companies. He also stated that all of Othernet's plans had been proven by experiments conducted by other companies, showing that all of their desired outcomes were technically possible.

El Nuevo Herald published a column stating that the benefits of a free Internet being debated because of the efforts of Othernet and other such initiatives would certainly be opposed by telecoms, but that the true difficulty with such projects lay in the commercial factor, because their intentions would be compromised by their desire for economic gain.

With respect to the Lantern, USA Today praised Othernet for including the solar panels to make certain the emergency information was available in the event of an access outage, adding that developing countries would benefit from the inclusion of a screen to be able to access the content being transmitted.

The proposed CubeSat constellation itself was another concern, as the devices are expected to have deteriorating orbits due to their lack of propulsion; Othernet didn't explain how it planned to replenish the fleet as the life cycle of the CubeSats ended. Karim acknowledged the technological limitation but other than expressing a hope that new developments would extend the life of CubeSats to a full year, he did not address it.

The projected timeline was also criticised for its reliance on the cooperation of outside entities; testing on the International Space Station, for example, required security assessments from NASA that could take years, yet Othernet initially claimed they expected to be able to begin their microsatellite evaluation on the ISS by September 2014.

At the 2016 Chaos Computer Club conference in Hamburg, Daniel Estévez pointed out that Outernet had left the HTTP port open on their satellite modem which allowed for anyone to be able to access the login page. Othernet was also criticised for stating that the broadcast contained 20 MB per day when examining the data stream showed only 15.14 MB.

== Revenue ==
Despite critiques, Othernet raised almost US$400,000 in the first week of their Indiegogo campaign, reaching US$686,000 as of August 2015. The campaign was specifically intended to provide a product aimed at U.S. consumers.

The company was also awarded a US$1,500,000 grant through the International Partnership Space Programme of the UK Space Agency. The deal allowed Othernet to have CubeSats made through Clyde Space for only US$50,000, which were expected to be completed by 2016. These satellites were to be dedicated to the signal sent specifically to the Lantern devices.

Othernet also received a grant of US$20,000 in order to broadcast their educational resources to Ukraine. All Children Reading, a cooperative of USAID, World Vision, and the Australian government, supplied the grant.

Othernet applied for Trade Adjustment Assistance from the U.S. Economic Development Administration in November 2019.

In 2021, BusinessCom Networks defined the Othernet business model as a series of managed private networks for sale when announcing their role as a transmission facilitator covering Europe on Eutelsat 8 West B.

=== Hardware sales ===
In addition to the Lantern sold through Indiegogo, Othernet produced other hardware that it marketed through its online store.

As changes to the service were implemented, hardware that had worked for previous iterations became obsolete, prompting Othernet to sell their stock of those units on eBay when they could be utilised for other purposes.

In May 2016, Othernet produced a prototype L-band downconverter which would allow better reception using RTL-SDR equipment on signals over 1.5 GHz. Commercial production of the product, however, was abandoned as being too expensive. In August 2016, they began selling the E4000 dongle, an L-band satellite patch antenna, and an L-band low-noise amplifier (LNA), separately and in bundles.

A do-it-yourself receiver kit sold in 2017 included a board, a patch antenna, and a C.H.I.P. computer, but no mounting apparatus for the antenna. A deluxe kit sold through Shopify beginning in April 2017 was called the SDRx and included the antenna, an E4000 SDR dongle, the Inmarsat LNA, C.H.I.P., and a backup battery. Othernet announced in August 2017 that the SDRx would be replaced by the Dreamcatcher, an L-band LNA and filter combined with an Allwinner A13 processor, 512 MB RAM, and an RTL-SDR that was capable of running on both Armbian and Othernet's Skylark software.

The company began crowdfunding on Crowd Supply for the release of an RF signal converter named moRFeus scheduled to begin shipping on 15 April 2018. It was programmable via a computer using Windows or Linux, and could function in temperatures varying from −40 °C (−40 °F) to 85 °C (185 °F). It had been in development since summer 2017.

In 2018, Othernet's engineering team partnered with the RTL-SDR project to develop and market the KerberosSDR as a low-cost device with direction finding and passive radar functions. The device was sold directly through the Othernet store beginning 2 September 2019. They collaborated on another product in 2019, releasing a dedicated patch antenna kit for L-band reception, this time through the RTL-SDR.com website.

In 2020, Othernet released the Bullseye 10 kHz LNB to receive signals broadcast through Es'hail 2.

== Impact ==
In August 2014, Presidential Early Career Award for Scientists and Engineers nominee Siddharth Rajhans acknowledged his project, Spacify Inc, had been based on the Othernet concept, but with a focus only on India.

On 27 October 2015, Othernet was one of ten companies awarded the "Up-and-Comer" award at the 14th Chicago Innovation Awards.

Keepod, a company providing USBs containing an Android operating system as well as storage capacity, partnered with Othernet to be able to provide content to schools and in refugee camps without concern for Internet connectivity, starting with the island of Mindoro.

Eric Williams of MkMe Lab created an inexpensive portable electronic classroom called EduCase as a 2016 Hackaday Prize entry which relied on the Othernet broadcast to provide educational materials with the goal of increasing available STEM content in the classrooms of developing nations.

In July 2016, EDIMPACT CEO Sanwill Srivastava announced that he was awaiting official clearance from governmental authorities to implement Othernet technology in spreading their educational programs beyond the pilot launches in Bihar and Jharkhand.

On 5 December 2016, the Society of Satellite Professionals International recognised Othernet as a "disruptive innovator" for its data broadcasts at the second Better Satellite World Awards.

In 2017, Othernet partnered with DataZetu of Tanzania to develop MeshNews, a project to broadcast the news into rural African communities, which received a grant from innovateAfrica.

At the Institute of Electrical and Electronics Engineers April 2018 conference in Chennai, staff of Amrita University recommended implementing Othernet in the public schools of India, projecting a savings of ₹374.2419 if used in the 87,033 schools receiving government funding for five consecutive years.

=== Project Empathy ===
On 1 February 2016, Othernet launched Project Empathy in Chicago as an effort to not only provide students in schools without Internet access educational resources, but also to teach students in classrooms with Internet access about information curation. GEMS World Academy-Chicago partnered with Othernet for the pilot program, meeting weekly to build the receivers and download information to them. At the end of February 2016, the project was open to any school wanting to purchase one of the kits.

== Disestablishment ==
Karim announced on the Othernet forums that the transmission would end by 31 December 2024.

Othernet Inc. is listed as out of business as of 1 November 2025.

== See also ==
- A Human Right
- Internet
- Internet-in-a-Box
- Internet.org
- Iridium Burst
- O3b
- OneWeb
- Project Loon
- Toosheh
- Wikipedia Zero
- World Possible

== Sources ==
- "22 watchdog' projects in Africa win funding". Bizcommunity.com. 3 February 2017. NewsBank 1625568BD82EB068.
- "A 3D Printed Case for the DIY Outernet Kit". RTL-SDR.com. 9 May 2017. Archived from the original on 11 May 2017.
- "Bộ ăng ten bảng tích cực băng tần L" [Active L-Band Patch Antenna Kit]. t17lab.com (in Vietnamese). 5 November 2019. Archived from the original on 18 November 2019.
- "Better Satellite World Award Honorees Brought To Light By SSPI". SatNews. 19 November 2016. Archived from the original on 27 March 2026.
- 「地球を無料のWiFi網で覆い尽くす」!! 世界に革命を起こす「アウターネット」構想とは!? ["Blanketing the Earth in a Free Wi-Fi Network"!! What Is the "Outernet" Concept Set to Revolutionize the World!?]. Tocana (in Japanese). 22 February 2014. Archived from the original on 26 April 2017.
- "Channel launched". sat-address.com. 11 August 2014.
- "Chicago Innovation Awards Announces Its 2015 Winners". Telecommunications Weekly. NewsRx. 11 November 2015. p. 74. Gale A433987504.
- "CubeSats to provide telecomms through international partnership". Gov.uk (Press release). 13 March 2015. Archived from the original on 14 March 2015.
- "Deutsche Welle: Making News Available Worldwide Via Outernet". ModernGhana (Press release). 25 August 2014. Archived from the original on 22 March 2026.
- "Facebook Picks Up the Pace in Race to Beam Internet From Above". NBC News. 5 March 2014. Archived from the original on 8 October 2017.
- "Free 'net that's right out there". Sunshine Coast Daily. 7 February 2014. p. A2. NewsBank 14BCFAF592CC9F40.
- "Harvard's Open-Access Repository Is Going Where No Repository Has Gone Before". Harvard Library (Press release). n.d. Archived from the original on 18 October 2014.
- "Indore techie's Spacify Inc in Presidential Early Career Award for Scientists and Engineers race". The Times of India. 17 August 2014. NewsBank 1565566B970E9A68. Archived from the original on 6 July 2015.
- "Innovating the ICT4D Device That Can Give Education and Advice to the Illiterate and Information to the Unconnected". allAfrica. 1 June 2015. NewsBank 1562BD3B2082F7B0.
- "KerberosSDR Batch 2 Ships Soon! Pricing will Rise on Monday". RTL-SDR.com (Press release). 30 August 2019. Archived from the original on 20 September 2019.
- "New Outernet Products For Sale: E4000 RTL-SDR, L-Band Patch Antenna, L-Band LNA". RTL-SDR.com. 12 August 2016. Archived from the original on 15 August 2016.
- "News Update: Thane Richard joins Times Bridge as Head of Content Strategy". Best Media Info (Press release). 14 June 2017. NewsBank 1650A4BCDFA8E778.
- "Nigun (Melody): Open Hardware Plans for an RTL-SDR Downconverter". RTL-SDR.com. 4 January 2017. Archived from the original on 27 October 2022.
- "Notice of Petitions by Firms for Determination of Eligibility To Apply for Trade Adjustment Assistance" (PDF). Federal Register. 25 November 2019. 84 FR 64829. Archived (PDF) from the original on 18 October 2020.
- "The Othernet Bullseye TCXO LNB for QO-100 Reception". RTL-SDR.com. 10 March 2020. Archived from the original on 14 April 2020.
- "Othernet Inc". Dun & Bradstreet. n.d.
- "Othernet Overview". Pitchbook. n.d.
- Othernet Trademark, 17 June 2025, U.S. Trademark 86,711,270
- "Outernet: Providing information to the world from outer space". Media Development Investment Fund (Press release). 3 February 2014.
- "Outernet 3.0 Coming Soon: Free 30kbps – 100kbps satellite data downlink for news, weather, audio etc". RTL-SDR.com. 27 December 2017.
- "The Outernet Dreamcatcher: A Linux Based ARM PC with Built in RTL-SDR". RTL-SDR.com. 8 June 2017. Archived from the original on 10 June 2017.
- "Outernet Inc. Signs a Letter of Intent with MISHAAL Aerospace for Launch of their Satellites". MISHAAL Aerospace (Press release). 28 October 2014. Archived from the original on 3 March 2015.
- "Outernet, la red WiFi global gratuita con selección de contenidos de internet" [Outernet: The free global Wi-Fi network with a curated selection of internet content.]. ElDiario.es (Interview) (in Spanish). Interviewed by Sergio Figueroa. 3 April 2014. Archived from the original on 21 July 2024.
- "Outernet Launches Sales for Wideband Frequency Converter, Signal Generator". Microwave Journal. 27 March 2018. Archived from the original on 13 February 2025.
- "Outernet… New Hope For The World…Free Internet Access For Earthlings Awaits Funding". SatNews. 17 February 2014. Archived from the original on 27 March 2026.
- Outernet Trademark, 1 January 2018, U.S. Trademark 86,466,406
- Outernet Trademark for Consolidated Developments Limited, 13 February 2024, U.S. Trademark 88,567,959
- UK Trademark No UK00003074026, 16 January 2015, UK Trademark UK00003074026
- Тренінг "Аутернет" в Американському домі ["Outernet" training at the America House]. Media Literacy (in Ukrainian). 3 February 2016. Archived from the original on 8 February 2019.
- "Outernet Updates: Denied by NASA". Outernet. October 2014. Archived from the original on 24 October 2014.
- "Outernet's Old Antenna Stock for Sale: L-Band Active and Filtered Ceramic Patch Antennas". RTL-SDR.com. 17 May 2018. Archived from the original on 20 July 2019.
- "Thu tín hiệu Outernet với phần cứng SDRx" [Receiving Outernet signals with SDRx hardware]. t17lab.com (in Vietnamese). 8 October 2017. Archived from the original on 24 March 2019.
- "Nghiên cứu SDR sử dụng bộ thu vệ tinh Outernet" [SDR Research Using the Outernet Satellite Receiver]. t17lab.com (in Vietnamese). 14 May 2017. Archived from the original on 24 March 2019.
- "Seventh-Graders To Explore Service Through Technology". GEMS World Academy-Chicago (Press release). 26 January 2016. Archived from the original on 13 February 2016.
- "Skylark Image for Outernet's Dreamcatcher RTL-SDR". RTL-SDR.com. 30 June 2017. Archived from the original on 4 July 2017.
- "Testing a Prototype of the Outernet L-Band Downconverter". RTL-SDR.com. 26 May 2016. Archived from the original on 28 May 2016.
- "Testing the Outernet-In-A-Box Virtual Machine Decoder for Windows & Linux". RTL-SDR.com. 27 September 2016. Archived from the original on 30 September 2016.
- "United Kingdom Intellectual Property Office Publishes Application for the Trademark "OUTERNET" to Consolidated Developments for Multiple Products and Services". UK Government News. 20 September 2011. NewsBank 139E6E07902A1F60.
- "United Methodist Communications Steps Up as First Faith-Based Organization for Innovative Global 'Public Library' Project". ICT Monitor Worldwide (Press release). 16 July 2015. NewsBank 1569EB763512BF08.
- ป๋าเอก (n.d.). IT: เปิดตัว Outernet อินเทอร์เน็ต WiFi จากนอกโลกที่ทุกคนสามารถใช้งานได้ฟรี! [IT: Introducing Outernet—WiFi from outer space that everyone can use for free!]. techxcite (in Thai). Archived from the original on 8 February 2014.
- Alsnia, Guillame (25 January 2019). "Conversor de frecuencia de banda ancha" [Broadband frequency converter]. comunicacionesinalambricashoy.com (in Spanish). Archived from the original on 24 September 2019.
- Alviar, Vaughn (5 January 2016). "Education in a flash". Philippine Daily Inquirer. NewsBank 15A2F0EF490DD730. Archived from the original on 6 January 2016.
- Aramayo, Pablo H. (6 April 2014). "Inevitable corrupción de lo gratuito" [The Inevitable Corruption of the Free]. El Nuevo Herald (in Spanish). p. 23A. NewsBank 14D05C40B531B0E8.
- Aufranc, Jean-Luc (6 January 2016). "Outernet Shares Knowledge via their Lighthouse Satellite Receiver". CNX Software – Embedded Systems News. Archived from the original on 18 January 2016.
- Aufranc, Jean-Luc (3 November 2016). "Outernet Introduces Standalone & DIY Internet Satellite Kits for C.H.I.P Board, Raspberry Pi 3 Board, and Laptops". CNX Software – Embedded Systems News. Archived from the original on 5 November 2016.
- Benchoff, Brian (24 May 2016). "Hackaday Prize Entry: Worldwide Educational Infrastructure". Hackaday. Archived from the original on 26 May 2016.
- Brown, Alex (20 February 2014). "Coming Soon: Free Internet From Space". The Atlantic. Archived from the original on 16 July 2019.
- Bruninga, Bob (n.d.). "OUTNET, a Global APRS Ham Radio Emergency Comms Satellite Net". APRS.org. Archived from the original on 9 October 2016.
- Carter, Jamie (4 April 2016). "Off-grid education gives regions without internet access to content and learning tools". South China Morning Post. Archived from the original on 13 April 2016.
- Chhabra, Esha (1 July 2015) [31 December 2014]. "Outernet: Beaming Information To The World's Four Billion Who Are Offline". Forbes. Archived from the original on 6 January 2015.
- Coldewey, Devin (13 March 2015). "UK Space Agency Boosts Cubesat Space Internet Plan". NBC News. Archived from the original on 14 March 2015.
- Costa, Camilla (14 October 2014). "Outernet aims to provide data to the net unconnected". BBC Brasil. Archived from the original on 15 October 2014.
- Danigelis, Alyssa (25 February 2014). "'Othernet' Project Seeks Free Internet Access For Earth". Discovery News. Archived from the original on 1 November 2015.
- de Souza, Ramon (17 November 2014). "Outernet: conheça a "internet" gratuita e acessível ao mundo inteiro" [Outernet: Discover the Free "Internet" Accessible to the Entire World]. Tecmundo (in Brazilian Portuguese). Archived from the original on 28 November 2015.
- Edwards, Luke (12 January 2015). "Never pay for data on the Outernet thanks to the solar Lantern's satellite Wi-Fi hotspot". Pocket Lint. Archived from the original on 24 August 2019.
- Estévez, Daniel (27 December 2016). 33C3: Reverse engineering Outernet (Video). Hamburg: Chaos Computer Club – via Internet Archive.
- Faed, Malcolm (21 April 2017). Othernet - Malcolm Faed - Manly-Warringah Radio Society lecture (Video). Sydney: Manly-Warringah Radio Society, VK2MB-TV. Event occurs at 2:03–2:57 – via YouTube.
- Fernandes, Nigel (19 July 2016). "With Revolutionary Technologies Edimpact to Proliferate Education & Digital Literacy". World Press Release (Press release). Archived from the original on 29 March 2026.
- Finley, Kurt (27 July 2015). "The Plan to Beam the Web to 3 Billion Unconnected Humans". Wired. Archived from the original on 28 July 2015.
- Franklin-Wallis, Oliver (31 December 2015). "How Outernet is bringing free internet to the world's poor". Wired.
- Gandhiraj, R.; Vinutna, T.; Sai Bharath, K.B.; Venu Sri, S.K.; Soman, P.K. (April 2018). A Digital Library at Zero Cost Through a Satellite. 2018 International Conference on Communication and Signal Processing (ICCSP). Chennai, India: Institute of Electrical and Electronics Engineers. pp. 1094–1099. Bibcode:2018sgpc.conf..142G. doi:10.1109/ICCSP.2018.8524258.
- Gannon, Patrick (8 April 2021). "Othernet and International Datacasting". BusinessCom Networks (Press release). Archived from the original on 24 January 2026.
- Gilster, Paul (17 March 2014). "Look up for latest in Net access". The News & Observer. p. 3D. NewsBank 14CB0BD2B6375178.
- Graham, Meg (15 December 2014). "Outernet would provide offline access to web content via radio waves". Chicago Tribune. Archived from the original on 27 March 2026.
- Grothaus, Michael (13 March 2014). "All About Google Loon's Low-Cost Space-Based Competitor, Outernet". Fast Company. Archived from the original on 5 June 2021.
- Halfacree, Gareth (20 February 2018). "Outernet Claims 71,572km LoRa World Record". AB Open. Archived from the original on 26 August 2019.
- Henry, Caleb (4 November 2014). "Outernet Signs Letter of Intent to use Mishaal Aerospace's M-OV Launch Vehicle". Satellite Today. Gale A388969465. Archived from the original on 24 March 2026.
- Hobey, Erin (18 June 2015). "Brief: Outernet Exceeded $637K in Indiegogo Pre-orders; Partners with Fundable for Next Fundraise". Crowdfund Insider. Archived from the original on 18 June 2015.
- Honess, David (19 June 2015). "Outernet". Raspberry Pi. Archived from the original on 5 December 2021.
- Horsey, Julian (12 April 2018). "moRFeus Configurable Wideband Frequency Converter Hits Crowd Supply". Geeky Gadgets. Archived from the original on 18 July 2019.
- Hustad, Karis (9 September 2015) [17 August 2015]. "Outernet Will Deploy Its Satellite Data Solution To Conflict Zones In Ukraine". Chicago Business Journal.
- Jackson, Tom (1 December 2014). "All the tech news you shouldn't miss from November in Africa". The Next Web. NewsBank 151F675156F044C
- Karim, Syed (6 July 2018). "Typo or Name change? OTHER-net?". Othernet forums. Archived from the original on 16 January 2025.
- Karim, Syed (24 July 2024). "Is Othernet officially now dead?". Othernet forums. Archived from the original on 15 January 2025.
- Kelly, Spencer (31 March 2015). "How the Outernet is connecting schools in Kenya". Click. BBC News.
- Krishnakumar, Priya (8 August 2014). "Outernet explained: Broadcasting the content of the Web". Los Angeles Times. Archived from the original on 12 August 2014.
- Leege, Rebecca (17 September 2015). "Education to Children in Crisis and Conflict Zones". Business Fights Poverty (Press release). Archived from the original on 24 January 2022.
- List, Jenny (22 February 2018). "At 71,572 KM, You Won't Beat This LoRa Record". Hackaday. Archived from the original on 22 February 2018.
- Machado, Mariela (21 October 2015). "Will Outernet Bring Connectivity to the Unconnected Parts of the World?". ICT Works. Archived from the original on 21 September 2019.
- Maloney, Dan (20 November 2016). "Portable Classroom Upgrade: Smaller, Cheaper, Faster". Hackaday. Archived from the original on 24 October 2025.
- Meng, Angela (13 March 2014) [12 March 2014]. "Broadcast data project could provide free uncensored internet to anyone in the world". South China Morning Post. Archived from the original on 13 March 2014.
- Moon, Mariella (25 February 2016). "Project Empathy shares knowledge with unconnected schools". Engadget. Archived from the original on 9 November 2020.
- Nardi, Tom (10 September 2018). "Direction Finding And Passive Radar With RTL-SDR". Hackaday. Archived from the original on 10 September 2018.
- Neal, Meghan (4 February 2014). "The 'Outernet' Wants to Give Internet to the Entire World". Vice. Archived from the original on 22 March 2026.
- Neal, Meghan (15 April 2014). "How the 'Outernet' Plans to Broadcast Free Internet from Space". Vice. Archived from the original on 11 November 2020.
- O'Donovan, Caroline (16 July 2015). "Can Outernet Bring Information To The World Faster Than The Internet?". BuzzFeed News. Archived from the original on 18 September 2019.
- Park, Jane (13 July 2015). "Help Outernet and Creative Commons build a #LibraryFromSpace". Creative Commons (Press release). Archived from the original on 16 November 2016.
- Plenke, Max (13 March 2015). "A Startup Is Using the Space Race to Provide Internet for Countries Run by Dictators". MIC. Archived from the original on 14 March 2015.
- Rannals, Lee (4 May 2018) [17 February 2014]. "New Project Aims To Offer Free Global WiFi Service From Outer Space". RedOrbit.com. Archived from the original on 2 March 2014.
- Rogers, Kayleigh (13 March 2015). "Satellites Will Beam One-Way Internet to the Earth's Most Remote Areas". Vice. Archived from the original on 25 March 2026.
- Schieber, Jonathan (13 March 2015). "Outernet Joins The Space Race For Internet Accessibility". TechCrunch. Archived from the original on 14 March 2015.
- Schwartz, Ariel (31 October 2014). "These Tiny Satellites Could Bring Internet Access To The Entire Planet". Fast Company. Archived from the original on 17 September 2019.
- Seagall, Laurie (25 February 2014). Tiny cubes will beam Netflix from space?. CNNMoney (Video). CNN.
- Sharwood, Simon (3 February 2014). "Chaps propose free global WiFi delivered FROM SPAAAACE". The Register. Archived from the original on 4 December 2021.
- Siméon, Gabriel; Guiton, Amaelle (17 July 2015). "Enquête: Le Net dans les nuages" [Investigation: The Internet in the clouds]. Libération (in French). Archived from the original on 9 September 2021.
- Simonite, Tom (15 May 2015). "Startup Beams the Web's Most Important Content from Space, Free". MIT Technology Review. Archived from the original on 19 September 2020.
- Stinson, Liz (20 August 2014). "A Tiny Satellite Dish That Brings Info to the World's Dead Zones". Wired. Archived from the original on 21 August 2014.
- Tarantola, Andrew (19 November 2014). "What Is the Outernet and Is It the Future of the Internet?". Gizmodo. Archived from the original on 19 November 2014.
- Trudel, Pierre (1 March 2014). "Outernet: l'utopie de l'Internet universel libre et gratuit" [Outernet: the utopia of uncensored universal Internet at no charge]. Le Journal de Montréal. Archived from the original on 17 September 2015.
- Vallaincourt, Patrick (25 February 2014). "Outernet aims to provide everyone with news and information". The Other Press. Archived from the original on 21 October 2014.
- Vatter, André (16 October 2014). "Das Outernet: Web-Hoffnung für benachteiligte Nationen" [The Outernet: Web hope for disadvantaged nations]. iQ by Intel (in German). Archived from the original on 6 December 2014.
- Vivion, Nick (21 March 2015). "Lantern connects you to the world's information without an Internet connection". USA Today. Archived from the original on 25 March 2026.
- Vorona, Timur (18 February 2014). Проект Outernet: бесплатный Wi-Fi для всей планеты с 2015 года [Outernet project: free Wi-Fi for the entire planet beginning in 2015]. ain.ua (in Ukrainian). Archived from the original on 18 September 2020.
- Williams, Al (20 June 2017). "Testing The Outernet Dreamcatcher SDR". Hackaday. Archived from the original on 20 June 2017.
- Zak, Dan (29 April 2014). "Free WiFi is a selling point in NoMa, but why isn't the Internet free wherever we'd want it?". The Washington Post. Gale A366381107. Archived from the original on 30 April 2014.
