= Facebook for SIM =

Facebook for SIM, also called LinqUs Facebook for SIM, is a client/server SIM application developed by international digital security company Gemalto that enabled people to access Facebook using the SMS protocol on their mobile phones, without needing a data plan. Facebook cooperated closely with Gemalto in the development of the product. Carriers that were partnering with Gemalto to offer this service included Entel in Chile, Tigo in Colombia, and Telecom Personal in Argentina.

== History ==
Gemalto first announced Facebook for SIM at the Mobile World Congress in Barcelona, Spain.

The service launched in October 2011, with the carrier Telecom Personal in Argentina being the first carrier to adopt it.

In September 2013, Gemalto updated Facebook for SIM to include Facebook Messenger.

Since then, the service has been decommissioned.

== See also ==
- Facebook Zero
- Google Free Zone
- Wikipedia Zero
