= Tuteria =

Tuteria is a Nigerian platform for offline and online tutoring, co-founded in 2015 by Godwin Benson and Abiola Oyeniyi, systems engineers.

== Background ==
Goodwin Benson and Abiola Oyeniyi launched Tuteria -a tutoring platform- on June 9, 2015 after Godwin Benson left Deloitte. The platform is intended to link tutors with Nigerian learners. Benson was inspired by his own experience as a tutor to launch this project and Abiola Oyeniyi who is one of the top Python developers in Nigeria is the CTO of Tuteria and writes the code. Other notable members of the Tuteria team include Two-time Best Graduating Student-Peace Cole, COO and Kehinde Ishie who joined the team at the onset.

The selection of potential tutors is ensured by a verification process that includes an ID and qualifications check along with standard competency tests.

== Awards ==
In April 2015, Tuteria's developers were among the winners of the Microsoft Mobile devices and services “Passion to Empire” campaign. The start-up was able to raise N3.5million during this campaign.

In 2016, Tuteria won the Internet.org innovation challenge for education.

On May 23, 2017, Tuteria won Africa Prize for Engineering Innovation and received a US$32,000 prize by UK's Royal Academy of Engineering.

== Services ==
The website caters for a wide range of learners and it has 450 approved subjects with 6 main fields: mathematics, science, business, music, languages and computer science.

The tutoring platform also accommodates for other handcrafts and skills like bead-making, dance and photography.

== Funding and revenue ==
Tuteria received a $20 000 grant from Niara-Africa Inspire and Microsoft Lumia Nigeria.

The tutoring platform generates revenue from commissions on lessons booked via the website or the mobile application. Tuteria charges 15 to 30% for each paid lesson.
