= Net neutrality =

Principle that Internet service providers should treat all data equally

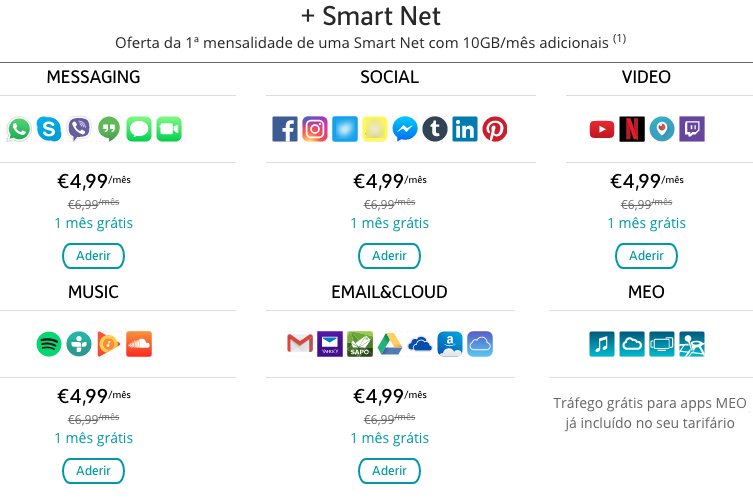
Portuguese Internet service provider MEO offered smartphone contracts with monthly data limits, and sells additional monthly packages for particular data services. Critics of EU net neutrality rules say loopholes allow data for different services to be sold under zero rating exceptions to data limits. Consumer advocates of net neutrality have cited this pricing model as an illustration of Internet access with weak net neutrality protection.

Net neutrality, sometimes referred to as network neutrality, is the principle that Internet service providers (ISPs) must treat all Internet communications equally, offering users and online content providers consistent transfer rates regardless of content, website, platform, application, type of equipment, source address, destination address, or method of communication (i.e. without price discrimination). Net neutrality was advocated for in the 1990s by the presidential administration of Bill Clinton in the United States. Clinton signed the Telecommunications Act of 1996, an amendment to the Communications Act of 1934. In 2025, an American court ruled that Internet companies should not be regulated like utilities, which weakened net neutrality regulation and put the decision in the hands of the United States Congress and state legislatures.

Supporters of net neutrality argue that it prevents ISPs from filtering Internet content without a court order, fosters freedom of speech and democratic participation, promotes competition and innovation, prevents dubious services, and maintains the end-to-end principle, and that users would be intolerant of slow-loading websites. Opponents argue that it reduces investment, deters competition, increases taxes, imposes unnecessary regulations, prevents the Internet from being accessible to lower-income individuals, and prevents Internet traffic from being allocated to the most needed users, that large ISPs already have a performance advantage over smaller providers, and that there is already significant competition among ISPs with few competitive issues.

== Etymology ==
The term was coined by Columbia University media law professor Tim Wu in 2003 as an extension of the longstanding concept of a common carrier which was used to describe the role of telephone systems.

== Regulatory considerations ==
Net neutrality regulations may be referred to as common carrier regulations. Net neutrality does not block all abilities that ISPs have to impact their customers' services. Opt-in and opt-out services exist on the end user side, and filtering can be done locally, as in the filtering of sensitive material for minors.

Research suggests that a combination of policy instruments can help realize the range of valued political and economic objectives central to the network neutrality debate. Combined with public opinion, this has led some governments to regulate broadband Internet services as a public utility, similar to the way electricity, gas, and the water supply are regulated, along with limiting providers and regulating the options those providers can offer.

Proponents of net neutrality, which include computer science experts, internet policy experts, several non-profit organizations, and Internet content providers, assert that net neutrality helps to provide freedom of information exchange, promotes competition and innovation for Internet services, and upholds standardization of Internet data transmission which was essential for its growth.

Opponents of net neutrality, which include ISPs, computer hardware manufacturers, economists, technologists, and telecommunications equipment manufacturers, argue that net neutrality requirements would reduce their incentive to build out the Internet and reduce competition in the marketplace, and may raise their operating costs, which they would have to pass along to their users.

== Definition and related principles ==
=== Internet neutrality ===
Network neutrality is the principle that all Internet traffic should be treated equally. According to Columbia Law School professor Tim Wu, a public information network will be most useful when this is the case.

Internet traffic consists of various types of digital data sent over the Internet between all kinds of devices (e.g., data center servers, personal computers, mobile devices, video game consoles, etc.), using hundreds of different transfer technologies. The data includes email messages; HTML, JSON, and all related web browser MIME content types; text, word processing, spreadsheet, database and other academic, business or personal documents in any conceivable format; audio and video files; streaming media content; and countless other formal, proprietary, or ad-hoc schematic formats—all transmitted via myriad transfer protocols.

Indeed, while the focus is often on the type of digital content being transferred, network neutrality includes the idea that if all such types are to be treated equally, then it follows that any ostensibly arbitrary choice of protocol—that is, the technical details of the actual communications transaction itself—must be as well. For example, the same digital video file could be accessed by viewing it live while the data is being received (HLS), interacting with its playback from a remote server (DASH), by receiving it in an email message (SMTP), or by downloading it from either a website (HTTP), an FTP server, or via BitTorrent, among other means. Although all of these use the Internet for transport, and the content received locally is ultimately identical, the interim data traffic is dramatically different depending on which transfer method is used. To proponents of net neutrality, this suggests that prioritizing any one transfer protocol over another is generally unprincipled, or that doing so penalizes the free choices of some users.

In sum, net neutrality is the principle that an ISP be required to provide access to all sites, content, and applications at the same speed, under the same conditions, without blocking or giving preference to any content. Under net neutrality, whether a user connects to Netflix, Wikipedia, YouTube, or a family blog, their ISP must treat them all the same. Without net neutrality, an ISP can influence the quality that each experience offers to end users, which suggests a regime of pay-to-play, where content providers can be charged to improve the exposure of their own products versus those of their competitors.

=== Open Internet ===
Under an open Internet system, the full resources of the Internet and means to operate on it should be easily accessible to all individuals, companies, and organizations. Applicable concepts include: net neutrality, open standards, transparency, lack of Internet censorship, and low barriers to entry. The concept of the open Internet is sometimes expressed as an expectation of decentralized technological power, and is seen by some observers as closely related to open-source software, a type of software program whose maker allows users access to the code that runs the program, so that users can improve the software or fix bugs. Proponents of net neutrality see neutrality as an important component of an open Internet, wherein policies such as equal treatment of data and open web standards allow those using the Internet to easily communicate, and conduct business and activities without interference from a third party.

In contrast, a closed Internet refers to the opposite situation, wherein established persons, corporations, or governments favor certain uses, restrict access to necessary web standards, artificially degrade some services, or explicitly filter out content. Some countries such as Thailand block certain websites or types of sites, and monitor and/or censor Internet use using Internet police, a specialized type of law enforcement, or secret police. Other countries such as Russia, China, and North Korea also use similar tactics to Thailand to control the variety of Internet media within their respective countries. In comparison to the United States or Canada for example, these countries have far more restrictive Internet service providers. This approach is reminiscent of a closed platform system, as both ideas are highly similar. These systems all serve to hinder access to a wide variety of Internet service, which is a stark contrast to the idea of an open Internet system.

=== Dumb pipe ===
The term dumb pipe was coined in the early 1990s and refers to water pipes used in a city water supply system. In theory, these pipes provide a steady and reliable source of water to every household without discrimination. In other words, it connects the user with the source without any intelligence or decrement. Similarly, a dumb network is a network with little or no control or management of its use patterns.

Experts in the high-technology field will often compare the dumb pipe concept with smart pipes and debate which one is best applied to a certain portion of Internet policy. These conversations usually refer to these two concepts as being analogous to the concepts of open and closed Internet respectively. As such, certain models have been made that aim to outline four layers of the Internet with the understanding of the dumb pipe theory:

- Content Layer: Contains services such as communication as well as entertainment videos and music.
- Applications Layer: Contains services such as e-mail and web browsers.
- Logical Layer (also called the Code Layer): Contains various Internet protocols such as TCP/IP and HTTP.
- Physical Layer: Consists of services that provide all others such as cable or wireless connections.

=== End-to-end principle ===
The end-to-end principle of network design was first laid out in the 1981 paper End-to-end arguments in system design by Jerome H. Saltzer, David P. Reed, and David D. Clark. The principle states that, whenever possible, communications protocol operations should be defined to occur at the end-points of a communications system, or as close as possible to the resources being controlled. According to the end-to-end principle, protocol features are only justified in the lower layers of a system if they are a performance optimization; hence, TCP retransmission for reliability is still justified, but efforts to improve TCP reliability should stop after peak performance has been reached.

They argued that, in addition to any processing in the intermediate systems, reliable systems tend to require processing in the end-points to operate correctly. They pointed out that most features in the lowest level of a communications system impose costs for all higher-layer clients, even if those clients do not need the features, and are redundant if the clients have to re-implement the features on an end-to-end basis. This leads to the model of a minimal dumb network with smart terminals, a completely different model from the previous paradigm of the smart network with dumb terminals. Because the end-to-end principle is one of the central design principles of the Internet, and because the practical means for implementing data discrimination violate the end-to-end principle, the principle often enters discussions about net neutrality. The end-to-end principle is closely related and sometimes seen as a direct precursor to the principle of net neutrality.

=== Traffic shaping ===
Traffic shaping is the control of computer network traffic to optimize or guarantee performance, improve latency (i.e., decrease Internet response times), or increase usable bandwidth by delaying packets that meet certain criteria. In practice, traffic shaping is often accomplished by throttling certain types of data, such as streaming video or P2P file sharing. More specifically, traffic shaping is any action on a set of packets (often called a stream or a flow) that imposes additional delay on those packets such that they conform to some predetermined constraint (a contract or traffic profile). Traffic shaping provides a means to control the volume of traffic being sent into a network in a specified period (bandwidth throttling), or the maximum rate at which the traffic is sent (rate limiting), or more complex criteria such as generic cell rate algorithm.

=== Over-provisioning ===
If the core of a network has more bandwidth than is permitted to enter at the edges, then good quality of service (QoS) can be obtained without policing or throttling. For example, telephone networks employ admission control to limit user demand on the network core by refusing to create a circuit for the requested connection. During a natural disaster, for example, most users will get a circuit busy signal if they try to make a call, as the phone company prioritizes emergency calls. Over-provisioning is a form of statistical multiplexing that makes liberal estimates of peak user demand. Over-provisioning is used in private networks such as WebEx and the Internet 2 Abilene Network, an American university network. David Isenberg believes that continued over-provisioning will always provide more capacity for less expense than QoS and deep packet inspection technologies.

=== Device neutrality ===
Device neutrality is the principle that to ensure freedom of choice and freedom of communication for users of network-connected devices, it is not sufficient that network operators do not interfere with their choices and activities; users must be free to use applications of their choice and hence remove the applications they do not want. Device vendors can establish policies for managing applications, but they, too, must be applied neutrally.

An unsuccessful bill to enforce network and device neutrality was introduced in Italy in 2015 by Stefano Quintarelli. The law gained formal support at the European Commission from BEUC, the European Consumer Organisation, the Electronic Frontier Foundation and the Hermes Center for Transparency and Digital Human Rights. A similar law was enacted in South Korea. Similar principles were proposed in China. The French telecoms regulator ARCEP has called for the introduction of device neutrality in Europe.

The principle has been incorporated in the EU's Digital Markets Act (Articles 6.3 an 6.4)

=== Invoicing and tariffs ===
ISPs can choose a balance between a base subscription tariff (monthly bundle) and a pay-per-use (pay by MB metering). The ISP sets an upper monthly threshold on data usage, just to be able to provide an equal share among customers, and a fair use guarantee. This is generally not considered to be an intrusion but rather allows for a commercial positioning among ISPs.

=== Alternative networks ===
Some networks like public Wi-Fi can take traffic away from conventional fixed or mobile network providers. This can significantly change the end-to-end behavior (performance, tariffs).

== Issues ==
=== Discrimination by protocol ===
Discrimination by protocol is the favoring or blocking of information based on aspects of the communications protocol that the computers are using. In the US, a complaint was filed with the Federal Communications Commission (FCC) against the cable provider Comcast alleging they had illegally inhibited users of its high-speed Internet service from using the popular file-sharing software BitTorrent. Comcast admitted no wrongdoing in its proposed settlement of up to US$16 per share in December 2009. However, a U.S. appeals court ruled in April 2010 that the FCC exceeded its authority when it sanctioned Comcast in 2008. However, the FCC spokeswoman Jen Howard responded, "The court in no way disagreed with the importance of preserving a free and open Internet, nor did it close the door to other methods for achieving this important end." Despite the ruling in favor of Comcast, a study by Measurement Lab in October 2011 verified that Comcast had virtually stopped its BitTorrent throttling practices.

=== Discrimination by Internet Protocol (IP) address ===
During the 1990s, creating a non-neutral Internet was technically infeasible. Originally developed to filter harmful malware, the Internet security company NetScreen Technologies released network firewalls in 2003 with so-called deep packet inspection capabilities. Deep packet inspection helped make real-time discrimination between different kinds of data possible, and is often used for Internet censorship.

One criticism regarding discrimination is that the system set up by ISPs for this purpose is capable of not only discriminating but also scrutinizing the full-packet content of communications. For instance, deep packet inspection technology installs intelligence within the lower layers of the network to discover and identify the source, type, and destination of packets, revealing information about packets traveling in the physical infrastructure so it can dictate the quality of transport such packets will receive. This is seen as an architecture of surveillance, one that can be shared with intelligence agencies, copyrighted content owners, and civil litigants, exposing the users' secrets in the process.

In a practice called zero-rating, companies will not invoice data use related to certain IP addresses, favoring the use of those services. Examples include Facebook Zero, Wikipedia Zero, and Google Free Zone. These zero-rating practices are especially common in the developing world. Aside from the zero-rating method, ISPs will also use certain strategies to reduce the costs of pricing plans such as the use of sponsored data. In a scenario where a sponsored data plan is used, a third party will step in and pay for all the content that it (or the carrier or consumer) does not want around. This is generally used as a way for ISPs to remove out-of-pocket costs from subscribers.

Sometimes ISPs will charge some companies, but not others, for the traffic they cause on the ISP's network. French telecom operator Orange, complaining that traffic from YouTube and other Google sites consist of roughly 50% of total traffic on the Orange network, made a deal with Google, in which they charge Google for the traffic incurred on the Orange network. Some also thought that Orange's rival ISP Free throttled YouTube traffic. However, an investigation done by the French telecommunications regulatory body revealed that the network was simply congested during peak hours.

=== Favoring private networks ===
Proponents of net neutrality argue that without new regulations, Internet service providers would be able to profit from and favor their own private networks and that ISPs would be able to pick and choose who they offer a greater bandwidth to. If one website or company is able to afford more, they will go with them. This especially stifles private up-and-coming businesses.

ISPs are able to encourage the use of specific services by using private networks to discriminate what data is counted against bandwidth caps. For example, Comcast struck a deal with Microsoft that allowed users to stream television through the Xfinity app on their Xbox 360s without it affecting their bandwidth limit. However, using other television streaming apps, such as Netflix, HBO Go, and Hulu, counted towards the limit. Comcast denied that this infringed on net neutrality principles since "it runs its Xfinity for Xbox service on its own, private Internet protocol network." In 2009, when AT&T was bundling iPhone 3G with its 3G network service, the company placed restrictions on which iPhone applications could run on its network.

According to net neutrality proponents, this capitalization on which content producers ISPs can favor would ultimately lead to fragmentation, where some ISPs would have certain content that is not necessarily present in the networks offered by other ISPs. The danger behind fragmentation, as viewed by proponents of net neutrality, is the concept that there could be multiple Internets, where some ISPs offer exclusive Internet applications or services or make it more difficult to gain access to Internet content that may be more easily viewable through other Internet service providers. An example of a fragmented service would be television, where some cable providers offer exclusive media from certain content providers.

However, in theory, allowing ISPs to favor certain content and private networks would overall improve Internet services since they would be able to recognize packets of information that are more time-sensitive and prioritize that over packets that are not as sensitive to latency. The issue, as explained by Robin S. Lee and Tim Wu, is that there are literally too many ISPs and Internet content providers around the world to reach an agreement on how to standardize that prioritization. A proposed solution would be to allow all online content to be accessed and transferred freely, while simultaneously offering a fast lane for a preferred service that does not discriminate on the content provider.

=== Peering discrimination ===
There is disagreement about whether peering is a net neutrality issue. In the first quarter of 2014, streaming website Netflix reached an arrangement with ISP Comcast to improve the quality of its service to Netflix clients with a peering agreement whereby Netflix delivered data directly to the Comcast network. This arrangement was made in response to increasingly slow connection speeds through Comcast over the course of 2013, where average speeds dropped by over 25% of their values a year before to an all-time low. After the deal was struck in January 2014, the Netflix speed index recorded a 66% increase. Netflix agreed to a similar deal with Verizon in 2014, after Verizon DSL customers' connection speed dropped to less than 1 Mbit/s early in the year. Netflix spoke out against this deal with a controversial statement delivered to all Verizon customers experiencing low connection speeds, using the Netflix client. This sparked an internal debate between the two companies that led to Verizon's obtaining a cease and desist order on 5 June 2014, that forced Netflix to stop displaying this message.

=== Favoring fast-loading websites ===
Pro-net neutrality arguments have also noted that regulations are necessary due to research showing low tolerance to slow-loading content providers. In a 2009 research study conducted by Forrester Research, online shoppers expected the web pages they visited to download content instantly. When a page fails to load at the expected speed, many of them simply abandon their visit. A study found that even a one-second delay could lead to "11% fewer page views, a 16% decrease in customer satisfaction, and 7% loss in conversions." This delay can cause a severe problem to small innovators who have created new technology. If a website is slow by default, the general public will lose interest and favor a website that runs faster. This helps large corporations maintain dominance because they have the means to fund faster Internet speeds. On the other hand, smaller competitors without the same financial means find it harder for them to succeed in the online world.

== Legal aspects ==
Legal enforcement of net neutrality principles takes a variety of forms, from provisions that outlaw anti-competitive blocking and throttling of Internet services, all the way to legal enforcement that prevents companies from subsidizing Internet use on particular sites. Contrary to popular rhetoric and statements by various individuals involved in the ongoing academic debate, research suggests that a single policy instrument (such as a no-blocking policy or a quality of service tiering policy) cannot achieve the range of valued political and economic objectives central to the debate. As Bauer and Obar suggest, "safeguarding multiple goals requires a combination of instruments that will likely involve government and nongovernment measures. Furthermore, promoting [rights and] goals such as the freedom of speech, political participation, investment, and innovation calls for complementary policies."

== By country ==
Net neutrality is administered on a national or regional basis, though much of the world's focus has been on the conflict over net neutrality in the United States. Net neutrality in the US has been a topic since the early 1990s, as they were one of the world leaders in providing online services. However, they face the same problems as the rest of the world.

In 2019, the Save the Internet Act to "guarantee broadband internet users equal access to online content" was passed by the US House of Representatives but not by the US Senate. Finding an appropriate solution by creating more regulations for ISPs has been a major work in progress. Net neutrality rules were repealed in the US in 2017 during the first Trump administration and subsequent appeals upheld the repeal, until the FCC voted to reinstate them in 2024. On 2 January 2025, however, "a US appeals court...ruled the Federal Communications Commission did not have the legal authority to reinstate landmark net neutrality rules."

Governments of countries that comment on net neutrality usually support the concept.

=== United States ===
Net neutrality in the United States has been a point of conflict between network users and service providers since the 1990s. Much of the conflict over net neutrality arises from how Internet services are classified by the FCC under the authority of the Communications Act of 1934. The FCC would have significant ability to regulate ISPs should Internet services be treated as a Title II "common carrier service". The ISPs would be mostly unrestricted by the FCC if Internet services fell under Title I "information services". In 2009, the United States Congress passed the American Recovery and Reinvestment Act, which granted a stimulus of $2.88 billion for extending broadband services into certain areas of the United States. It was intended to make the Internet more accessible for underserved areas, and aspects of net neutrality and open access were written into the grant. However, the bill never set any significant precedents for net neutrality or influenced future legislation relating to net neutrality.

Until 2017, the FCC had generally been favorable towards net neutrality, treating ISPs under Title II common carrier. With the onset of the Presidency of Donald Trump in 2017, and the appointment of Ajit Pai, an opponent of net neutrality, as chairman of the FCC, the FCC has reversed many previous net neutrality rulings and reclassified Internet services as Title I information services. The FCC's decisions have been a matter of several ongoing legal challenges by both states supporting net neutrality, and ISPs challenging it. The United States Congress has attempted but failed to pass legislation supporting net neutrality. In 2018, a bill cleared the U.S. Senate, with Republicans Lisa Murkowski, John Kennedy, and Susan Collins joining all 49 Democrats, but the House majority denied the bill a hearing. Individual states have been trying to pass legislation to make net neutrality a requirement within their state, overriding the FCC's decision. California has successfully passed its own net neutrality act, which the United States Department of Justice challenged. On 8 February 2021, the U.S. Justice Department withdrew its challenge to California's data protection law. Federal Communications Commission acting chairwoman Jessica Rosenworcel voiced support for an open Internet and restoring net neutrality. Vermont, Colorado, and Washington, among other states, have also enacted net neutrality.

On 19 October 2023, the FCC voted 3–2 to approve a Notice of Proposed Rulemaking (NPRM) that seeks comments on a plan to restore net neutrality rules and regulation of Internet service providers. On 25 April 2024, the FCC voted 3–2 to reinstate net neutrality in the United States by reclassifying the Internet under Title II. However, legal challenges immediately filed by ISPs resulted in an appeals court issuing an order that stays the net neutrality rules until the court makes a final ruling, while issuing the opinion that the ISPs will likely prevail over the FCC on the merits. On 2 January 2025, net neutrality rules, were in fact struck down by US Court of Appeals for the Sixth Circuit in MCP No. 185. According to the ruling, federal law shows that broadband must be classified as information services and not the more heavily regulated telecommunications service, the FCC said it was when it adopted the rules in April 2024 and the FCC lacked the authority to impose its rules on the broadband providers. According to Bloomberg News, the Sixth Circuit's ruling is "one of the highest-profile examples" so far of an appeals court exercising the expanded authority following Loper Bright Enters. v. Raimondo, which overturned a doctrine that had supported agency interpretations of ambiguous laws. The court also rejected a similar FCC classification for mobile broadband providers.

=== Canada ===
Net neutrality in Canada is a debated issue, but not to the degree of partisanship in other nations such as the United States, in part because of its federal regulatory structure and pre-existing supportive laws that were enacted decades before the debate arose. In Canada, ISPs generally provide Internet service in a neutral manner. Some notable incidents otherwise have included Bell Canada's throttling of certain protocols and Telus's censorship of a specific website supporting striking union members. In the case with Bell Canada, the debate for net neutrality became a more popular topic when it was revealed that they were throttling traffic by limiting people's accessibility to view the Canada's Next Great Prime Minister contest, which eventually led to the Canadian Association of Internet Providers (CAIP) demanding the Canadian Radio-television and Telecommunications Commission (CRTC) take action on preventing the throttling of third-party traffic. On 22 October 2009, the CRTC issued a ruling about Internet traffic management, which favored adopting guidelines that were suggested by interest groups such as OpenMedia.ca and the Open Internet Coalition. However, the guidelines set in place require citizens to file formal complaints and proving that their Internet traffic is being throttled. Because of these hurdles for reporting, some ISPs still continue to throttle the Internet traffic of their users.

=== India ===
In 2018, the Indian Government unanimously approved new regulations supporting net neutrality. The regulations are considered to be the "world's strongest" net neutrality rules, guaranteeing free and open Internet for nearly half a billion people. The only exceptions to the rules are new and emerging services like autonomous driving and tele-medicine, which may require prioritized Internet lanes and faster-than-normal speeds.

=== China ===
Net neutrality in China is not respected, and ISPs in China play important roles in regulating the content that is available domestically on the Internet. There are several ISPs filtering and blocking content at the national level, preventing domestic Internet users from accessing certain sites or services and preventing foreign Internet users from gaining access to domestic web content. This filtering technology is referred to as the Great Firewall, or GFW.

An article published by the Cambridge University Press observed the political environment with respect to net neutrality in China. Chinese ISPs have become a way for the country to control and restrict information rather than neutrally providing Internet content.

=== Philippines ===
Net neutrality in the Philippines is not enforced. Mobile Internet providers like Globe Telecom and Smart Communications commonly offer data package promos tied to specific applications, games or websites like Facebook, Instagram, and TikTok.

In the mid-2010s, Philippine telcos came under fire from the Department of Justice for throttling the bandwidth of subscribers of unlimited data plans if the subscribers exceeded arbitrary data caps imposed by the telcos under a supposed "fair use policy" on their "unlimited" plans. Certain adult sites like Pornhub, Redtube, and XTube have also been blocked by some Philippine ISPs at the request of the Philippine National Police through the National Telecommunications Commission. This was performed without the necessary court orders required by the Supreme Court of the Philippines.

== Support ==
Proponents of net neutrality regulations include consumer advocates, human rights organizations such as Article 19, online companies and some technology companies. Net neutrality tends to be supported by those on the political left, while opposed by those on the political right.

Many major Internet application companies are advocates of neutrality, such as eBay, Amazon, Netflix, Reddit, Microsoft, Twitter, Etsy, IAC Inc., Yahoo!, Vonage, and Cogent Communications. In September 2014, an online protest known as Internet Slowdown Day took place to advocate for the equal treatment of Internet traffic. Notable participants included Netflix and Reddit.

Consumer Reports, the Open Society Foundations along with several civil rights groups, such as the ACLU, the Electronic Frontier Foundation, Free Press, Save the Internet, and Fight for the Future support net neutrality.

Individuals who support net neutrality include World Wide Web inventor Tim Berners-Lee, Vinton Cerf, Lawrence Lessig, Robert W. McChesney, Steve Wozniak, Susan P. Crawford, Marvin Ammori, Ben Scott, David Reed, and former U.S. president Barack Obama.

On 10 November 2014, Obama recommended that the FCC reclassify broadband Internet service as a telecommunications service to preserve net neutrality. On 31 January 2015, AP News reported that the FCC would present the notion of applying ("with some caveats") Title II (common carrier) of the Communications Act of 1934 and section 706 of the Telecommunications act of 1996 to the Internet in a vote on 26 February 2015.

=== Control of data ===
Supporters of net neutrality in the United States want to designate cable companies as common carriers, the same model used for dial-up Internet. A common carrier must allow ISPs free access to cable lines. Supporters want to ensure that cable companies cannot screen, interrupt or filter Internet content without a court order. Common carrier status would give the FCC the power to enforce net neutrality rules. Save the Internet accuses cable and telecommunications companies of wanting the role of gatekeepers, being able to control which websites load quickly, load slowly, or do not load at all. According to Save the Internet, these companies want to charge content providers who require guaranteed speedy data delivery – to create advantages for their own search engines, Internet phone services, and streaming video services – and slow or block access to those of competitors.

Vinton Cerf, a co-inventor of the Internet Protocol and current vice president of Google, argues that the Internet was designed without any authorities controlling access to new content or new services. He concludes that the principles responsible for making the Internet such a success would be fundamentally undermined were broadband carriers given the ability to affect what people see and do online. Cerf has also written about the importance of looking at problems like net neutrality through a combination of the Internet's layered system and the multistakeholder model that governs it. He shows how challenges can arise that can implicate net neutrality in certain infrastructure-based cases, such as when ISPs enter into exclusive arrangements with large building owners, leaving the residents unable to exercise any choice in broadband provider.

=== Digital rights and freedoms ===
Proponents of net neutrality argue that a neutral net will foster free speech and lead to further democratic participation on the Internet. Former Senator Al Franken from Minnesota fears that without new regulations, the major Internet service providers will use their position of power to stifle people's rights. He calls net neutrality the "First Amendment issue of our time." The past two decades has been an ongoing battle of ensuring that all people and websites have equal access to an unrestricted platform, regardless of their ability to pay, proponents of net neutrality wish to prevent the need to pay for speech and the further centralization of media power. Lawrence Lessig and Robert W. McChesney argue that net neutrality ensures that the Internet remains a free and open technology, fostering democratic communication and that the monopolization of the Internet would stifle the diversity of independent news sources and the generation of innovative and novel web content.

=== User intolerance for slow-loading sites ===
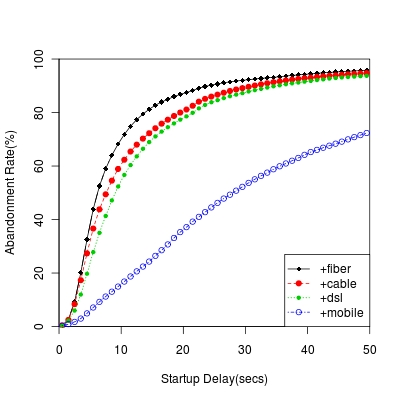
Users with faster Internet connectivity (e.g., fiber) abandon a slow-loading video at a faster rate than users with slower Internet connectivity (e.g., cable or mobile).

Proponents of net neutrality invoke the human psychological process of adaptation where when people get used to something better, they would not ever want to go back to something worse. In the context of the Internet, the proponents argue that a user who gets used to the "fast lane" on the Internet would find the slow lane intolerable in comparison, greatly disadvantaging any provider who is unable to pay for the fast lane. Video providers Netflix and Vimeo in their comments to FCC in favor of net neutrality use the research of S.S. Krishnan and Ramesh Sitaraman that provides the first quantitative evidence of adaptation to speed among online video users. Their research studied the patience level of millions of Internet video users who waited for a slow-loading video to start playing. Users who had faster Internet connectivity, such as fiber-to-the-home, demonstrated less patience and abandoned their videos sooner than similar users with slower Internet connectivity. The results demonstrate how users can get used to faster Internet connectivity, leading to higher expectations of Internet speed, and lower tolerance for any delay that occurs. Author Nicholas Carr and other social commentators have written about the habituation phenomenon by stating that a faster flow of information on the Internet can make people less patient.

=== Competition and innovation ===
Net neutrality advocates argue that allowing cable companies the right to demand a toll to guarantee quality or premium delivery would create an exploitative business model based on the ISPs position as gatekeepers. Advocates warn that by charging websites for access, network owners may be able to block competitor Web sites and services, as well as refuse access to those unable to pay. According to Tim Wu, cable companies plan to reserve bandwidth for their own television services, and charge companies a toll for priority service. Proponents of net neutrality argue that allowing for preferential treatment of Internet traffic, or tiered service, would put newer online companies at a disadvantage and slow innovation in online services. Tim Wu argues that, without network neutrality, the Internet will undergo a transformation from a market ruled by innovation to one ruled by deal-making. SaveTheInternet.com argues that net neutrality puts everyone on equal terms, which helps drive innovation. They claim it is a preservation of the way the Internet has always operated, where the quality of websites and services determined whether they succeeded or failed, rather than deals with ISPs. Lawrence Lessig and Robert W. McChesney argue that eliminating net neutrality would lead to the Internet resembling the world of cable TV, so that access to and distribution of content would be managed by a handful of massive, near monopolistic companies, though there are multiple service providers in each region. These companies would then control what is seen as well as how much it costs to see it. Speedy and secure Internet use for such industries as healthcare, finance, retailing, and gambling could be subject to large fees charged by these companies. They further explain that a majority of the great innovators in the history of the Internet started with little capital in their garages, inspired by great ideas. This was possible because the protections of net neutrality ensured limited control by owners of the networks, maximal competition in this space, and permitted innovators from outside access to the network. Internet content was guaranteed a free and highly competitive space by the existence of net neutrality. For example, back in 2005, YouTube was a small startup company. Due to the absence of Internet fast lanes, YouTube had the ability to grow larger than Google Video. Tom Wheeler and Senators Ronald Lee Wyden (D-Ore.) and Al Franken (D-Minn.) said, "Internet service providers treated YouTube's videos the same as they did Google's, and Google couldn't pay the ISPs [Internet service providers] to gain an unfair advantage, like a fast lane into consumers' homes," they wrote. "Well, it turned out that people liked YouTube a lot more than Google Video, so YouTube thrived."

The lack of competition among internet providers has been cited as a major reason to support net neutrality. The loss of net neutrality in 2017 in the U.S. increased the calls for public broadband.

=== Preserving Internet standards ===
Net neutrality advocates have sponsored legislation claiming that authorizing incumbent network providers to override transport and application layer separation on the Internet would signal the decline of fundamental Internet standards and international consensus authority. Further, the legislation asserts that bit-shaping the transport of application data will undermine the transport layer's designed flexibility.

=== End-to-end principle ===
Some advocates say network neutrality is needed to maintain the end-to-end principle. According to Lawrence Lessig and Robert W. McChesney, all content must be treated the same and must move at the same speed for net neutrality to be true. They say that it is this simple but brilliant end-to-end aspect that has allowed the Internet to act as a powerful force for economic and social good. Under this principle, a neutral network is a dumb network, merely passing packets regardless of the applications they support. This point of view was expressed by David S. Isenberg in his paper, The Rise of the Stupid Network. He states that the vision of an intelligent network is being replaced by a new network philosophy and architecture in which the network is designed for always-on use, not intermittence and scarcity. Rather than intelligence being designed into the network itself, the intelligence would be pushed out to the end-user devices; and the network would be designed simply to deliver bits without fancy network routing or smart number translation. The data would be in control, telling the network where it should be sent. End-user devices would then be allowed to behave flexibly, as bits would essentially be free and there would be no assumption that the data is of a single data rate or data type.

Contrary to this idea, the research paper titled End-to-end arguments in system design by Saltzer, Reed, and Clark argues that network intelligence does not relieve end systems of the requirement to check inbound data for errors and to rate-limit the sender, nor for wholesale removal of intelligence from the network core.

== Criticism ==
Opponents of net neutrality regulations include ISPs, broadband and telecommunications companies, computer hardware manufacturers, economists, and notable technologists.

Many of the major hardware and telecommunications companies specifically oppose the reclassification of broadband as a common carrier under Title II. Corporate opponents of this measure include Comcast, AT&T, Verizon, IBM, Intel, Cisco, Nokia, Qualcomm, Broadcom, Juniper, D-Link, Wintel, Alcatel-Lucent, Corning, Panasonic, Ericsson, Oracle, Akamai, and others. The US Telecom and Broadband Association, which represents a diverse array of small and large broadband providers, is also an opponent. A 2006 campaign against net neutrality was funded by AT&T and members included BellSouth, Alcatel, Cingular, and Citizens Against Government Waste.

Nobel Memorial Prize-winning economist Gary Becker's paper titled, "Net Neutrality and Consumer Welfare", published by the Journal of Competition Law & Economics, argues that claims by net neutrality proponents "do not provide a compelling rationale for regulation" because there is "significant and growing competition" among broadband access providers. Google chairman Eric Schmidt states that, while Google views that similar data types should not be discriminated against, it is okay to discriminate across different data types—a position that both Google and Verizon generally agree on, according to Schmidt. According to the Journal, when President Barack Obama announced his support for strong net neutrality rules late in 2014, Schmidt told a top White House official the president was making a mistake. Google once strongly advocated net-neutrality–like rules prior to 2010, but their support for the rules has since diminished; the company however still remains "committed" to net neutrality.

Individuals who opposed net neutrality rules include Bob Kahn, Marc Andreessen, Scott McNealy, Peter Thiel and Max Levchin, David Farber, David Clark, Louis Pouzin, MIT Media Lab co-founder Nicholas Negroponte, Rajeev Suri, Jeff Pulver, Mark Cuban, Robert Pepper and former FCC chairman Ajit Pai.

Nobel Prize laureate economists who opposed net neutrality rules include Princeton economist Angus Deaton, Chicago economist Richard Thaler, MIT economist Bengt Holmström, and the late Chicago economist Gary Becker. Others include MIT economists David Autor, Amy Finkelstein, and Richard Schmalensee; Stanford economists Raj Chetty, Darrell Duffie, Caroline Hoxby, and Kenneth Judd; Harvard economist Alberto Alesina; Berkeley economists Alan Auerbach and Emmanuel Saez; and Yale economists William Nordhaus, Joseph Altonji and Pinelopi Goldberg.

Some civil rights groups, such as the National Urban League, Jesse Jackson's Rainbow/PUSH, and League of United Latin American Citizens, also opposed Title II net neutrality regulations, citing concerns over stifling investment in underserved areas.

The Wikimedia Foundation, which runs Wikipedia, told The Washington Post in 2014 that it had a "complicated relationship" with net neutrality. The organization partnered with telecommunications companies to provide free access to Wikipedia for people in developing countries, under a program called Wikipedia Zero, without requiring mobile data to access information. The concept is known as zero rating. Said Wikimedia Foundation officer Gayle Karen Young, "Partnering with telecom companies in the near term, it blurs the net neutrality line in those areas. It fulfills our overall mission, though, which is providing free knowledge."

Farber has written and spoken strongly in favor of continued research and development on core Internet protocols. He joined academic colleagues Michael Katz, Christopher Yoo, and Gerald Faulhaber in an op-ed for The Washington Post critical of network neutrality, stating that while the Internet is in need of remodeling, congressional action aimed at protecting the best parts of the current Internet could interfere with efforts to build a replacement.

=== Reduction in investment ===
According to a letter to FCC commissioners and key congressional leaders sent by 60 major ISP technology suppliers including IBM, Intel, Qualcomm, and Cisco, Title II regulation of the Internet "means that instead of billions of broadband investment driving other sectors of the economy forward, any reduction in this spending will stifle growth across the entire economy. This is not idle speculation or fear mongering...Title II is going to lead to a slowdown, if not a hold, in broadband build out, because if you don't know that you can recover on your investment, you won't make it." According to the Wall Street Journal, in one of Google's few lobbying sessions with FCC officials, the company urged the agency to craft rules that encourage investment in broadband Internet networks—a position that mirrors the argument made by opponents of strong net neutrality rules, such as AT&T and Comcast. Opponents of net neutrality argue that prioritization of bandwidth is necessary for future innovation on the Internet. Telecommunications providers such as telephone and cable companies, and some technology companies that supply networking gear, argue telecom providers should have the ability to provide preferential treatment in the form of tiered services, for example by giving online companies willing to pay the ability to transfer their data packets faster than other Internet traffic. The added income from such services could be used to pay for the building of increased broadband access to more consumers.

Opponents say that net neutrality would make it more difficult for ISPs and other network operators to recoup their investments in broadband networks. John Thorne, senior vice president and deputy general counsel of Verizon, a broadband and telecommunications company, has argued that they will have no incentive to make large investments to develop advanced fibre-optic networks if they are prohibited from charging higher preferred access fees to companies that wish to take advantage of the expanded capabilities of such networks. Thorne and other ISPs have accused Google and Skype of freeloading or free riding for using a network of lines and cables the phone company spent billions of dollars to build. Marc Andreessen states that "a pure net neutrality view is difficult to sustain if you also want to have continued investment in broadband networks. If you're a large telco right now, you spend on the order of $20 billion a year on capex [capital expenditure]. You need to know how you're going to get a return on that investment. If you have these pure net neutrality rules where you can never charge a company like Netflix anything, you're not ever going to get a return on continued network investment – which means you'll stop investing in the network. And I would not want to be sitting here 10 or 20 years from now with the same broadband speeds we're getting today."

Proponents of net neutrality regulations say network operators have continued to under-invest in infrastructure. However, according to Copenhagen Economics, U.S. investment in telecom infrastructure is 50 percent higher than in the European Union. As a share of GDP, the United States' broadband investment rate per GDP trails only the UK and South Korea slightly, but exceeds Japan, Canada, Italy, Germany, and France sizably. On broadband speed, Akamai reported that the US trails only South Korea and Japan among its major trading partners, and trails only Japan in the G-7 in both average peak connection speed and percentage of the population connection at 10 Mbit/s or higher, but are substantially ahead of most of its other major trading partners.

The White House reported in June 2013 that U.S. connection speeds are "the fastest compared to other countries with either a similar population or land mass." Akamai's report on "The State of the Internet" in the 2nd quarter of 2014 says "a total of 39 states saw 4K readiness rate more than double over the past year." In other words, as ZDNet reports, those states saw a major increase in the availability of the 15 Mbit/s speed needed for 4K video. According to the Progressive Policy Institute and ITU data, the United States has the most affordable entry-level prices for fixed broadband in the OECD.

In Indonesia, there is a very high number of Internet connections that are subject to exclusive deals between the ISP and the building owner. Representatives of Google, Inc claim that changing this dynamic could unlock much more consumer choices and higher speeds. Former FCC Commissioner Ajit Pai and Federal Election Commission's Lee Goldman also wrote in a Politico piece in February 2015, "Compare Europe, which has long had utility-style regulations, with the United States, which has embraced a light-touch regulatory model. Broadband speeds in the United States, both wired and wireless, are significantly faster than those in Europe. Broadband investment in the United States is several multiples that of Europe. And broadband's reach is much wider in the United States, despite its much lower population density."

VOIP pioneer Jeff Pulver states that the uncertainty of the FCC imposing Title II, which experts said would create regulatory restrictions on using the Internet to transmit a voice call, was the "single greatest impediment to innovation" for a decade. According to Pulver, investors in the companies he helped found, like Vonage, held back investment because they feared the FCC could use Title II to prevent VOIP startups from bypassing telephone networks.

=== Significant and growing competition, investment ===
A 2010 paper on net neutrality by Nobel Prize economist Gary Becker and his colleagues stated that "there is significant and growing competition among broadband access providers and that few significant competitive problems have been observed to date, suggesting that there is no compelling competitive rationale for such regulation." Becker and fellow economists Dennis Carlton and Hal Sidler found that "Between mid-2002 and mid-2008, the number of high-speed broadband access lines in the United States grew from 16 million to nearly 133 million, and the number of residential broadband lines grew from 14 million to nearly 80 million. Internet traffic roughly tripled between 2007 and 2009. At the same time, prices for broadband Internet access services have fallen sharply." The PPI reports that the profit margins of U.S. broadband providers are generally one-sixth to one-eighth of companies that use broadband (such as Apple or Google), contradicting the idea of monopolistic price-gouging by providers.

When FCC chairman Tom Wheeler redefined broadband from 4 Mbit/s to 25 Mbit/s (3.125 MB/s) or greater in January 2015, FCC commissioners Ajit Pai and Mike O'Reilly believed the redefinition was to set up the agency's intent to settle the net neutrality fight with new regulations. The commissioners argued that the stricter speed guidelines painted the broadband industry as less competitive, justifying the FCC's moves with Title II net neutrality regulations.

A report by the Progressive Policy Institute in June 2014 argues that nearly every American can choose from at least 2–4 broadband Internet service providers, despite claims that there are only a "small number" of broadband providers. Citing research from the FCC, the institute wrote that 90 percent of American households have access to at least one wired and one wireless broadband provider at speeds of at least 4 Mbit/s (500 kbyte/s) downstream and 1 Mbit/s (125 kbyte/s) upstream and that nearly 88 percent of Americans can choose from at least two wired providers of broadband disregarding speed (typically choosing between a cable and telco offering). Further, three of the four national wireless companies report that they offer 4G LTE to 250–300 million Americans, with the fourth (T-Mobile) sitting at 209 million and counting. Similarly, the FCC reported in June 2008 that 99.8% of ZIP codes in the United States had two or more providers of high-speed Internet lines available, and 94.6% of ZIP codes had four or more providers, as reported by University of Chicago economists Gary Becker, Dennis Carlton, and Hal Sider in a 2010 paper.

=== Deterring competition ===
FCC commissioner Ajit Pai states that the FCC completely brushes away the concerns of smaller competitors who are going to be subject to various taxes, such as state property taxes and general receipts taxes. As a result, according to Pai, that does nothing to create more competition within the market. According to Pai, the FCC's ruling to impose Title II regulations is opposed by the country's smallest private competitors and many municipal broadband providers. In his dissent, Pai noted that 142 wireless ISPs (WISPs) said that FCC's new "regulatory intrusion into our businesses ... would likely force us to raise prices, delay deployment expansion, or both." He also noted that 24 of the country's smallest ISPs, each with fewer than 1,000 residential broadband customers, wrote to the FCC stating that Title II "will badly strain our limited resources" because they "have no in-house attorneys and no budget line items for outside counsel." Further, another 43 municipal broadband providers told the FCC that Title II "will trigger consequences beyond the Commission's control and risk serious harm to our ability to fund and deploy broadband without bringing any concrete benefit for consumers or edge providers that the market is not already proving today without the aid of any additional regulation."

According to a Wired magazine article by TechFreedom's Berin Szoka, Matthew Starr, and Jon Henke, local governments and public utilities impose the most significant barriers to entry for more cable broadband competition: "While popular arguments focus on supposed 'monopolists' such as big cable companies, it's government that's really to blame." The authors state that local governments and their public utilities charge ISPs far more than they actually cost and have the final say on whether an ISP can build a network. The public officials determine what requirements an ISP must meet to get approval for access to publicly owned rights of way (which lets them place their wires), thus reducing the number of potential competitors who can profitably deploy Internet services—such as AT&T's U-Verse, Google Fiber, and Verizon FiOS. Kickbacks may include municipal requirements for ISPs such as building out service where it is not demanded, donating equipment, and delivering free broadband to government buildings.

According to a research article from MIS Quarterly, the authors stated their findings subvert some of the expectations of how ISPs and CPs act regarding net neutrality laws. The paper shows that even if an ISP is under restrictions, it still has the opportunity and the incentive to act as a gatekeeper over CPs by enforcing priority delivery of content.

=== Counterweight to server-side non-neutrality ===
Those in favor of forms of non-neutral tiered Internet access argue that the Internet is already not a level playing field, and that large companies achieve a performance advantage over smaller competitors by providing more and better-quality servers and buying high-bandwidth services. Should scrapping of net neutrality regulations precipitate a price drop for lower levels of access, or access to only certain protocols, for instance, such would make Internet usage more adaptable to the needs of those individuals and corporations who specifically seek differentiated tiers of service. Network expert Richard Bennett has written, "A richly funded Web site, which delivers data faster than its competitors to the front porches of the Internet service providers, wants it delivered the rest of the way on an equal basis. This system, which Google calls broadband neutrality, actually preserves a more fundamental inequality."

=== Potentially increased taxes ===
FCC commissioner Ajit Pai, who opposed the 2015 Title II reclassification of ISPs, says that the ruling allows new fees and taxes on broadband by subjecting them to telephone-style taxes under the Universal Service Fund. Net neutrality proponent Free Press writes, "the average potential increase in taxes and fees per household would be far less" than the estimate given by net neutrality opponents, and that if there were to be additional taxes, the tax figure may be around US$4 billion. Under favorable circumstances, "the increase would be exactly zero." Meanwhile, the Progressive Policy Institute claims that Title II could trigger taxes and fees up to $11 billion a year. Financial website Nerd Wallet did their own assessment and settled on a possible US$6.25 billion tax impact, estimating that the average American household may see their tax bill increase US$67 annually.

FCC spokesperson Kim Hart said that the ruling "does not raise taxes or fees. Period."

=== Unnecessary regulations ===
According to PayPal founder and Facebook investor Peter Thiel in 2011, "Net neutrality has not been necessary to date. I don't see any reason why it's suddenly become important, when the Internet has functioned quite well for the past 15 years without it. ... Government attempts to regulate technology have been extraordinarily counterproductive in the past." Max Levchin, the other co-founder of PayPal, echoed similar statements, telling CNBC, "The Internet is not broken, and it got here without government regulation and probably in part because of lack of government regulation."

FCC commissioner Ajit Pai, who was one of the two commissioners who opposed the net neutrality proposal, criticized the FCC's ruling on Internet neutrality, stating that the perceived threats from ISPs to deceive consumers, degrade content, or disfavor the content that they dislike are non-existent: "The evidence of these continuing threats? There is none; it's all anecdote, hypothesis, and hysteria. A small ISP in North Carolina allegedly blocked VoIP calls a decade ago. Comcast capped BitTorrent traffic to ease upload congestion eight years ago. Apple introduced Facetime over Wi-Fi first, cellular networks later. "FCC chairman Pai wants to switch ISP rules from proactive restrictions to after-the-fact litigation, which means a lot more leeway for ISPs that don't particularly want to be treated as impartial utilities connecting people to the internet." (Atherton, 2017). Examples this picayune and stale aren't enough to tell a coherent story about net neutrality. The bogeyman never had it so easy." FCC Commissioner Mike O'Reilly, the other opposing commissioner, also claims that the ruling is a solution to a hypothetical problem, "Even after enduring three weeks of spin, it is hard for me to believe that the Commission is establishing an entire Title II/net neutrality regime to protect against hypothetical harms. There is not a shred of evidence that any aspect of this structure is necessary. The D.C. Circuit called the prior, scaled-down version a 'prophylactic' approach. I call it guilt by imagination." In a Chicago Tribune article, FCC commissioner Pai and Joshua Wright of the Federal Trade Commission argue that "the Internet isn't broken, and we don't need the president's plan to 'fix' it. Quite the opposite. The Internet is an unparalleled success story. It is a free, open and thriving platform."

=== Inability to make the Internet accessible to the poor ===
Opponents argue that net neutrality regulations prevent service providers from providing more affordable Internet access to those who can not afford it. A concept known as zero-rating, ISPs would be unable to provide Internet access for free or at a reduced cost to the poor under net neutrality rules. For example, low-income users who can not afford bandwidth-hogging Internet services such as video streams could be exempted from paying through subsidies or advertising. However, under the rules, ISPs would not be able to discriminate traffic, thus forcing low-income users to pay for high-bandwidth usage like other users.

The Wikimedia Foundation, which runs Wikipedia, created Wikipedia Zero to provide Wikipedia free-of-charge on mobile phones to low-income users, especially those in developing countries. However, the practice violates net neutrality rules as traffic would have to be treated equally regardless of the users' ability to pay. In 2014, Chile banned the practice of Internet service providers giving users free access to websites like Wikipedia and Facebook, saying the practice violates net neutrality rules. In 2016, India banned Free Basics application run by Internet.org, which provides users in less developed countries with free access to a variety of websites like Wikipedia, BBC, Dictionary.com, health sites, Facebook, ESPN, and weather reports—ruling that the initiative violated net neutrality.

=== Inability to allocate Internet traffic efficiently ===
Net neutrality rules would prevent the traffic from being allocated to the most needed users, according to David Farber. Because net neutrality regulations prevent a discrimination of traffic, networks would have to treat critical traffic equally with non-critical traffic. According to Farber, "When traffic surges beyond the ability of the network to carry it, something is going to be delayed. When choosing what gets delayed, allowing a network to favor traffic from, say, a patient's heart monitor over traffic delivering a music download makes sense. It also makes sense to allow network operators to restrict harmful traffic, such as viruses, worms, and spam."

== Related issues ==
=== Data discrimination ===
Tim Wu, though a proponent of network neutrality, claims that the current Internet is not neutral as its implementation of best effort generally favors file transfer and other non-time-sensitive traffic over real-time communications. Generally, a network which blocks some nodes or services for the customers of the network would normally be expected to be less useful to the customers than one that did not. Therefore, for a network to remain significantly non-neutral requires either that the customers not be concerned about the particular non-neutralities or the customers not have any meaningful choice of providers, otherwise they would presumably switch to another provider with fewer restrictions.

While the network neutrality debate continues, network providers often enter into peering arrangements among themselves. These agreements often stipulate how certain information flows should be treated. In addition, network providers often implement various policies such as blocking of port 25 to prevent insecure systems from serving as spam relays, or other ports commonly used by decentralized music search applications implementing peer-to-peer networking models. They also present terms of service that often include rules about the use of certain applications as part of their contracts with users. Most consumer Internet providers implement policies like these. The MIT Mantid Port Blocking Measurement Project is a measurement effort to characterize Internet port blocking and potentially discriminatory practices. However, the effect of peering arrangements among network providers are only local to the peers that enter into the arrangements and cannot affect traffic flow outside their scope.

Jon Peha from Carnegie Mellon University believes it is important to create policies that protect users from harmful traffic discrimination while allowing beneficial discrimination. Peha discusses the technologies that enable traffic discrimination, examples of different types of discrimination, and the potential impacts of regulation. Google chairman Eric Schmidt aligns Google's views on data discrimination with Verizon's: "I want to be clear what we mean by Net neutrality: What we mean is if you have one data type like video, you don't discriminate against one person's video in favor of another. But it's okay to discriminate across different types. So you could prioritize voice over video. And there is general agreement with Verizon and Google on that issue." Echoing similar comments by Schmidt, Google's Chief Internet Evangelist and "father of the Internet", Vint Cerf, says that "it's entirely possible that some applications needs far more latency, like games. Other applications need broadband streaming capability in order to deliver real-time video. Others don't really care as long as they can get the bits there, like e-mail or file transfers and things like that. But it should not be the case that the supplier of the access to the network mediates this on a competitive basis, but you may still have different kinds of service depending on what the requirements are for the different applications."

=== Content caching ===
Content caching is the process by which frequently accessed contents are temporarily stored in strategic network positions (e.g., in servers close to the end-users) to achieve several performance objectives. For example, caching is commonly used by ISPs to reduce network congestion and results in a superior quality of experience (QoE) perceived by the final users.

Since the storage available in cache servers is limited, caching involves a process of selecting the contents worth storing. Several cache algorithms have been designed to perform this process which, in general, leads to storing the most popular contents. The cached contents are retrieved at a higher QoE (e.g., lower latency), and caching can be therefore considered a form of traffic differentiation. However, caching is not generally viewed as a form of discriminatory traffic differentiation. For example, the technical writer Adam Marcus states that "accessing content from edge servers may be a bit faster for users, but nobody is being discriminated against and most content on the Internet is not latency-sensitive". In line with this statement, caching is not regulated by legal frameworks that are favourable to net neutrality, such as the Open Internet Order issued by the FCC in 2015. Even more so, the legitimacy of caching has never been put in doubt by opponents of net neutrality. On the contrary, the complexity of caching operations (e.g., extensive information processing) has been successively regarded by the FCC as one of the technical reasons why ISPs should not be considered common carriers, which legitimates the abrogation of net neutrality rules. Under a net neutrality regime, prioritization of a class of traffic with respect to another one is allowed only if several requirements are met (e.g., objectively different QoS requirements). However, when it comes to caching, a selection of contents of the same class has to be performed (e.g., set of videos worth storing in cache servers). In the spirit of general deregulation with regard to caching, there is no rule that specifies how this process can be carried out in a non-discriminatory way. Nevertheless, the scientific literature considers the issue of caching as a potentially discriminatory process and provides possible guidelines to address it. For example, a non-discriminatory caching might be performed considering the popularity of contents, or with the aim of guaranteeing the same QoE to all the users, or, alternatively, to achieve some common welfare objectives.

As far as content delivery networks (CDNs) are concerned, the relationship between caching and net neutrality is even more complex. In fact, CDNs are employed to allow scalable and highly-efficient content delivery rather than to grant access to the Internet. Consequently, differently from ISPs, CDNs are entitled to charge content providers for caching their content. Therefore, although this may be regarded as a form of paid traffic prioritization, CDNs are not subject to net neutrality regulations and are rarely included in the debate. Despite this, it is argued by some that the Internet ecosystem has changed to such an extent that all the players involved in the content delivery can distort competition and should be therefore also included in the discussion around net neutrality. Among those, the analyst Dan Rayburn suggested that "the Open Internet Order enacted by the FCC in 2015 was myopically focussed on ISPs".

=== Quality of service ===
Internet routers forward packets according to the diverse peering and transport agreements that exist between network operators. Many networks using Internet protocols now employ quality of service (QoS), and Network Service Providers frequently enter into Service Level Agreements with each other embracing some sort of QoS. There is no single, uniform method of interconnecting networks using IP, and not all networks that use IP are part of the Internet. IPTV networks are isolated from the Internet and are therefore not covered by network neutrality agreements. The IP datagram includes a 3-bit wide Precedence field and a larger DiffServ Code Point (DSCP) that are used to request a level of service, consistent with the notion that protocols in a layered architecture offer service through Service Access Points. This field is sometimes ignored, especially if it requests a level of service outside the originating network's contract with the receiving network. It is commonly used in private networks, especially those including Wi-Fi networks where priority is enforced. While there are several ways of communicating service levels across Internet connections, such as SIP, RSVP, IEEE 802.11e, and MPLS, the most common scheme combines SIP and DSCP. Router manufacturers now sell routers that have logic enabling them to route traffic for various Classes of Service at wire-speed.

Quality of service is sometimes taken as a measurement through certain tools to test a user's connection quality, such as Network Diagnostic Tools (NDT) and services on speedtest.net. These tools are known to be used by National Regulatory Authorities (NRAs), who use these QoS measurements as a way of detecting net neutrality violations. However, there are very few examples of such measurements being used in any significant way by NRAs, or in network policy for that matter. Often, these tools are used not because they fail at recording the results they are meant to record, but because said measurements are inflexible and difficult to exploit for any significant purpose. According to Ioannis Koukoutsidis, the problems with the current tools used to measure QoS stem from a lack of a standard detection methodology, a need to be able to detect various methods in which an ISP might violate net neutrality, and the inability to test an average measurement for a specific population of users.

With the emergence of multimedia, VoIP, IPTV, and other applications that benefit from low latency, various attempts to address the inability of some private networks to limit latency have arisen, including the proposition of offering tiered service levels that would shape Internet transmissions at the network layer based on application type. These efforts are ongoing and are starting to yield results as wholesale Internet transport providers begin to amend service agreements to include service levels.

Advocates of net neutrality have proposed several methods to implement a net-neutral Internet that includes a notion of quality-of-service:

- An approach offered by Tim Berners-Lee allows discrimination between different tiers while enforcing strict neutrality of data sent at each tier: "If I pay to connect to the Net with a given quality of service, and you pay to connect to the net with the same or higher quality of service, then you and I can communicate across the net, with that quality and quantity of service." "[We] each pay to connect to the Net, but no one can pay for exclusive access to me."
- United States lawmakers have introduced bills that would now allow quality of service discrimination for certain services as long as no special fee is charged for higher-quality service.

=== Wireless networks ===
There are also some discrepancies in how wireless networks affect the implementation of net neutrality policy, some of which are noted in the studies of Christopher Yoo. In one research article, he claimed that "...bad handoffs, local congestion, and the physics of wave propagation make wireless broadband networks significantly less reliable than fixed broadband networks."

=== Pricing models ===
Broadband Internet access has most often been sold to users based on Excess Information Rate or maximum available bandwidth. If ISPs can provide varying levels of service to websites at various prices, this may be a way to manage the costs of unused capacity by selling surplus bandwidth (or "leverage price discrimination to recoup costs of 'consumer surplus'"). However, purchasers of connectivity on the basis of Committed Information Rate or guaranteed bandwidth capacity must expect the capacity they purchase in order to meet their communications requirements. Various studies have sought to provide network providers with the necessary formulas for adequately pricing such a tiered service for their customer base. But while network neutrality is primarily focused on protocol-based provisioning, most of the pricing models are based on bandwidth restrictions.

Many Economists have analyzed net neutrality to compare various hypothetical pricing models. For instance, economic professors Michael L. Katz and Benjamin E. Hermalin at the University of California Berkeley co-published a paper titled, "The Economics of Product-Line Restrictions with an Application to the Network Neutrality Debate" in 2007. In this paper, they compared the single-service economic equilibrium to the multi-service economic equilibriums under net neutrality.

=== Reactions to removing net neutrality in the US ===
On 12 July 2017, an event called the Day of Action was held to advocate net neutrality in the United States in response to Ajit Pai's plans to remove government policies that upheld net neutrality. Several websites participated in this event, including ones such as Amazon, Netflix, Google, and several other just as well-known websites. The gathering was called "the largest online protest in history." Websites chose many different ways to convey their message. The founder of the web, Tim Berners-Lee, published a video defending FCC's rules. Reddit made a pop-up message that loads slowly to illustrate the effect of removing net neutrality. Other websites also put up some less obvious notifications, such as Amazon, which put up a hard-to-notice link, or Google, which put up a policy blog post as opposed to a more obvious message.

A poll conducted by Mozilla showed strong support for net neutrality across US political parties. Out of the approximately 1,000 responses received by the poll, 76% of Americans, 81% of Democrats, and 73% of Republicans, support net neutrality. The poll also showed that 78% of Americans do not think that Trump's government can be trusted to protect access to the Internet. Net neutrality supporters had also made several comments on the FCC website opposing plans to remove net neutrality, especially after a segment by John Oliver regarding this topic was aired on his show Last Week Tonight. He urged his viewers to comment on the FCC's website, and the flood of comments that were received crashed the FCC's website, with the resulting media coverage of the incident inadvertently helping it to reach greater audiences. However, in response, Ajit Pai selected one particular comment that specifically supported removal of net neutrality policies.

At the end of August, the FCC released more than 13,000 pages of net neutrality complaints filed by consumers, one day before the deadline for the public to comment on Ajit Pai's proposal to remove net neutrality. It has been implied that the FCC ignored evidence against their proposal to remove the protection laws faster. It has also been noted that nowhere was it mentioned how FCC made any attempt to resolve the complaints made. Regardless, Ajit Pai's proposal has drawn more than 22 million comments, though a large amount was spam. However, there were 1.5 million personalized comments, 98.5% of them protesting Ajit Pai's plan.

As of January 2018, fifty senators had endorsed a legislative measure to override the Federal Communications Commission's decision to deregulate the broadband industry. The Congressional Review Act paperwork was filed on 9 May 2018, which allowed the Senate to vote on the permanence of the new net neutrality rules proposed by the Federal Communications Commission. The vote passed and a resolution was approved to try to remove the FCC's new rules on net neutrality; however, officials doubted there was enough time to completely repeal the rules before the Open Internet Order officially expired on 11 June 2018. A September 2018 report from Northeastern University and the University of Massachusetts, Amherst found that U.S. telecom companies are indeed slowing Internet traffic to and from those two sites in particular along with other popular apps. In March 2019, congressional supporters of net neutrality introduced the Save the Internet Act in both the House and Senate, which if passed would reverse the FCC's 2017 repeal of net neutrality protections.

=== Rural digital divide ===
A digital divide is referred to as the difference between those who have access to the internet and those using digital technologies based on urban against rural areas. In the U.S., government city tech leaders warned in 2017 that the FCC's repeal of net neutrality will widen the digital divide, negatively affect small businesses, and job opportunities for middle class and low-income citizens. The FCC reports on their website that Americans in rural areas reach only 65 percent, while in urban areas reach 97 percent of access to high-speed Internet. Public Knowledge has stated that this will have a larger impact on those living in rural areas without internet access. In developing countries like India that don't have reliable electricity or internet connections has only 9 percent of those living in rural areas that have internet access compared to 64 percent of those in urban areas that have access.

== See also ==
- Concentration of media ownership
- Economic rent
- Industrial information economy
- Killswitch (film)
- Media regulation
- Neutrality (philosophy)
- Search neutrality
- Switzerland (software)
