= Internet.org =

Facebook and a group of zero-rated third-party websites that vary by country

- Mission statement: "Connecting the world"
- Type of project: Affordable access to Internet services
- Products: Free Basics; Express Wi-Fi
- Founder: Facebook
- Established: August 20, 2013; 13 years ago
- Status: Active
- Website: info.internet.org

Internet.org is a partnership between social networking services company Meta Platforms and six companies (Samsung, Ericsson, MediaTek, Opera Software, Nokia and Qualcomm) with the goal of providing affordable access to selected Internet services to less developed countries by increasing efficiency, and facilitating the development of new business models around the provision of Internet access. The app delivering these services was renamed Free Basics in September 2015. As of April 2018, 100 million people were using internet.org. As of 2026, Free Basics remains available for download through the Google Play Store as "Free Basics by Facebook."

It has been criticized for violating net neutrality, and by handpicking internet services that are included, for discriminating against companies not in the list, including competitors of Meta Platforms' subsidiary Facebook. In February 2016, regulators banned the Free Basics service in India based on "Prohibition of Discriminatory Tariffs for Data Services Regulations". The Telecom Regulatory Authority of India (TRAI) accused Facebook of failing to pass on the four questions in the regulator's consultation paper and of blocking access to TRAI's designated email for users to send feedback about Free Basics. On February 11, 2016, Facebook withdrew the Free Basics platform from India. In July 2017, Global Voices published the widespread report "Free Basics in Real Life" analyzing its practices in Africa, Asia and Latin America, and concluding it violates net neutrality, focuses on "Western corporate content", and overall "it's not even very helpful".

== History ==
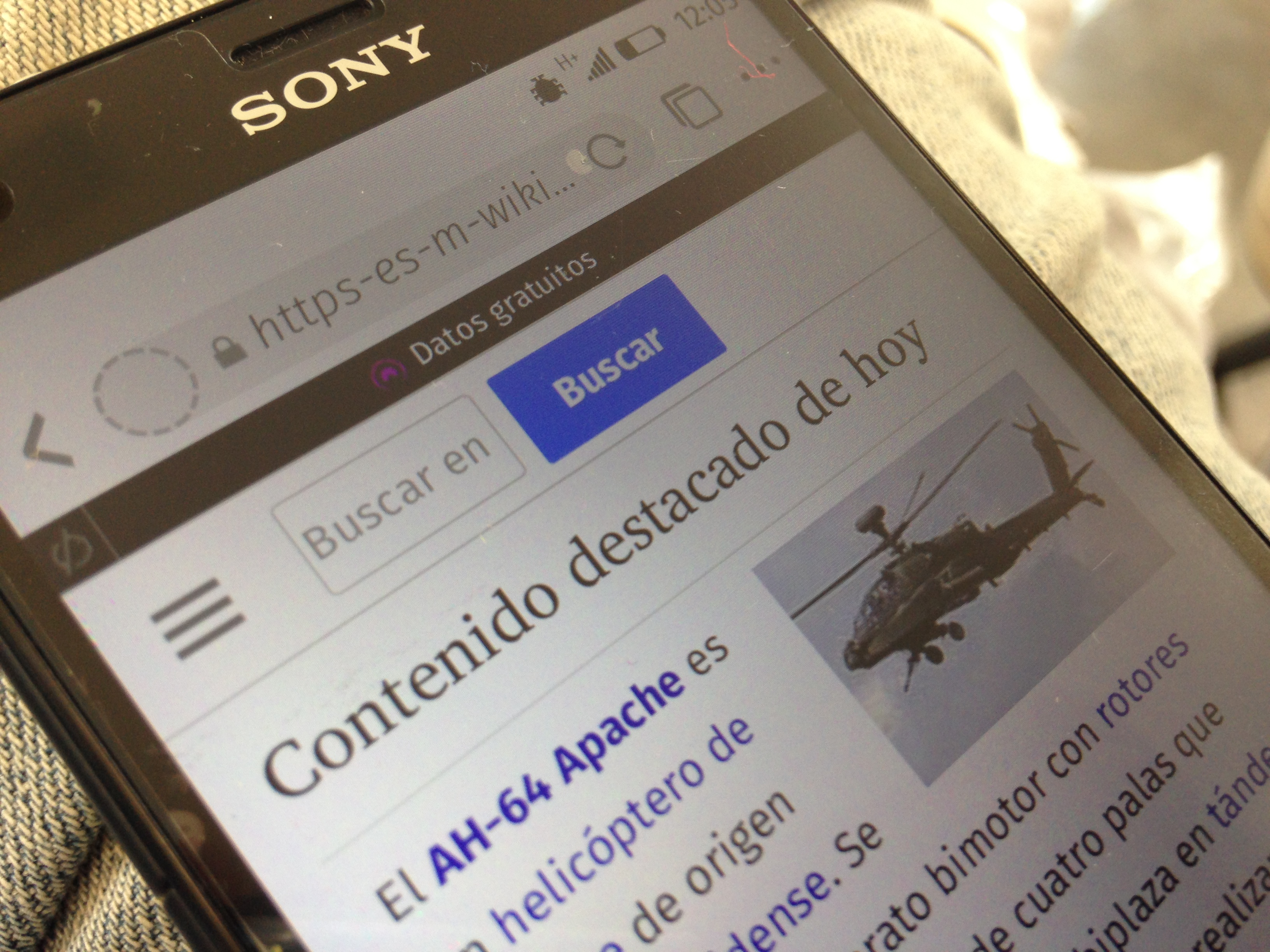
Mobile with Free Basics zero rating plan showing Spanish Wikipedia main page in Mexico

Internet.org was launched on August 20, 2013. At the time of launch, Facebook's founder and CEO Mark Zuckerberg released a ten-page whitepaper he had written elaborating on the vision that asserts that connectivity is a "human right". In the paper, he wrote that Internet.org was a further step in the direction of Facebook's past initiatives, such as Facebook Zero, to improve Internet access for people around the world.

During TechCrunch Disrupt on September 11, 2013 Zuckerberg elaborated further on his vision. TechCrunch compared Internet.org with Google's Project Loon. Zuckerberg also released a video on September 30, 2013 explaining Internet.org's goal of making the Internet 100 times more affordable.

On February 24, 2014, shortly before a keynote presentation by Zuckerberg at the Mobile World Congress in Barcelona, Internet.org unveiled several new projects: an education partnership called SocialEDU with Nokia and local carrier AirTel, edX, and the government in Rwanda; a project with Unilever in India; and a new Internet.org Innovation Lab with Ericsson in its Menlo Park HQ. In the presentation, Zuckerberg says that Facebook's recent acquisition of mobile messaging app WhatsApp for $19 billion was closely related to the Internet.org vision.

In May 2015, Facebook announced the Internet.org Platform, an open program for developers to easily create services that integrate with Internet.org. This was seen by commentators as a response to concerns raised over net neutrality. Participating websites must meet three criteria:

1. Explore the entire internet (so as to give users a taste of the wider Internet and therefore help them see the value of the Internet),
2. Efficiency of data use (so that it would be economical for carriers to allow free access to the websites), and
3. Technical specifications: optimized for browsing on a wide range of devices including smartphones and less sophisticated mobile devices, and should not be dependent on JavaScript or HTTPS.

=== Satellite development ===
On March 27, 2014, Facebook announced a connectivity lab as part of the Internet.org initiative, with the goal of bringing the Internet to everybody via drones acquired from the company Ascenta. Connectivity Lab also stated that low-Earth orbit and geosynchronous satellites would be part of the project for establishing internet connectivity in other areas. All three systems would rely on free-space optics, where the signal is sent in a compact bundle of infrared light.

At Mobile World Congress March 2015, Mark Zuckerberg says that the Internet.org initiative was "willing to work" with Project Loon, Google's project to use high-altitude balloons to provide people cheaper Internet access. However, he emphasized that in his view, the real work is in partnering with existing telecommunications companies to improve access and reduce costs for people already within range of a network, which he estimates at over 80% of the population.

In October 2015, Facebook and Eutelsat leased the entire Ka-band capacity (36 spot beams with a total throughput of 18 Gbit/s) on the planned AMOS-6 satellite to provide access to parts of Africa. AMOS-6 was intended to be launched on flight 29 of a SpaceX Falcon 9 to geosynchronous transfer orbit on 3 September 2016. However, on 1 September 2016, during the run-up to a static fire test, there was an anomaly on the launch pad resulting in a fire and the loss of the vehicle and its payload, AMOS-6. There were no injuries.

In January 2016, Google had exited Facebook's Free Basics platform in Zambia. They were included in the initial trial of this project, which was first launched in Zambia.

In 2021, Robi launched internet.org in Bangladesh, which is the third-largest network operator on this country (26.3 million), behind Bangalink (32 million) and Grameenphone (52.3 million).

=== Net neutrality criticism in India ===
The first Internet.org summit was held on 9 October 2014 in New Delhi, India. The primary objective of this summit was to bring together experts, officials and industry leaders to focus on ways to deliver more Internet services for people in languages other than English. Zuckerberg also met Indian Prime Minister Narendra Modi to talk about how Facebook and the Indian government can collaborate on Internet.org.

In 2015, after criticism of Internet.org, which has a partnership with Reliance in India, Mark Zuckerberg stated in an article for Hindustan Times that Internet.org and net neutrality can co-exist, and Internet.org will never differentiate between services. His claims were contested by many response articles, including one published in the Hindustan Times. In May 2015, the Internet.org Platform, open to participation by any developers meeting specified guidelines, was announced. Some commentators viewed this announcement as a response to the net neutrality concerns expressed. The PMO has expressed displeasure at Facebook's reaction to and handling of TRAI's consultation paper, calling it a crudely majoritarian and orchestrated opinion poll.

An Indian journalist, in his reply to Mark Zuckerberg's article, criticized Internet.org as "being just a Facebook proxy targeting India's poor" as it provides restricted Internet access to Reliance Telecom's subscribers in India. Until April 2015, Internet.org users could access (for free) only a few websites, and Facebook's role as gatekeeper in determining what websites were in that list was criticised for violating net neutrality. In May 2015, Facebook announced that the Free Basics Platform would be opened to websites that met its criteria.

In April 2015, some Indian startups started pulling out of Internet.org to protect net neutrality. The Telecom Regulatory Authority of India (TRAI) in January 2016 criticized Facebook for its misleading commercials and astroturfing the Free Basics campaign. TRAI accused Facebook of failing to pass on the four questions in the regulator's consultation paper and also blocking access to TRAI's designated email for feedback on Free Basics. On February 8, 2016, TRAI banned the Free Basics service in India based on "Prohibition of Discriminatory Tariffs for Data Services Regulations, 2016" notification. On February 11, 2016 Facebook withdrew the Free Basics platform from India.

In May 2017, Facebook, in partnership with Indian telecoms operator Bharti Airtel, launched a service under the Express Wi-Fi banner.

== Participants ==
Below is a selective history of launch dates and participating mobile networks:

- July 2014: Zambia
- October 2014: Tanzania
- November 2014: Kenya
- January 2015: Colombia
- January 2015: Ghana, with Airtel
- 10 February 2015: India with Reliance Communications. Service permanently banned by TRAI one year later.
- 18 March 2015 and 7 October 2015: Philippines with Smart Communications and Globe Telecom
- 31 March 2015: Guatemala with Tigo
- 20 April 2015: Indonesia with Indosat
- 10 May 2015 – 18 July 2020: Bangladesh with Robi
- 13 May 2015: Malawi with TNM and Airtel
- 28 May 2015 and 26 March 2016: Pakistan with Telenor Pakistan and Zong Pakistan respectively
- 5 June 2015: Senegal with Tigo
- 19 June 2015: Bolivia with VIVA
- 22 June 2015: Angola with Movicel
- 1 July 2015: South Africa with Cell C
- 22 October – 30 December 2015: Egypt with Etisalat. Service terminated by the NTRA after Facebook refused to offer surveillance capabilities for the government.
- 16 December 2015: Iraq with Korek Telecom
- 10 May 2016: Nigeria with Airtel Africa
- 2 June 2016: Madagascar with Bip
- June 2016: Myanmar with Myanma Posts and Telecommunications
- February 2017: Nigeria with Etisalat Nigeria
- March 2017: Algeria with Ooredoo
- April 2017: Belarus with life:)
- 2021: Bangladesh with Robi
- Unknown year: Vietnam with Vinaphone (no longer active, succeeded by Zing and Zalo)

== Reception ==
=== Expanding Internet access ===
An article published on Datamation in August 2013 discussed Internet.org in relation to past accessibility initiatives by Facebook and Google such as Facebook Zero, Google Free Zone, and Project Loon. Internet.org and Project Loon have been described as being engaged in an Internet space race. There have also been technical debates about the relative feasibility and value of using balloons (as championed by Project Loon) instead of drones, with Mark Zuckerberg favoring drones.

In December 2013, David Talbot wrote a detailed article for Technology Review titled Facebook's Two Faces: Facebook and Google Aim to Fix Global Connectivity, but for Whom? about Internet.org and other Internet accessibility initiatives.

=== User experience research ===
In 2015, researchers evaluating how Facebook Zero shapes information and communication technologies (ICT) usage in the developing world found that 11% of Indonesians who said they used Facebook also said they did not use the Internet. 65% of Nigerians, and 61% of Indonesians agree with the statement that "Facebook is the Internet" compared with only 5% in the US.

== See also ==
- Airtel Zero
- Alliance for Affordable Internet
- Facebook Zero
  - Express Wi-Fi
- Fon (company)
- Geostationary balloon satellite
- Google Free Zone
- Guifi.net
- O3b Networks
- Open Compute Project
- Outernet
- Project Loon
- Telecom Infra Project
- Wikipedia Zero
- Zero-rating
