= Jon Peha =

Jon Michael Peha is a full professor of electrical engineering at Carnegie Mellon University. Peha holds a Ph.D. in electrical engineering from Stanford University and BS from Brown University. He is also known for his work at SRI International, Bell Labs, and Microsoft.

Peha was a recipient of the Brown Engineering Medal in 2013 and was named a fellow of the American Library Association in 2017. He was named a Fellow of the Institute of Electrical and Electronics Engineers (IEEE) in 2012 for his contributions to wireless and broadband technology for public safety communications.
