= Google Free Zone =

Global initiative by Google

Google Free Zone was a global initiative undertaken by the Internet company Google in collaboration with mobile phone-based Internet providers, whereby the providers waive data (bandwidth) charges (also known as zero-rate) for accessing select Google products such as Google Search, Gmail, and Google+. In order to use this service, users were required to have a Google account and a phone that had access to an internet connection.

== History ==
- November 2012: Google Free Zone was announced by Google on November 8, 2012, with a launch in the Philippines in partnership with Globe Telecom, with the experimental round scheduled to run until March 31, 2013. Telkom Mobile in South Africa, then branded as 8ta, offered Google Free Zone 3 from 13 November 2012 but discontinued the service on 31 May 2013.
- April 2013: launch in Sri Lanka on the Dialog mobile network.
- June 2013: Google launched Google Free Zone in India in partnership with mobile Internet provider Airtel, and in Thailand on the AIS network.
- December 2013: Airtel extended Google Free Zone to its services in Nigeria.
- March 2014: Safaricom in Kenya had launched 60 day promotional Free Zone.

== Reception and impact ==
A number of Internet commentators viewed Google Free Zone as both inspired by and a potential competitor to Facebook Zero.

The Subsecretaria de Telecomunicaciones of Chile ruled that Zero-rating services like Wikipedia Zero, Facebook Zero, and Google Free Zone, that subsidize mobile data usage, violate net neutrality laws and that the practice had to end by June 1, 2014.

In addition to regulatory concerns, digital rights advocates also expressed caution about zero‑rating practices. For example, the Electronic Frontier Foundation noted that such programs, though they increase access, "ultimately zero‑rated services are a dangerous compromise" because they create uneven access to information and may distort user behavior.

== See also ==
- Alliance for Affordable Internet
- Facebook Zero
- Internet.org
- Project Loon
- Wikipedia Zero
- Zero-rating Zero Rating / Toll Free Data / Toll Free Apps
