= Zero-rating =

Internet access under certain conditions

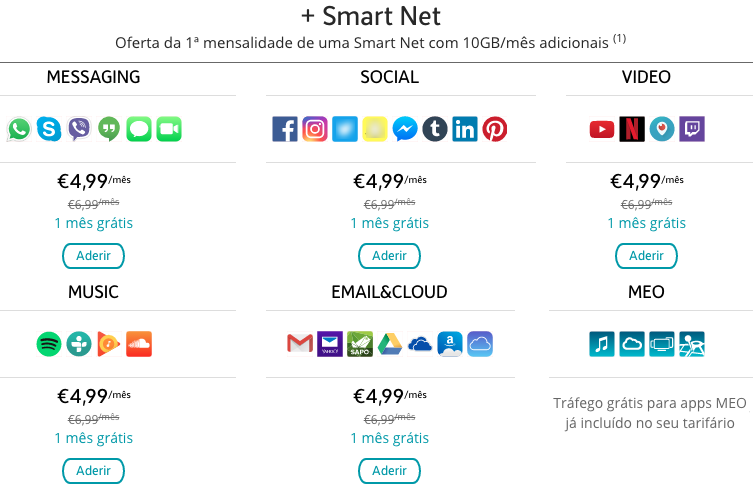
Portuguese company MEO gives zero-rated access to their own service "MEO cloud". Even though it does not provide unlimited mobile data, it offers packages to give zero-rated access to other applications and services. Contrary to popular belief it does not prevent the usage of those applications while using the regular unused data, but instead offers packages where applications and services within the package are not counted towards the data consumed.

Zero-rating is the practice of providing Internet access without financial cost under certain conditions, such as by permitting access to only certain websites or by subsidizing the service with advertising or by exempting certain websites from the data allowance.

Commentators discussing zero-rating present it often in the context of net neutrality. While most sources report that use of zero-rating is contrary to the principle of net neutrality, there are mixed opinions among advocates of net neutrality about the extent to which people can benefit from zero-rating programs while retaining net neutrality protections. Supporters of zero-rating argue that it enables consumers to make choices to access more data and leads to more people using online services, but critics believe zero-rating exploits the poor, creates opportunities for censorship, and disrupts the free market.

== Existing programs ==
Internet services like Facebook, Wikipedia and Google have built special programs to use zero-rating as means to provide their service more broadly into developing markets. The benefit for these new customers, who will mostly have to rely on mobile networks to connect to the Internet, would be a subsidised access to services from these service providers. The results of these efforts have been mixed, with adoption in a number of markets, sometimes overestimated expectations and perceived lack of benefits for mobile network operators. In Chile, the national telecom regulator ruled that this practice violated net neutrality laws and had to end by June 1, 2014. The Federal Communications Commission did not ban zero-rating programs, but it "acknowledged that they could violate the spirit of net neutrality".

Since June 2014, U.S. mobile provider T-Mobile US has offered zero-rated access to participating music streaming services to its mobile internet customers. T-Mobile US launched its plan called “Music Freedom” which would exempt users of T-Mobile US from having to pay premium prices for access to music content; additionally, this content access would not count as part of an individual's cap, which is the limit they can reach before they are charged for data. In November 2015, T-Mobile US expanded zero-rated access to video streaming services.

In January 2016, Verizon joined AT&T by creating its own sponsored data program, FreeBee Data, which "enables content providers to pay a wireless provider to allow its subscribers to engage with or consume a piece of content without it counting against the customers' monthly allotments". Sponsored data on behalf of content providers through AT&T or Verizon covers the costs for the viewers and attracts more consumers. Some people have characterized this as ISPs having created a toll-free service for online users.

Advocates of net neutrality state that sponsored data "allows well-heeled content providers to pay for placement to the disadvantage of smaller companies that can't afford the same luxury". Verizon's FreeBee Data program which allows its own customers to access certain content, like ESPN and its video streaming service, for free along with any other relevant app access and the data will not count against their monthly caps. In this way, big ISPs discriminate against data and content from those who do not pay to have their content included in the FreeBee or other sponsored programs.

Similarly, mobile network operators are also able to use the underlying classification technology like deep packet inspection to redirect enterprise-related data charges for employees using their private tablets or smartphones to their employer. This has the benefit of Toll-free / zero-rated applications allowing employees to participate in bring your own device (BYOD) programs.

In education, and as a response to the closure of school buildings due to the COVID-19 pandemics, Colombian government has created a learning resources platform for mobile phone (movil.colombiaaprende) and "published a decree requesting mobile operators to provide zero-rating conditions for access to specific education services and websites (both voice and data). The government reached an agreement with mobile and Internet operators ensuring all inhabitants have access to educational content and guidelines, in particular lower income households, with a cap at about USD 20."

=== WhatsApp and Facebook cases ===
Starting 2015, Facebook was zero-rated in India. A year after, the local regulator forbade that practice. The popular application WhatsApp has been regularly finger-pointed by various journalists, bloggers and observers, to use intensively the zero-rating practice to encourage mobile users, the usage of its application, for no charge or consumption in the subscription-quota. Countries such as Brazil, South Africa, Argentina, Mexico

In 2017, a long report underlines that a certain number of emerging countries, or small countries, let the zero-rating for a certain number of services, especially for GAFAM ones, others big companies (Yahoo, Twitter), and smaller ones (including music streaming). Those countries, providing zero-rating, are Brazil, Chile, Colombia, Costa Rica, Dominican Republic, Ecuador, El Salvador, Guatemala, Honduras, Jamaica, Mexico, Nicaragua, Paraguay, Peru, and Trinidad and Tobago. That reports alerts that a certain trio of services, are systematically present in each country: Facebook, WhatsApp and Twitter.

== Reception and impact ==
Zero-rating certain services, fast lanes and sponsored data have been criticised as anti-competitive and limiting open markets. It enables internet providers to gain a significant advantage in the promotion of in-house services over competing independent companies, especially in data-heavy markets like video-streaming. A service provider, who is offering unlimited access to their service, will naturally seem more favourable to consumers over one where usage is limited. If the first provider is the one restricting access, they are creating a considerable advantage for themselves over their competition, thereby restricting the freedom of the market. As many new internet and content services are launched targeting primarily mobile usage, and further adoption of internet connectivity globally (including broadband in rural areas of developed countries) relies heavily on mobile, zero-rating has also been regarded as a threat to the open internet, which is typically available via fixed line networks with unlimited usage tariffs or flat rates. Facebook and the Wikimedia Foundation have been specifically criticized for their zero-rating programs, to further strengthen incumbent mobile network operators and limit consumer rights to an open internet.

The United States has not officially made a decision on the regulation of zero-rating providers; instead, adopting a “wait-and-see” approach to the matter. The FCC has therefore elected to examine on a case-by-case basis under a “general conduct rule” that “prohibits unreasonable interference with end users’ ability to select content and content providers’ ability to reach end users”. Days before the Trump inauguration, the Obama administration FCC issued a report expressing concerns with T-Mobile, Verizon and AT&T and their sponsored data programs. The FCC's Wireless Telecommunications Bureau found issues in wireless broadband services that vertically integrate their own affiliated programming, along with service providers allowing unaffiliated content providers to sponsor data. The report concluded that vertically affiliated broadband providers that zero-rate affiliated content most likely violate the general conduct rule.

In the EU, specific cases such as those of Portugal were under scrutiny by national and EU regulators as of 2017, following the BEREC regulation on net neutrality.

In addition to commercial interests, governments with a cultural agenda may support zero-rating for local content.

Zero-rating has also been accused by its critics as creating a two-tiered Internet. To address the issues with zero-rating, an alternative model has emerged in the concept of 'equal rating' and is being tested in experiments by Mozilla and Orange in Africa. Equal rating prevents prioritization of one type of content and zero-rates all content up to a specified data cap. In a study published by Chatham House, 15 out of 19 countries researched in Latin America had some kind of hybrid or zero-rated product offered. Some countries in the region had a handful of plans to choose from (across all mobile network operators) while others, such as Colombia, offered as many as 30 pre-paid and 34 post-paid plans.

A study of eight countries in the Global South found that zero-rated data plans exist in every country, although there is a great range in the frequency with which they are offered and actually used in each. The study looked at the top three to five carriers by market share in Bangladesh, Colombia, Ghana, India, Kenya, Nigeria, Peru and Philippines. Across the 181 plans examined, 13 percent were offering zero-rated services. Another study, covering Ghana, Kenya, Nigeria and South Africa, found Facebook's Free Basics and Wikipedia Zero to be the most commonly zero-rated content.

== See also ==
- Zero-rated supply (economics)
- Facebook Zero
- Wikipedia Zero
- Google Free Zone
- Deep packet inspection (DPI)
- Multichannel video programming distributor (MVPD)
