= Wikipedia Zero =

Project by the Wikimedia Foundation

Logo

Wikipedia Zero was a project by the Wikimedia Foundation to provide access to Wikipedia free of charge on mobile phones via zero-rating, particularly in developing markets. The objective of the program was to facilitate access to free knowledge for low-income pupils and students, by means of waiving the network traffic cost. With 97 operators in over 72 countries, it was estimated that access to Wikipedia was provided to more than 800 million people through the program. The program ended in 2018.

The program was launched in 2012, and won the 2013 South by Southwest Interactive Award for activism. It received criticism over the years for violating the principle of net neutrality. In February 2018, the project announced the end of the initiative, stating that it would take a new strategy on partnerships. Despite providing service to 900 million persons, the project was seen as jeopardized by a lack of growth, and by the declining price of cell phone data.

Facebook Zero has been cited as an inspiration for Wikipedia Zero.

== History ==
Countries with Wikipedia Zero are shown in (green), and countries that were planned to get Wikipedia Zero are shown in (blue), 30 August 2018.

The map alongside shows the broad scale of launches.

In addition to that, Wikimedia Foundation: mobile network partners has a complete list of participating mobile networks and launch dates.

Countries that got Wikipedia Zero
Country	Date	Company
Malaysia	12 May 2012	Digi Telecommunications
Kenya	26 July 2012	Orange S.A.
Thailand	October 2012	dtac
Saudi Arabia	October 2012	Saudi Telecom Company
Pakistan	May 2013	Mobilink
Sri Lanka	June 2013	Dialog Axiata
Jordan	October 2013	Umniah
Bangladesh	October 2013	Banglalink
Kosovo	April 2014	IPKO
Nepal	May 2014	Ncell
Kyrgyzstan	May 2014	Beeline
Nigeria	May 2014	Airtel Nigeria
Ukraine	October 2014	Kyivstar
Ghana	December 2014	MTN Ghana
Angola	December 2014	Unitel S.A.
Algeria	January 2015	Djezzy
Moldova	July 2015	Moldcell
Iraq	March 2017	Asiacell
Afghanistan	September 2017	Roshan

In February 2018, the Wikimedia Foundation announced that the Wikipedia Zero program would be completely phased out by the end of 2018, citing a decline in both user adoption and interest from mobile operators. According to the foundation, the shift in the mobile landscape includes a global trend to more affordable data, making the zero-rated model less effective. Research also revealed that in many target regions, general awareness of Wikipedia was low, limiting the programs' impact.

== Reception and impact ==
Promotional video, produced by the Wikimedia Foundation and narrated by their founder Jimmy Wales

Promotional video about free access to Wikipedia, featuring a school-class from South Africa and their open letter to telecommunication companies

The Subsecretaria de Telecomunicaciones of Chile ruled that zero-rating services like Wikipedia Zero, Facebook Zero, and Google Free Zone, that subsidize mobile data usage, violate net neutrality laws and had to end the practice by 1 June 2014. The Electronic Frontier Foundation has said, "Whilst we appreciate the intent behind efforts such as Wikipedia Zero, ultimately zero rated services are a dangerous compromise." Accessnow.org has been more critical, saying, "Wikimedia has always been a champion for open access to information, but it's crucial to call out zero-rating programs for what they are: Myopic deals that do great damage to the future of the open internet".

The Wikimedia Foundation's Gayle Karen Young defended the program to The Washington Post, saying, "We have a complicated relationship to net neutrality. We believe in net neutrality in America", while adding that Wikipedia Zero required a different perspective in other countries: "Partnering with telecom companies in the near term, it blurs the net neutrality line in those areas. It fulfills our overall mission, though, which is providing free knowledge".

Journalist Hilary Heuler argued that "for many, zero-rated programs would limit online access to the 'walled gardens' offered by the web heavyweights. For millions of users, Facebook and Wikipedia would end up being synonymous with 'internet'." In 2015, researchers evaluating how the similar program Facebook Zero shapes information and communications technology use in the developing world found that 11% of Indonesians who said they used Facebook also said they did not use the Internet. 65% of Nigerians and 61% of Indonesians agree with the statement that "Facebook is the Internet" compared with only 5% in the United States.

An article in Vice magazine notes that the free access via Wikipedia Zero made Wikimedia Commons a preferred way for its users in Bangladesh and elsewhere to share copyrighted material illicitly. This caused problems at Wikimedia Commons (where uploading media that is not free-licensed is forbidden). The Vice article is critical of the situation created by Wikipedia Zero and of the backlash among Wikimedia Commons editors, arguing: "Because they can't afford access to YouTube and the rest of the internet, Wikipedia has become the internet for lots of Bangladeshis. What's crazy, then, is that a bunch of more-or-less random editors who happen to want to be the piracy police are dictating the means of access for an entire population of people."

== See also ==
- Alliance for Affordable Internet
- Google Free Zone
- Internet.org
- Facebook for SIM
- Airtel Zero
