= Tomato (mobile phone operator) =

Mobile phone operator in Croatia

- Company type: Division
- Industry: Telecommunications
- Founded: June 2006; 20 years ago
- Headquarters: Croatia
- Parent: A1
- Website: tomato.com.hr

Tomato is a brand in Croatian mobile communications market owned by A1. It has its own numeration (starting with +385 92) and it is primarily a prepaid product. It functions as a mobile virtual network operator.

== Service ==
Tomato offers 2G (GSM), 3G (HSPA+), 4G (LTE) and 5G voice, text and data services. It was launched in June 2006 and advertised as a cheap network, coinciding with the deployment of the Tele2 network which had the same marketing strategy.
