= A1 Hrvatska =

Croatian telecommunications company

A1 Hrvatska d.o.o.
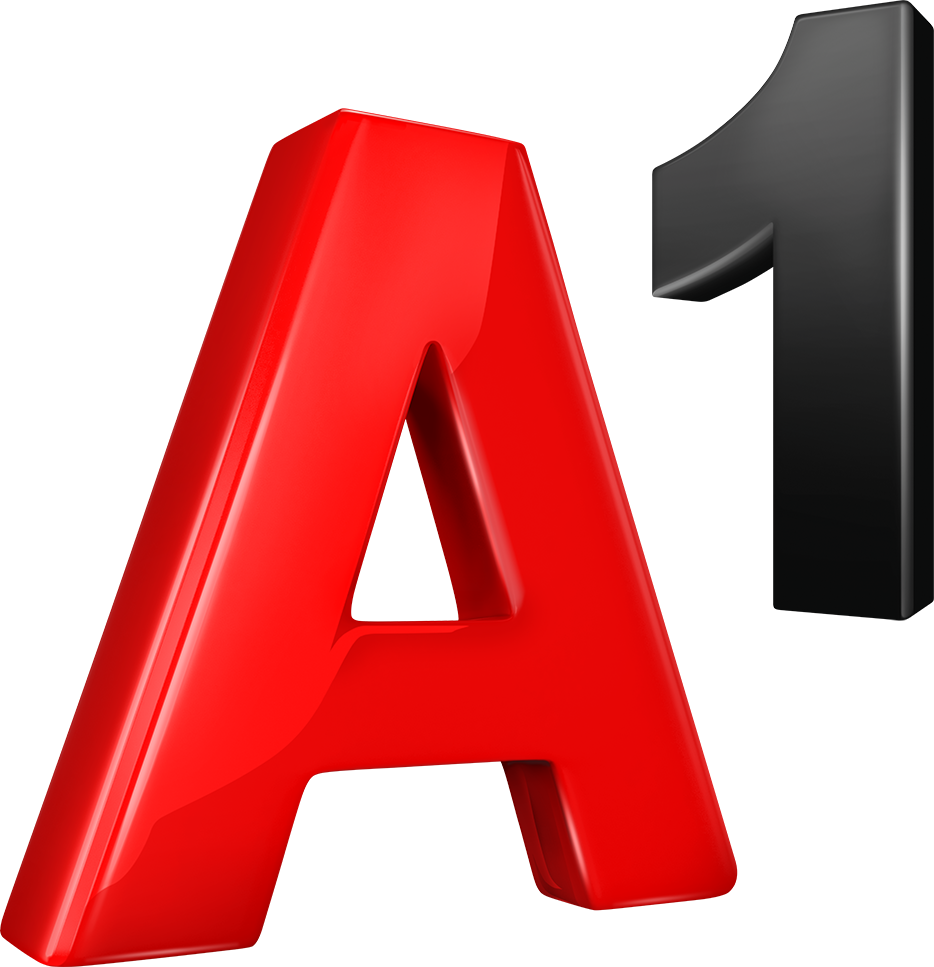
- Type: Limited liability company
- Industry: Telecommunications
- Founded: July 1, 1999; 27 years ago
- Headquarters: Zagreb, Croatia
- Key people: Dejan Turk, Milan Zaletel, Blaž Ferenc, Ivan Skender, Daniel Šimić, Ivana Marković, Vladimir Skender, Boris Gotovac
- Parent: A1 Telekom Austria Group
- Website: a1.hr

A1 Hrvatska d.o.o. (formerly VIP) is a Croatian telecommunications company headquartered in Zagreb. It is a subsidiary of the A1 Telekom Austria Group, a regional provider of digital and communication solutions in Central and Eastern Europe. Employing approximately 2,000 people, the company offers mobile and fixed services, television services, comprehensive business solutions, ICT and cloud services, and develops new digital platforms for about two million users in Croatia. The calling codes of the A1 network are 091 and 092 (Tomato). On October 1, 2018, the former Vipnet changed its name to A1.

A1 Hrvatska owns a gigabit network that covers two-thirds of households in Croatia, and its 5G network covers 98% of the country. It operates the most modern data center in Zagreb, certified with the prestigious Tier III Facility certificate, covering an area of 2,122 square meters.

== Services and partnerships ==
A1 Hrvatska offers a wide range of telecommunications services, as well as services outside its telecommunications portfolio, including streaming services and insurance services for both private and business customers. Business customers also have access to ICT and cloud solutions, including a data center, smart and security solutions, and solutions for the hospitality and tourism sectors. A1 also manages a Security Operations Center (SOC) to protect business customers from cyber threats.

Key partnerships include collaborations with global streaming services Netflix, HBO Max, and SkyShowtime, as well as the integration of Starlink satellite internet, expanding internet availability for users in less-connected and isolated areas.

== History ==
- 1999 – Start of market operations
- 1999 – Introduction of prepaid service (top-up mobile accounts)
- 2001 – Vipnet introduces SMS parking (paying for parking via SMS)
- 2002 – Vipnet introduces MMS messaging
- 2006 – Establishment of the Tomato brand
- 2008 – Vipnet launches HomeBox – the first prepaid fixed-line service in Croatia
- 2011 – Acquisition of B.net
- 2012 – Launch of the 4G network
- 2015 – Acquisition of Amis
- 2016 – Launch of the crowdfunding platform Čini pravu stvar (“Do the Right Thing”)
- 2017 – Acquisition of Metronet
- 2018 – Vipnet changes its name to A1
- 2021 – Establishment of the company A1 Towers for passive mobile telecommunications infrastructure
- 2021 – Launch of the 5G network
- 2021 – Opening of a new data center in Zagreb
- 2021 – Launch of the Life4GreenBroadband project
- 2022 – Launch of the GigaBEEtno project for the preservation of solitary bees and their ecosystem.
- 2022 – Launch of the A1 STEMfemme program
- 2023 – Launch of the platform #BoljiOnline in collaboration with the Center for a Safer Internet (CSI).
- 2023 – The Institute for Social Research in Zagreb launched the STEMfemme Junior program in collaboration with A1 Hrvatska and the City of Split.
- 2024 – Strategic partnership signed with Netflix
- 2024 – A1 data center certified with the prestigious Tier III Facility certificate
- 2024 – Launch of Travel Insurance service for A1 users
- 2025 – Strategic partnership signed with SkyShowtime
- 2025 – A1 Hrvatska began shutting down its 3G network
- 2025 – Launch of the A1 Security Operations Center
- 2025 – Starlink included in A1 Hrvatska’s offering

== See also ==
- List of mobile network operators in Europe
