= Olympus-1 =

Communications satellite

- Mission type: Communication, experimental
- Operator: ESA
- COSPAR ID: 1989-053A
- SATCAT no.: 20122
- Mission duration: 4 years, 1 month

Spacecraft properties
- Bus: L-Sat
- Manufacturer: Astrium; Thales Alenia Space
- Launch mass: 2,612 kilograms (5,758 lb)
- Power: 3600 watts

Start of mission
- Launch date: 12 July 1989
- Rocket: Ariane 3, V32
- Launch site: Guiana Space Centre; Kourou, French Guiana
- Contractor: Arianespace

End of mission
- Disposal: Decommissioned
- Deactivated: 12 August 1993

Orbital parameters
- Reference system: Geocentric
- Regime: Geostationary

Olympus-1 was a communications satellite built by Astrium (at the time of the construction of the satellite British Aerospace and Matra Marconi Space) and Thales Alenia Space (also at the time Alcatel Espace and Alenia Spazio), along with Fokker and SPAR Aerospace, for the European Space Agency. At the time of its launch on 12 July 1989, it was the largest civilian telecommunications satellite ever built, and sometimes known as "LargeSat" or "L-Sat".

== History ==
The satellite had a series of unfortunate accidents in orbit and went out of service on 11/12 August 1993. The first accident was the loss of ability to articulate the satellite's solar arrays. This was later followed by the loss of an on-board gyro during the height of the Perseids meteor shower. The satellite spun out of control and efforts to stabilise it resulted in the expenditure of the majority of its fuel. Subsequently, it was moved to a GEO disposal orbit and was put out of commission. The Olympus bus was reincarnated as Alphabus, made by the same manufacturers, this time for Inmarsat (Inmarsat-4A F4).

== See also ==
- List of European Space Agency programmes and missions
