= Sevsat =

SEVSAT is an acronym for Ship Equip VSAT, a maritime satellite broadband system from the Ship Equip Group with its head office in Norway. Ship Equip is a subsidiary of Inmarsat, a mobile satellite services operator.

== History ==
SEVSAT was developed from 2000–2003, and was initially based on space segment allocations from Eutelsat and Stratos who had implemented the iDirect technology on some of their satellites. In 2004, Stratos closed down their maritime broadband division, and Ship Equip turned to the start-up space segment broker New Wave Broadband and satellite operator Intelsat. These two companies had independently decided to implement iDirect technology on the 907 satellite that covered central and northern Europe, where customers of Ship Equip were primarily located.

From 2004–2006, while focusing primarily on its local markets in the offshore oil, gas and fisheries segments, the number of SEVSAT customers increased rapidly to over 100 installed systems early in 2006, and 200 systems by mid-2007. The rate of growth during this period caught the attention of the media and in April 2006, the leading financial newspaper in Norway, Dagens Næringsliv, ran an article indicating that Ship Equip was challenging Telenor, which at that time was the market leader in maritime VSAT. (Shortly after, Telenor Satellite Services was purchased and merged with France Telecom Mobile Satellite Communications (FTMSC) under the Vizada brand). The article initiated further press coverage from regional newspaper Sunnmørsposten and national newspaper Finansavisen.

In 2009, the Comsys group's annual VSAT report quoted Ship Equip as having a 14.3% share in the maritime VSAT market. In 2011, Ship Equip was purchased by London-based Inmarsat for $159.5 million. According to Inmarsat, at the time of purchase, approximately 10% of vessels using Ku-band VSAT worldwide were using networks provided by Ship Equip.

== Technology ==
SEVSAT includes above deck equipment (ADE) and below deck equipment (BDE). The ADE consists of the antenna which, except for some early deliveries, are SeaTel antennas. Two types of SEVSAT systems exist, C-band and Ku-band, denoting the frequency range in which they are capable of receiving a satellite signal. The C-band antennas are generally large, from 2.4–3.6 m (7.9–11.8 ft) in dish diameter. The Ku-band antennas are smaller, from 1–1.5 m (3.3–4.9 ft) in dish diameter. The BDE most commonly consists of one electronic rack containing the following components: an iDirect modem, the SEVSAT global satellite switching unit, a DAC, Cisco Routers, telephone adapters and a UPS.
