= Broadband Global Area Network =

Global satellite network

The Broadband Global Area Network (BGAN) is a global satellite network with telephony owned by Inmarsat using portable terminals. The terminals are normally used to connect a laptop computer to broadband Internet in remote locations, although as long as line-of-sight to the satellite exists, the terminal can be used anywhere. The value of BGAN terminals is that, unlike other satellite Internet services, which require bulky and heavy satellite dishes to connect, a BGAN terminal is about the size of a laptop and thus can be carried easily. The network is provided by Inmarsat and uses three geostationary satellites called I-4 to provide almost global coverage.

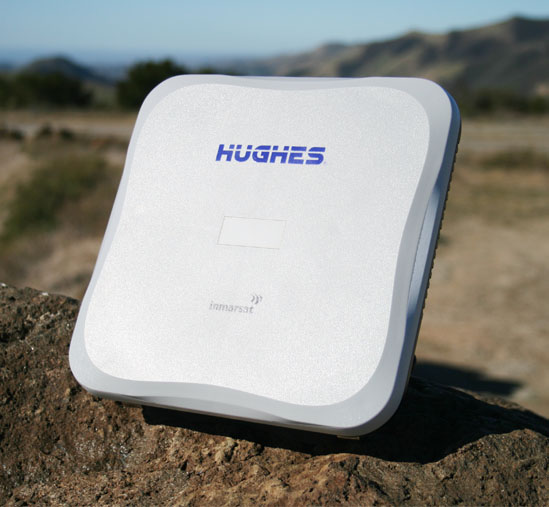
BGAN Terminals, such as this Hughes 9202, are portable and can connect to the Internet from almost anywhere on the globe.

== Details ==
As of 2006, downlink speeds of high-end BGAN terminals are up to 492 kbit/s, and upload speeds are up to 492 kbit/s - Best Effort as BGAN Background IP (BIP) is a contended (shared) channel. As with all geosynchronous satellite connections, latency is an issue. Typical latency is 0.6–1.5 seconds round trip for the Background IP service. It is slightly better for the Streaming services at 800 ms – 1 second. This latency is mainly due to the great distance that has to be traveled before a packet can reach the Internet but is slightly exacerbated by the back-end technology as the average latency over a Very small aperture terminal (VSAT) system is roughly 550 ms. BGAN users frequently use PEP software or other TCP packet accelerators to improve performance, and the BGAN user is often assigned a non-routable IP address and routed through a NAT server; this increases security and helps control usage costs.

Multiple manufacturers make BGAN terminals. They all have similar capabilities. The main two that apply to basic BGAN usage are the Standard Background IP (Internet) and Telephone Voice. BGAN can be easily set up by anyone and has excellent voice calling quality. It uses the L band, avoiding rain fade and other issues affecting satellite systems operating at higher frequency bands.

=== Signal acquisition ===
The actual process of connecting a BGAN terminal to the satellite is pretty straightforward. The BGAN terminal needs to find its position using GPS before it can negotiate with the satellite, so a clear view of the sky is necessary, to begin with. Once the GPS position is obtained, it does not need to do that again unless it is moved to a different region. Getting the initial GPS position can take a few minutes. The terminal then requires a line-of-sight to the geostationary satellite, so a user would typically be outside and have a general idea of what direction the satellite would be (with a compass if necessary). Turning the terminal slowly by hand will give some indication of when the satellite is found. Then usually, with the touch of one button, the terminal auto-negotiates with the satellite and connects. The average pointing time for a BGAN unit is 2 minutes, under a minute with an experienced user and a good signal. BGAN is being used in the world today for disaster response, telemedicine, business continuity, remote site monitoring (telemetry), military use, and recreational use.

== Terminals ==
Terminal manufactures are Thrane & Thrane (now trading as Cobham Satcom), Hughes Network Systems, and Addvalue. Terminal cost is between US$1800 and US$5000, varying based on class and capabilities of the various systems. Depending on terminal type users can connect their computers via USB, Bluetooth, WiFi, or Ethernet connection(s). This allows them to access the Internet, check e-mail, download files, or any other Internet activity they might do at a home or office. Many come equipped with a regular RJ11 Phone Jack for making PSTN calls, using an ordinary telephone handset, and many terminals have an ISDN connection to do ISDN phone calls. Some BGAN terminals have both so that users can make either type of phone call. Users can also send faxes or SMS text messages. Most BGAN terminals can support a router or switch device, so users can plug in multiple computers or even VOIP phones and set up a mobile office.

== Coverage and availability ==
The BGAN service is accessible globally, excluding the poles.

== Service types ==
There is more than one BGAN service available from Inmarsat for BGAN terminals.

=== Standard ===
The Standard BGAN service from Inmarsat provides Internet, phone, SMS texting, Fax, ISDN, and streaming services. It is designed for use with all BGAN terminals except the Hughes 9502, which uses the BGAN M2M service (below).

=== Standard + ===
The Standard + Plus BGAN service introduced by Inmarsat in May 2017 provides unlimited Internet use for a low fixed monthly price using consumer-grade routing. At the same time, not as high priority routing as Standard BGAN service, Standard + does have the same priority as the IsatHub Inmarsat network, which is used worldwide. Standard + has a low monthly subscription that includes 5 Megabytes each month and then bills at a fixed "tier" rate if more than 5 Megabytes are used each month.

=== M2M ===
BGAN M2M Service, launched in February 2012, is a low-bandwidth service for remote SCADA or M2M (machine to machine) equipment monitoring and control. BGAN M2M service is offered in 2, 5, 10, and 20 Megabyte monthly service plans. BGAN M2M service does not charge for overhead communication, and the smallest billing increment is 1 kilobyte, which is ideal for M2M communication (standard BGAN service has a 50 Kilobyte minimum transfer increment). BGAN M2M service is available to a range of BGAN M2M terminals from Hughes and Cobham Satcom.

=== Link ===
BGAN Link, launched in March 2012, is for fixed locations that require 5 to 30 Gigabytes of data transferred per month. In late 2013, Inmarsat introduced Unlimited BGAN Link "GEO" plans for specific countries/regions, including Central and South America, Australia, and lower Africa. Service fees with BGAN Link are far less than standard BGAN service, making this service more comparable to VSAT satellite dish services. One advantage of BGAN terminals is their low power usage (4 watts idle to 22 watts burst transmitting), much less than satellite dish systems that use 90 to 150 watts when idle or transmitting. BGAN Link service is only available with Class 1 BGAN terminals (the Hughes 9201 or the Explorer 700/710), and service terms are 3 and 12 months terms. Terminals may move four times per year with 30 days notice with a US +$1,000 transfer cost and must be at the location for no less than three months. All standard BGAN services are available with BGAN Link (Internet, phone, SMS texting, FAX, Streaming). While BGAN Link service is global, approval by Inmarsat for activation is required.

== Variants ==
BGAN terminals can be used on the open ocean on a moving vessel. However, the likelihood of losing the signal and the connection from a moving watercraft is high. Nevertheless, Inmarsat has informed DPs that the Core network will not block these connections.

Inmarsat has created the FleetBroadband service that uses the I4 satellites for maritime communication.

Standard BGAN terminals cannot be used on moving aircraft due to doppler shift effects. An alternative service using more intelligent terminals to talk to the I4 satellites named SwiftBroadband has been developed for aircraft use.

== News coverage ==
Sky News correspondent Alex Crawford used BGAN equipment to provide live coverage, from a moving truck, of the news network's coverage of the liberation of Tripoli, Libya, in August 2011. This was done by the producer continuously readjusting the BGAN terminal to track the BGAN satellite. Media outlets often use In-Motion BGAN satellite terminals for streaming video on the move. Another advantage to in-motion BGAN systems is saving precious minutes when arriving at a live event. A media vehicle equipped with an in-motion system does not require pointing time since the in-motion BGAN terminal is already locked on a satellite.

== High Data Rate ==
Since late 2013 the service has been available in an enhanced form known as HDR. HDR can exceed symmetric 700 kbit/s on select terminals and support bonding for a bandwidth exceeding 1 Mbit/s. As of 2016 the only terminal to support the full set of modes and bonding is the Cobham Satcom EXPLORER 710.

== See also ==
- FleetBroadband
- SES Broadband
- SwiftBroadBand
- Thuraya
- Iridium Satellite LLC
- Globalstar
- Starlink
