= Stratos Global Corporation =

Canada-based telecommunications company

- Industry: Telecommunications
- Founded: 1985; 41 years ago
- Defunct: 2012
- Headquarters: Bethesda, Maryland, United States
- Parent: Inmarsat (2009-2012)
- Website: stratosglobal.com

Stratos Global Corporation was a Canada-based telecommunications company founded in 1985, mainly serving maritime, government and oil and gas markets around the world. It was acquired by Inmarsat in 2009.

Stratos offers mobile and fixed satellite, microwave and wireless services, including Inmarsat, Iridium satellite constellation, Globalstar, HughesNet, MSAT, and VSAT. It caters to government agencies, military forces, NGOs, first responders, and diverse markets such as aeronautical, energy and natural resources, media, maritime, construction/engineering, and recreational users.

Its corporate headquarters were located in Bethesda, Maryland and had a registered office in St John's, Newfoundland, Canada. It provided products and services through offices worldwide, as well as through a global network of authorized partners.

== AmosConnect ==
AmosConnect is Stratos' PC-based shipboard computer software platform that provides narrowband satellite communications, email, fax, telex, GSM text and interoffice communication for those at sea.

AmosConnect 7.4.27, released in December 2008, is the latest supported version. AmosConnect 8.4.0.1, released in November 2013, was discontinued on 30 June 2017 with the company recommending its customers downgrade to version 7.

In October 2017 it was reported in the news media that all versions of AmosConnect 8 suffered from a severe security vulnerability and had an intentional backdoor that could potentially expose a ship's data whilst at sea. Security consulting firm IOActive had informed Inmarsat of the issues in October 2016.

== History ==
In 1997, Stratos acquired IDB Mobile Communications. In 1998, Stratos acquired NovaNet Communications, American Mobile Satellite Corp., and Teleglobe Canada Inc. In 2000, Stratos acquired Shell Offshore Services, Seven Seas Communications, and Rig Telephones Inc (Datacomm).

On April 15, 2009, Stratos was acquired by Inmarsat but continued to operate as a separate entity under the Stratos name until 2012.

== See also ==
- FleetBroadband
- SES Broadband for Maritime
