= Satellite router =

Component of a very-small-aperture-terminal

A satellite router is an Indoor Unit (IDU) that contains a modulator and a demodulator and is one of the essential components of a VSAT.

== Training ==
Modern VSAT systems utilize a satellite router. Best practice methods for using a satellite router are contained in VSAT training:

- The VSAT Installation Manual Video Presentation shows an example of a satellite router
