= Alphabus =

Family of geostationary communications satellites

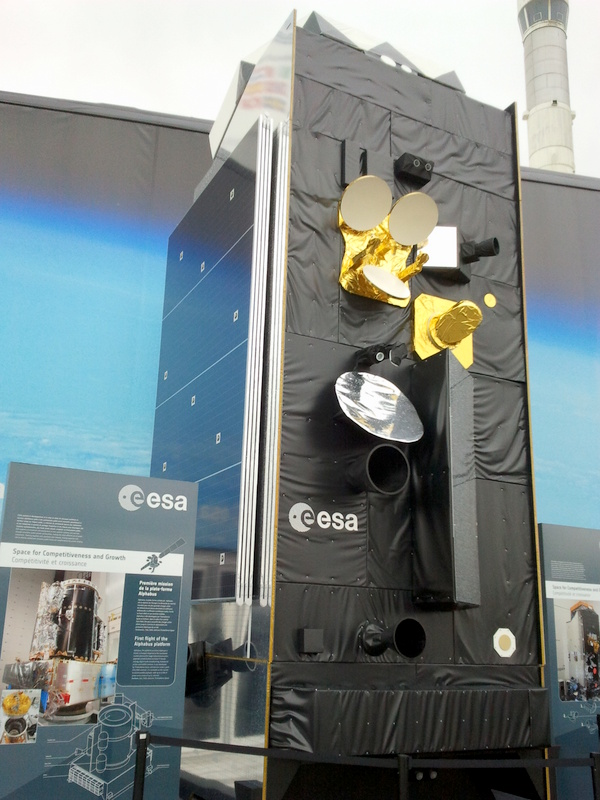
- Full scale mockup Alphasat at Le Bourget Airshow 2013
- Manufacturer: Thales Alenia Space; EADS Astrium Satellites
- Country of origin: Europe
- Applications: Communications satellite bus

Specifications
- Launch mass: 6,550 kilograms (14,440 lb)
- Power: up to 22 kW
- Regime: Geostationary
- Design life: 15 years

Production
- Status: In production
- Built: 1
- Launched: 1
- Operational: 1
- Maiden launch: Inmarsat-4A F4; 25 July 2013

Alphabus is a family of heavy geostationary communications satellites developed by a joint venture between Thales Alenia Space and EADS Astrium Satellites in France, with support of the Centre national d'études spatiales (CNES), the French space agency and the European Space Agency (ESA).

The Alphabus platform is designed for communications satellites with payload power in the range 12-18 kW. Satellites based on Alphabus will have a launch mass in the range 6 to 8 tonnes, 40% more than the most powerful Spacebus 4000.

In order to cover the mission range in an optimised way, the platform product line includes several options such as electric propulsion, and features scalable resources (solar array, radiators for thermal dissipation, etc.). The platform will be able to accommodate up to 190 high power transponders and large antenna farms, and will have a significant growth potential (22 kW payload power and 9 tonnes launch mass for the extended range).

== Product line ==
Development of the new satellite, made in cooperation between the two large European satellite manufacturers, take into account the best lessons learned from previous incarnations of similar satellites: the Spacebus and Eurostar families, respectively from Thales Alenia Space and EADS Astrium Satellites.

- Structure is based on a central tube (the vertebral column of the satellite), like the Spacebus design, with additional carbon and aluminium panels (Section 2800 mm x 2490 mm, Launcher Interface: 1666 mm)
- Chemical propulsion with a 500 N Apogee Engine and 16 x 10 N thrusters; Propellant tanks (Max 4200 kg of bipropellant) and Helium tanks (2x150 litres)
- Electrical propulsion with Xenon tanks (Max 350 kg); PPS 1350 thrusters with thruster orientation (pointing) mechanisms
- Power generation and distribution offering both 100 V and 50 V regulated buses, accommodating two GaAs solar array wings with 4 to 6 panels; modular Lithium-ion battery
- Attitude and Orbit Control (ADCS) with Gyros, Star and Sun Sensors, Reaction Wheels
- Data Handling accommodating a 1553-bus for payload
- Payload allowing for a modular-concept-based setup, comprising an antenna module for easier antenna accommodation and efficient assembly and testing.

== Alphasat (Inmarsat-4A F4) ==
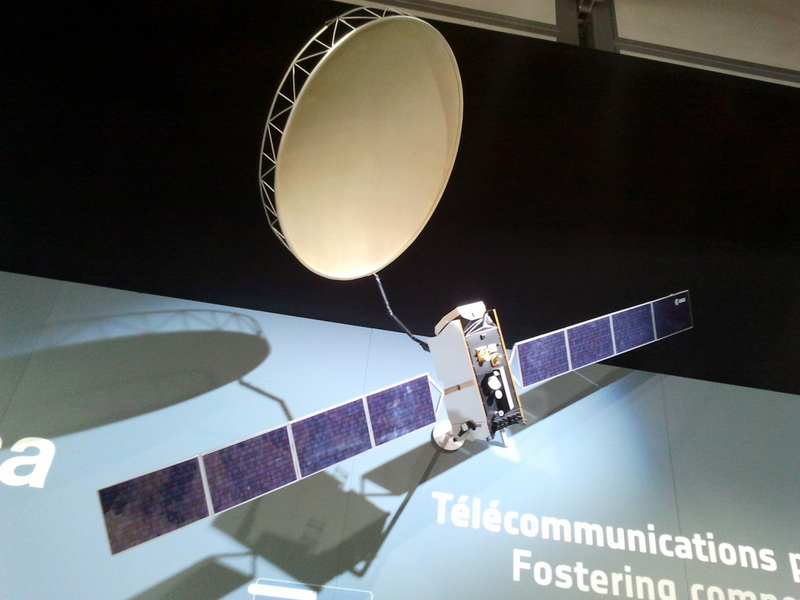
1/10th scale mockup of Alphasat in Le Bourget Airshow 2013

Inmarsat awarded a contract to EADS Astrium Satellites for a first use of such a platform. The satellite is named Alphasat (Inmarsat 4A F4), and will augment Inmarsat's Broadband Global Area Network (BGAN) service supporting a new generation of mobile technologies and enable communications across Europe, Asia, Africa and the Middle East. Alphasat was partially funded by ESA and UK Regional Development Agencies.

=== Demonstration Payloads ===
As well as its primary objective of providing in orbit validation of the Alphabus platform, Alphasat also carries four technology demonstration payloads (TDPs):

- Environmental Testing and Radiation Sensor - Will supply data to provide a more detailed understanding of the radiation environment at geostationary orbit. The data will not only provide Immersat information for operating Alphasat over its lifetime but also inform future satellite designs. This module was built by EFACEC in Portugal
- Q/V band communication and propagation - The communication bands commonly used by telecommunications companies are becoming crowded and so to increase capacity new bandwidths need to be exploited. Parallel Ka and Q band transmitters will develop the understanding of how the Earth's atmosphere affects communication at these wavelengths. This TDP was built by Space Engineering and Thales Alenia Space - Italy under a co-contractorship arrangement.
- Active pixel startracker - Startrackers are vital to ensure satellites remain in the desired orbit, this startracker is based on an active pixel design and boasts good radiation resilience, small size and low power consumption. This module was built by Jena-Optronik Germany
- Optical communications and Ka band downlink - This module tests a new laser based communication system which can offer significantly higher data transfer rates than traditional methods (2.8 Gbit/s). This trial module will take data from a satellite in LEO and transmit it via Alphasat's traditional communication equipment to a ground station. The system is a test for ESA's European Data Relay System which is currently in development. The module was built by TESAT Germany

=== First journey for Alphabus ===
The first service module of the new Alphabus completed its first journey at the end of January 2010 – from Cannes to Toulouse, in France. The three-day trip used an exceptional convoy made up of a 20 m-long lorry carrying the satellite container, several escort cars and a police escort to close off streets and redirect traffic as they passed through urban areas.

=== Launch ===
Alphasat (Inmarsat 4A F4) was launched on 25 July 2013 from French Guiana by early August it had reached a holding position in geostationary orbit and had successfully deployed its solar arrays and 11-metre L-band AstroMesh reflector.

== See also ==
- EADS Astrium Satellites
- Inmarsat
- Thales Alenia Space
