= Inmarsat-4 F3 =

Geosynchronous communication satellite

- Operator: Inmarsat
- COSPAR ID: 2008-039A
- SATCAT no.: 33278

Spacecraft properties
- Bus: Eurostar E3000
- Manufacturer: EADS Astrium
- Launch mass: 5,960 kilograms (13,140 lb)

Start of mission
- Launch date: 18 August 2008
- Rocket: Proton-M/Briz-M
- Launch site: Baikonur 200/39
- Contractor: ILS
- Entered service: 7 January 2009

Orbital parameters
- Reference system: Geocentric
- Regime: Geostationary
- Longitude: 98° West

Inmarsat-4 F3 is a communications I-4 satellite operated by the British satellite operator Inmarsat. It was launched into a geosynchronous orbit at 22:43 GMT on 18 August 2008, by a Proton-M/Briz-M Enhanced carrier rocket. It is currently located at 97.65° West longitude, providing coverage of the Americas. It entered service on 7 January 2009.

Like the earlier Inmarsat-4 F1 and F2 satellites, Inmarsat-4 F3 was constructed by EADS Astrium, using a Eurostar E3000 bus. It has a mass of 5,960 kilograms, and is expected to operate for 13 years. It was originally slated for launch using an Atlas V 531, but was transferred to Proton due to a large backlog of Atlas launches.

In the United States, Inmarsat ground stations are licensed to operate at 1525-1559 MHz and 1626.5-1660.5 MHz. The 1544-1545 MHz and 1645.5-1646.5 MHz bands are reserved for safety and distress communications.
