= I-4 satellite =

The Inmarsat-4 satellites, or I-4 satellites are a satellite constellation operated by Inmarsat. They provide the Inmarsat BGAN, FleetBroadband, and SwiftBroadband communications networks. They operate on the L band everywhere on Earth, except in polar regions.

According to Inmarsat, their launch created the first global 3G mobile network.

The first three were launched between 2005 and 2008. They had a mass (at launch) of 5.96 tonnes, and were intended to last 13 years The dimensions of the main body comparable to a double-decker bus at 7m x 2.9m x 2.3m. Including the solar arrays, however, the wingspan is 45 meters, closer to the size of a soccer pitch. The reflectors are 9 meters wide.

== Data services ==
Both streaming and background data service is provided, where streaming allocates a fixed guaranteed bandwidth to a user, and background uses the excess bandwidth available to a satellite to eventually transmit data.

== See also ==
- Inmarsat-4 F1
- Inmarsat-4 F3
- Inmarsat-4A F4
