= Inmarsat-3 F4 =

Communications satellite

- Mission type: Communications
- Operator: Inmarsat
- COSPAR ID: 1997-027A
- SATCAT no.: 24819
- Mission duration: 13 years (planned); 19 years (achieved)

Spacecraft properties
- Bus: AS-4000
- Manufacturer: Lockheed-Martin Astro Space
- Launch mass: 2,068 kg (4,559 lb)

Start of mission
- Launch date: 3 June 1997, 23:20:06 UTC
- Rocket: Ariane 44L (V97)
- Launch site: Centre Spatial Guyanais, ELA-2
- Contractor: Arianespace

End of mission
- Disposal: Graveyard orbit
- Deactivated: 2016

Orbital parameters
- Reference system: Geocentric orbit
- Regime: Geostationary orbit
- Longitude: 54° West

Transponders
- Coverage area: Atlantic Ocean

Inmarsat-3 F4 is a communications satellite operated by the British satellite operator Inmarsat. It was launched into a geosynchronous orbit on 4 June 1997 from the Guiana Space Centre in Kourou, French Guiana. It was located at 54° West longitude whilst in service, providing coverage of the Americas as Atlantic Ocean Region-West (AOR-W). It was replaced by Inmarsat-3 F5 at 54° West in February 2016, and the now retired Inmarsat-3 F4 was moved to parking at 144° West.

The Inmarsat-3 series spacecraft (F1 through F5) were built by Lockheed-Martin Astro Space as the prime contractor. Lockheed-Martin was responsible for the basic spacecraft bus, and the European Matra Marconi Space, developed the advanced communications payload.

The Inmarsat-3 communications payload can generate a global beam and a maximum of seven spot beams. The spot beams are directed as required to make extra communications capacity available in areas where demand from users is high.

The spacecraft was built using an AS-4000 satellite bus. It has a mass of 2,068 kg (4,559 lb), and is expected to operate for 13 years.

In the United States, Inmarsat ground stations are licensed to operate at 1525-1559 MHz and 1626.5-1660.5 MHz via a mechanism called the ISAT List. The 1544-1545 MHz and 1645.5-1646.5 MHz bands are reserved for safety and distress communications.

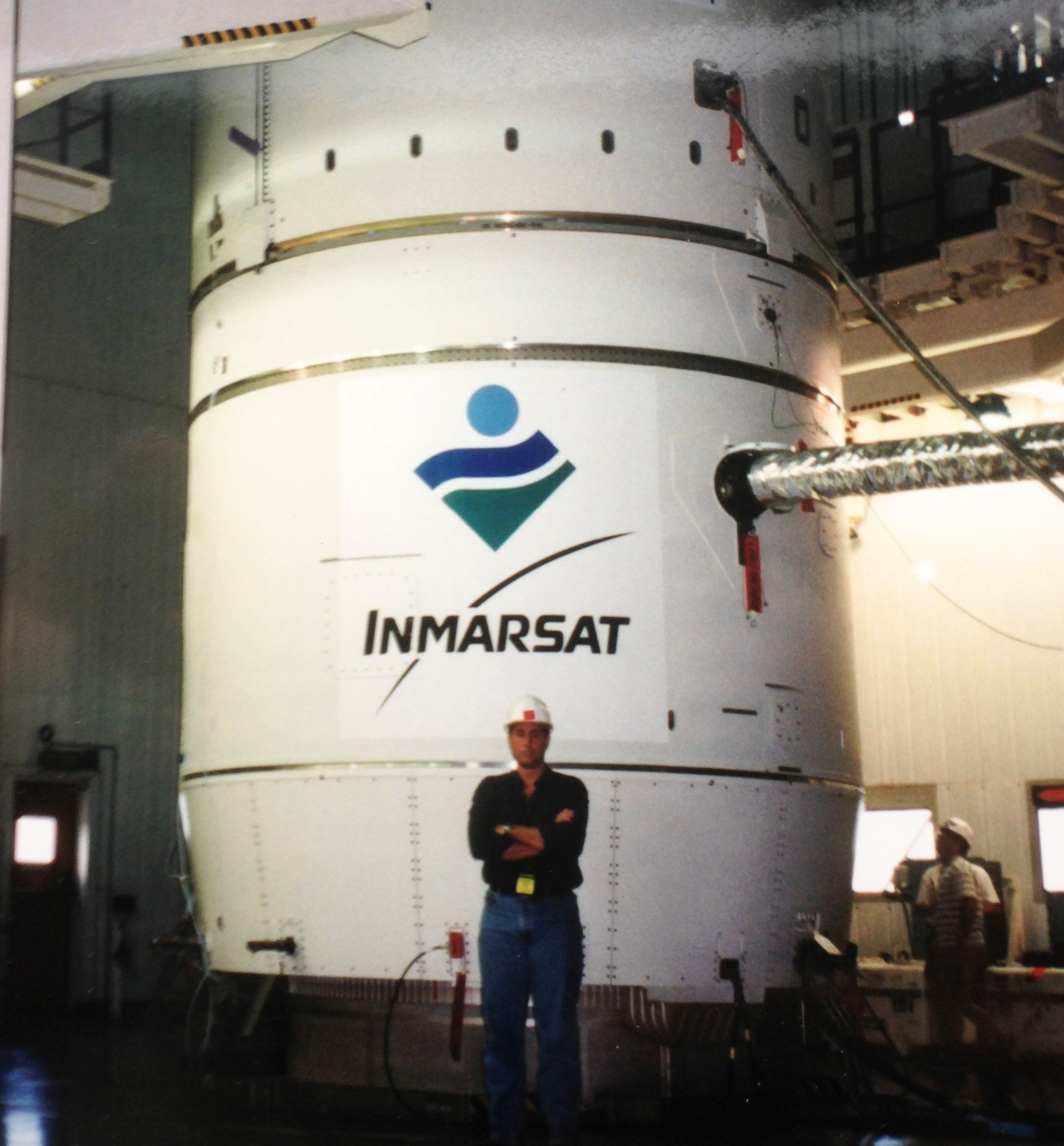
Inmarsat 3 F4 is shown on the launch pad aboard the Ariane 44L launch vehicle, Flight 97. Photo taken on May 30, 1997.

== See also ==
- 1997 in spaceflight
