= SES Broadband =

Two-way satellite broadband Internet service

- Type: Internet service provider
- Industry: Internet
- Predecessor: ASTRA2Connect
- Founded: 2007
- Headquarters: Betzdorf, Luxembourg
- Area served: Worldwide
- Products: Internet service
- Brands: SES Broadband for Maritime
- Parent: SES
- Website: www.ses.com

SES Broadband (previously ASTRA2Connect) is a two-way satellite broadband Internet service available across Europe, which launched in March 2007, and uses the Astra series of geostationary satellites.

SES Broadband is owned and operated by SES Broadband Services, a subsidiary of SES, based in Betzdorf, Luxembourg.

SES Broadband provides high-speed Internet access (at up to 10 Mbit/s) at a flat rate cost to end users, along with Voice over IP, IPTV, and content-on-demand facilities, without any requirement for a landline, cable or terrestrial wireless connection.

Until March 2012, SES Broadband was called 'ASTRA2Connect' and the operating company 'ASTRA Broadband Services'. The name was changed in line with the rebranding of parent company SES.

== Application ==
The SES Broadband service makes broadband Internet access available to homes in rural locations or otherwise beyond the reach of existing terrestrial broadband services. Outside the major European urban centres, there are millions of households currently without broadband access through landlines. and by 2010, up to 6 million, or 3.5%, of the 170 million homes in Western Europe will still be without terrestrial broadband access.

SES Broadband can also be used for transportable broadband Internet access, where the location or its temporary nature prohibits a terrestrial connection, although the equipment requires mains power and cannot be used while actually in motion.

As well as Internet access, SES Broadband is used for dual play (broadband internet and telephony) and triple play (broadband Internet, telephony and TV) services.

An upgrade was introduced in 2008 to enable an SES Broadband dish to be used for simultaneous reception of normal satellite TV from satellites at the Astra 19.2°E or the Astra 28.2°E positions.

=== Industrial Applications ===
Satellite broadband can provide an Internet connection for industrial data acquisition and control applications, where reliability and security are paramount, to ensure a constant data flow. For employment in industrial processes such as electricity generation, water management, refining, oil and natural gas drilling, automatic fabrication, and transportation, where use of SCADA (supervisory control and data acquisition) computer monitoring and control are used, SES Broadband is a solid communications platform.

The industrial implementation of SES Broadband allows for a SCADA network to be realized with an always-on, secure two-way satellite connection to the IP backbone, with a guaranteed bandwidth (and symmetrical download/upload speeds if required) for a flat fee. The network is independent of other terrestrial communications links and can operate from remote sites, and across all of Europe.

== Technology ==
SES Broadband uses a satellite link to carry IP data in both directions between the central hub and remote terminals. At the hub, routers connect to the Internet backbone and IP data is embedded in a DVB-S2 format carrier to be uplinked to the satellite from SES' teleport and, from there, downlinked to the remote terminal where the signal is received with a domestic-type dish for the satellite internet modem, which extracts the IP data for the end user's PC.

The return path is handled in a similar fashion, but with a low power 500 mW transmitter on each terminal dish providing the uplink to the satellite, with multiple-frequency time division multiple access techniques employed to handle many remote terminals simultaneously. SES Broadband combines 2 standards for the return path: Satmode for modulation and coding and DVB-RCS for the access scheme.

The central hub and terminal technology is developed by a Belgian company called Newtec.

SES Broadband uses the Astra 3B communications satellite at the 23.5° east orbital position to handle uplinks and downlinks in both directions. A number of transponders are used for the hub-to-terminal downlink in the satellite TV downlink segment of the Ku band (10.70 GHz-12.75 GHz). The terminal-to-hub uplink to the satellite uses the uplink segment of the Ku band (14.00 GHz-14.50 GHz) and extended Ku band (13.75 GHz-14.25 GHz)

== Marketing ==
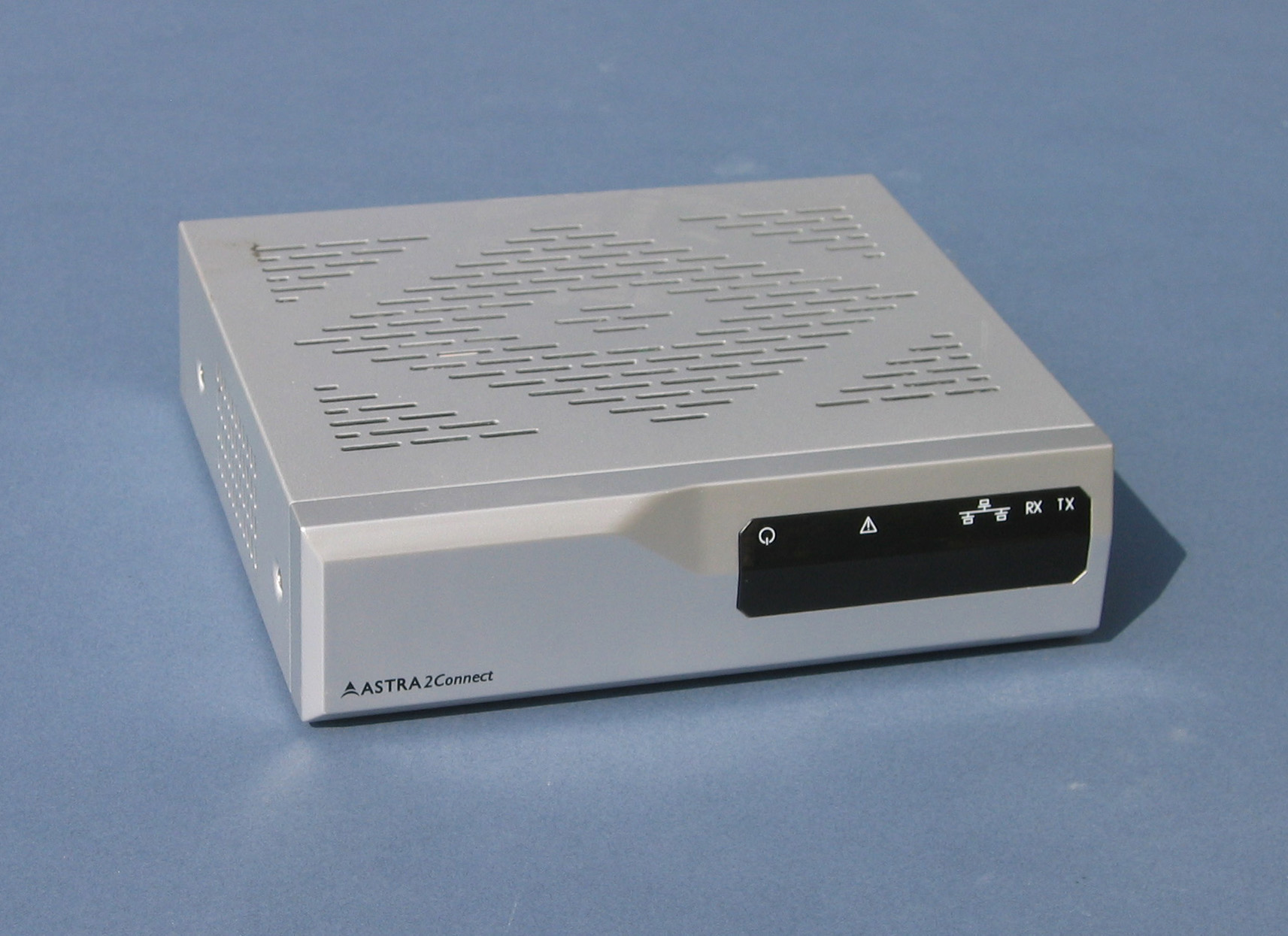
The IPmodem used to connect the iLNB to the user's host PC or local area network

SES Broadband services are sold to residential users by a number of ISPs in partnership with SES. Such partnerships operate either exclusively or in competition within different regions and countries of Europe. Germany was the first country to receive access to SES Broadband (then ASTRA2Connect) services. SES currently has partnerships with ISPs to provide SES Broadband services in Austria, Belgium, the Czech Republic, France, Germany, Ireland, Italy, Netherlands, Poland, Slovakia, Slovenia, Switzerland, Spain and the UK, with partnerships in other countries under negotiation.

The service provider is typically responsible for marketing and selling the SES Broadband service, providing home and business installations, billing, and running a subscriber helpdesk. SES Broadband Services provides the (SES) satellite capacity, a DVB/IP Internet platform, uplink services, Internet backbone connectivity, subscriber activation and monitoring, and technical support for the service provider.

The first service provider in Germany was ISP, Filiago and in the UK, BeyonDSL. In the UK, customers of BeyonDSL purchase the SES Broadband terminal equipment for £300, pay a £50 registration fee and a monthly fee according to the package chosen with one-off allowance extensions available for additional payment:

| Monthly Tariff | Download Bandwidth | Upload Bandwidth | Data Allowance |
|---|---|---|---|
| £15 | 2048 kbit/s | 256 kbit/s | 2 GB |
| £25 | 10240 kbit/s | 256 kbit/s | 4 GB |
| £50 | 10240 kbit/s | 256 kbit/s | 12 GB |

== User equipment ==
Connection to the SES Broadband service is by way of a Sat3Play satellite terminal developed by Newtec in conjunction with the European Space Agency (ESA). The terminal comprises an external satellite dish fitted with a two-way interactive LNB ("iLNB") connected by coaxial cable to the indoor satellite "IP modem" that, in turn, connects to the user's PC or LAN. Assembly of the dish and installation is straightforward and requires only a few basic tools and a simple signal strength meter. The installation is sometimes referred to as Do-It-Yourself (DiY) installation. Detailed instructions for installation are supplied and this can be achieved by any competent end user, without professional help.

The satellite dish is of an offset design with an 80 cm (31 in) diameter solid steel reflector and fitted with an altazimuth mount.

The iLNB combines the feedhorn and electronics for reception and transmission in one unit, and is provided with two F connectors for receive and transmit connection to the IPmodem. The reception (download) section is equivalent to a universal LNB used in a European domestic direct broadcast satellite TV system but provides for reception of one signal polarization only (selection of the correct polarization at installation is obtained by rotating the iLNB within its mount on the dish).

The IPmodem is a small plastic-cased mains powered unit with F connectors for connection to both receive and transmit sections of the iLNB. It requires no software on the end user's PC and connects directly, or via a LAN using a standard 8P8C (RJ-45) Ethernet connector.

The terminal acts as a DHCP server for the computer, and provides LED indicators for power, satellite link alarm, LAN connection, LAN data, satellite signal received and satellite transmission. With the dish aligned correctly on the correct satellite, the IPmodem automatically seeks out the initial receive carrier frequency (10.891 GHz) and establishes a satellite connection.

To enable an SES Broadband dish to be used for normal satellite TV reception, a "Quad LNB and Multifeed Clamp" upgrade can be fitted to the terminal dish. This comprises a replacement clamp for the iLNB onto which fits an additional LNB clamp for either Astra 19.2°E or Astra 28.2°E, fixed at the correct horizontal separation and adjustable vertically (for the user's latitude). A special four-output LNB is supplied, which contains filtering to suppress interference from the iLNB's transmitter.

== Performance ==
SES Broadband provides an always-on connection and German consumer magazine, SatVision declared the SES Broadband (then ASTRA2Connect) speed "Good" with a score of 83.3%, while PC Magazin found "The speed of the data transfer is what you'd expect from 1 Mbit/s access. Our tests rushed through the ether at about 115 Kbyte/s."

What Satellite and Digital TV magazine concluded that the service "provides a reliable speed and quality of connection".

Since these tests, the maximum download speed has been increased and now stands at 10 Mbit/s, with a maximum upload speed of 256 kbit/s which puts SES Broadband on par with practical terrestrial broadband connections.

Potential drawbacks of satellite broadband systems include the lack of security of the download data (which can be received by anyone within the satellite's footprint) and the delay inherent in the connection – as both upload and download data must follow the route from the ground to the satellite (located some 35,785 km (22,236 mi) above the Earth) and back, there is a minimum total delay or latency (depending on the location of the receive site) of about 0.5 seconds.

SES Broadband data transmission features two-way TCP encryption to provide security, and data compression, TCP-acceleration, and HTTP pre-fetching (at the server and subscriber ends) to alleviate the effects of satellite latency.

Digital Fernsehen magazine's tests of SES Broadband (then ASTRA2Connect) found that "two-way connection via satellite is unsuitable for lovers of on-line games. The ping times measured are too long for this application, with values of 578 ms-589 ms". However, PC Magazin's tests found: "The echo (Ping) times were around 650 ms. For large downloads, that is insignificant and while surfing on the Internet, it is easy to accept a half-second 'time to reflect'."

== Maritime Broadband ==
SES Broadband for Maritime was launched in September 2009 to provide satellite internet access for vessels at sea and on inland waterways in the European region. The maritime service is intended for pleasure crafts, fishing and coastal ships, ferries and smaller commercial cargo carriers, operating mainly in the North and Baltic Seas, and the northern Mediterranean. and provides the same always-on high-speed Internet connection for web browsing, VoIP telephone, email, etc.

The SES Broadband for Maritime service uses the same satellite modem, as the land-based solution, but the terminal deployed is a professional 85 cm (33 in) in-motion marine dish with automatic tracking capabilities, housed in a protective radome. This enables the two-way satellite link to be maintained even while the vessel is underway.

The service provider for maritime users across all Europe supplies broadband and the hardware for a fixed monthly subscription.

== Gallery ==
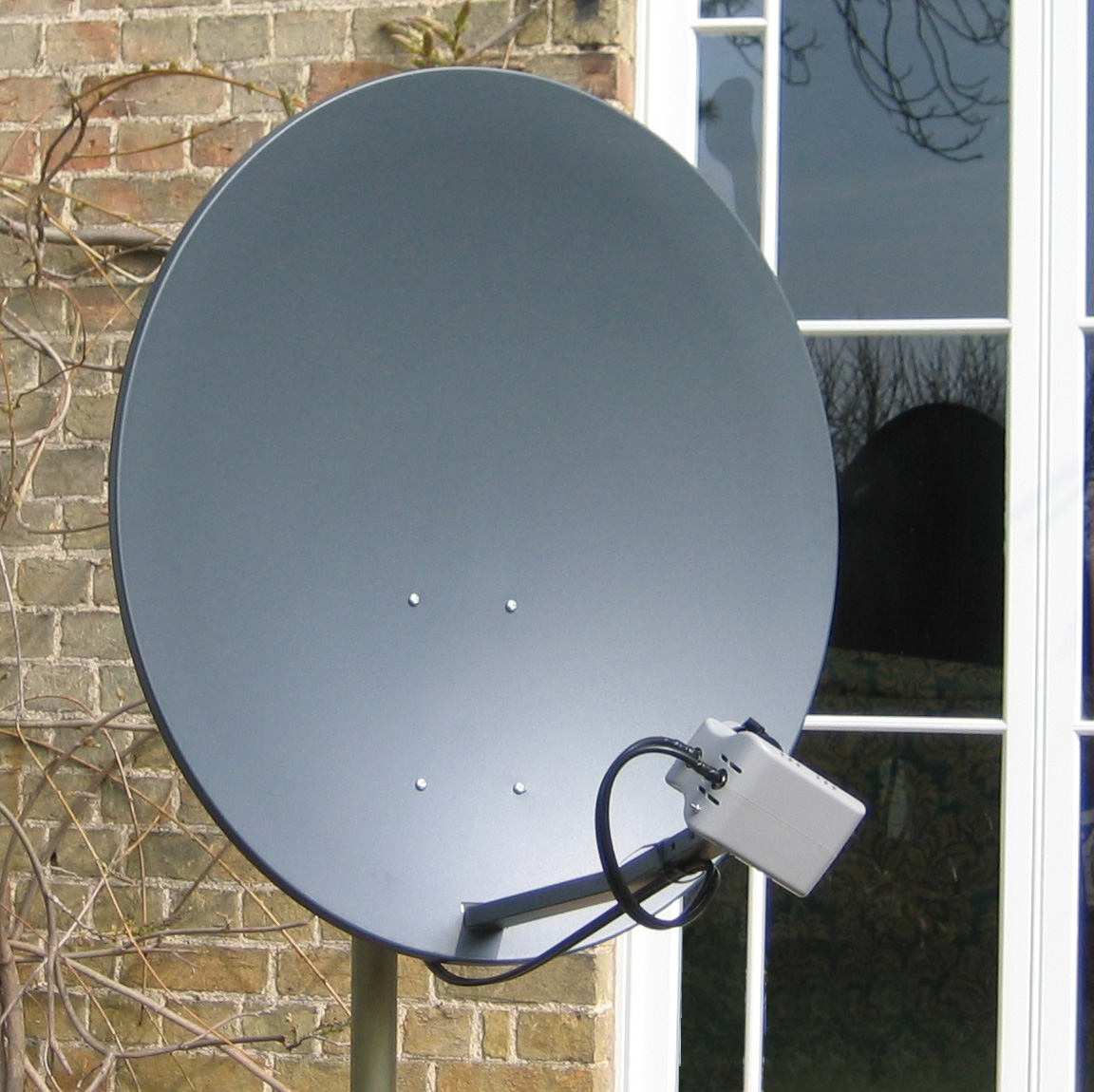
Example of the terminal dish used to access the SES Broadband system in Europe

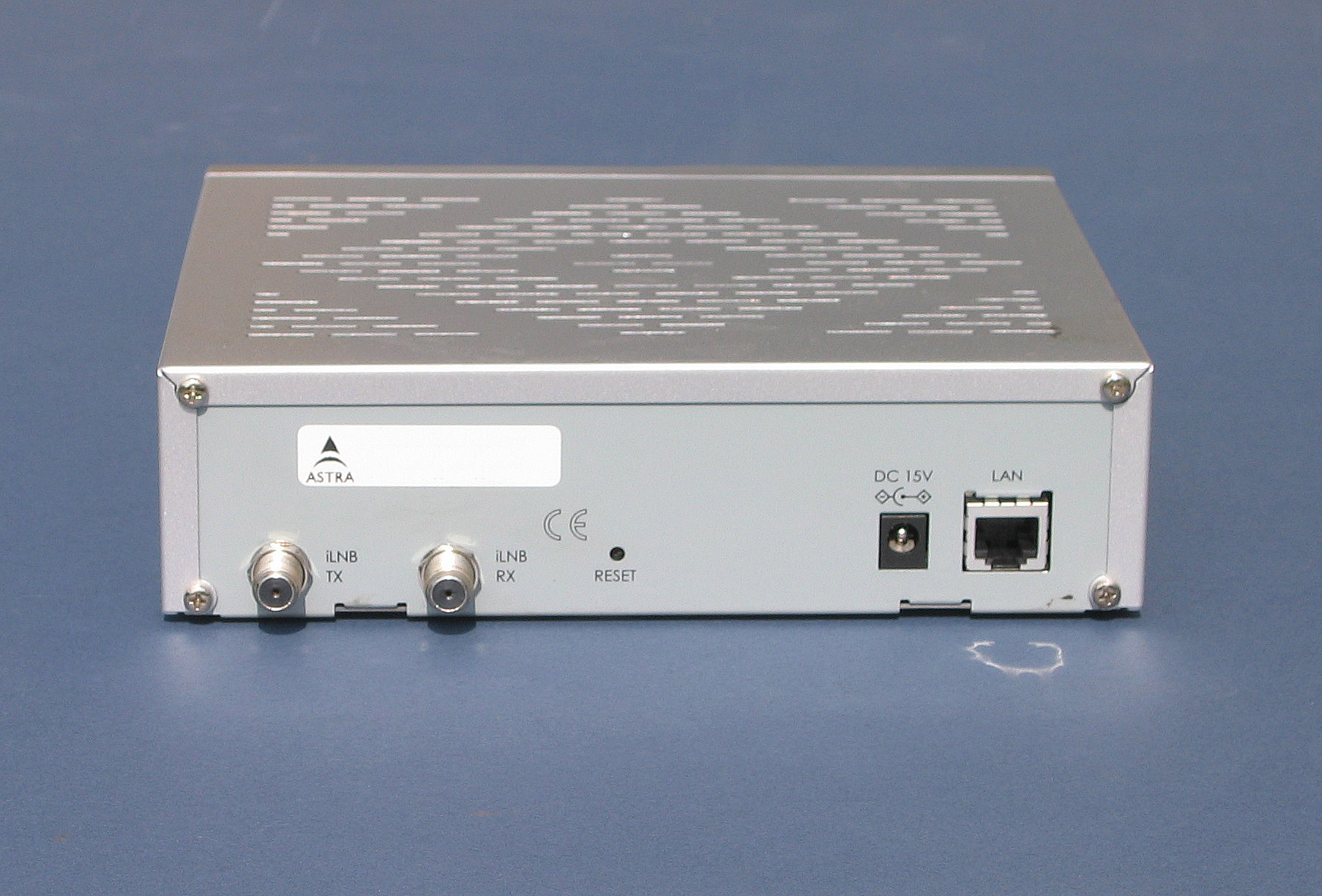
Rear panel of the IPmodem of the SES Broadband satellite broadband system showing the two receive and transmit F connectors and the RJ45 network connection

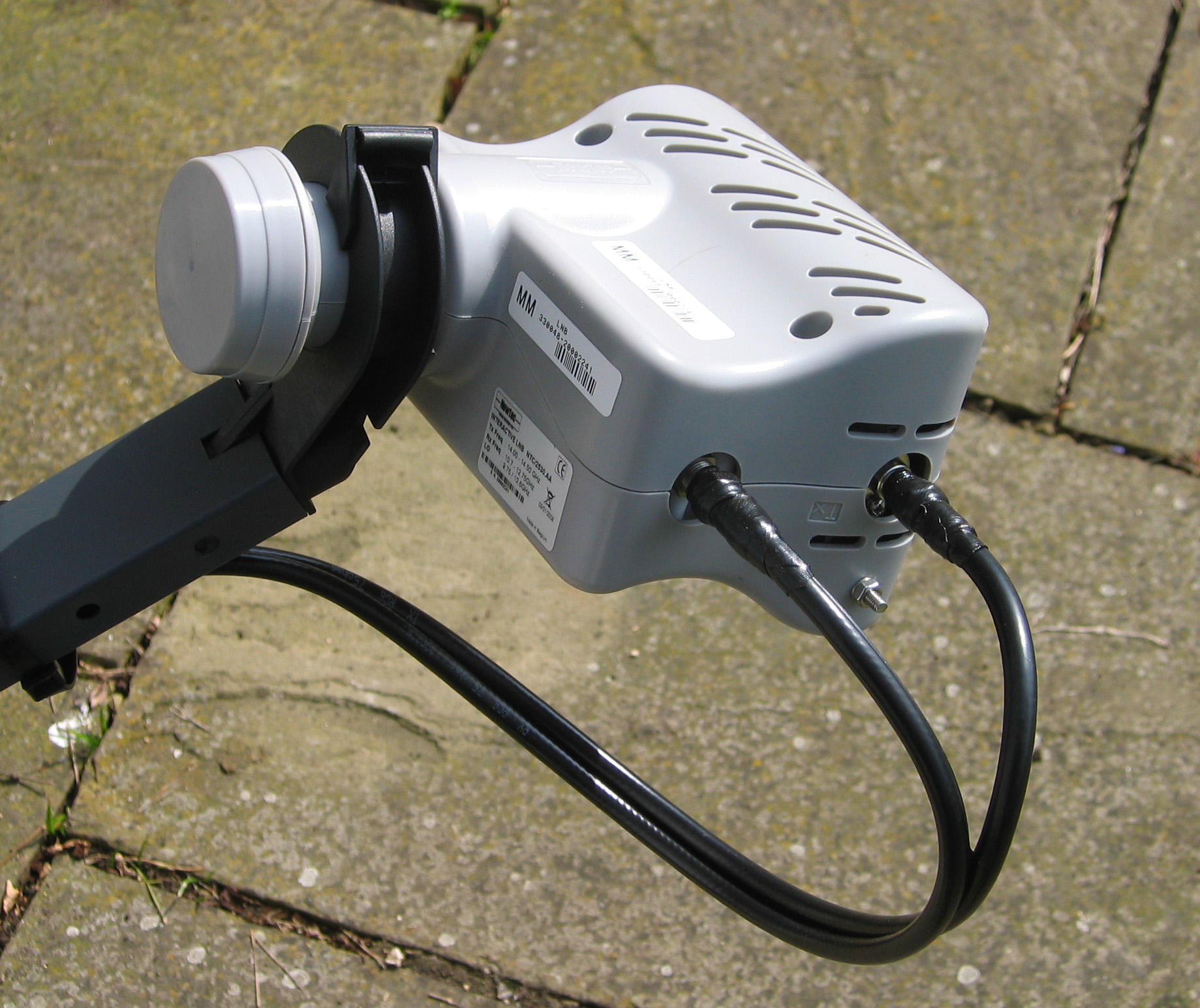
Close up of the receive/transmit iLNB used on the SES Broadband terminal dish

== See also ==
- FleetBroadband marine service by Inmarsat
- Tooway European satellite Internet service by Eutelsat
- HughesNet US satellite Internet service
- StarBand US satellite Internet service
- WildBlue US satellite Internet service by ViaSat
