= SES Broadband for Maritime =

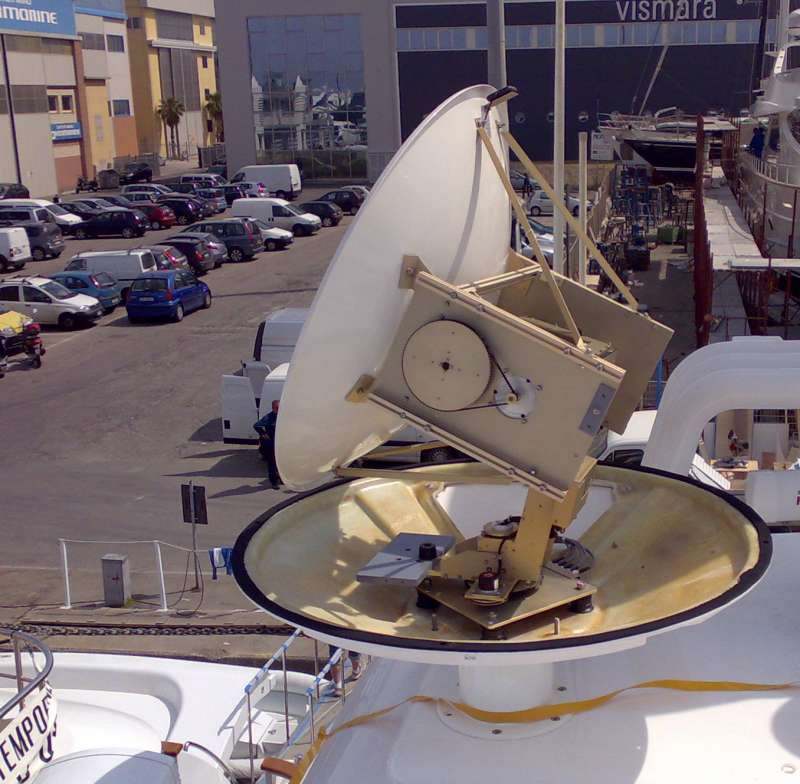
The SES Broadband for Maritime antenna from KNS, shown without its protective radome cover

SES Broadband for Maritime is a two-way satellite broadband Internet service for use on private boats and commercial ships throughout European waters.

SES Broadband for Maritime provides high-speed Internet access (at up to 2 Mbit/s downlink) along with VoIP telephone, email, and virtual private network services to vessels while at anchor/moored or in motion. The service started in September 2009.

The ship-borne service is based on the SES Broadband land-based satellite broadband technology and is operated by SES Broadband Services, a subsidiary of SES based in Betzdorf, Luxembourg, in conjunction with Korean marine antenna manufacturers KNS.

Until March 2012, the service was called ASTRA2Connect Maritime Broadband and the operating company ASTRA Broadband Services. The name was changed in line with the rebranding of parent company SES.

== Uses ==
SES Broadband for Maritime provides an always-on Internet connection to vessels, and the service can be used equally well while a vessel is either docked or underway at sea, to provide users the same connectivity capabilities they have in their homes or offices.

The service is intended for pleasure crafts, fishing and coastal ships, ferries and smaller commercial cargo carriers, operating mainly in the North and Baltic Seas, and the northern Mediterranean. SES Broadband for Maritime coverage is available throughout Europe and so the service may also be used by boats on in-land waterways.

The main alternative to the service is Inmarsat's FleetBroadband service that, although almost global in reach, is based on 3G technologies and limited to a 432 kbit/s download speed.

== Marketing ==
SES Broadband for Maritime is marketed to end users by third party service providers, of which there is currently one for all of Europe – UK-based H2OSatellite. The H2OLitespeed package includes hardware rental and broadband access in a fixed-rate monthly fee, dependent on the speed of connection (512 kbit/s download, 96 kbit/s upload, 1024 kbit/s download, 128 kbit/s upload, and 2048 kbit/s download, 128 kbit/s upload are available).

== Technology ==
The Internet connection provided by SES Broadband for Maritime is a two-way satellite link between the user's vessel and the Astra 3B communications satellite at 23.5° east, which in turn is linked to the SES Broadband Services HQ and teleport located in Betzdorf where a hub connects to the Internet backbone.

Downlinks and uplinks to & from the vessel's antenna comprise IP data embedded in a DVB-S2 carrier using the Ku band (10.70 GHz ~ 12.75 GHz for downlink, 14.00 GHz ~ 14.50 GHz for uplink).

== User Equipment ==
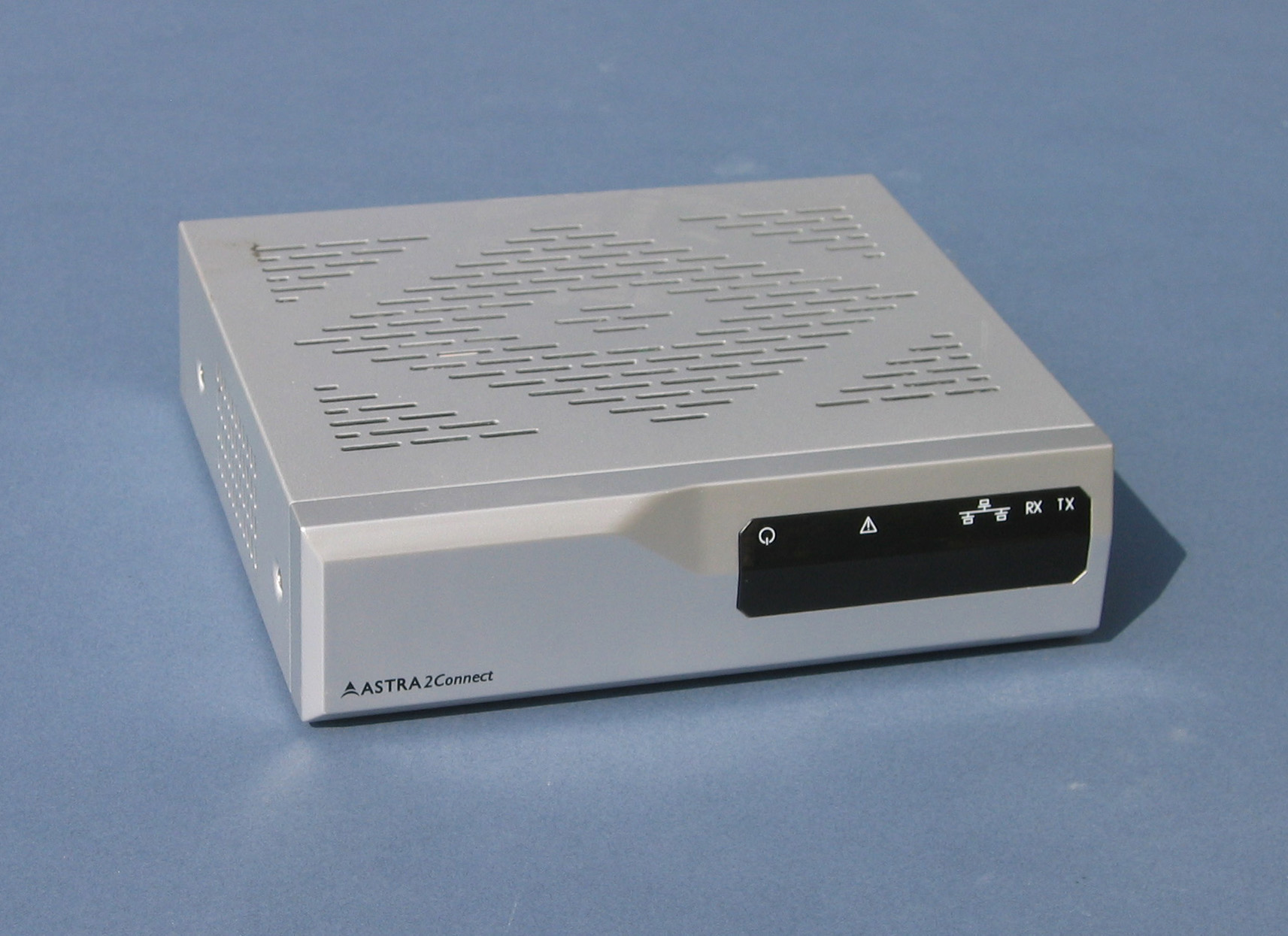
The SES Broadband for Maritime satellite modem from Newtec

Vessels using SES Broadband for Maritime require a simple VSAT terminal comprising an antenna developed by KNS and modem from Newtec. The antenna is an in-motion motorised and stabilised dish for reception and transmission (500 mW), which automatically aligns to the Astra 1E satellite and maintains its orientation (and therefore the IP link to the satellite) even while the vessel is in motion – underway, manoeuvring, rolling or pitching.

SES Broadband for Maritime uses the KNS SuperTrack A9 antenna – an 85 cm dish weighing 57 kg, housed in a 110 cm x 103 cm protective radome – which is mounted on the superstructure and connected to an ACU (Antenna Control Unit) in the control room. Also in the control room, the SES Broadband for Maritime satellite modem connects to the dish's iLNB and to the user's local area network using a standard 8P8C Ethernet connector, behaving as an IP Bridge.

== See also ==
- SES Broadband European land-based satellite Internet
- Inmarsat Marine communications satellites
- FleetBroadband Inmarsat service
