= Marisat 3 =

Geostationary communications satellite

- Mission type: Communications
- Operator: COMSAT→Inmarsat→Intelsat
- COSPAR ID: 1976-101A
- SATCAT no.: 09478
- Mission duration: 32 years

Spacecraft properties
- Spacecraft type: HS-356
- Manufacturer: Hughes
- Launch mass: 665.0 kg (1,466.1 lb)
- BOL mass: 362 kg (798 lb)

Start of mission
- Launch date: October 14, 1976, 22:44 UTC
- Rocket: Delta 2914
- Launch site: Cape Canaveral LC-17A

End of mission
- Deactivated: October 29, 2008

Orbital parameters
- Reference system: Geocentric
- Regime: Geostationary
- Longitude: 33.9° W
- Eccentricity: 0.01748
- Perigee altitude: 35,051 kilometres (21,780 mi)
- Apogee altitude: 36,525 kilometres (22,696 mi)
- Inclination: 2.6°
- Period: 1,436.2 minutes
- Epoch: February 19, 1976

Transponders
- Band: 1 L band, 1 C band and 3 UHF
- Frequency: Uplink: 307.75/254.15 MHz Downlink: 311.15–257.55 MHz

Marisat 3 (or Marisat F3) is a communications satellite operated by COMSAT. Marisat 3 was the second of a series of COMSAT maritime communications satellites.

== Satellite ==
The satellite was operated at orbital position of 176 degrees east from 1976 to 1991. It was transferred to 182° E (178° W) and operated there until 1996. It was transferred to 326.1° E (33.9° W), Over the Atlantic Ocean, and since 1999 has been providing a broadband data link to the US National Antarctic Foundation in Antarctica at the South Pole's Amundsen-Scott research station. The same was transferred to Intelsat in 2004. On Wednesday, October 29, 2008, after 32 years of service, the longest for any commercial satellite to date, was removed from active service. Intelsat engineers used the remaining fuel on board to raise the orbit about 125 miles (200 km) above the geostationary arc and put it into an array orbit.

== Launch ==
Marisat 3 was launched by a Delta rocket from Cape Canaveral Air Force Station, Florida, at 22:44 UTC on October 14, 1976.

== See also ==
- 1976 in spaceflight
