= Marisat 2 =

Communications satellite

- Mission type: Communications
- Operator: COMSAT→Inmarsat
- COSPAR ID: 1976-053A
- SATCAT no.: 08882
- Mission duration: 20 years

Spacecraft properties
- Spacecraft type: HS-356
- Manufacturer: Hughes
- Launch mass: 665.0 kg (1,466.1 lb)
- BOL mass: 362 kg (798 lb)

Start of mission
- Launch date: June 10, 1976, 00:09 UTC
- Rocket: Delta 2914
- Launch site: Cape Canaveral LC-17A

End of mission
- Deactivated: September 1996

Orbital parameters
- Reference system: Geocentric
- Regime: Geostationary
- Longitude: 73° E
- Eccentricity: 0.00022
- Perigee altitude: 35,788 kilometres (22,238 mi)
- Apogee altitude: 35,807 kilometres (22,249 mi)
- Inclination: 2.5°
- Period: 1,436.1 minutes
- Epoch: February 19, 1976

Transponders
- Band: 1 L band, 1 C band and 3 UHF

Marisat 2 (or Marisat F2) is a communications satellite operated by COMSAT. Marisat 2 was the second of a series of COMSAT maritime communications satellites.

== Satellite ==
The spacecraft was capable of transmitting voice, data, facsimile and telex messages to and from ships at sea through special shore stations at Southbury, Connecticut and Saint Paul, CA, which were interconnected with existing domestic terrestrial networks. The system was initially utilized primarily by the U.S. Navy, with a limited amount of satellite capacity provided in different frequency bands (L band), through separate satellite transponders, for maritime communications services to commercial entities and other interested users. At such time as the Navy's requirements terminate (late 1970s) substantial satellite capacity will become available for commercial maritime purposes. Following launch, satellite operation was nominal. It was placed in geosynchronous orbit at 176.5 degrees west and using propulsion FW-5.

== Launch ==
Marisat 2 was launched by a Delta rocket from Cape Canaveral Air Force Station, Florida, at 22:32 UTC on June 10, 1976.

== See also ==
- 1976 in spaceflight
