= Inmarsat-6 F1 =

Geostationary communications satellite

- Names: I6 F1
- Mission type: Communications
- Operator: Inmarsat
- COSPAR ID: 3021-128A
- SATCAT no.: 50319
- Mission duration: 15 years (planned)

Spacecraft properties
- Bus: Eurostar 3000EOR
- Manufacturer: Airbus Defence and Space
- Launch mass: 5,470 kg (12,060 lb)
- Power: 21 kW

Start of mission
- Launch date: 22 December 2021, 15:32 UTC
- Rocket: H-IIA 204 (F45)
- Launch site: Tanegashima, LA-Y1
- Contractor: Mitsubishi Heavy Industries

Orbital parameters
- Reference system: Geocentric orbit
- Regime: Geostationary orbit

Transponders
- Band: L-band (ELERA); Ka-band (Global Xpress)

Inmarsat-6 F1 is a communications satellite to be operated by the British satellite operator Inmarsat and designed and manufactured by Airbus Defence and Space on the Eurostar 3000EOR satellite bus. Part of the Inmarsat-6 satellite fleet, it will be Inmarsat's first dual-payload satellite, with capabilities in both L-band (ELERA) and Ka-band (Global Xpress). Claimed to be the largest and most sophisticated commercial telecommunications satellite ever launched, as the first of two such vehicles, it was placed into supersynchronous transfer orbit on 22 December 2021.

The platform uses electric propulsion for orbit raising in order to reduce the mass compared to traditional systems. The I-6 satellites will be powered by Safran/Snecma PPS-5000 electric propulsion will then raise the satellite into final geosynchronous orbit and will include two deployable solar arrays and batteries. The design life of the I-6F1 will be 15 years.

== Objectives ==
The L-band payload supports Inmarsat's ELERA communication system, while the Ka-band payload augments the Global Xpress constellation. The L-band capabilities will augment the 10 year old I4 satellite L-band communication systems increasing the network bandwidth by four times. The L-band is primarily used for non-government communication of voice calls, messaging, and the Global Maritime Distress and Safety System. The Ka-band can support video and other high data rate web transfers used by commercial and government customers.

== F2 ==
The F2 satellite was launched in February 2023 and suffered a power system failure in orbit. It is not operational and is not expected to become operational.

== See also ==
- Inmarsat
