= MARECS =

Version of European Space Agency communication satellite

Inmarsat MARECS series
- Country/ies of origin: United Kingdom (UK)
- Operator(s): Inmarsat (MARECS-B licensed to Nuovo Telespazio)
- Type: Navigation Satellite
- Status: Decommissioned
- Coverage: Global

Constellation size
- First launch: 20th December 1981
- Last launch: 10th November 1984
- Total launches: 3 (1 launch failure - MARECS-B)

Orbital characteristics
- Orbital height: geosynchronous orbit
- Website: https://www.inmarsat.com/en/index.html

MARECS was a version of the European Space Agency's ECS communications satellite, adapted for maritime communications. It was used by Inmarsat.

MARECS A was launched in 1981 and placed over the Atlantic Ocean. It was deactivated in August 1996.

MARECS B was lost due to launch problems in 1982, while MARECS B2 (also known as MARECS C) was launched in 1984 and placed over the Pacific Ocean. MARECS B2/C was active until 2002.

They were among Europe's first telecommunications satellites.
