= SwiftBroadband =

SwiftBroadband is an IP-based packet-switched communications network that provides a symmetric ‘always-on’ data connection of up to 650 kbit/s per channel for aircraft globally except for the polar regions, using the Inmarsat satellite constellation.

== Details ==
Designed to compete in the business aviation communications market, it has been studied as an approach for Air Traffic Management by Eurocontrol (the pan-European air traffic management organization).

In Standard IP mode, the service is shared with other concurrent users of the system, providing a ‘best effort’ service. SwiftBroadband can also provide a pre-determined quality of service through Streaming mode. There are 200 spot beams per satellite with each beam supporting up to 90 channels of 432 kbit/s. Three satellites cover the entire globe with the exception of the polar regions.

For Standard IP service, the throughput that an end-user experiences depends on the load on the channel as well as other factors such as antenna type and data compression. Traffic prioritization is available through Flightstream SA to make sure high priority data reaches the Satcom terminal even in situations where 100% of the allocated downstream network bandwidth is being used.

SwiftBroadband uses the narrow spot beams of the Inmarsat-4 (I-4) satellites. Features of the service include: Standard IP data – currently up to two channels per aircraft; Up to 432 kbit/s per channel over a high-gain antenna and up to 332 kbit/s over an intermediate gain antenna Streaming IP data on demand at 32, 64, 128, 256, 384, and 650 kbit/s which can be combined for higher rates; simultaneous voice and high-speed data; packet-switched data (TCP/IP) and ISDN; circuit-switched voice and VoIP.

== SwiftBroadband High Data Rate (HDR) ==
In October 2013 Inmarsat announced the launch of its new SwiftBroadband High Data Rate (HDR) streaming service for the aviation market which provides a guaranteed bandwidth (QoS) of est. 650 kbit/s. It further supports four new streaming rates – including asymmetric services:

- Asymmetrical (650 kbit/s up / 64 kbit/s down)
- Symmetrical – or premium (650 kbit/s up/down)
- Half-channel (325 kbit/s)

== Terminals ==
SwiftBroadband avionics are offered by:

- Cobham Antenna Systems (Chelton Satcom),
- Cobham Satcom(avionics and antennas),
- Esterline/CMC (antennas),
- EMS Technologies (avionics and antennas),
- Honeywell (avionics),
- Rockwell Collins (avionics),
- TECOM Industries (antennas),
- Thales (avionics),
- Thrane & Thrane (avionics).

== Service ==
In addition to installation of User Terminal avionics, aircraft operators contract with an Inmarsat service provider to provision access to the network. The service provider allows access to the I-4 constellation and charges either for the volume of data used for standard IP, or based on the time used for streaming IP and voice calls. Service providers such as AirSatOne offer customized solutions and packages targeting the specific needs of aircraft operators and their passengers, enhanced services such as compression, optimization and acceleration are available for Swiftbroadband.

Flightstream AOC & Flightstream SA are enhanced services for SwiftBroadband systems designed to enhance aircraft SatCom internet systems.

Flightstream SA service enables basic compression techniques by compressing text and images at selectable levels and enables advanced customizable firewall and content filtering features which allow aircraft operators to block access to costly high-bandwidth websites such as YouTube, in addition to selected media content types such as flash, videos and images permitting aircraft operators to take control of the content allowed on board their aircraft. The service does not require the installation of hardware on the aircraft or software on individual's computers or mobile devices. Settings can be changed to a single aircraft or the entire fleet through an on-line portal without having to gain access to the aircraft.

Flightstream AOC service incorporates a number of technologies to reduce the data usage by up to 80% over the satellite network and provides a better overall experience (faster page loads) for the end user by utilizing advanced acceleration, optimization and compression designed to account for latency and packet shaping considerations specific to satellite communications. By using these techniques data can be delivered to and from the aircraft with a much smaller footprint. The service also provides a billing solution for aircraft operators which allow charter, fractional and commercial carriers the option to bill individual users for Wi-Fi access and airtime creating and additional revenue stream. Flightstream AOC uses ground servers to compress and format data then re-formats the data in the Flightstream AOC AvSat router installed on board the aircraft for use on laptops and mobile devices. The specialized AvSat router has 7 GB of memory to store web pages in its web cache which eliminates redundant HTTP requests and delivers web content directly from the unit speeding up page load times and ever further reducing the amount of SatCom data used. To ensure passengers always have access to current web content the unit will check web page headers, using a small amount of SatCom data, to make sure the stored page is up to date, if the device detects an updated web site it will download the current web page, store it and memory and deliver the latest content to passengers on board the aircraft.

== See also ==
- Inmarsat
- BGAN
- Fleet Broadband
