= Vizada =

Worldwide satellite communications service

Vizada Group
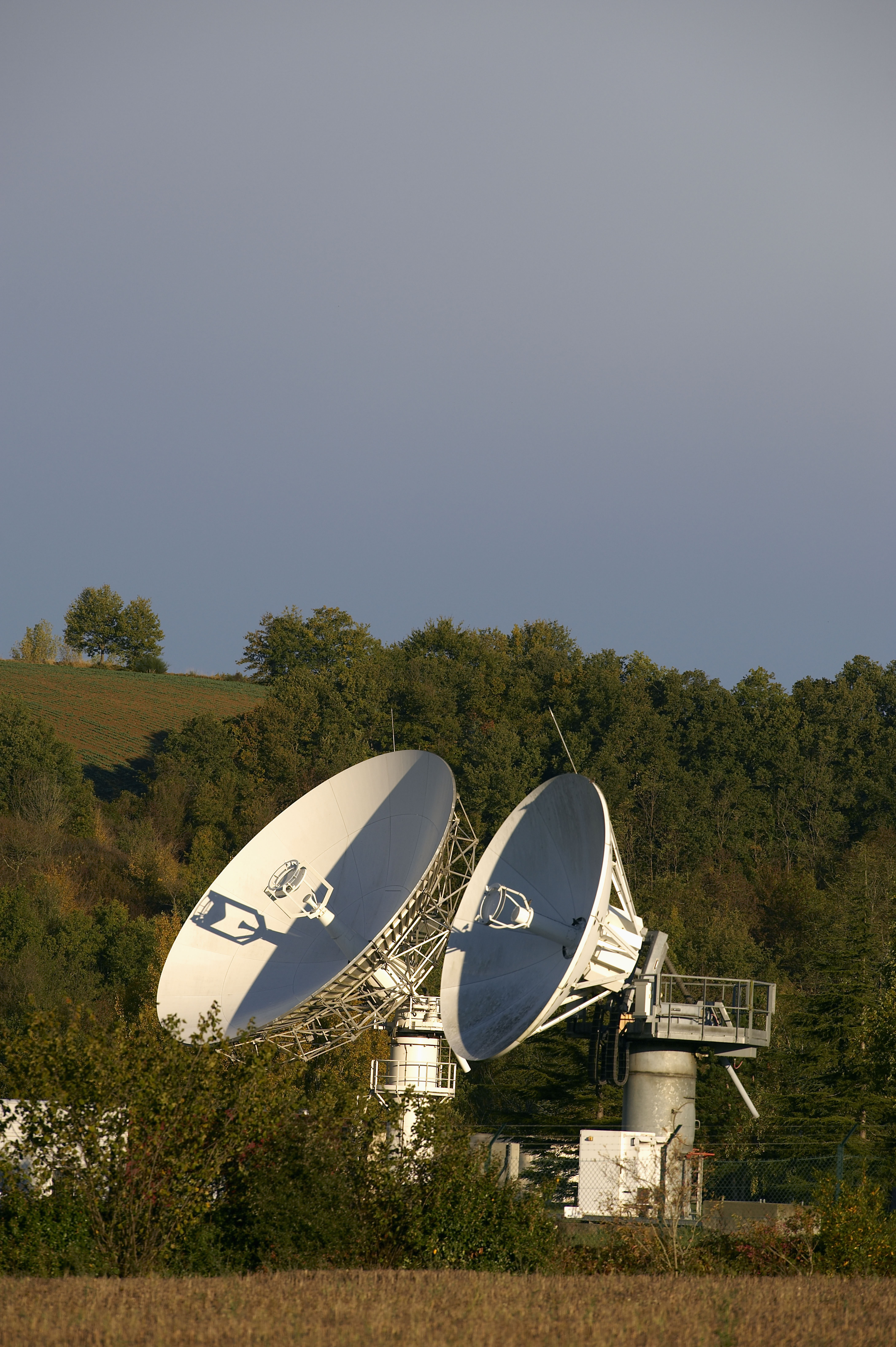
- Satellite reception antennas at Vizada's Land Earth Station located in Aussaguel, France.
- Company type: Private Company
- Industry: Communications satellite operators
- Predecessor: France Telecom and Telenor
- Fate: defunct
- Successor: EADS Astrium
- Headquarters: Paris, France
- Area served: Worldwide
- Products: Mobile and fixed satellite services
- Owner: Apax Partners
- Subsidiaries: Vizada, Vizada Networks, Marlink

Vizada was a Norwegian firm and later subsidiary brand of EADS and Marlink providing satellite communications services. It operated stations that connected satellite communications to terrestrial telecommunications and IP networks. Vizada's services covered maritime, land, and aeronautical services. In 2011, the Vizada Group was acquired by EADS and integrated as a subsidiary of Astrium.

== History ==
Vizada was formed in 2007 when private equity firm Apax Partners acquired France Telecom Mobile Satellite Communications (FTMSC - a division of France Telecom) and Telenor Satellite Services (a division of Telenor) and merged their operations. Apax sold Vizada to EADS for 673 million euros in 2011. EADS would go on to merge Vizada with EADS Astrium, its space subsidiary.

While operative as a firm, Vizada acquired and reorganized several global telecommunications entities including FTMSC and Telenor Satellite Services, as well as vertically specialized companies such as Sait Communications and TDCom. At the time of its acquisition by EADS in 2011, Vizada provided both mobile and fixed satellite telecommunications to markets including merchant shipping, defense and government, fishing and yachting, oil and gas, mining, and non-governmental organizations.

In 1998, one of Vizada's precursor firms entered into partnership with the Télécoms sans frontières (TSF), which was renewed in 2010.

In 2016 an EADS subsidiary, reorganized and renamed as Airbus Defense and Space, consolidated several products including Vizada under the brand name Marlink. Airbus Defense and Space then sold its Marlink business and services back to Apax Partners for an undisclosed sum. As of 2024, Marlink no longer uses the brand name Vizada in any of its products or services.

== Vizada Group ==
While it existed as an independent firm, Vizada operated as The Vizada Group with three subsidiaries:

- Vizada marketed global mobile and fixed satellite communications, partnering with network providers in the industry including Inmarsat, Iridium, Thuraya, Eutelsat, Intelsat, Loral, SES World Skies, and SES Americom.
- Vizada Networks specialized in fixed satellite and hybrid network solutions, operating out of Oslo and Holmestrand in Norway. Vizada Networks partnered with major fixed satellite operators including Eutelsat, Intelsat, and SES World Skies. Vizada Networks had been rebranded from Taide Network, a formerly Telenor product, in 2008.
- Marlink focused on maritime satellite communication.

== See also ==
- VSAT
