= Satmode =

SATMODE is a set of technologies originally developed for interactive TV and based on an always-on return channel via satellite designed for ultra low-cost feasibility.

Although no SATMODE network has been deployed up to now for interactive TV, the SATMODE technology is used in the ASTRA2Connect two-way satellite broadband Internet service available across Europe.

== Purpose of the technology ==
SATMODE is an interactive TV solution via satellite, targeting the mass-market through consumer products.

SATMODE supports services to the viewer, like the following ones:

- interactive advertising
- Betting
- Communication: Chat, SMS, e-mail
- Tele-Voting, Polls, Play-along, Quiz
- Games: standalone or multiplayer
- Home Shopping
- Personal Data Consultation / banking
- Walled Garden Internet Services

SATMODE also supports features allowing the technical management of the iTV platform:

- Enhanced conditional access
- Audience metering
- Statistics gathering
- Hard disk drive content management

The system is scalable up to the complete DTH population and is designed to minimize the terminal cost.

== Modem Layer ==
The modem layer is specified by a CENELEC standard (EN50478).

The system flexibility allows SATMODE to be used in extreme scenarios by adjusting the modem parameters:

- Very power limited scenarios (it’s the case for most VSAT Ku-band satellites)
- Aggressive multi-beam satellite space segment allowing to increase the return channel speed for a given translit power

To reach the flexibility goal and nevertheless keep full interoperatibility of terminals, SATMODE uses a fully specified waveform toolbox.

The choice of constant envelope modulations is made to minimize the terminal cost. Thanks to this property, very low cost outdoor units (ODUs) operating at full saturation and in non-linear mode can be used.

Moderate bit rates allow to use very low power transmitters (typically 100 mW), keeping the cost compatible with the mass-market.

The building blocks of the SATMODE toolbox are:

- Binary or quaternary CPM
- Programmable phase filter for CPM modulations (GMSK being a specific case)
- Flexible Turbo or Turbo-like
- Programmable interleavers (3)
- Programmable constituent codes with bypass possibilities (2)
- Programmable Unique Word structure
- Tables extraction from a DVB TS (DVB-S or DVB-S2 broadcast)

All the parameters are sent by the HUB through DVB tables, even allowing changes during operation:

- FCT: Sprectrum organisation in Carrier Groups
- FAT: Spectrum Allocation to services

Signalisation information sent to specific terminals is also embedded in DVB tables (SMT tables).

The terminal is fully defined: it must be able to play the complete waveform space. The HUB is in the ground station. The HUB usually only implements one scheme and sends the tables to the terminals to instruct them to play that scheme.

== SATMODE Project ==
The SATMODE development project has been funded at 50% by ESA.
