= European Aviation Network =

Aviation telecommunication network

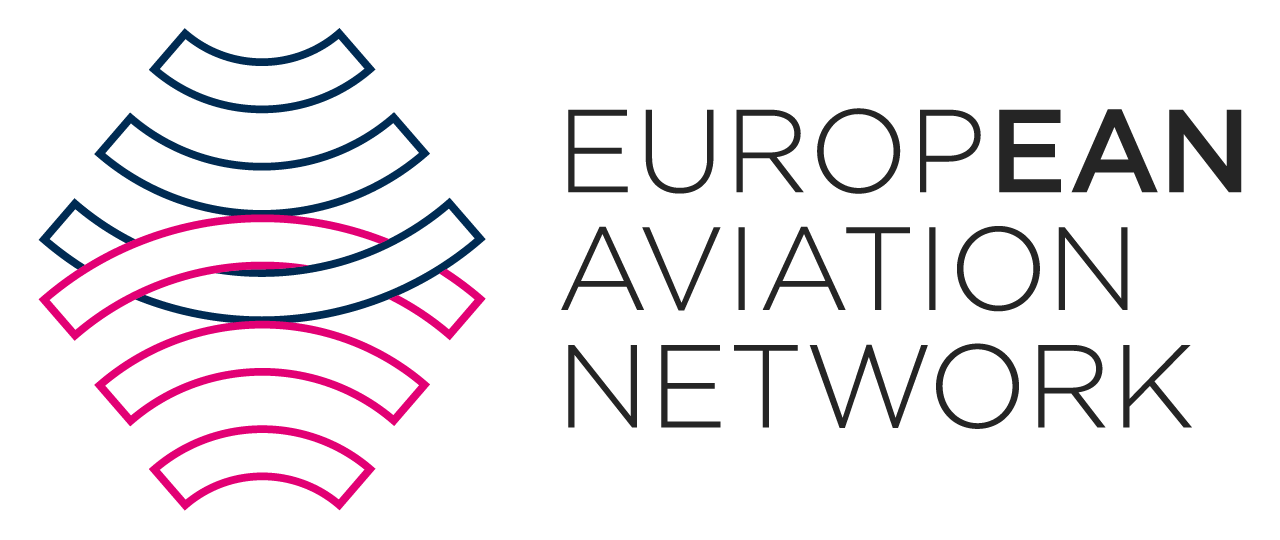
- Type: Joint venture
- Industry: Telecommunications Aviation Technology
- Area served: Europe
- Parent: Deutsche Telekom AG; Inmarsat
- Website: inflight.telekom.net www.europeanaviationnetwork.com

The European Aviation Network is a hybrid mobile phone network built by Deutsche Telekom and Inmarsat in cooperation with their technological partner Nokia. It is used as a backhaul for in-flight WiFi for domestic flights within Europe and contains a LTE ground network supported by a satellite connection. Because of the LTE technology the network can achieve data rates up to 75 Mbit/s downstream and 20 Mbit/s upstream per airplane, with a total capacity of 50 Gbps.

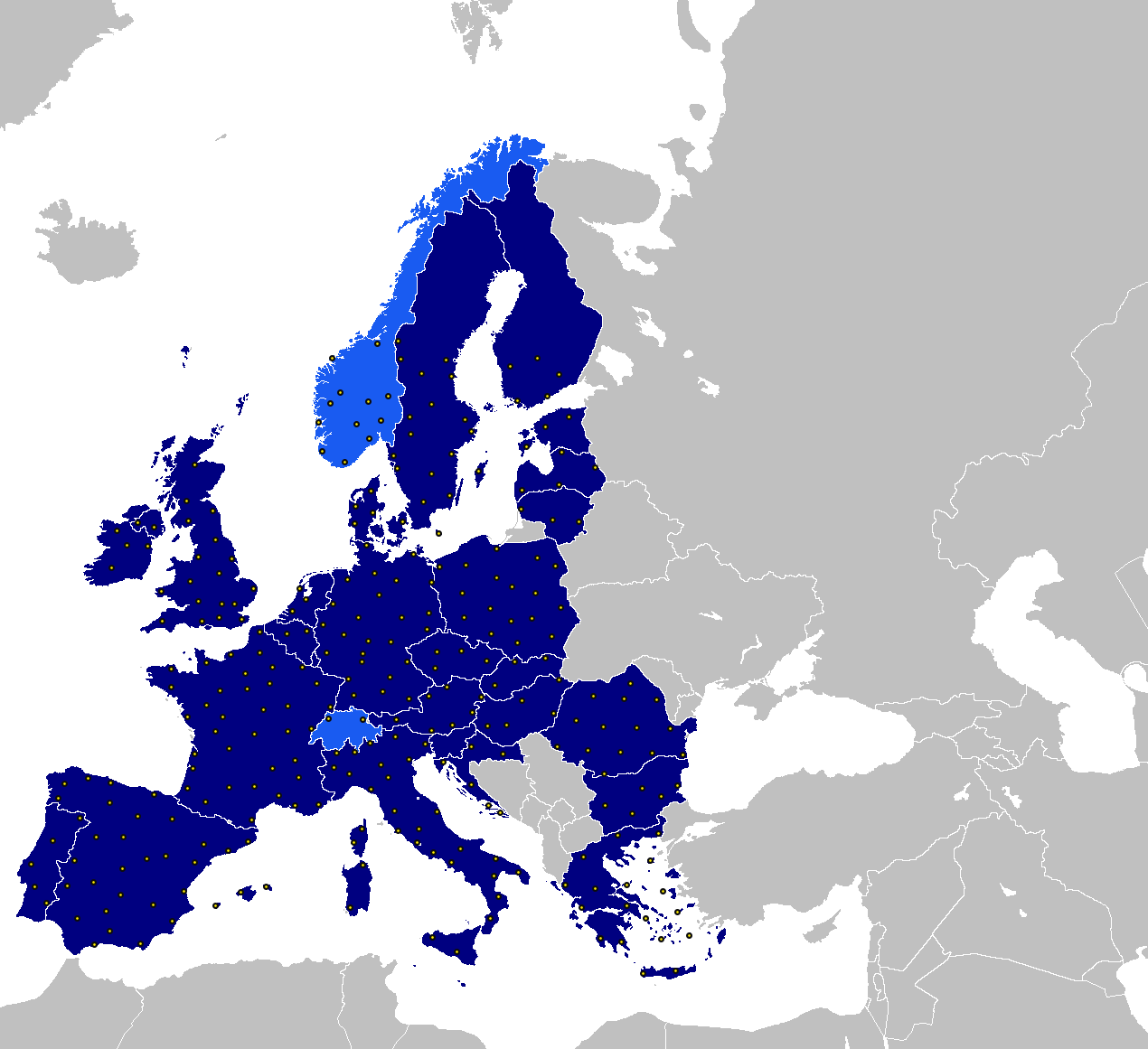
Locations of the cell sites across Europe

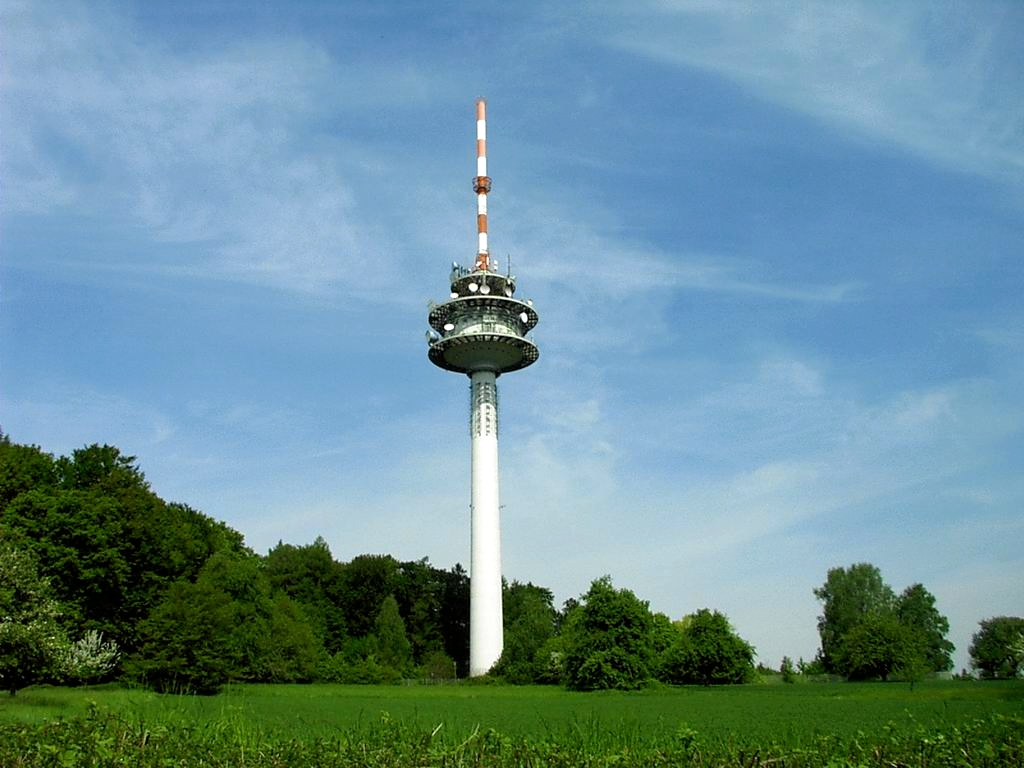
Typenturm with an EAN cell site

== History ==
The European Aviation Network was first announced in 2015 by Deutsche Telekom and Inmarsat. At this point, the technological partner was still unknown. In 2017, Inmarsat launched the satellite for the network with an Ariane 5 rocket into the orbit and began shortly after with the testing. In January 2018 the three companies announced the commercial launch with the International Airlines Group as launch partner. However, in 2025 IAG announced they would be moving more than 500 aircraft to Starlink.

== Technology ==
The ground network contains 300 LTE cell sites, which are spread across the 27 member states of the European Union, Switzerland, United Kingdom and Norway. The custom EAN technology is adapted to the usage with aircraft, supporting ground speeds up to 1,200 km/h - way above the 500 km/h supported by LTE - and a maximum flight level (User height) of 12 km and the cell radius of up to 75 km. The remote radio heads inside the aircraft have been modified to compensate the frequency shift caused by the Doppler effect.

If the ground network is not available, e.g. over the sea, a satellite back-up takes over the connection. The aircraft are equipped with antennas on top (for the satellite connection) and at the bottom (for the EAN ground connection) of their fuselage in order to support the network. Deutsche Telekom uses LTE frequency band 65 (2,100 MHz) for their ground network and Inmarsat the S band satellite spectrum over Europe. The LTE network is completely independent and not linked with the national cell phone networks operated by DT group. It’s the first and only pan-European LTE network.

The network uses the MCC/MNC tuple 901-53 assigned by the ITU to Deutsche Telekom.

== Adoption ==
Airlines that already support the EAN on some aircraft:

- Aegean Airlines
- Aer Lingus (IAG)
- British Airways (IAG)
- Iberia (IAG)
- Lufthansa
- Vueling (IAG)
