= Inmarsat-4 F1 =

Geosynchronous communications satellite

- Operator: Inmarsat
- COSPAR ID: 2005-009A
- SATCAT no.: 28628

Spacecraft properties
- Bus: Eurostar E3000
- Manufacturer: EADS Astrium
- Launch mass: 5,959 kilograms (13,137 lb)

Start of mission
- Launch date: 11 March 2005
- Rocket: Atlas V
- Launch site: Cape Canaveral Space Launch Complex 41

Inmarsat-4 F1 is a communications I-4 satellite operated by the British satellite operator Inmarsat. It was launched into a geosynchronous orbit at 21:42 GMT on 11 March 2005 from Space Launch Complex 41 at Cape Canaveral, Florida, onboard an Atlas V in the 431 configuration. It is currently located at 143.5 degrees East.

Inmarsat-4 F1 was constructed by EADS Astrium, using a Eurostar E3000 bus. It has a mass of 5959 kg and is expected to operate for 13 years

On 17 February 2018 Inmarsat-4 F1 experienced outage due to loss of attitude control.

On 17 April 2023 Inmarsat-4 F1 suffered a partial loss of power from one of its solar arrays, resulting in an "extended outage" which affected all services provided by the satellite. I-4 F1's payload was brought back online by April 18.
