= Inmarsat-4A F4 =

Geostationary communications satellite

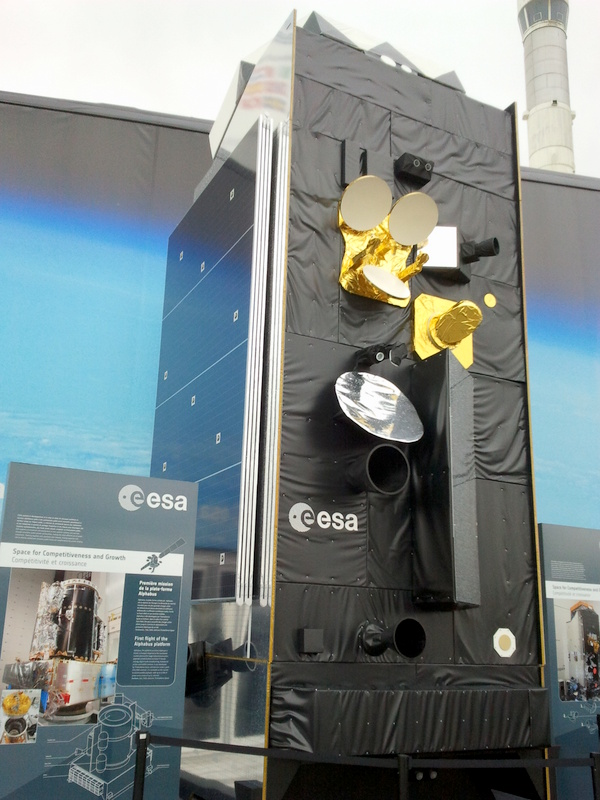
- Full scale mockup Alphasat at Le Bourget Airshow 2013
- Mission type: Communications; Technology
- Operator: Inmarsat; European Space Agency
- COSPAR ID: 2013-038A
- SATCAT no.: 39215
- Mission duration: Planned: 15 years Elapsed: 11 years, 8 months

Spacecraft properties
- Bus: Alphabus
- Manufacturer: EADS Astrium; Thales Alenia Space
- Launch mass: 6,649 kilograms (14,659 lb)

Start of mission
- Launch date: 25 July 2013, 19:54:07 UTC
- Rocket: Ariane 5ECA VA-214
- Launch site: Kourou ELA-3
- Contractor: Arianespace

Orbital parameters
- Reference system: Geocentric
- Regime: Geostationary
- Longitude: 25° east
- Perigee altitude: 35,771 kilometres (22,227 mi)
- Apogee altitude: 35,801 kilometres (22,246 mi)
- Inclination: 0.14 degrees
- Period: 23.92 hours
- Epoch: 29 October 2013, 17:07:36 UTC

Inmarsat-4A F4, also known as Alphasat and Inmarsat-XL, is a large geostationary communications I-4 satellite operated by United Kingdom-based Inmarsat in partnership with the European Space Agency. Launched in 2013, it is used to provide mobile communications to Africa and parts of Europe and Asia.

Inmarsat-4A F4 has been constructed by EADS Astrium and Thales Alenia Space based on the Alphabus satellite bus. It was the first Alphabus spacecraft to be launched, and as such it carries several experimental communications systems in addition to its commercial payload. The spacecraft had a launch mass of 6,649 kilograms (14,659 lb), and is expected to operate for at least fifteen years.

Arianespace had been contracted to launch Inmarsat-4A F4, with an Ariane 5ECA rocket, flight number VA-214, delivering it and INSAT-3D into geosynchronous transfer orbit. The rocket lifted off from ELA-3 at Kourou at 19:54:07 UTC on 25 July 2013, with Inmarsat-4A F4 separating from the rocket around 27 minutes later.

The spacecraft operates in a geostationary orbit at a longitude of 25 degrees east. As of 29 October 2013, it is in an orbit with a perigee of 35,771 kilometres (22,227 mi), an apogee of 35,771 kilometres (22,227 mi) and 0.14 degrees inclination to the equator. The orbit had a semimajor axis of 42,157.20 kilometres (26,195.27 mi) and eccentricity of 0.0003552, giving it an orbital period of 1,435.75 minutes, or 23.92 hours.

== European Data Relay System test ==
The satellite was used as part of an in-orbit verification of the ESA European Data Relay System. In 2014, data from the Sentinel-1A satellite in LEO was transmitted via an optical link to the Alphasat in GEO and then relayed to a ground station using a Ka band downlink. The new system can offer speeds up to 7.2 Gbit/s in the future.
