= FleetBroadband =

FleetBroadband is maritime satellite internet, telephony, SMS texting, and ISDN network for ocean-going vessels using portable domed terminal antennas.

These antennas and corresponding indoor controllers are used to connect phones and laptop computers from sailing vessels to the Internet. All antennas require line-of-sight (LOS) to one of three geosynchronous orbit satellites, thus allowing the terminal to be used on land as well.

== Details ==
The FleetBroadband network was developed by Inmarsat and is composed of three geosynchronous orbiting satellites known as I-4s that allow contiguous global coverage, except for the poles. FleetBroadband systems installed on vessels may travel from ocean to ocean without human interaction. Line-of-sight to the I-4 satellites is required for connectivity, which can be achieved even in rough rolling seas. Since the FleetBroadband network uses the L band, it is more resistant to rain fade than VSAT K_{u} band or C Band systems.

The FleetBroadband service was modeled after terrestrial Internet services where IP (Internet Protocol)-based traffic dominated over ISDN and other earlier communication protocols.

== Terminals ==
There are three-terminal antenna types available: The FB150 antenna (291 × 275 mm), commercially launched in 2009, is capable of 150 kbit/s, the FB250 antenna (329 × 276 mm) is capable of 284 kbit/s, the FB500 antenna (605 × 630 mm) capable of up to 432 kbit/s. The latter two commercially launched in 2007. Current manufacturers of FleetBroadband systems include Thrane & Thrane (Sailor Systems), Wideye (Skipper), KVH, and JRC.

== See also ==
- SES Broadband for Maritime
- Stratos Global Corporation, makers of AmosConnect
