= Inmarsat =

British satellite communications company

Inmarsat Global Ltd.
- Type: Subsidiary
- Industry: Satellite communication
- Founded: 1979; 47 years ago
- Headquarters: London, England
- Key people: Andrew Sukawaty (Chairperson); Rajeev Suri (CEO)
- Revenue: US$1,465.2 million (2018)
- Operating income: US$288.7 million (2018)
- Net income: US$125.0 million (2018)
- Number of employees: 1,500 (2019)
- Parent: Viasat
- Website: www.inmarsat.com

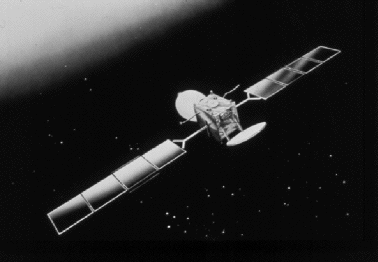
Inmarsat-3 satellite

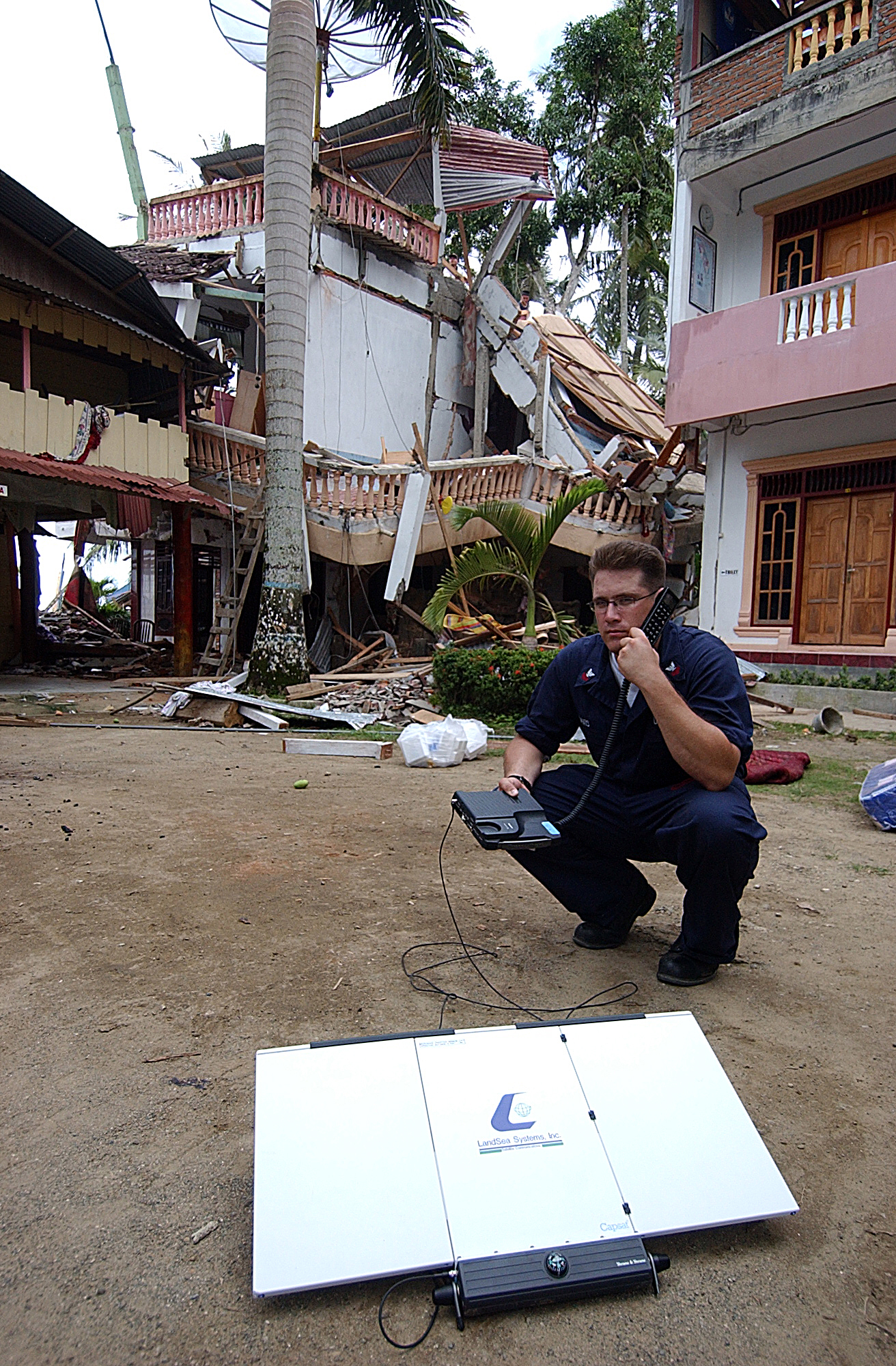
Inmarsat satellite telephone in use after a natural disaster in Nias, Indonesia. The unit depicted was manufactured by Thrane & Thrane A/S of Denmark. (April 2005)

Inmarsat is a British satellite telecommunications company, offering mobile services to most of the globe. It provides telephone and data services via portable or mobile terminals which communicate with ground stations through fifteen geostationary telecommunications satellites.

Inmarsat's network provides communications services to a range of governments, aid agencies, media outlets and businesses (especially in the shipping, airline and mining industries) with a need to communicate in remote regions or where there is no reliable terrestrial network. The company was listed on the London Stock Exchange until it was acquired by Connect Bidco, a consortium consisting of Apax Partners, Warburg Pincus, the CPP Investment Board and the Ontario Teachers' Pension Plan, in December 2019.

In November 2021, Inmarsat's owners and Viasat announced the purchase of Inmarsat by Viasat. The acquisition was completed in May 2023.

== History ==
=== Origins ===
The present company originates from the International Maritime Satellite Organization (INMARSAT), a non-profit intergovernmental organisation established in 1979 at the behest of the International Maritime Organization (IMO)—the United Nations maritime body—and pursuant to the Convention on the International Maritime Satellite Organization, signed by 28 countries in 1976. The organisation was created to establish and operate a satellite communications network for the maritime community.

In coordination with the International Civil Aviation Organization in the 1980s, the convention governing INMARSAT was amended to include improvements to aeronautical communications, notably for public safety. The member states owned varying shares of the operational business. The main offices were originally located at Euston Tower, Euston Road, London.

=== Privatization ===
In the mid-1990s, many member states were unwilling to invest in improvements to INMARSAT's network, especially owing to the competitive nature of the satellite communications industry, while many recognised the need to maintain the organisation's older systems and the need for an intergovernmental organisation to oversee public safety aspects of satellite communication networks. In 1998, an agreement was reached to modify INMARSAT's mission as an intergovernmental organisation and separate and privatise the organisation's operational business, with public safety obligations attached to the sale.

In April 1999 INMARSAT was succeeded by the International Mobile Satellite Organization (IMSO) as an intergovernmental regulatory body for satellite communications, while INMARSAT's operational unit was separated and became the UK-based company Inmarsat Ltd. The IMSO and Inmarsat Ltd. signed an agreement imposing public safety obligations on the new company. Inmarsat was the first international satellite organisation that was privatised.

In 2005, Apax Partners and Permira bought shares in the company. The company was also first listed on the London Stock Exchange in that year. In March 2008, it was disclosed that U.S. hedge fund Harbinger Capital owned 28% of the company. In 2009, Inmarsat completed the acquisition of satellite communications provider Stratos Global Corporation (Stratos) and acquired a 19-per cent stake in SkyWave Mobile Communications Inc., a provider of Inmarsat D+/IsatM2M network services which in turn purchased the GlobalWave business from TransCore. Inmarsat won the 2010 MacRobert Award for its Broadband Global Area Network (BGAN) service.

Inmarsat at first provided services using Marisat and MARECS, which were launched by the US Navy and ESA respectively. In the early 1990s Inmarsat launched its first dedicated satellite constellation, Inmarsat-2. These satellites provided the Inmarsat-A service for maritime uses. Between 1996 and 1998 Inmarsat's second constellation, Inmarsat-3, was launched. Consisting of five geostationary L-band satellites the constellation provides the Inmarsat-B and Inmarsat-C services, primarily providing low bandwidth communications and safety services for global shipping. Following privatisation in 1999 Inmarsat developed and launched the first satellite communications system offering global coverage, BGAN. This service was provided initially through the three Inmarsat-4 satellite launched between 2005 and 2008, and was then extended with the addition of Alphasat in 2013.

In the 2010s, Inmarsat began development of the High Throughput Satellite (HTS) constellation Global Xpress, operating in the Ka-band portion of the spectrum. Global Xpress, launched in 2015, offers global satellite capacity to various markets including shipping and aviation. Global Xpress also marks a significant expansion of Inmarsat's commercial operations in the aviation markets. In 2017, Inmarsat launched its first S-band satellite, intended to provide (in association with an LTE ground network) inflight internet access across Europe. In March 2018, Inmarsat partnered with Isotropic Systems to develop a state-of-the-art, all electronic scanning antenna intended to be used with the Global Xpress network.

On 20 September 2018 Inmarsat announced its strategic collaboration with Panasonic Avionics Corporation for an initial ten-year period, to provide in-flight broadband for commercial airlines. Inmarsat will be the exclusive provider of Panasonic for connectivity using the Ka-band satellite signal. Inmarsat will now be offering Panasonic's portfolio of services to its commercial aviation customers.

=== Takeover by Connect Bidco and privatisation ===
In March 2019 the company's board agreed to recommend a takeover offer of US$3.4 billion from Connect Bidco, a consortium consisting of Apax Partners, Warburg Pincus, the CPP Investment Board and the Ontario Teachers' Pension Plan. On 9 October 2019, Bloomberg reported that the UK government was set to approve the takeover with the final consultation for the deal set to conclude on 24 October 2019.

In November 2019, Inmarsat rejected an eleventh-hour effort to derail the US$6 billion sale, in which it was accused of ignoring a potential boost to the company's value. Oaktree argued that the recommended offer for Inmarsat failed to take account of the potential value of spectrum assets used by Inmarsat's U.S. partner Ligado. Inmarsat delisted from London Stock Exchange, as the private equity funds took control of the company, on 5 December 2019; at the time, Inmarsat was operating 14 geostationary communications satellites.

=== Acquisition by Viasat ===
On 8 November 2021 a $7.3bn deal was announced between Inmarsat's owners, led by Apax and Warburg Pincus, and Viasat in which Viasat would purchase Inmarsat for $850m in cash, issuing approximately 46 million shares of Viasat stock and taking on $3.4bn in debt. Viasat has promised to honour a pledge made by the previous owners, when it was taken private in 2019, that Inmarsat would remain a UK-based company, and for other planned investments.

Provisional approval for the merger was given by the UK's Competition and Markets Authority in March 2023 with 25 May 2023 set as the date for a formal decision. The acquisition closed on 31 May 2023.

== Operations ==
The Inmarsat head office is at Old Street Roundabout in the London Borough of Islington. Aside from its commercial services, Inmarsat provides Global Maritime Distress and Safety System (GMDSS) to ships and aircraft at no charge, as a public service.

Services include traditional voice calls, low-level data tracking systems, and high-speed Internet and other data services as well as distress and safety services. The Broadband Global Area Network (BGAN) network provides General Packet Radio Service (GPRS) – type services at up to 800 kbit/s at a latency of 900–1100 ms via an Internet Protocol (IP) satellite modem the size of a notebook computer, while the Global Xpress network offers up to 50 Mbit/s at a latency of 700 ms via antennas as small as 60 cm. Other services provide mobile Integrated Services Digital Network (ISDN) services used by the media for live reporting on world events via videophone, and inflight Internet access via the European Aviation Network.

The price of a call via Inmarsat has now dropped to a level where they are comparable to, and in many cases lower than, international roaming costs, or hotel phone calls. Voice call charges are the same for any location in the world where the service is used. Tariffs for calls to Inmarsat country codes vary, depending on the country in which they are placed. Inmarsat primarily uses country code 870 (see below). Newer Inmarsat services use an IP technology that features an always-on capability where the users are only charged for the amount of data they send and receive, rather than the length of time they are connected. In addition to its own satellites, Inmarsat has a collaboration agreement with ACeS regarding handheld voice services.

== Coverage ==
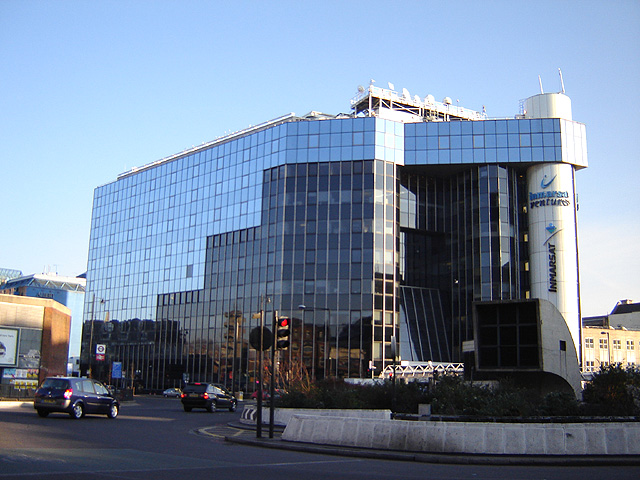
Inmarsat Global HQ at 99 City Road, London. (January 2006)

There are three types of coverage related to each Inmarsat I-4 satellite.

=== Global beam coverage ===
Each satellite is equipped with a single beam that covers up to one-third of the Earth's surface, apart from the poles. Overall, global beam coverage extends from latitudes of −82 to +82° regardless of longitude.

=== Regional spot beam coverage ===
Each regional beam covers a fraction of the area covered by a global beam, but collectively all of the regional beams offer virtually the same coverage as the global beams. Use of regional beams allow user terminals (also called mobile earth stations) to operate with significantly smaller antennas. Regional beams were introduced with the I-3 satellites. Each I-3 satellite provides four to six spot beams; each I-4 satellite provides 19 regional beams.

=== Narrow spot beam coverage ===
Narrow beams are offered by the three Inmarsat-4 satellites. Narrow spot beams allow yet smaller antennas and much higher data rates. They form the backbone of Inmarsat's handheld (GSPS) and broadband services (BGAN). This coverage was introduced with the I-4 satellites. Each I-4 satellite provides around 200 narrow spot beams.

=== Global Xpress (I-5) ===
The Inmarsat I-5 satellites provide coverage of most of the inhabited world using four geostationary satellites. Each satellite supports 89 beams, giving a total coverage of approximately one-third of the Earth's surface per satellite. In addition, 6 steerable beams are available per satellite, which may be moved to provide higher capacity to selected locations.

On 26 November 2019, the first satellite to extend the original 4 satellite first generation Global Xpress constellation was launched from Centre Spatial Guyanais (CSG) by an Ariane 5 launch vehicle.

== Satellites ==
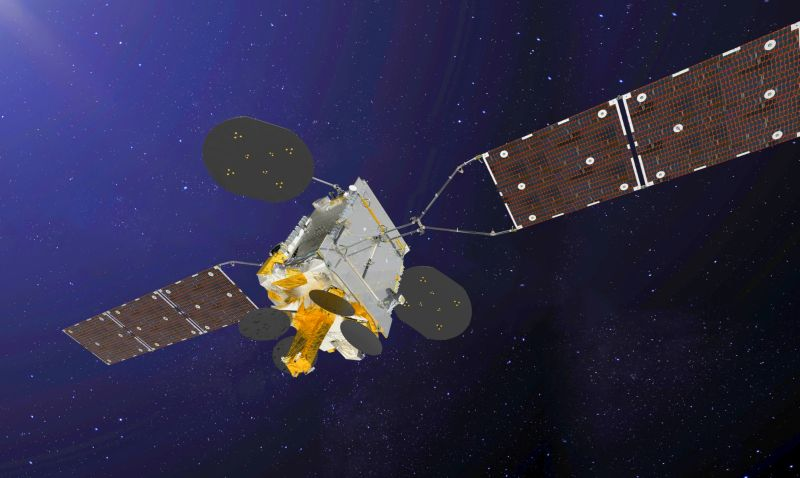
GX5 satellite

| Satellite | Coverage | Longitude | Vehicles | Launch date (UTC) | Services / notes |
Marisat series
| Marisat F1 | | | Delta 2914 | 19 February 1976 | Decommissioned 1997 |
| Marisat F2 | | | Delta 2914 | 14 October 1976 | Transferred to Intelsat in 2004, decommissioned in 2008 |
| Marisat F3 | | | Delta 2914 | 10 June 1976 | Decommissioned |
MARECS series
| MARECS-A | | | Ariane 1 | 20 December 1981 | Deactivated August 1996 |
| MARECS-B | | | Ariane 1 | 9 September 1982 | Launch failure |
| MARECS-C | | | Ariane 3 | 10 November 1984 | also known as MARECS-B2, deactivated 2002 |
Inmarsat-2 series
| Inmarsat-2 F1 | | | Delta II 6925 | 30 October 1990 | Decommissioned 19 April 2013; Previous record holder for mission lifespan |
| Inmarsat-2 F2 | | | Delta II 6925 | 8 March 1991 | Decommissioned in December 2014; World record for mission lifespan |
| Inmarsat-2 F3 | | | Ariane 44L | 16 December 1991 | Decommissioned 2006 |
| Inmarsat-2 F4 | | | Ariane 44L | 15 April 1992 | Decommissioned 2012 |
Inmarsat-3 series
| Inmarsat-3 F1 | | | Atlas IIA | 3 April 1996 | Reassigned to Maritime safety backup service in 2020 |
| Inmarsat-3 F2 | | | Proton-K/DM1 | 6 September 1996 | Reassigned to Maritime safety backup service in 2019 |
| Inmarsat-3 F3 | | 178° East | Atlas IIA | 18 December 1996 | Existing and evolved services only |
| Inmarsat-3 F4 | | | Ariane 44L | 3 June 1997 | Decommissioned 2016 |
| Inmarsat-3 F5 | AOR | 54° West | Ariane 44LP | 4 February 1998 | L-band, Classic Aero services and other various leases |
Inmarsat-4 series
| Inmarsat-4 F1 | APAC | 178° East | Atlas V 431 | 11 March 2005 | L-band, BGAN family, Classic Aero, SPS and lease services |
| Inmarsat-4 F2 | IOR | 143.5° East | Zenit-3SL | 8 November 2005 | L-band, BGAN family, Classic Aero, SPS and lease services, FleetBroadband, SwiftBroadband Transferred from 25° East to 63° East in mid-2015 |
| Inmarsat-4 F3 | AMER | 98° West | Proton-M / Briz-M | 18 August 2008 | L-band, BGAN family, Classic Aero and lease services |
| Inmarsat-4A F4 (AlphaSat) | EMEA | 25° East | Ariane 5ECA | 25 July 2013 | L-band, BGAN family, Classic Aero, SPS and lease services |
Inmarsat-5 (GX) series
| Inmarsat-5 F1 (GX-1) | I-5 Europe, Middle East, Africa | 62.6° East | Proton-M / Briz-M | 8 December 2013 | Ka-band global data services, Global Xpress |
| Inmarsat-5 F2 (GX-2) | I-5 Americas | 55° West | Proton-M / Briz-M | 2 February 2015 | Ka-band global data services, Global Xpress |
| Inmarsat-5 F3 (GX-3) | I-5 Pacific, Asia, West Americas | 179.6° East | Proton-M / Briz-M | 28 August 2015 | Ka-band global data services, Global Xpress |
| Inmarsat-5 F4 (GX-4) | I-5 Europe + in-orbit spare | 56.5° East | Falcon 9 Full Thrust | 15 May 2017 | Ka-band global data services, Global Xpress |
| Inmarsat-5 F5 (GX-5) | Europe and Middle East | 11° East | Ariane 5ECA | 26 November 2019 | Ka-band global data services, higher capacity GX satellite after the 4 first generation satellites |
European Aviation Network
| Inmarsat S EAN (Hellas Sat 3) | Europe | 39° East | Ariane 5 | 28 June 2017 | S-band services for European aviation |
Inmarsat-6 series
| Inmarsat-6 F1 | | | H-IIA F45 | 22 December 2021 | |
| Inmarsat-6 F2 | | | Falcon 9 Block 5 | 18 February 2023 | Failed in orbit |

== Country codes ==
The permanent telephone country code for calling Inmarsat destinations is:

- 870 SNAC (Single Network Access Code)

The 870 number is an automatic locator; it is not necessary to know to which satellite the destination Inmarsat terminal is logged-in. SNAC is now usable by all Inmarsat services.

Country codes phased out on 31 December 2008 were

- 871 Atlantic Ocean Region – East (AOR-E)
- 872 Pacific Ocean Region (POR)
- 873 Indian Ocean Region (IOR)
- 874 Atlantic Ocean Region – West (AOR-W)

Since 18 July 2017, Inmarsat users using the service provided by China Transport Telecommunication & Information Center may apply for 11-digit Chinese mobile phone numbers starting with 1749. An international call function is not required when making phone calls to such numbers from Mainland China.

== Services ==
Inmarsat-3 satellite locations

Inmarsat networks provide existing, evolved, and advanced services. Existing and evolved services are offered through land Earth stations which are not owned nor operated by Inmarsat, but through companies which have a commercial agreement with Inmarsat. Advanced services are provided via distribution partners but the satellite gateways are owned and operated by Inmarsat directly.

=== High Throughput Services ===
- Global Xpress: Since 2015, Inmarsat has offered high throughput services through the Global Xpress network. This service provides an IP based global service of up to 50 Mbit/s downlink and 5 Mbit/s uplink at a latency of 700 ms. Services are provided for maritime, aviation, government and enterprise markets. Global Xpress is supported by the existing BGAN L-band network, and services are offered using a combination of the two networks to increase availability and reliability. In March 2018, Inmarsat partnered with Isotropic Systems to develop all-electronic scanning antenna intended to be used with the Global Xpress network.
- European Aviation Network: Inmarsat offers aviation services through the European Aviation Network, developed in partnership with Deutsche Telekom. The European Aviation Network uses a ground-based LTE network and an Inmarsat S-band satellite to provide 50 Gbit/s capacity to aircraft in European airspace. The project faced a number of legal and regulatory challenges. In October 2017, Inmarsat stated that commercial service would begin in 2018. Construction of the ground network was completed in February 2018, and by mid-2019 the service was offered on over 100 routes from key destinations such as London, Madrid, Barcelona, Athens, Lisbon, Prague, Rome and Vienna. As of early 2021, the service has been used on 200,000 flights throughout Europe on flights on 250 aircraft operated by British Airways, Iberia and Vueling.

=== Advanced services ===
The BGAN family is a set of IP-based shared-carrier services:

- BGAN: Broadband Global Area Network for use on land. BGAN uses the I-4 satellites to offer a shared-channel IP packet-switched service of up to 800 kbit/s (uplink and downlink speeds may differ and depend on terminal model) and a streaming-IP service from 32 kbit/s up to X-Stream data rate (services depend on terminal model). Most terminals also offer circuit-switched Mobile Integrated Services Digital Network (ISDN) services at 64 kbit/s and even low speed (4.8 kbit/s) voice etc. services. BGAN service is available globally on all I4 satellites.
- FleetBroadband (FB): A maritime service, FleetBroadband is based on BGAN technology, offering similar services and using the same infrastructure as BGAN. A range of Fleet Broadband user terminals are available, designed for ships.
- SwiftBroadband (SB): An aeronautical service, SwiftBroadband is based on BGAN technology and offers similar services. SB terminals are designed for commercial, private, and military aircraft.

=== M2M communications ===
The BGAN M2M family, also branded as Viasat IoT, is a set of IP-based services designed for long-term machine-to-machine and Internet-of-Things management of fixed assets:

- BGAN M2M: launched in January 2012, is a global, IP-based low-data rate service, designed for high data availability and performance in permanently unmanned environments. With high-frequency, very low-latency data reporting, BGAN M2M is intended for monitoring fixed assets such as pipelines and oil well heads, or backhauling electricity consumption data within a utility.
- IsatM2M: IsatM2M is a global, short burst data, store and forward service intended to deliver messages of 10.5 or 25.5 bytes in the send direction, and 100 bytes in the receive direction. The service is delivered to market via SkyWave Mobile Communications and Honeywell Global Tracking.
- IsatData Pro: IsatData Pro is a global satellite data service designed for two-way text and data communications to remote assets with message size to mobile: 10 KB / from mobile: 6.4 KB with typical delivery time of 15 seconds. This service is intended for mission-critical applications for managing trucks, fishing vessels and oil and gas and heavy equipment, text message remote workers and security applications. It is provided by SkyWave Mobile Communications Inc, part of Orbcomm.

=== Global voice services ===
The company offers portable and fixed phone services:

- IsatPhone 2: IsatPhone 2 is a mobile satellite phone offering voice telephony. It has a variety of data capabilities, including SMS, short message emailing and GPS look-up-and-send, as well as supporting a data service of up to 20 kbit/s.
- IsatPhone Link: IsatPhone Link is a low-cost, fixed, global satellite phone service. It provides voice connectivity for those working or living in areas without cellular coverage and includes data capabilities.
- FleetPhone: Inmarsat's FleetPhone service is a fixed phone service for use on smaller vessels where voice communications is the primary requirement or on vessels where additional voice lines are needed. It provides a low-cost, global satellite phone service option for those working or sailing outside cellular coverage.

==== Existing and evolved services ====
These are based on older technologies:

- Aeronautical (Classic Aero): provides analogue voice/fax/data services for aircraft. Three levels of terminals, Aero-L (Low Gain Antenna) primarily for packet data including ACARS and ADS, Aero-H (High Gain Antenna) for medium quality voice and fax/data at up to 9600 bit/s, and Aero-I (Intermediate Gain Antenna) for low quality voice and fax/data at up to 2400 bit/s. There are also aircraft-rated versions of Inmarsat-C and mini-M/M4. The aircraft version of GAN is called Swift 64 (see below).
- Inmarsat-C: this is effectively a "satellite telex" terminal with low-speed all-digital (transmission bit rate 1200 bit/s and information bit rate of 600 bit/s) store-and-forward, polling etc. capabilities. Certain models of Inmarsat-C terminals are approved for the Global Maritime Distress and Safety System (GMDSS) system, equipped with GPS.
- Fleet: a family of networks that includes the Inmarsat-Fleet77, Inmarsat-Fleet55 and Inmarsat-Fleet33 members (The numbers 77, 55 and 33 come from the diameter of the antenna in centimetres). Much like GAN, it provides a selection of low speed services like voice at 4.8 kbit/s, fax/data at 2.4 kbit/s, medium speed services like fax/data at 9.6 kbit/s, ISDN like services at 64 kbit/s (called Mobile ISDN) and shared-channel IP packet-switched data services at 64 kbit/s (called Mobile Packet Data Service or MPDS – see below). However, not all services are available with all members of the family. The latest service to be supported is Mobile ISDN at 128 kbit/s on Inmarsat-Fleet77 terminals.
- Swift 64: Similar to GAN, providing voice, low rate fax/data, 64 kbit/s ISDN, and MPDS services, for private, business, and commercial aircraft. Swift 64 is often sold in a multi-channel version, to support several times 64 kbit/s.
- Inmarsat D/D+/IsatM2M: Inmarsat's pager, although much larger than terrestrial versions. Some units are equipped with GPS. The original Inmarsat-D terminals were one-way (to mobile) pagers. The newer Inmarsat-D+ terminals are the equivalent of a two-way pager. The main use of this technology nowadays is in tracking trucks and buoys and SCADA applications.
- MPDS (Mobile Packet Data Service): Previously known as IPDS, this is an IP-based data service in which several users share a 64 kbit/s carrier in a manner similar to ADSL. MPDS-specific terminals are not sold; rather, this is a service which comes with most terminals that are designed for GAN, Fleet, and Swift64.
- IsatPhone: provides voice services at 4.8 kbit/s and medium speed fax/data services at 2.4 kbit/s. This service emerged from a collaboration agreement with ACeS, and is available in the EMEA and APAC satellite regions. Coverage is available in Africa, the Middle-East, Asia and Europe, as well as in maritime areas of the EMEA and APAC coverage.

==== Retired services ====
- Inmarsat-B: service was retired on 30 December 2016. It provided digital voice services, telex services, medium speed fax/data services at 9.6 kbit/s and high speed data services at 56, 64 or 128 kbit/s. There was also a 'leased' mode for Inmarsat-B available on the spare Inmarsat satellites.
- Inmarsat-M: provides voice services at 4.8 kbit/s and medium speed fax/data services at 2.4 kbit/s. It paved the way towards Inmarsat-Mini-M. Service has ended.
- Mini-M: provides voice services at 4.8 kbit/s and medium speed fax/data services at 2.4 kbit/s. One 2.4 kbit/s channel takes up 4.8 kbit/s on the satellite. Service was closed early January 2017.
- GAN (Global Area Network): provides a selection of low speed services like voice at 4.8 kbit/s, fax and data at 2.4 kbit/s, ISDN like services at 64 kbit/s (called Mobile ISDN) and shared-channel IP packet-switched data services at 64 kbit/s (called Mobile Packet Data Service or MPDS, formerly Inmarsat Packet Data Service – IPDS). GAN is also known as "M4". Service was closed early in January 2017.

== Projects since 2008 ==
=== European Aviation Network ===
On 30 June 2008, the European Parliament and the European Council adopted the European's Decision to establish a single selection and authorisation process (ESAP – European S-band Application Process) to ensure a coordinated introduction of mobile satellite services (MSS) in Europe. The late 2008 selection process attracted four applications by prospective operators (ICO Global Communications (ICO), Inmarsat, Solaris Mobile (EchoStar Mobile), and TerreStar).

In May 2009, the European Commission selected two operators, Inmarsat Ventures and Solaris Mobile, giving these operators "the right to use the specific radio frequencies identified in the Commission's decision and the right to operate their respective mobile satellite systems". EU Member States now have to ensure that the two operators have the right to use the specific radio frequencies identified in the commission's decision and the right to operate their respective mobile satellite systems for 18 years from the selection decision. The operators are compelled to start operations within 24 months (May 2011) from the selection decision.

Inmarsat's S-band satellite programme provides mobile multimedia broadcast, mobile two-way broadband telecommunications and next-generation MSS services across all member states of the European Union and as far east as Moscow and Ankara by means of a hybrid satellite/terrestrial network. It was built by Thales Alenia Space and launched in 2017. The complementary ground network consists of around 300 LTE base stations constructed by Deutsche Telekom.

The European Aviation Network faced legal challenges as of 2018, including one from Viasat alleging unfair bidding practices and a misuse of spectrum and a ruling by the Belgian telecommunications regulator revoking permission for the use of the ground network in Belgium.

=== Global Xpress Expansion ===
Inmarsat ordered a fifth Global Xpress satellite from Thales Group. The satellite launched 26 November 2019 from Centre Spatial Guyanais (CSG) aboard an Ariane 5 launch vehicle. The satellite has been described as a 'very high throughput satellite', and provides services to the Middle East, India and Europe. The CEO at the time, Rupert Pearce, indicated that Inmarsat planned further expansion of the Global Xpress network. Trials of new technologies demonstrated bandwidths of 330 Mbit/s over the existing Global Xpress network, far in excess of the existing 50 Mbit/s.

Polar Coverage

To provide GX coverage to the users in the Arctic region, Inmarsat plans to improve GlobalXpress connectivity to above 65° North.

Two high-capacity, multi-beam payloads GX-10A and GX-10B were planned in Highly elliptical orbits (HEO) for reliable coverage. Inmarsat worked in partnership with Space Norway HEOSAT in the Arctic Satellite Broadband Mission. The satellites carrying the Inmarsat payload were to be manufactured by Northrop Grumman Innovation Systems (NGIS). Launch for GX-10A and 10B was scheduled for 2022.

=== Inmarsat-6 ===
At the end of 2015, Inmarsat ordered two sixth generation satellites from Airbus. These satellites planned to offer both Ka- and L-band payloads and additional capacity to the existing BGAN and Global Xpress networks. In 2017, it was announced that the first of these satellites would be launched by MHI in December 2021. The first of the two satellites, Inmarsat-6 F1, was successfully launched on 22 December 2021 on a H-IIA rocket. The second satellite Inmarsat-6 F2 (GX 6B) was launched on 18 February 2023 on a Falcon 9 Block 5 rocket, but suffered a power system failure in orbit that prevented it from becoming operational.

=== Inmarsat-8 ===
In May 2023, Inmarsat ordered three eighth-generation satellites from SWISSto12 SA, which will be based on their HummingSat satellite platform.

=== IRIS and ICE ===
Inmarsat is participating in two ESA ARTES programs, IRIS and ICE:

- IRIS is a project to improve tracking of aircraft, and to improve communications between aircraft and air traffic controllers. Inmarsat will provide high capacity satellite communications links for aircraft, and improve detection of aircraft locations in time and space.
- ICE (Inmarsat Communications Evolution) is a partnership with industrial partners intended to identify innovative technologies that can expand and enhance the capabilities of the next generation of satellite communications.

== Issues ==
INMARSAT and Iridium frequency bands abut each other at 1626.5 MHz thus each satcom radio has the ability to interfere with the other. Usually, the far more powerful INMARSAT radio disrupts the Iridium radio up to 10–800 m (33–2,625 ft) away.

== Notable usages ==
=== Malaysia Airlines Flight 370 ===
In March 2014, Malaysia Airlines Flight 370 disappeared with 239 passengers and crew en route from Kuala Lumpur to Beijing. After turning away from its planned path and disappearing from radar coverage, the aircraft's satellite data unit remained in contact with Inmarsat's ground station in Perth via the IOR satellite (Indian Ocean Region, 64° East). The aircraft used Inmarsat's Classic Aero satellite phone service. Analysis of these communications by Inmarsat and independently by other agencies determined that the aircraft flew into the southern Indian Ocean and was used to guide the search for the aircraft. In conferences given by French engineers and pilots Jean-Luc Marchand and Patrick Blelly stated that the company tried to reach, several hours after the plane disappeared, the aeroplane by ringing the satellite phone on board.

=== Attacks of US Embassies ===
The attacks on US Embassies in Nairobi (Kenya) and Dar es Salaam (Tanzania) in summer of 1998 were organized partly through satellite communications. Osama bin Laden asked one of his staff to acquire a Mini-M satellite phone in London, using cash of about US$10,000 to US$15,000 which had been sent to several Al-Qaeda members. The terrorist used it to make about 900 satellite calls, but stopped using it in 1998 when several newspapers reported that the CIA was tapping it. His phone number, which was 00-873-682505331, (00 for international, 873 for Indian Ocean based sat coverage, 682505331 as the line) was disclosed during a trial of the bombings of the US embassy in Kenya. His satellite phone was described as the size and appearance of a laptop.

== See also ==
- Mobile-satellite service
- AeroMobile
- Globalsat Group
- Librestream
- Maritime safety information
- O3b Networks
- OnAir (telecommunications)
- Orbcomm
- Radiotelephone
- SES Broadband for Maritime
- Sky and Space Global
- Thuraya
- Wideband Global SATCOM (WGS)
