= SkyTerra =

Former telecommunications company

SkyTerra (SKYT), formerly Mobile Satellite Ventures (MSV or MSVLP), was a Reston, Virginia company that developed telecommunications systems that integrate satellite and terrestrial radio communication technologies into one system. In March 2010, the company was acquired by Harbinger Capital Partners and under the leadership of CEO Sanjiv Ahuja became part of a new company called LightSquared. The company placed its first satellite, SkyTerra-1, in orbit on November 14, 2010. LightSquared has since then gone bankrupt and emerged from bankruptcy as Ligado Networks.

== History ==
The Corporation was founded in 1988 as American Mobile Satellite Corporation (AMSC), a consortium of several organizations originally dedicated to satellite broadcasting of telephone, fax, and data signals. Its acquisition of ARDIS was completed on March 31, 1998. On April 24, 2000, the company changed its name to Motient Corporation, with its stock traded on the NASDAQ National Market under the symbol "MTNT". MSV was formed by the integration of the spun-off satellite operations of Motient and TMI Communications and Company, L.P., a wholly owned subsidiary of BCE Inc. of Canada. The new company has operations in both America and Canada, providing service to both countries and the Caribbean. MSV changed its name to SkyTerra in December 2008. The company was traded Over-the-Counter and was listed on the OTCBB: SKYT. SkyTerra (formerly ‘Mobile Satellite Ventures’) was the first company to receive a Federal Communications Commission license to deploy Ancillary Terrestrial Component (ATC) technology.

In 2005, SkyTerra purchased 50% of Hughes Network Solutions, a subsidiary of the News Corp.-owned DirecTV Group, for $157.4 million, which SkyTerra held under its subsidiary Hughes Communications. In January 2006, DirecTV sold its remaining 50% share in Hughes Network Solutions to SkyTerra for $100 million. Hughes Communications was spun off as a separate company in February 2006, with SkyTerra divesting its entire stake in the company to its shareholders.

TerreStar Corporation, formerly Motient Corporation, was the controlling shareholder of TerreStar Networks Inc. and TerreStar Global Ltd., and a shareholder of SkyTerra Communications.

SkyTerra Communications Inc was acquired by Harbinger Capital Partners on March 29, 2010, for $5.00 per share and became part of LightSquared in July 2010.

Lightsquared went bankrupt. After emerging from bankruptcy LightSquared is rebranding as Ligado Networks.

AMSC initially provided GEO based satellite services based on its MSAT satellite.

- Elements of MSV were previously known as Motient.
- Elements of MSV were previously known as TMI Communications and Co.
- Motient was one of the founders of XM Satellite Radio.

== MSV satellite telephony ==
Most of their current products and services are aimed at emergency services, law enforcement, and companies that specialize in transportation. However, MSV and Boeing are developing a satellite telephony network for consumers.

The use of Boeing's GeoMobile platform will allow for coverage of the entire United States with a single satellite. This new approach to satellite telephony has already been validated with the Thuraya network. MSV's satellite will use an even bigger antenna than the Thuraya spacecraft (at 22 meters in diameter, it will be the largest commercial reflector dish ever used in space), allowing it to communicate with phones no larger than modern cell phones because the large antenna gain allows the handset to operate at a power output comparable to regular cell phones. This is now possible since the Federal Communications Commission (FCC) allowed satellite operators to create terrestrial cellular networks using spectrum previously restricted to satellite use, which means that phones can be compatible with both the upcoming MSV satellite phone network and local cellular networks, allowing a user to communicate over the regular cellular network, and only rely on the satellites in areas outside the range of cell towers. MSV has earned patents for this set-up. It will be useful in sparsely populated areas where the construction of cell towers is not cost-effective, as well as to emergency-response services which must remain operational even when the local cellular network is out of service.

== Satellites ==
The SkyTerra space segment consists of the MSAT geostationary satellites MSAT-1 and MSAT-2.

The SkyTerra 1 (formerly MSV 1, COSPAR 2010-061A, SATCAT 37218) satellite, a 5,400 kg Boeing 702, was successfully launched from Baikonur Cosmodrome on November 14, 2010 by an ILS Proton-M booster. Expected service life of the satellite is 15 years. Its L-band antenna was 22m in diameter, making it the largest commercial antenna built at the time. The initial deployment of the satellite's antenna failed, but the antenna was later deployed successfully one month after launch. In March 2012, the satellite was knocked out by a strong solar flare, but it recovered.

Back when the company was known as Mobile Satellite Ventures, the original plans called for three satellites: MSV 1, MSV 2 and MSV SA. MSV 1 and 2 became later SkyTerra 1 and 2, respectively and MSV SA was dropped from plans. The plan was for MSV 1 and 2 satellites to cover North America and MSV SA to cover South America.

The planned satellite SkyTerra 2 was never launched; however the satellite was built (to some degree at least). After Lightsquared's bankruptcy, the components of the satellite that was to be SkyTerra 2 were repurposed by Boeing to become the MEXSAT satellite.

== See also ==
- Mobile-satellite service
- Satellite phone
- Globalstar
- ICO Global Communications
- Land Mobile Radio Service
- MSAT
- O3b Networks
- SkyWave Mobile Communications
- EchoStar Mobile
- TerreStar Networks
- XM Satellite Radio
