= GEO-Mobile Radio Interface =

GEO-Mobile Radio Interface (GEO stands for Geostationary Earth Orbit), better known as GMR, is an ETSI standard for satellite phones. The GMR standard is derived from the 3GPP-family terrestrial digital cellular standards and supports access to GSM/UMTS core networks. It is used by ACeS, ICO, Inmarsat, SkyTerra, TerreStar and Thuraya.

There are two widely deployed variants of GMR, both heavily modeled after GSM

- GMR-1: The first version of the standard and that has evolved over time into 3 different revisions:
  - GMR-1: The basic circuit switched model, more or less corresponding to what GSM Phase 2 is, and using exactly the same core network infrastructure.
  - GMPRS (GEO-Mobile Packet Radio Service): Adding support for packet data. The equivalent of GPRS in the GSM world. Still connected to a 'Gb' style core network.
  - GMR-1 3G: Adds support for some new channel types, but the most important changes are in the core network, adding interoperability with UMTS core network components. Contrary to the classic cell network where UMTS and GSM have a radically different air-interface, GMR-1 3G is still very similar to GMR-1 on the Layer 1 side.
- GMR-2: Which is not an evolution of GMR-1 but rather a concurrent standard that has been developed by another group of companies.

GMR-1 is the technology used by Thuraya. GMR-1 3G is the technology used for TerreStar and SkyTerra. GMR-2 is used by Inmarsat iSatPhonePro.

GMR was developed by TIA and ETSI.

== Air Interface Ciphers ==
Versions of standard and cipher used:

- GMR-1 - GEO mobile radio 1 (Thuraya). Based on 4 LFSR registers.
- GMR-2 - GEO mobile radio 2 (InmarSat iSatPhonePro). Based on byte operations and 2 S-Boxes from DES.
