= Globalstar =

Global satellite telecommunications company

Globalstar, Inc.
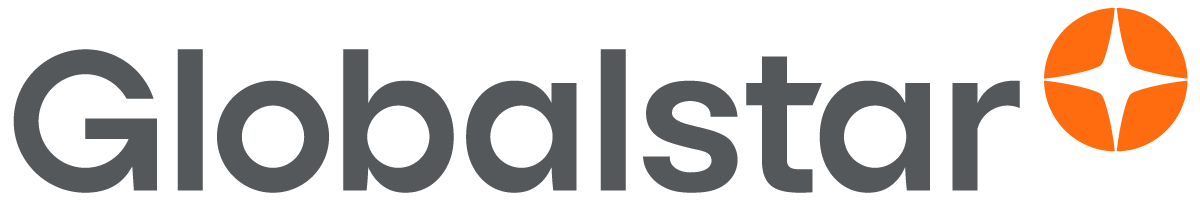
- Type: Public
- Traded as: Nasdaq: GSAT
- Industry: Telecommunications
- Founded: March 24, 1991; 35 years ago
- Headquarters: Covington, Louisiana, U.S.
- Key people: Paul E. Jacobs (CEO)
- Revenue: ▲US$273 million (2025)
- Net income: ▲ −US$8.65 million (2025)
- Website: globalstar.com

Globalstar, Inc. is an American telecommunications company that operates a satellite constellation in low Earth orbit (LEO) for satellite phone, low-speed data transmission and Earth observation. The Globalstar second-generation constellation consists of 25 satellites. In April 2026, Amazon announced an agreement to acquire Globalstar and merge it into its Amazon Leo business unit with the acquisition intended to close in 2027.

== History ==
The Globalstar project was launched in 1991 as a joint venture between Loral Space & Communications and Qualcomm. On March 24, 1994, the companies announced the formation of Globalstar LP, a limited partnership in the United States with financial participation from eight additional firms, including Alcatel, AirTouch, Deutsche Aerospace, Hyundai, and Vodafone. The system was projected to enter service in 1998 at an estimated cost of $1.8 billion. In 1994, Globalstar projected pricing of $0.65 per minute, compared to the approximately $3 per minute the competing Iridium service charged. The company obtained a worldwide license from the World Administrative Radio Conference and received U.S. spectrum allocation from the Federal Communications Commission (FCC) in January 1995, while continuing to negotiate international frequency rights.

The first satellites were launched in February 1998. A launch failure in September 1998 resulted in the loss of 12 satellites, delaying deployment. In late 1999, Globalstar began "friendly user" trials with 44 of the planned 48 satellites. The first call on the system was placed on November 1, 1998, from Qualcomm chairman Irwin Jacobs in San Diego to Loral Space & Communications CEO and chairman Bernard Schwartz in New York City. Limited commercial service began in December 1999, followed by full commercial service in February 2000 across North America, Europe, and Brazil using 48 satellites and four in-orbit spares; additional satellites were maintained as ground spares. Initial pricing was $1.79 per minute.

Following the September 11 attacks in 2001, Qualcomm developed an experimental airborne Globalstar system using multiple user terminals to increase data throughput. The system provided voice and data connectivity, integrated with aircraft systems, and enabled transmission of telemetry and video. On February 15, 2002, Globalstar and three subsidiaries filed for Chapter 11 bankruptcy protection. Restructuring was completed in 2004, following an initial stage in December 2003 in which Thermo Capital Partners assumed operational control. Globalstar LLC was formed in November 2003 and converted into Globalstar, Inc., on March 17, 2006. In 2007, Globalstar launched eight additional first-generation satellites to supplement failing spacecraft. Between 2010 and 2013, the company deployed 24 second-generation satellites to restore system capacity. During this period, Globalstar relocated its headquarters from Silicon Valley to Covington, Louisiana.

In March 2020, the Third Generation Partnership Project approved Globalstar's Band 53 for 5G use, designated as band n53. In March 2021, the company announced the discontinuation of its Sat-Fi2 and Sat-Fi2 RAS services. On September 7, 2022, Apple announced satellite-based emergency messaging for iPhone using Globalstar’s network in the United States and Canada. In October 2024, Globalstar disclosed that Apple had agreed to acquire a 20% stake in the company, with new plans to increase the network to 54 satellites. On April 14, 2026, Amazon announced an agreement to acquire Globalstar for $11.57 billion, while pledging to continue support for Apple devices.

== Products and services ==
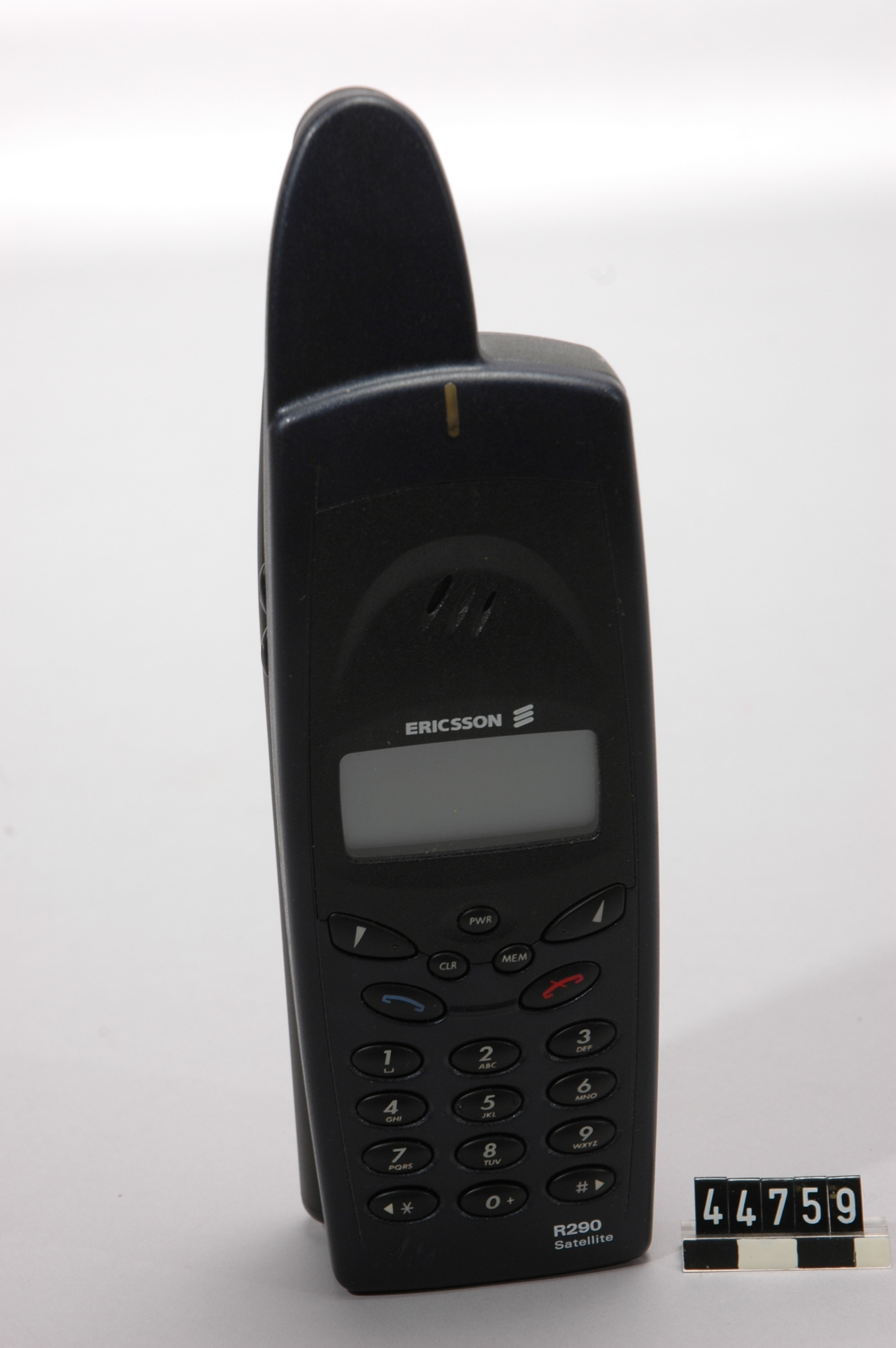
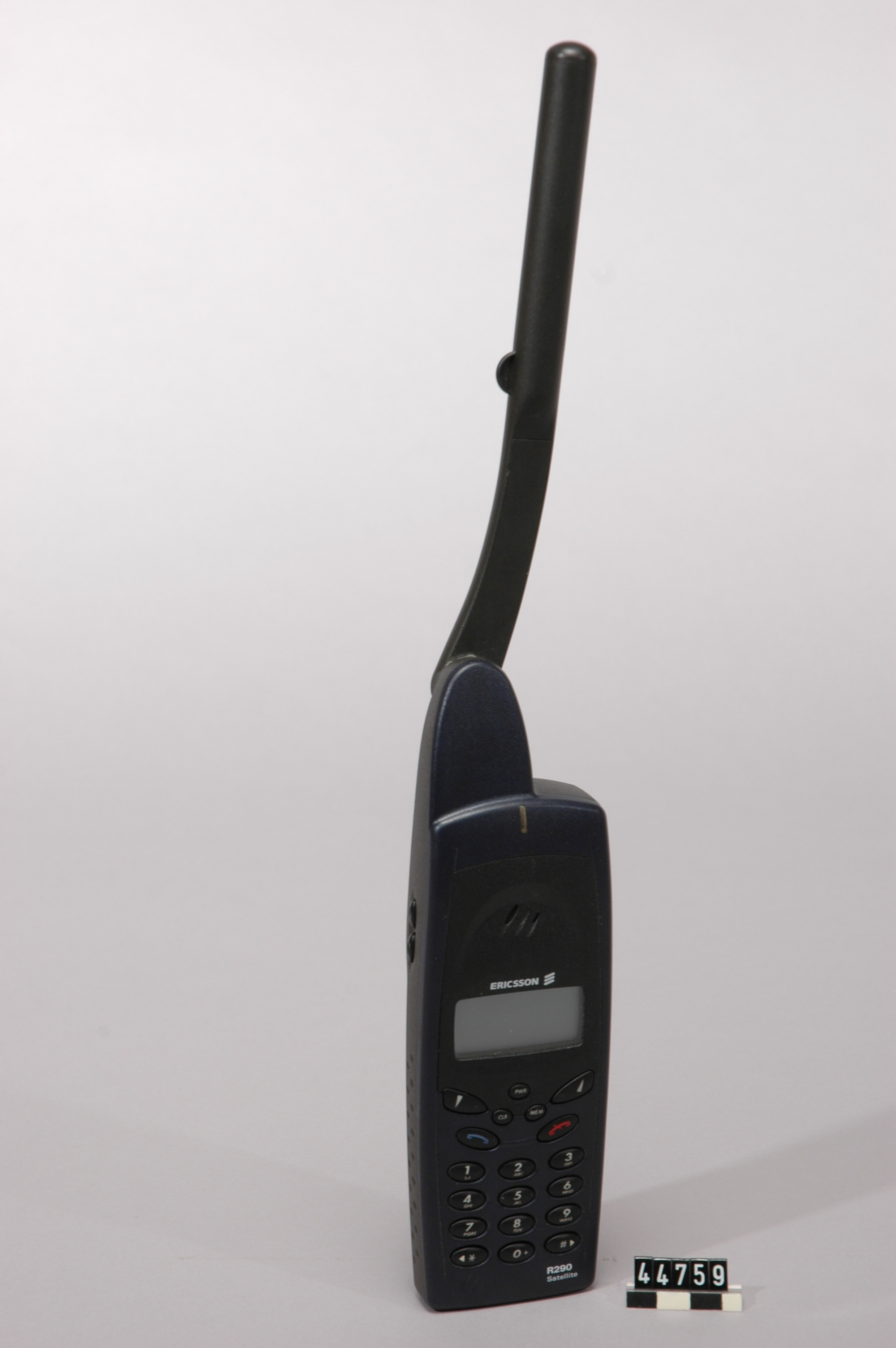
The Ericsson R290 is a combined GSM and satellite phone using the Globalstar satellite network.

Globalstar is a provider of satellite and terrestrial connectivity services. Globalstar offers these services to commercial and recreational users in more than 120 countries around the world. Globalstar's terrestrial spectrum, Band 53 and its 5G variant n53 offers carriers, cable companies and system integrators a fully licensed channel for private networks, while Globalstar's XCOMP technology offers capacity gains in dense wireless deployments. The company's products include simplex and duplex satellite devices, data modems, and satellite airtime packages. Many land-based and maritime industries make use of the various Globalstar products and services from remote areas beyond the reach of cellular and landline telephone services. However, many areas of the Earth's surface are left without service coverage, since a satellite requires being in range of an Earth station gateway. Global customer segments include oil and gas, government, mining, forestry, commercial fishing, utilities, military, transportation, heavy construction, emergency preparedness, and business continuity as well as individual recreational users. Globalstar data communication services are used for a variety of asset and personal tracking, data monitoring, and SCADA applications.

=== Satellite messengers ===
In late 2007, Globalstar subsidiary SPOT LLC launched a handheld satellite messaging and tracking personal safety device known as the SPOT Satellite Messenger. SPOT X, a two-way satellite messenger with GPS location tracking, navigational capabilities, social media linking and direct communication options to emergency services, was launched in 2018.

=== Simplex data modems ===
- Globalstar STINGR
- Globalstar STX2
- Globalstar STX3
- Globalstar ST100
- Globalstar SmartOne C
- Globalstar SmartOne Solar

=== Duplex data modems ===
- SPOT Trace
- SPOT Gen4
- SPOT X

=== Duplex voice/data modules ===
- Globalstar GSP-1620
- Globalstar GSP-1720

=== Services ===
- Voice telephony
- One-way mobile terminated SMS text messaging
- 9,600 bit/s circuit switched data calls (direct dial-up)
- 9,600 bit/s packet switched Internet access (direct Internet)
- One-way mobile originated short-burst messages (simplex devices only)
- Two-way mobile originated / mobile terminated short-burst messages (SPOT X device only)
- Device geolocation within approximately 30 km

=== Discontinued products and services ===
- Sat-Fi2 (satellite WiFi hotspot) and Sat-Fi2 RAS (remote antenna station)
- 72 kbit/s packet switched Internet access (on 2nd-gen WCDMA network)
- Globalstar GSP-1620
- Globalstar GSP-1720

== System architecture ==
=== Gateways ===
Globalstar satellites are simple "bent pipe" analog repeaters, unlike Iridium.

A network of ground gateway stations provides connectivity from the 40 satellites to the public switched telephone network and Internet. A satellite must have a Gateway station in view to provide service to any users. Twenty four Globalstar Gateways are located around the world, including seven in North America. Globalstar Gateways are the largest cellular base station in the world with a design capacity for over 10,000 concurrent phone calls over a coverage area that is roughly 50% of the size of the US. Globalstar supports CDMA technology such as the rake receiver and soft handoffs, so a handset may be talking via two spot beams to two Gateways for path diversity.

Globalstar users are assigned telephone numbers on the North American Numbering Plan in North America or the appropriate telephone numbering plan for the country that the overseas gateway is located in, except for Brazil, where the official Globalstar country code (+8818) is used. The use of gateway ground stations provides customers with localized regional phone numbers for their satellite handsets. But service cannot be provided in remote areas (such as areas of the South Pacific and the polar regions) if there are no gateway stations to cover the area. As of May 2012, voice and full-duplex data services are currently non-functional over much of Africa, the South Asian subcontinent, and most mid-ocean regions due to the lack of nearby gateway earth stations.

The Globalstar system uses the Qualcomm CDMA air interface; however, the Ericsson and Telit phones accept standard GSM SIM cards, while the Qualcomm GSP-1600/1700 phones do not have a SIM card interface, but use CDMA/IS-41 based authentication. Therefore, the Globalstar gateways need to support both the CDMA/IS-41 and the GSM standards.

Globalstar has roaming agreements with local cellular operators in some regions, enabling the use of a single phone number in satellite and cellular mode on multi-mode Globalstar handsets. These cellular roaming agreements are not in place in North America. Because of improvements in cellular phones and networks and the limitations inherent to satellite phones, the newest Globalstar handset (released in 2006) does not include cellular connectivity as Globalstar does not expect subscribers to carry it as their only mobile phone.

=== First generation satellites ===
Globalstar orbits have an inclination of 52 degrees. Therefore, Globalstar does not cover polar areas, due to the lower orbital inclination. Globalstar orbits have an orbital height of approximately 1400 km and latency is still relatively low (approximately 60ms). A Globalstar satellite has two body-mounted, Earth-facing arrays. First-generation Globalstars weigh approximately 550 kg. However, the second-generation Globalstar design will gain significant mass. In 2005, some of the satellites began to reach the limit of their operational lifetime of 7.5 years. In December 2005, Globalstar began to move some of its satellites into a graveyard orbit above LEO.

==== First-generation satellite problems ====
According to documents filed with the SEC on January 30, 2007, Globalstar's previously identified problems with its S-band amplifiers used on its satellites for two-way communications are occurring at a higher rate than expected, possibly eventually leading to reduced levels of two-way voice and duplex data service in 2008. The company's simplex data services used to support the asset tracking products as well as the SPOT Satellite Messenger are not affected by the S-band satellite issue mentioned above. Globalstar also launched eight ground spare satellites in 2007 to help reduce the impact of the issue.

In the filing, Globalstar made the following statements:

Based on data recently collected from satellite operations, the Company has concluded that the degradation of the amplifiers is now occurring at a rate that is faster than previously experienced and faster than the Company had previously anticipated.

Based on its most recent analysis, the Company now believes that, if the degradation of the S-band antenna amplifiers continues at the current rate or further accelerates, and if the Company is unsuccessful in developing additional technical solutions, the quality of two-way communications services will decline, and by some time in 2008 substantially all of the Company's currently in-orbit satellites will cease to be able to support two-way communications services.

Industry analysts speculate the problem is caused by radiation exposure the satellites receive when they pass through the South Atlantic Anomaly in their 876-mile (1414 km) altitude orbits.

The S-band antenna amplifier degradation does not affect adversely the Company's one-way "Simplex" data transmission services, which utilize only the L-band uplink from a subscriber's "Simplex" terminal to the satellites.

The Company is working on plans, including new products and services and pricing programs, and exploring the feasibility of accelerating procurement and launch of its second-generation satellite constellation, to attempt to reduce the effects of this problem upon its customers and operations. The Company will be able to forecast the duration of service coverage at any particular location in its service area and intends to make this information available without charge to its service providers, including its wholly owned operating subsidiaries, so that they may work with their subscribers to reduce the impact of the degradation in service quality in their respective service areas. The Company is also reviewing its business plan in light of these developments.

The Company's liquidity remains strong. At December 31, 2006, in addition to its credit agreement, the Company had unrestricted cash on hand and undrawn amounts under the Thermo Funding Company irrevocable standby stock purchase agreement of approximately $195 million.

==== Globalstar's interim solution to premature first-generation satellite problems ====
In 2007, Globalstar launched eight spare satellites for its existing constellation with a view to reducing the gaps in its two-way voice and data services pending commercial availability of its second-generation satellite constellation. Globalstar continued to operate its failing satellite constellation to provide and support services on an intermittently-available until the second-generation Globalstar satellites became available for service.

Until the new second-generation Globalstar satellite constellation became operational, Globalstar offered its "Optimum Satellite Availability Tool" website, which subscribers could use to predict when one or more unaffected satellites would be overhead at a specific geographic location.

=== Second-generation satellites ===
In December 2006, Globalstar announced that Alcatel Alenia Space, now Thales Alenia Space in its Cannes headquarters, has been awarded a €661 million contract for the second-generation constellation. The satellites were designed with a life expectancy of 15 years, significantly longer than the design life of Globalstar's first-generation constellation. The second- generation constellation will consist of 24 satellites. In addition, Globalstar announced on April 3, 2007, that it has signed a €9 million agreement with Thales Alenia Space to upgrade the Globalstar satellite constellation, including necessary hardware and software upgrades to Globalstar's satellite control network facilities. In August 2008, Thales Alenia Space began production assembly, integration, and testing of the second-generation flight model satellites, in its Rome factory, for launch as early as Q3 2009. In July 2009, Globalstar, Inc. announced that it has received complete financing for its second-generation satellite constellation and signed an amendment to the initial contract, specifying in particular, the adjusted conditions for production and the new satellite delivery timetable.

The first six second-generation satellites were launched on October 19, 2010, from the Baikonur Cosmodrome in Kazakhstan. The launch used a Soyuz-2 launch vehicle with a Fregat upper stage. These second-generation satellites are expected to provide Globalstar customers with satellite voice and data services until at least 2025. Six more second-generation satellites were launched in July 2011 followed by another six satellites in December 2011. The launch of the second-generation constellation was completed on February 6, 2013, with the launch of the final six satellites using a Soyuz 2-1a launch vehicle. The 24 second-generation spacecraft weighed approximately 700 kg (1,500 lb) each at launch, and are 3-axis stabilized.

In February 2022, it was announced that Globalstar purchased 17 new satellites to continue its constellation built by MDA and Rocket Lab for $327 million. The satellites are expected to be launched by 2025. On June 19, 2022, a backup satellite for Globalstar was launched on a Falcon 9 rocket. This was the first Globalstar satellite to launch in over 9 years. Prior to the launch, Globalstar did not announce the mission, besides a vague quarterly report stating the satellite would launch.

On August 16, 2026, eight more Globalstar satellites were launched on a Falcon 9 rocket.

== Business operations ==
=== Corporate structure and financing ===
Predecessor company – Globalstar LP. In February 1995, Globalstar Telecommunications Ltd. raised $200 million from its initial public offering in the NASDAQ market. The IPO price of $20 per share was equivalent to $5 per share after two stock splits. The stock price peaked at (post-split) $50 per share in January 2000, but institutional investors began predicting bankruptcy as early as June 2000. The stock price eventually fell below $1 per share, and the stock was delisted by NASDAQ in June 2001.

After the IPO, the publicly traded Globalstar Telecommunications (NASDAQ symbol GSTRF) owned part of system operator Globalstar LP. From that point on, the primary financing for Globalstar LP was vendor financing from its suppliers (including Loral and Qualcomm), supplemented by junk bonds. After a total debt and equity investment of $4.3 billion, on February 15, 2002, Globalstar Telecommunications filed for Chapter 11 bankruptcy protection, listing assets of $570 million and liabilities of $3.3 billion. The assets were later bought for $43 million by Thermo Capital Partners LLC. Globalstar LLC and Globalstar, Inc. When the new Globalstar emerged from bankruptcy in April 2004, it was owned by Thermo Capital Partners (81.25%) and the original creditors of Globalstar L.P. (18.75%). Globalstar LLC was incorporated in April 2006 to become Globalstar, Inc. Globalstar, Inc. completed an IPO in November 2006. The stock currently trades on the Nasdaq under the symbol GSAT.

=== SPOT LLC ===
In August 2007, Globalstar announced the introduction of the SPOT Satellite Messenger product, to be marketed through its latest subsidiary SPOT, Inc., later named SPOT LLC. The SPOT Messenger is manufactured by Globalstar partner Axonn LLC and combines the company's simplex data technology with a Nemerix GPS chipset. SPOT is intended to leverage Globalstar's still adequate L-Band uplink, which is used by simplex modems. The product was launched in early November 2007. Subsequent launches included the SPOT Trace, SPOT X with Bluetooth and Gen4.

=== Collaboration with Apple, Inc. ===
Globalstar provides the infrastructure for the Emergency SOS via satellite functionality announced in 2022 for all versions of the iPhone 14 series and newer. Globalstar reserves 85% of its network capacity for the service, and previous to the announcement of the service, Globalstar invested in expanding its infrastructure, including "material upgrades to Globalstar’s ground network to enhance redundancy and coverage" and "construction of 10 new gateways around the world". In February 2023, Globalstar announced it would be repaying a $150 million debt under a 2019 agreement to EchoStar, which could have prevented the Apple partnership.

=== Employees ===
The first five employees of Globalstar were transferred from the founding companies in 1991. Although few figures were publicly disclosed, the company apparently reached a peak of about 350 employees until layoffs in March 2001. However, this figure was misleading, as most of the development, operations, and sales employees were employed by the company's strategic partners.

The company then appointed satellite telecommunications veteran Olof Lundberg to lead a turnaround at the company to serve as chairman and CEO. After beginning his career with Swedish Telecom, Lundberg had been founding Director General (later CEO) of Inmarsat from 1979 to 1995. He served as founding CEO and later CEO and chairman of ICO Global Communications from 1995 to 1999.

Lundberg resigned from the company (then in bankruptcy) on June 30, 2003.

Paul E. Jacobs was named CEO of Globalstar on Aug. 29, 2023, replacing David Kagan.

== See also ==
- Mobile-satellite service
- Satellite phone
- Broadband Global Area Network
- Gonets
- ICO Satellite Management
- Inmarsat
- Iridium Satellite LLC
- O3b Networks
- SkyWave Mobile Communications
- Starlink
- Teledesic
- TerreStar
- Thuraya
- Thales Alenia Space
- Orbcomm
