= O3b Networks =

Network service provider

O3b Networks Ltd. was a network communications service provider building and operating a medium Earth orbit (MEO) satellite constellation primarily intended to provide voice and data communications to mobile operators and Internet service providers. O3b Networks became a wholly owned subsidiary of SES in 2016 and the operator name was subsequently dropped in favour of SES Networks, a division of SES. The satellites themselves, now part of the SES fleet, continue to use the O3b name.

== Overview ==
The network combines the relatively large reach of satellite with high speed and medium latency to deliver satellite Internet services and mobile backhaul services to emerging markets. The name "O3b" stands for "Other 3 billion", referring to the population of the world where broadband Internet is not currently available.

Orbiting at an altitude of 8,062 kilometres (5,009 mi), less than one quarter of the altitude of geostationary satellites, the O3b satellite constellation of 20 Ka-band based satellites significantly reduces communication latency.

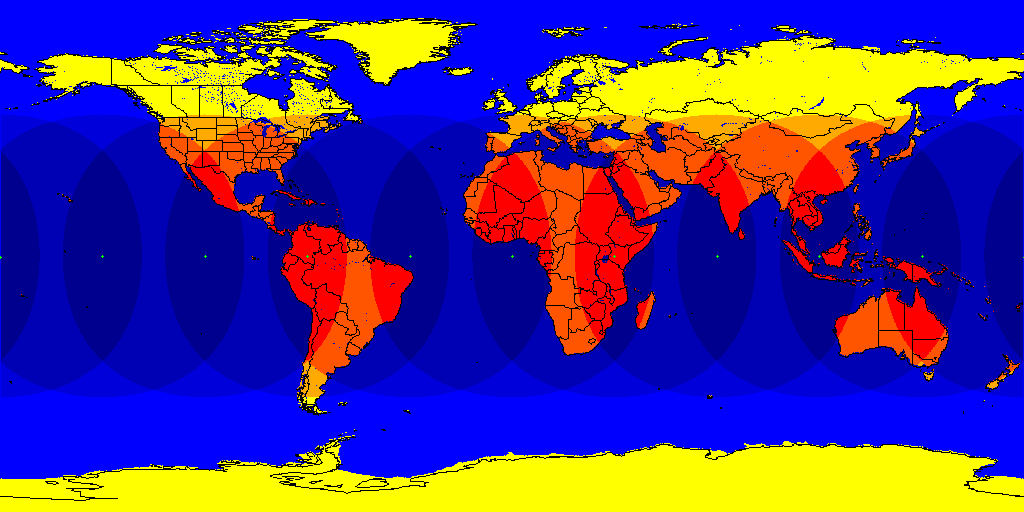
Rendering of O3b satellite coverage areas and visibility around the equator

After initially planning to launch in 2010, the first four satellites were launched on 25 June 2013. A second four satellites were launched in July 2014, and another four in December 2014 bringing the satellite constellation to 12 satellites. Three years later, four additional satellites were launched in March 2018, and in April 2019, the final four were launched to bring the constellation to 20 satellites, including the three current backup satellites which are used as in-orbit spares.

In September 2017, SES announced O3b mPOWER, the next generation of O3b satellites for broadband internet services, and placed an order for an initial seven from Boeing Satellite Systems. The O3b mPOWER constellation of MEO satellites would "be able to deliver anywhere from hundreds of megabits to 10 Gbits to any ship at sea" through 30,000 spot beams, with software-defined routing to direct traffic between the MEO satellites and SES' geostationary fleet. The number of O3b mPOWER satellites ordered was increased to 11 and then 13, and on 16 December 2022, the first two O3b mPOWER satellites were successfully launched, with four more in 2023, and the service began operations alongside the existing O3b constellation in April 2024. The seventh and eighth (upgraded) satellites were launched in December 2024, and began service in June 2025, increasing the constellation's capacity.

== Ownership ==
O3b was founded by Greg Wyler in 2007. The company was financially backed by SES, Google, HSBC, Liberty Global, Allen & Company, North Bridge Venture Partners, Soroof International, Development Bank of Southern Africa, Sofina and Satya Capital.

In April 2016, SES announced that (subject to regulatory approvals which were expected to be completed by the end of 2016) it would pay US$20 million to increase its fully diluted ownership of O3b from 49.1% to 50.5%, taking a controlling share in the company. In May 2016, SES said it would raise another US$710 million to purchase all of O3b Networks, exercising a call option with O3b minority shareholders and eliminating the possibility of an O3b stock offering, and then subsequently announced the completion of the capital raising and completion of the acquisition.

== History ==
Operators in the Cook Islands, Pakistan and Nigeria were among the first to prebook capacity on the O3b constellation to serve their respective markets.

O3b also announced the selection of Europe Media Port (EMP) the world's fastest-growing teleport in 2009 according to the World Teleport Association – to be the first provider of Gateway Teleport services for O3b's global network. O3b also announced a contract with Viasat for the production and installation of Ka-band infrastructure indicating significant progress in the deployment of O3b's Next Generation Network. The value of the Viasat contract is approximately US$47 million.

In 2011, once financial closure had been obtained, Mark Rigolle, former Chief Finance Officer of SES and O3b CEO since 2010, returned to SES. In his place, Steve Collar joined from SES World Skies where he had served as Senior Vice President of Business and Market Development and was formerly an O3b board member representing SES' interests. This change marks the 5th CEO for O3b in three years.

O3b has attracted investment interest with SES joining Google, Liberty Global, HSBC and North Bridge Venture Partners to the US$465 million buyer credit facility the company secured from Coface, the export credit agency acting on behalf of the French government.

O3b has also recently raised a total of US$1.2 billion to fully finance the construction of its satellites.

The first four satellites were launched on a Soyuz-2 / Fregat-MT rocket by Arianespace on 25 June 2013 at 19:27:03 UTC, and are currently in orbit and functioning properly. After discovering a hardware defect in the initial satellites, O3b postponed the planned September 2013 launch of four additional satellites so repairs could be made. The second four satellites were launched by the same type of rocket from the Space Center in French Guiana, on 10 July 2014. The third launch of four took place in December 2014.

In July 2014, SES Government Solutions (a subsidiary of O3b investor, SES and now SES Space & Defense) received approval to offer O3b services on their General Services Administration (GSA) schedule allowing SES GS to be the first distribution partner to offer O3b capability directly to the US Government.

In November 2014, MS Quantum of the Seas became the first cruise ship to provide fast internet to guests through O3b Networks. The service is branded "Voom" by its cruise line, Royal Caribbean International and it was subsequently rolled out to every ship in their fleet.

In August 2015, SES Government Solutions (now SES Space & Defense) agreed on a one-year contract with US government scientific agency, National Oceanic and Atmospheric Administration (NOAA) to supply O3b services and ground equipment to the National Weather Service Office in American Samoa, which will expand NOAA's broadband connectivity outside the continental United States to provide weather, water, and climate data, and forecasts and warnings to American Samoa.

In May 2016, SES said that O3b had a firm backlog of US$350 million, and revenue in 2016 was expected to exceed US$100 million, reaching around US$680 million in 2023.

In August 2016, SES Government Solutions (now SES Space & Defense) announced a contract to provide an O3b Networks high data rate satellite communications solution with very low signal travel time delays for a US Department of Defense end-user. The agreement is for a 365 days-per-year service consisting of a full-duplex symmetric 155 Mbit/s link, gateway access, a transportable 2.4 metre terminal, terrestrial backhaul, and maintenance and installation services, with a latency of under 200 milliseconds per round trip. The contract also provides for additional capacity to meet surge requirements.

Four additional satellites were launched on 9 March 2018 on a Soyuz-2.1b rocket from the Centre Spatial Guyanais, to join the existing constellation of 12. In December 2018, Thales Alenia Space said that tests on the final four O3b satellites would be completed by the end of January 2019 and the satellites would then be flown to the Guiana Space Centre for launch in March 2019. The four satellites were successfully launched on 4 April 2019.

== See also ==
- O3b
- SES
- Satellite phone
- Project Loon
- ASTRA2Connect
- ASTRA2Connect Maritime Broadband
- EchoStar Mobile
- Globalstar
- Gonets
- ICO Global Communications
- Inmarsat
- Iridium Satellite LLC
- Orbcomm
- SkyTerra
- SkyWave Mobile Communications
- TerreStar Corporation
