= Garuda 1 =

Indonesian communications satellite

- Mission type: Communication
- Operator: ACeS
- COSPAR ID: 2000-011A
- SATCAT no.: 26089
- Mission duration: 12 years (planned); 15 years (achieved)

Spacecraft properties
- Bus: A2100AXX
- Manufacturer: Lockheed Martin
- Launch mass: 4,500 kilograms (9,900 lb)

Start of mission
- Launch date: 12 February 2000
- Rocket: Proton-K/DM3
- Launch site: Baikonur 81/23
- Contractor: ILS

End of mission
- Disposal: Decommissioned
- Deactivated: Mid 2015

Orbital parameters
- Reference system: Geocentric
- Regime: Geostationary
- Longitude: 123° East

Transponders
- Band: 88 L-Band

Garuda 1 was an Indonesian communications satellite which is operated by ACeS. It was constructed by Lockheed Martin and is based on the A2100AXX satellite bus. It has two very large antennas, each measuring 12 meter in diameter. Launch occurred on 12 February 2000, at 09:10:54 GMT. The launch was contracted by ILS, and used a Proton-K/DM3 carrier rocket flying from Site 81/23 at the Baikonur Cosmodrome.

== History ==
At the time of its launch, it was the heaviest commercial payload to be launched by a Proton. During its launch, the Block DM3 upper stage made three burns instead of the usual two. This was the first time that the Block DM had used a three-burn ascent profile.

Following its launch and on-orbit testing, it was placed in geostationary orbit at 123° East, from where it provides communications services to Asia. It is equipped with 88 transponders, allowing it to cover the entire continent with 140 spot beams. The satellite is controlled by ACeS Satellite Control Facility situated in Batam island, Indonesia.

The Garuda 1 was originally to be supplemented by a second satellite (Garuda 2), but the plan never materialized.

An anomaly with some of the antennae was discovered in September 2000, and significantly reduced the satellite's communications capacity. A few years later more anomalies were found, further reducing its capacity by more than 50%. Several curative actions have been taken by ACeS engineers to salvage the satellite and it is expected to survive another 5–7 years.

In mid-2015, the satellite experienced another malfunction, making it in unusable state. After the malfunction, the satellite was finally retired and was moved into a graveyard orbit.
