= Olof Lundberg =

Swedish engineer

Olof Ingemar Lundberg (born 9 December 1943) was a Swedish business executive and a prominent figure in the mobile satellite services industry. He served as founding Director General and then CEO of Inmarsat (the International Maritime Satellite Organisation), a non-profit intergovernmental organisation created to establish and operate a satellite communications network for the maritime community, from 1979 to 1995; founding chairman and CEO of ICO Global Communications 1995-2000; and Chairman and CEO of Globalstar 2001-2003.

== Early life ==
Lundberg was born in Gothenburg, Sweden, on 9 December 1943. He went to school at Hvitfeldtska gymnasiet and studied electrical engineering at Chalmers University of Technology.

== Career ==
Lundberg started his career as an engineer at Televerket (the Swedish Telecoms Administration), working there between 1967 and 1979. During that time, he developed Maritex, and automated HF Telex System.

In 1979, he was appointed the first Director General and then as CEO of Inmarsat (the International Maritime Satellite Organisation), where he served until 1995, leading the development of mobile satellite communications at sea, on land, and in the air.

Lundberg was Chairman and CEO of ICO Global Communications 1995-2000 and Chairman and CEO of Globalstar 2001-2003.

Lundberg has received the CCIR Award d'Honneur and the ITU Gold Medal. He was awarded the Arthur C Clarke Award and has twice received the Aviation Week and Space Technology Laureate Award and been inducted into their Hall of Fame. He received the Mobile Satellite User's Association (MSUA) Pioneer Award in 2009. He has received the Thulin Medal and the Tsiolkovsky Medal and is inducted to the SSPI Hall of Fame.

== Personal life ==
Lundberg is an amateur radio enthusiast. He was inducted into the CQ Amateur Radio Hall of Fame in 2015. He lives in England.
