= ACeS =

ACeS (PT Asia Cellular Satellite) was a regional satellite telecommunications company based in Jakarta, Indonesia. It offered GSM-like satellite telephony services to Asian market. The coverage area included Indonesia, Malaysia, Thailand, Philippines, Sri Lanka, Vietnam, China and India. The company operated the Garuda 1 satellite, launched on February 12, 2000. A second satellite (Garuda 2) was planned but never materialized. ACeS was formed by a joint venture of PT Pasifik Satelit Nusantara (PSN), Lockheed Martin Global Telecommunication (LMGT), Jasmine International Overseas Ltd of Thailand and Philippine Long Distance Telephone Co. (PLDT). ACeS services were marketed by National Service Providers (NSPs) in six countries; PT. Pasifik Satelit Nusantara in Indonesia, ACeS Regional Services in Thailand, Smart ACeS in the Philippines, TMTouch/Celcom in Malaysia, AVCO in Nepal and Mobitel in Sri Lanka.

In 2015, following the cessation of commercial services, the Garuda 1 satellite was officially decommissioned and moved into a graveyard orbit after 15 years of service.

The satellite started under GE Aerospace in East Winsor, New Jersey. In 1993, the group was sold to Martin Marietta, however in 1995 Martin Marietta merged with Lockheed to form Lockheed Martin. This moved work to Sunnyvale, California.

The satellite and most network operations were controlled by ACeS Network Control Center in Batam Island, Indonesia. The NSPs operated ground stations which provided links to the terrestrial telephone networks.

ACeS has been assigned the virtual country code +88220, an international networks code rather than a GMSS code as the system does not operate globally. The company currently supplies only one handset type, the Ericsson R190, which derived many components from GH688 model. R190 is a dual-mode Satellite/GSM phone which automatically switches to satellite mode when terrestrial GSM network is not available. It accepts standard GSM SIM cards, and since ACeS has international roaming agreements with many GSM networks worldwide, the phone can be used in virtually any country. The handset supports most standard services such as call forward and call waiting but does not support short message service (SMS) in satellite mode. The demise of Ericsson mobile phone business in 2001 has left ACeS with no other handset available to offer to its customers. As Ericsson left the mobile phone business, production of the R190 was then continued by ACeS and rebranded to be the ACeS R190. Additionally ACeS has developed a land phone version, the ACeS FR-190, that allowed many villages and rural areas throughout Asia access to basic telephony services.

At its conception, ACeS network was designed to serve up to 2 million subscribers. It aimed for markets unserved by regular terrestrial cellular networks, such as rural areas, forestry, mining and marine industries. However, sales grew slowly and after five years of operation ACeS had fewer than 20,000 subscribers. The company failed to attract more customers, and eventually it was considered by many as a commercial failure. In 2014 ACeS ceased operation altogether.

== See also ==
- Mobile-satellite service
- Satellite phone
- GEO-Mobile Radio Interface
- O3b Networks
