= Global Mobile Satellite System =

The Global Mobile Satellite System (GMSS) consists of several satellite phone providers serving private customers. It can be compared to PLMN (wireless telephony carriers) and PSTN (traditional wire-based telephony).

As of 2023, ranges of numbers have been assigned to two GMSS carriers:

- Iridium Satellite LLC
- Globalstar

In 1996, the ITU introduced country code +881 for direct international dialing of phones on GMSS providers. (Inmarsat had already been allocated country code +870.) The next digit following the country code is allocated (two at a time) to a particular GMSS carrier:

Carrier	GMSS codes
spare (formerly ICO)	+881 0 +881 1
spare (formerly Ellipso)	+881 2 +881 3
spare	+881 4 +881 5
Iridium	+881 6 +881 7
Globalstar	+881 8 +881 9

== Satellite numbers outside the GMSS country code ==
Inmarsat is a satellite-based communications provider, but it is primarily a maritime service and is not generally considered part of the GMSS.

Globalstar usually allocates subscribers with a local number in the country they are based rather than using their GMSS country code.

Iridium also uses an Arizona-based access number to call Iridium phones for those unwilling or unable to call the usually expensive GMSS number directly.

Thuraya has been assigned +882-16, within the +882 range for International Networks.
