= International Mobile Satellite Organization =

International organisation

International Mobile Satellite Organization (IMSO) is the oversight body of the satellite communications elements of the Global Maritime Distress and Safety System (GMDSS) established by the International Maritime Organization (IMO) designed to provide a worldwide system for automated emergency signal communication for ships at sea. IMSO the provision of maritime mobile satellite communications services, currently provided by two companies: Inmarsat and Iridium.

== History ==
=== INMARSAT ===
The International Maritime Satellite Organization (INMARSAT) was established under the auspices of the International Maritime Organization by the Convention on the International Maritime Satellite Organization, signed at London on 3 September 1976 and entered into force on 16 July 1979. The organization was modeled after Intelsat, an international consortium which provided satellite communications among the member countries. The Communications Satellite Corporation (COMSAT), a founding member of Intelsat, took the lead in the founding of Inmarsat. In coordination with the International Civil Aviation Organization in the 1980s, the convention governing INMARSAT was amended to include improvements in aeronautical communications, notably for public safety.

The first Director General was appointed in January 1980 and operations began in 1982. Olof Lundberg, who had previously managed and developed mobile and specialized services at Swedish Telecom (now Telia), served as Director General and CEO until 1995.

=== IMSO ===
In the mid-1990s, there was contrasting views among member states for the agency's future. There was a growing realization among the member states that the organization's business assets needed to be privatized, mainly because of the competitive nature of the satellite communication industry and the unwillingness of many member states to invest money into INMARSAT to improve its network. There were also many which believed in the importance of maintaining the organization's role in overseeing maritime satellite communication. The issue was resolved in a session in April 1998, which resulted in the amendment of the Convention on the International Mobile Satellite Organization, in which the operational assets would be split and privatized while the agency would continue as a regulatory organization.

On 15 April 1999, INMARSAT became the International Mobile Satellite Organization (IMSO). At the time, the operational assets of INMARSAT were separated to become Inmarsat Ltd., a private UK-based company which agreed to inherit, overseen by the IMSO, certain public safety obligations related to the satellite system's operation.

An agreement between the International Civil Aviation Organization (ICAO) and the IMSO was signed in Montreal, Canada, on 20 September 2000 and addresses the relationship between ICAO and IMSO. As of November 2018, Inmarsat has 103 state parties that represent approximately 95 per cent of the gross tonnage of the world's merchant fleet.
