= SPOT Satellite Messenger =

Globalstar GPS Device

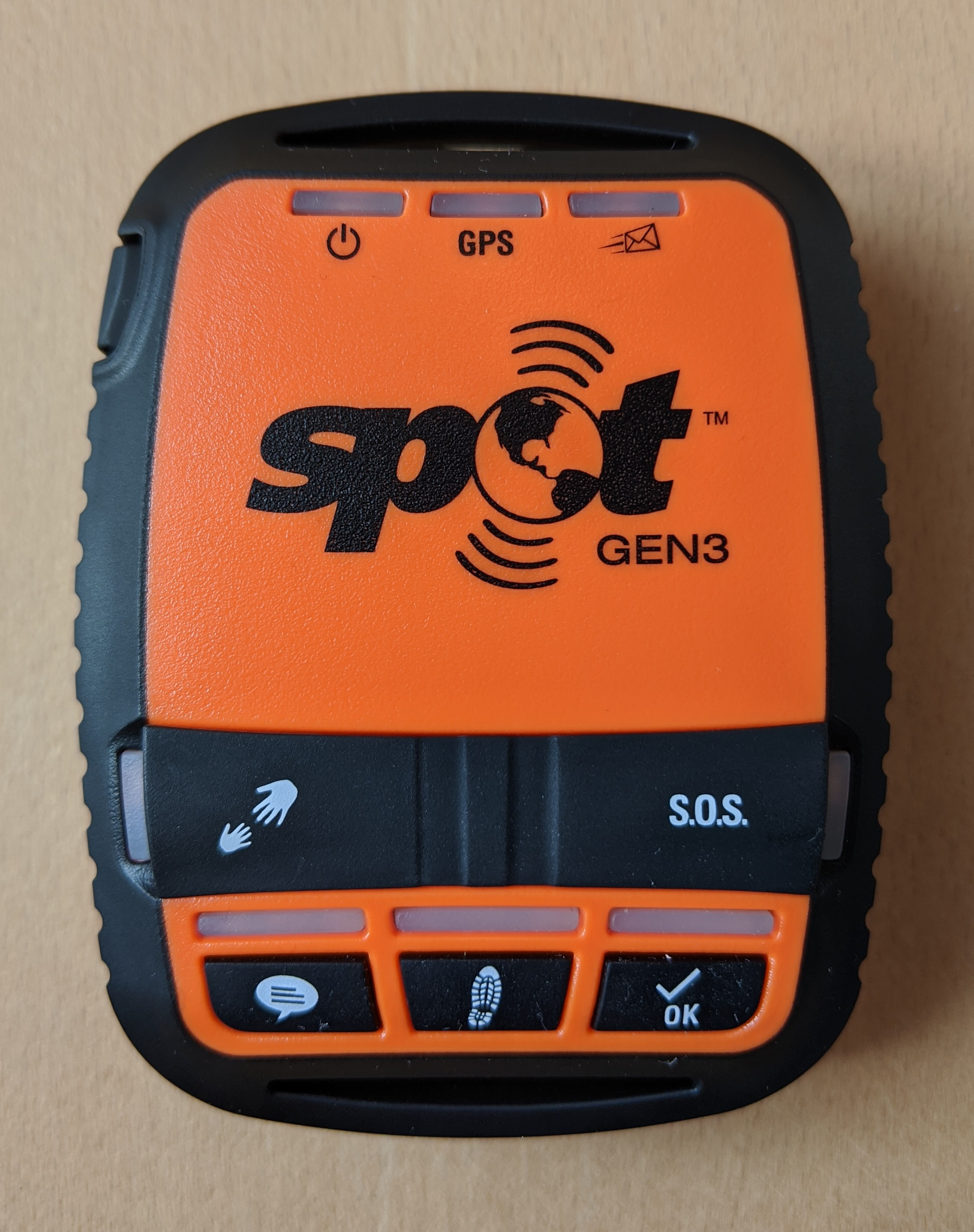
SPOT Gen3 Satellite Messenger

SPOT is a GPS tracking device that uses the Globalstar satellite network to provide text messaging and GPS tracking (depending on the subscription type purchased). It has a coverage area that includes a large portion of the planet, with the exception of extreme northern and southern latitudes and parts of the Pacific Ocean. Depending on the product, SPOT can send and receive communications.

== Overview ==
The device is sold by SPOT LLC, a subsidiary of Globalstar.

With the purchase of a subscription, SPOT allows short (41 character) user-defined text messages which can be sent to a list of telephone numbers and e-mail addresses. This subscription also allows users to push their location to emergency services. Users can share their location and messages based on their account preference, alerting friends and family to their whereabouts.

In early 2018, SPOT launched the SPOT X, a two-way satellite messaging device with GPS location tracking, navigational capabilities, social media linking and direct communication options to emergency services. In February 2023, Kurt Knutsson of CyberGuy Report at Fox News included Spot X in a review of "the 5 best" personal locator beacons (PLB).

As of 2019, SPOT has successfully helped initiate more than 6,000 rescues in 100 countries.
