= A Human Right =

- Formation: 2010
- Founder: Kosta Grammatis
- Dissolved: 2016
- Type: Non-profit organization
- Region served: World-wide
- Key people: Nigel Seale, Noah Samara, Thomas Curran
- Website: ahumanright.org

A Human Right is a non-profit organization dedicated to providing free basic internet and phone access to developing countries, and to citizens of countries whose government has cut off or restricted internet access. It was discontinued in 2016.

== Buy This Satellite ==
In December 2010 they launched Buy This Satellite, a fundraising effort to purchase the TerreStar-1 communications satellite, after its owner, TerreStar Corporation, filed for bankruptcy. The idea to purchase the satellite developed out of a meeting in Berlin of thirty people under the age of thirty, described by A Human Right's founder, Kosta Grammatis, as a "do tank" (as opposed to a think tank). A Human Right hopes that providing internet access to impoverished regions of the world would help to solve many of their problems, such as shortages of food, potable water, and health care. Grammatis believes that, "People are ingenious. If you give people access to information, they can solve their own problems."

Internet and phone access to citizens of countries whose government has shut down all communications is another benefit proposed by A Human Right. This was inspired by the 2011 Egyptian protests, where the government shut down internet and phone access to its citizens.

The goal of A Human Right is to have a satellite in geosynchronous orbit over Africa, which would provide free internet access to African nations. A Human Right intends to pay for the operation of the satellite through buying and reselling high-speed bandwidth while providing low-bandwidth internet for free. They are also working on developing an open-source, low-cost modem as part of providing internet access to those who can't currently pay for it.

== Move This Cable ==
SAex (South Atlantic Express) is a proposed submarine communications cable that will link South Africa and Angola to Brazil, with onward connectivity to the United States. The cable route, as originally planned, was to narrowly miss the remote island of Saint Helena, a British Overseas Territory.

The project was successful and in mid-2012 the cable's path was changed.
