= TerreStar-1 =

- Mission type: Communication
- Operator: TerreStar Corporation
- COSPAR ID: 2009-035A
- SATCAT no.: 35496
- Mission duration: 15 years

Spacecraft properties
- Bus: LS-1300S
- Manufacturer: Space Systems Loral
- Launch mass: 6,910 kilograms (15,230 lb)

Start of mission
- Launch date: 1 July 2009, 17:52 UTC
- Rocket: Ariane 5ECA
- Launch site: Kourou ELA-3
- Contractor: Arianespace

Orbital parameters
- Reference system: Geocentric
- Regime: Geostationary
- Longitude: 111° West
- Perigee altitude: 35,778 kilometers (22,231 mi)
- Apogee altitude: 35,806 kilometers (22,249 mi)
- Inclination: 4.00 degrees
- Period: 23.93 hours
- Epoch: 21 January 2014, 09:03:45 UTC

Transponders
- Band: E/F-band
- Coverage area: Canada; United States

TerreStar-1 is an American communications satellite which was operated by TerreStar Corporation. It was constructed by Space Systems/Loral, based on the LS-1300S bus, and carries E/F band (IEEE S band) transponders which are used to provide mobile communications to North America. The signals are transmitted by an 18-metre (59 ft) reflector on the satellite. It had a launch mass of 6,910 kilograms (15,230 lb), making it the second most massive single satellite launched into a geosynchronous transfer orbit, and the second largest commercial communications satellite ever built. Its record as the most massive communication satellite was surpassed by Telstar 19V launched on Falcon 9 on July 21, 2018, with a mass of 7,076 kilograms (15,600 lb).

TerreStar was launched at 17:52 GMT on July 1, 2009, during a two-hour launch window that opened at 16:13. The launch occurred towards the end of the window due to bad weather in the first hour, followed by two aborted countdowns for launch attempts scheduled at 17:12 and 17:34. The launch was conducted by Arianespace, and used an Ariane 5ECA carrier rocket, flying from ELA-3 at the Guiana Space Centre. After launch, the satellite separated from the carrier rocket into a geosynchronous transfer orbit. It subsequently raised itself into geostationary orbit by means of its onboard propulsion system. It is positioned at 111° West longitude, and is expected to operate for 15 years. A second satellite, TerreStar-2 (now EchoStar XXI), was launched on 2017, positioned at 10E, and owned by Echostar.

Following TerreStar's filing for Chapter 11 bankruptcy, a movement formed by the NGO A Human Right to purchase TerreStar-1 and to use it to provide free basic Internet access to developing countries. The team was looking for US$150,000 in donations to put the first phase of their plan into action.

However, Dish Network outbid others in the bankruptcy-court auction, acquiring TerreStar-1 for $1.375 billion. With this acquisition, Dish Network sought to utilize the satellite's wireless spectrum to offer its own wireless broadband service, and asked the Federal Communications Commission to let the company use the wireless spectrum of TerreStar to offer its own wireless broadband service on August 22, 2011.
