= TerreStar Networks =

Mobile communications provider

TerreStar Networks, a majority owned subsidiary of TerreStar Corporation (TSTR), operated as a wholesale mobile communications provider focused on integrated satellite terrestrial services and hybrid satellite-terrestrial mobile devices.

== Overview ==
TerreStar was to provide a fully integrated satellite and terrestrial mobile network. This network would leverage TerreStar's S band mobile satellite service (MSS) spectrum with an all–IP ground-based open-architecture terrestrial network to provide voice, data and video services to end-users – from government officials and emergency first responders to adventure enthusiasts and consumers in rural communities.

TerreStar used commercial chipset technologies from Qualcomm and Infineon to embed satellite communications capabilities into smartphones that can be carried as everyday phones. Genus was the world's first (and only) Windows Mobile-based quad-band GSM and tri-band WCDMA/HSPA smartphone with integrated all-IP satellite-terrestrial voice and data capabilities, a touch screen and a full QWERTY keyboard. It resembled the now classic Blackberry design with a keyboard under the screen, used an internal antenna for terrestrial communications but required a rather large antenna for satellite communications.

== World's Largest Satellite ==
On July 1, 2009, from French Guiana in South America, TerreStar launched its geosynchronous satellite, TerreStar-1. TerreStar-1 is the world's largest and most advanced commercial communications satellite that will provide communications services across the continental United States, Canada, Puerto Rico, U.S. Virgin Islands, Hawaii and Alaska. The satellite's size along with the extra power and sensitivity of its antenna allows it to communicate to conventionally sized mobile devices.

On July 14, 2009, TerreStar-1 successfully reached its orbital slot (at 111 degrees) in the geosynchronous arc and successfully deployed its 18-meter 2 GHz S Band reflector. On July 20, 2009, TerreStar completed the first end-to-end satellite-terrestrial phone call over TerreStar-1.

== Bankruptcy ==
On October 19, 2010, TerreStar Networks Inc filed for Chapter 11 bankruptcy. On February 16, 2011, TerreStar Corporation filed for Chapter 11 bankruptcy protection. On March 29, 2012, the bankruptcy reorganization became effective and all common shares were cancelled with no value. The company was sold out of bankruptcy to Dish Network Corp.
