= EchoStar XXI =

Communications satellite

- Mission type: Communication
- Operator: EchoStar Corporation
- COSPAR ID: 2017-032A
- SATCAT no.: 42749
- Mission duration: Planned: 15+ years Elapsed: 8 years, 9 months, 2 days

Spacecraft properties
- Bus: SSL 1300
- Manufacturer: Space Systems Loral
- Launch mass: 6,871 kilograms (15,148 lb)

Start of mission
- Launch date: 8 June 2017, 03:45 UTC
- Rocket: ILS Proton Breeze M
- Launch site: Baikonur Cosmodrome
- Contractor: International Launch Services

Orbital parameters
- Reference system: Geocentric
- Regime: Geostationary
- Longitude: 10.25° East
- Perigee altitude: 35,784.4 kilometers (22,235.4 mi)
- Apogee altitude: 35,801.8 kilometers (22,246.2 mi)
- Inclination: 6.8 degrees
- Period: 23.93 hours
- Epoch: 22 July 2018, 15:03 UTC

Transponders
- Band: S-band
- Coverage area: Europe

EchoStar XXI (formerly known as TerreStar 2) is a European communications satellite which is operated by Echostar Corporation. It was constructed by Space Systems/Loral, based on the SSL 1300 satellite bus, and carries S band transponders which will be used to provide 2 GHz mobile connectivity throughout Europe.

EchoStar XXI was launched at 03:45 UTC on June 8, 2017 from the Baikonur Cosmodrome in Kazakhstan. This satellite was the heaviest commercial payload flown aboard a Russian booster at the time of its launch.

Before being launched, the satellite was known as TerreStar-2, a ground spare for TerreStar Networks' satellite-terrestrial telephone network.
