= EchoStar Mobile =

Irish satellite operator

EchoStar Mobile Limited
- Type: Subsidiary
- Industry: Telecommunications
- Founded: 2008; 18 years ago
- Headquarters: Dublin, Ireland
- Products: Non-Terrestrial Networks (NTN)
- Website: echostarmobile.com

EchoStar Mobile Limited is a satellite communications company headquartered in Dublin, Ireland, with commercial operations and a data centre in Griesheim, Germany. It is a subsidiary of EchoStar Corporation, a provider of satellite communications devices. EchoStar Mobile provides non-terrestrial network (NTN) connectivity services, with a primary focus on enabling Internet of Things (IoT) applications through LoRa®-based and mobile satellite solutions. Its network is designed to extend coverage beyond the reach of terrestrial communications, supporting industries such as agriculture, environmental monitoring, infrastructure, and utilities and asset tracking throughout Europe.

== History ==
EchoStar Mobile Limited was established in 2008 as Solaris Mobile, a joint venture company between SES and Eutelsat Communications to develop and commercialize the first geostationary satellite systems in Europe for broadcasting video, radio and data to in-vehicle receivers and to mobile devices, such as mobile phones, portable media players and PDAs.

The agreement to set up Solaris Mobile was reached in 2006 with the company formed in 2008. SES and Eutelsat – both successful European satellite operators, providing TV and other services from geostationary satellites to millions of cable and direct-to-home viewers – invested €130m in the venture. The services to be developed included video, radio, multimedia data, interactive services, and voice communications, with the primary aim of delivering mobile television any time, anywhere. Its headquarters is in Dublin, Ireland.

Solaris Mobile's first commercial contract was with Italian media publishing group Class Editori, to launch a digital radio service in Italy. A hybrid satellite/terrestrial network will initially be deployed in Milan, in October 2011 and extended across the country in 2012. Solaris claims that the network will enable Italians to access dozens of new digital radio channels broadcasting music, news, entertainment and sports, in their original format with continuity of reception across the entire country, and that the digital audio signal will be complemented with new visual media services such as programme information and traffic data.

In January 2014, EchoStar Corporation acquired all shares of Solaris Mobile, and the company was renamed EchoStar Mobile Limited in March 2015. In June 2017, EchoStar launched the EchoStar XXI satellite to provide S-band mobile satellite services (MSS) across Europe, forming the foundation for the company’s later Internet of Things (IoT) and non-terrestrial network (NTN) offerings.

From 2020 onwards, EchoStar Mobile shifted its focus toward NTN connectivity for IoT. The company developed a pan-European LoRa®-enabled IoT network operating in licensed S-band spectrum through EchoStar XXI7, and in 2024 introduced the LoRaWAN® Satellite Relay (EM-SR) to extend coverage to sensors without a direct line-of-sight to satellites. Also in 2024, industry analysts recognised EchoStar Mobile for its role in pioneering NTN IoT connectivity in Europe.

On June 6, 2025, it was reported that EchoStar Corporation was preparing to file for Chapter 11 bankruptcy protection after the Federal Communications Commission (FCC) suspended EchoStar's ability to plan out strategic decisions for its Boost Mobile subsidiary. In addition, other factors contributing to this decision included missing over $500 million in interest payments and the termination of the Dish Network acquisition by DirecTV.

=== Services and Applications ===
EchoStar Mobile delivers a range of satellite connectivity services across Europe using its licensed S-band spectrum, offering non-terrestrial network (NTN) solutions that include both mobile satellite services (MSS) and Internet of Things (IoT) connectivity.

The company provides mobile satellite services (MSS) as a foundational offering, delivering voice and packet-data connectivity for users operating outside terrestrial mobile coverage. These hybrid satellite and terrestrial network services are designed for commercial wholesalers seeking mission-critical communications, mobile data transfer, and remote monitoring across sectors such as agriculture, maritime, critical infrastructure monitoring and emergency response.

Building on its MSS capabilities, EchoStar Mobile expanded into non-terrestrial network (NTN) connectivity for the Internet of Things (IoT). Its pan-European LoRa®-enabled IoT network, introduced in 2022, uses the EchoStar XXI geostationary satellite to enable bi-directional, real-time direct sensor-to-satellite communications in the licensed S-band spectrum. The service supports industries including utilities, transportation, railway, logistics and agritech, providing coverage in remote and mobile environments where terrestrial networks are unavailable.

The company also offers the LoRaWAN® Satellite Relay (EM-SR), a compact plug-and-play device that enables IoT sensors without a direct line-of-sight to satellites, such as those located indoors, in basements, or in obstructed areas, to connect via a local relay node.

=== Technology ===
EchoStar Mobile leverages the EchoStar XXI geostationary satellite, operating in the licensed S-band spectrum, as the technical basis for both its mobile satellite services (MSS) and non-terrestrial network (NTN) IoT connectivity.

EchoStar Mobile provides the following LoRa®-enabled satellite IoT devices:

- EM2050 OEM Module: A dual-mode module embedding both licensed S-band (satellite) and sub‑GHz ISM (terrestrial) LoRa capabilities, switching between satellite and terrestrial networks as needed.
- EM2050-EVK Evaluation Kit: A development platform allowing integrators to prototype and test IoT solutions using EchoStar Mobile’s direct-to-satellite LoRa® network.
- EMAS100 Antenna: A compact, omnidirectional PCB antenna designed for integration into IoT devices, optimising performance within the licensed S-band environment.
- LoRaWAN® Satellite Relay (EM-SR): A plug-and-play relay device that enables IoT sensors without a direct line-of-sight to satellites, such as those located indoors, in basements, or behind obstructions, to connect via a local relay node.

These satellite IoT devices support bi-directional, real-time satellite connectivity with low power requirements, for small, battery-powered IoT devices operating in remote or mobile environments.

EchoStar Mobile also enables two-way hybrid connectivity by collaborating with The LoRa Alliance ecosystem partners, such as Actility, enabling dual-transport, generic LoRaWAN nodes to operate seamlessly over terrestrial or satellite links.

=== Regulatory ===
On June 30, 2008 the European Parliament and the Council adopted the European's Decision to establish a single selection and authorisation process to ensure a coordinated introduction of mobile satellite services (MSS) in Europe. The selection process was launched in August 2008 and attracted four applications by prospective operators (ICO, Inmarsat, Solaris Mobile, TerreStar).

In May 2009, the European Commission selected two operators, Inmarsat Ventures and Solaris Mobile, giving these operators "the right to use the specific radio frequencies identified in the Commission's decision and the right to operate their respective mobile satellite systems". EU Member States now have to ensure that the two operators have the right to use the specific radio frequencies identified in the commission's decision and the right to operate their respective mobile satellite systems for 18 years from the selection decision. The operators are compelled to start operations within 24 months from the selection decision.

Following the acquisition of Solaris Mobile by EchoStar in 2014, EchoStar Mobile continues to operate under this authorisation, enabling it to provide S-band satellite IoT services across Europe.

== See also ==
- DVB-SH
- EchoStar Corporation
- SES
- Eutelsat
- S-band
