= S band =

Frequency range

IEEE S band
- Frequency range: 2 – 4 GHz
- Wavelength range: 15 – 7.5 cm
- Related bands: E / F bands (NATO); UHF / SHF (ITU)

The S band is a designation by the Institute of Electrical and Electronics Engineers (IEEE) for a part of the microwave band of the electromagnetic spectrum covering frequencies from 2 to 4 gigahertz (GHz). Thus it crosses the conventional boundary between the UHF and SHF bands at 3.0 GHz. The S band is used by airport surveillance radar for air traffic control, weather radar, surface ship radar, and some communications satellites, particularly satellites used by NASA to communicate with the Space Shuttle, SLS launch vehicle and the International Space Station. The 10 cm radar short-band ranges roughly from 1.55 to 5.2 GHz.

The S band also contains the 2.4–2.483 GHz ISM band, widely used for low power unlicensed microwave devices such as cordless phones, wireless headphones (Bluetooth), garage door openers, keyless vehicle locks, baby monitors as well as for medical diathermy machines and microwave ovens (typically at 2.495 GHz). One of its largest uses is 2.4 GHz IEEE 802.11 Wi-Fi wireless networks, allowing smartphones, laptops, printers and TVs to connect to the internet without cables.

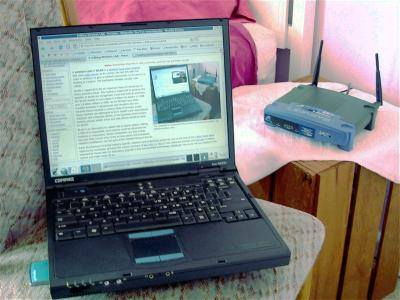
The largest use of this band is for Wi-Fi networks, allowing devices like laptops (left) to connect to the internet through a router (right)

== Wi-Fi ==
The largest use of this band is by Wi-Fi networks; the IEEE 802.11b and 802.11g standards use the 2.4 GHz section of the S band. These are the most widely used computer networks in the world, used globally in home and small office networks to link desktop and laptop computers, tablet computers, smartphones, smart TVs, printers, and smart speakers together and to a wireless router to connect them to the Internet, and in wireless access points in public places like coffee shops, hotels, libraries and airports to provide public Internet access for mobile devices.

== Mobile services ==
Mobile services are operated in the 2.3 GHz to 2.6 GHz range, specifically between the 2300–2400 MHz band and the 2500–2690 MHz band. Spectrum in the 3.55–3.7 GHz band has been auctioned off in the United States to be used for CBRS services and spectrum between 3.45–3.55 GHz and 3.7–3.98 GHz has been auctioned off by the FCC for 5G although this spectrum is referred to as C Band by the agency.

== Satellite communications ==
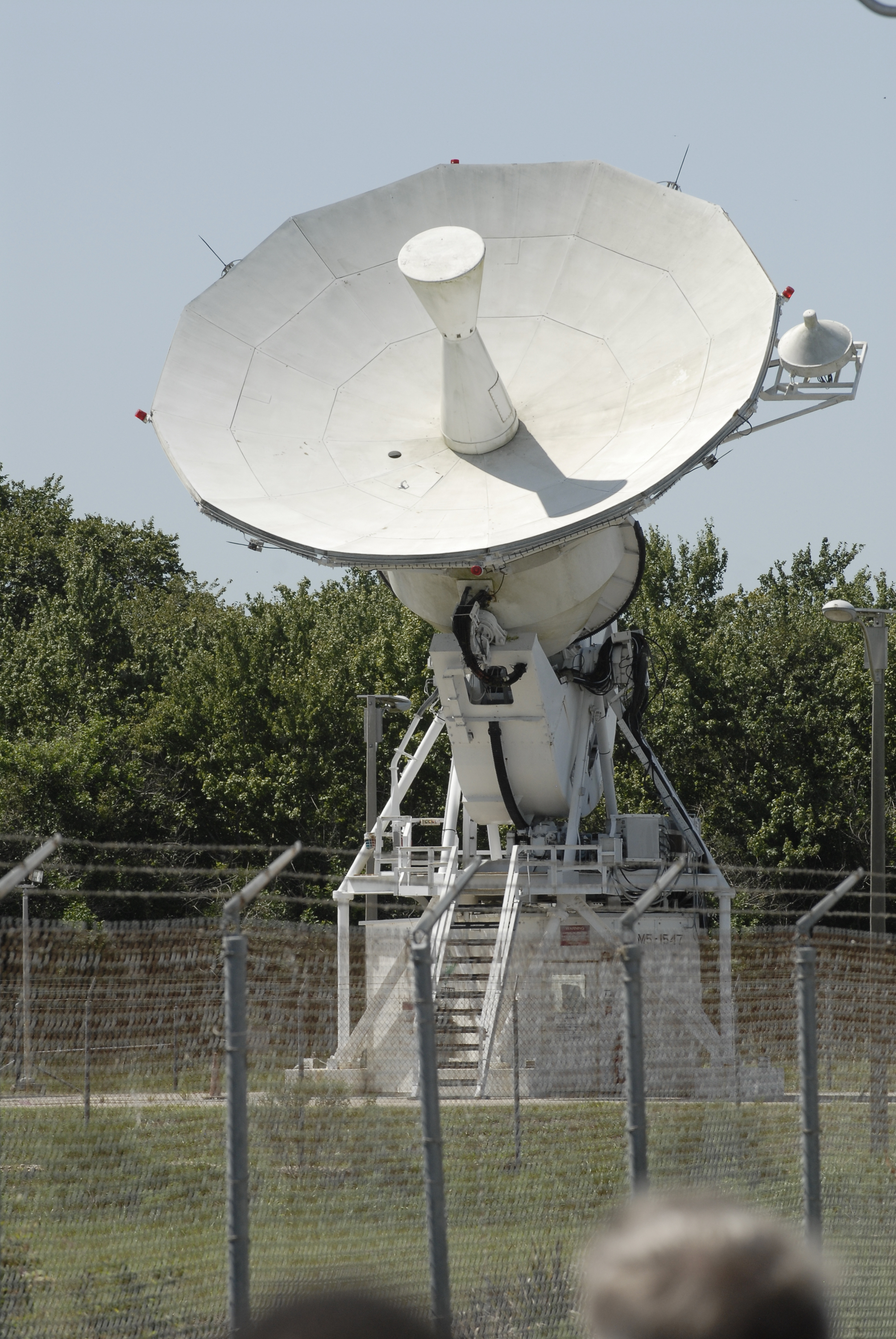
S-band tracking antenna at Kennedy Space Center

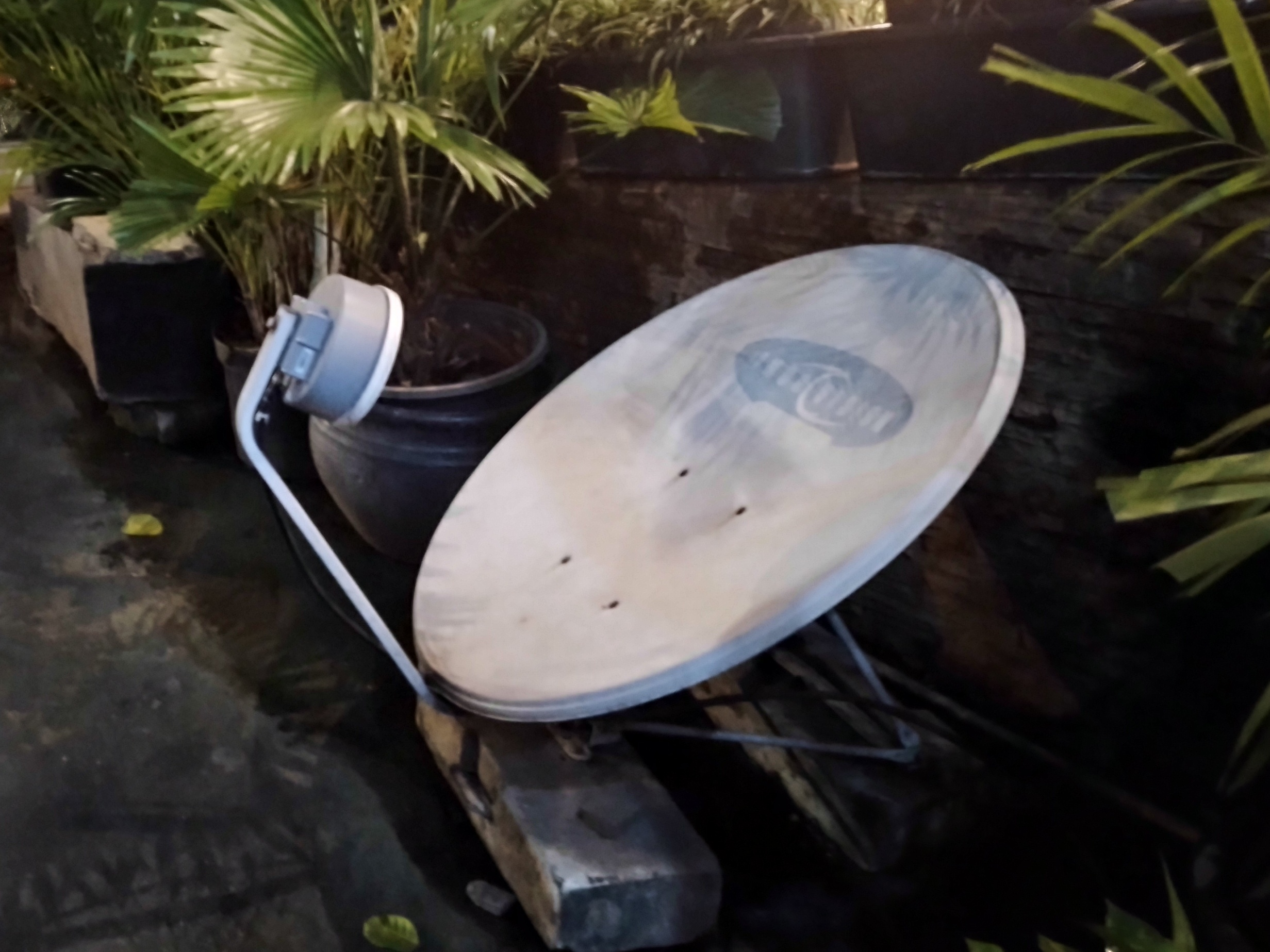
A Indovision 80cm S-band satellite dish

In the United States, the FCC approved satellite-based Digital Audio Radio Service (DARS) broadcasting in the S band from 2.31 to 2.36 GHz in 1995, used by Sirius XM Radio. More recently, it has approved portions of the S band between 2.0 and 2.2 GHz for the creation of Mobile Satellite Service (MSS) networks in connection with Ancillary Terrestrial Components (ATC). There have been a number of companies attempting to deploy such networks, including ICO Satellite Management (now Pendrell Corporation) and TerreStar (defunct).

The 2.6 GHz range is used for China Multimedia Mobile Broadcasting, a satellite radio and mobile TV standard which, as with proprietary systems in the United States, is incompatible with the open standards used in the rest of the world.

In May 2009, Inmarsat and Solaris Mobile (a joint venture between Eutelsat and SES (EchoStar Mobile)) were each awarded a 2×15 MHz portion of the S band by the European Commission. The two companies are allowed two years to start providing pan-European MSS services for 18 years. Allocated frequencies are 1.98 to 2.01 GHz for Earth to space communications, and from 2.17 to 2.2 GHz for space to Earth communications. The Eutelsat W2A satellite was launched in April 2009 and is located at 10° East.

In Indonesia, S band is used by Indovision for Direct-to-Home satellite television (unlike similar services in most countries, which use K_{u} band). The frequency allocated for this service is 2.52-2.67 GHz (LOF 1.570 GHz).

IndoStar-1 was the world's first commercial communications satellite to use S-band frequencies for broadcast, which efficiently penetrate the atmosphere and provide high-quality transmissions to small-diameter 80 cm antennas in regions that experience heavy rainfall such as Indonesia. A similar Ku- or C-band reception performance requires greater transmission power or a much larger dish to penetrate the moist atmosphere.

=== Deep space communications ===
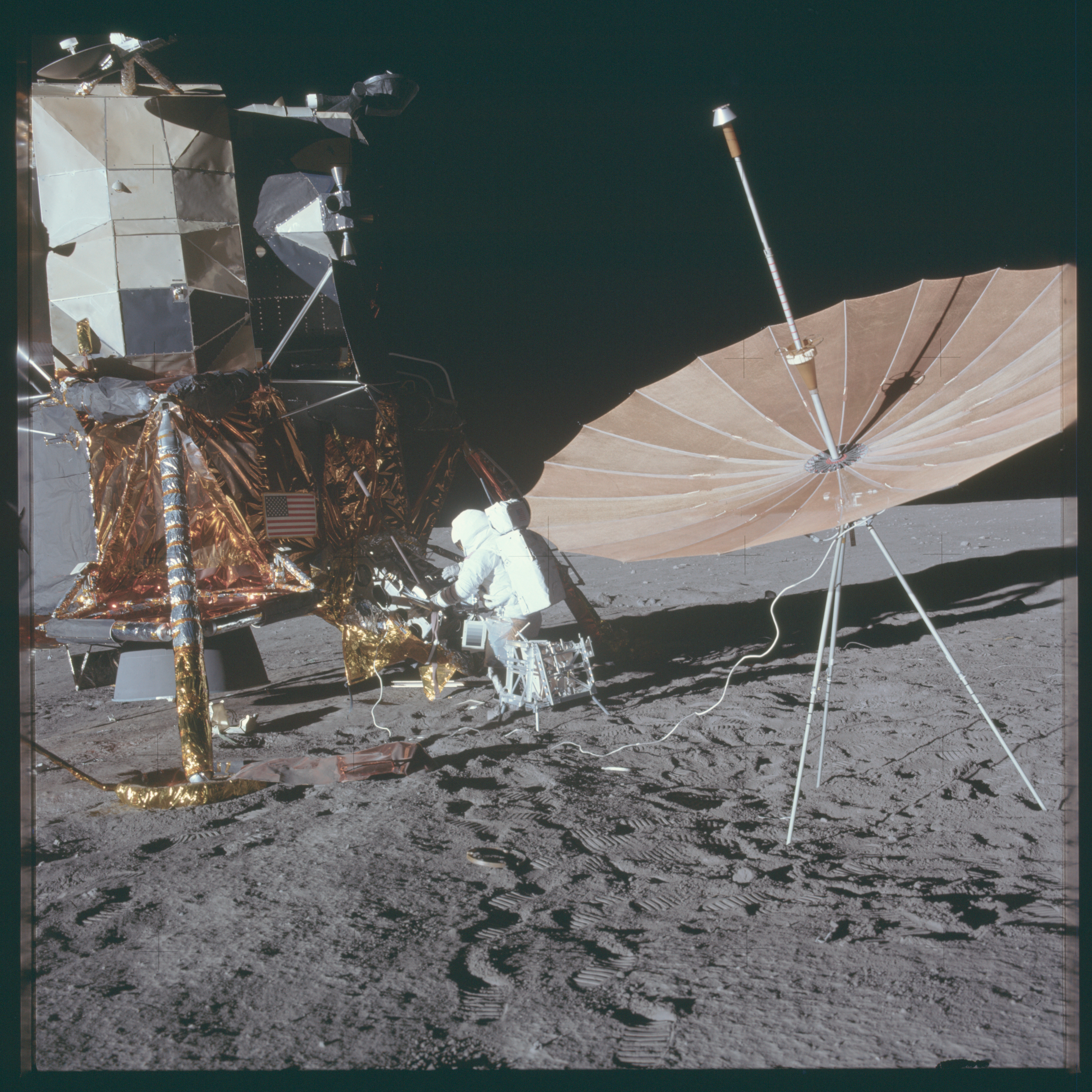
Apollo 12 Erectable S-Band Antenna

Many NASA spacecraft (near Earth and interplanetary) can communicate in the S-band, often using the Deep Space Network. For example, the James Webb Space Telescope, launched in 2021, utilizes 2 GHz S-band to enable 40 kbps real time telemetry from near the Sun–Earth L2 point.

== Other uses ==
Microwave ovens operate at 2495 or 2450 MHz in the ISM band IEEE 802.16a. Some digital cordless telephones operate in this band too. 802.16e standards use a part of the frequency range of S band; under WiMAX standards. Most vendors are manufacturing equipment in the range of 3.5 GHz. The exact frequency range allocated for this type of use varies between countries.

In North America, 2.4–2.483 GHz is an ISM band used for unlicensed spectrum devices such as cordless phones, wireless headphones, and video senders, among other consumer electronics uses, including Bluetooth which operates between 2.402 GHz and 2.480 GHz.

Amateur radio and amateur satellite operators have two S-band allocations, 13 cm (2.4 GHz) and 9 cm (3.4 GHz). Amateur television repeaters also operate in these bands.

Airport surveillance radars typically operate in the 2700–2900 MHz range.

Particle accelerators may be powered by S-band RF sources. The frequencies are then standardized at 2.998 GHz corresponding to a wavelength of 100 mm (Europe) or 2.856 GHz (US).

The National NEXRAD Radar network operates with S-band frequencies. Before implementation of this system, C-band frequencies were commonly used for weather surveillance.

In the United States, the 3.55 to 3.7 GHz band is becoming shared spectrum under rules adopted by the Federal Communications Commission in April 2015 as a result of the National Broadband Plan (United States). The biggest user of CBRS (Citizens Broadband Radio Service) spectrum is the United States Navy. Cable companies are planning to use the band for wireless broadband in rural areas, with Charter Communications beginning tests of the service in January 2018.

The band is also used as a transmit intermediate frequency in satellite communications as a replacement for L band where a single/shared coaxial connection is used between the modem/IDU and antenna/ODU for both the transmit and receive signals. This is to prevent interference between the transmit and receive signals which would otherwise not occur on a dual coaxial setup where the transmit and receive signals are separate and both can use the whole L-band frequency range. In a single coaxial connection using S-Band to "frequency shift" the transmit signal away from L band, a multiplier such as 10, is usually applied to form the SHF frequency. For example, the modem would transmit at 2.815 GHz IF (S Band) to the ODU and then the ODU up-converts this signal to 28.15 GHz SHF (Ka Band) towards the satellite.

== See also ==
- Electromagnetic interference at 2.4 GHz
- ISM band
- Unified S-band, an S-band communication system used in the Apollo program of crewed spaceflight
