= Tiantong (satellite) =

Chinese mobile communications satellite system

Tiantong (Chinese: 天通) is China's first mobile communications satellite system. The first satellite Tiantong-1-01 was launched on 6 August 2016.

== Background ==
The plan to develop mobile communication satellite system in China has been proposed for more than 30 years. In the early 1990s, the scientists in China put forward that the development of satellite mobile communication was an inevitable requirement for a large country with a vast territory, uneven population distribution and frequent natural disasters. When the Wenchuan earthquake occurred, all terrestrial communication systems were down, relying only on the leased foreign satellite telephone link to maintain communication with the outside world. After the Wenchuan earthquake, the state proposed to build its own mobile communication satellite. Its first task is to ensure that when China suffered from severe natural disasters they could use emergency communications, to fill the gaps in the national military and civilian autonomous satellite mobile communications services.

In July 2008, Sun Jiadong and Shen Rongjun (沈荣骏) jointly called for the acceleration of China's independent satellite mobile communication system. After more than three years of demonstration and design by several departments and units in the country, in September 2011, China's first satellite mobile communication system Tiantong-1 satellite mobile communication system project was officially launched.

== System Composition ==
Tiantong-1 satellite mobile communication system is China's self-developed and built satellite mobile communication system, but also an important part of China's space information infrastructure. The system consists of space segment, ground segment and user terminal. The space segment plans to consist of several geosynchronous orbit mobile communication satellites.

== Function ==
According to China Aerospace Science and Technology Corp., the task of the satellite system is to provide all-weather, all-time, stable and reliable mobile communication services to users in China and its surrounding areas, the Middle East, Africa and most parts of the Pacific and Indian oceans.

China Telecom has used this satellite network system to provide satellite telephone operation services in China. The Huawei Mate60 series smartphones, released on 29 August 2023, have a built-in satellite phone function based on this satellite network.

== Tiantong-1 Satellite List ==
Satellite	Launch Date (UTC+8)	COSPAR ID	Launch site	Rocket	Orbit	Status
Tiantong-1 01	6 August 2016, 00:22	2016-048A	Xichang	Long March 3B	GTO	Operational
Tiantong-1 02	12 November 2020, 23:59	2020-082A	Xichang	Long March 3B	GTO	Operational
Tiantong-1 03	20 January 2021, 00:25	2021-003A	Xichang	Long March 3B	GTO	Operational
Tiantong-1 04	2024		Xichang	Long March 3B	GTO	Planned

== See also ==
- BeiDou
