= Thuraya =

UAE-based satellite telecommunications company

Thuraya Telecommunications Company
- Company type: Subsidiary
- Industry: Mobile-satellite services
- Founded: 1997; 29 years ago
- Headquarters: United Arab Emirates
- Owners: Al Yah Satellite Communications
- Website: www.thuraya.com

Thuraya (Arabic: الثريا, Gulf Arabic pron.: [ɐθ.θʊˈrɑj.jɐ]; from the Arabic name for the Pleiades, Thurayya) is a United Arab Emirates-based regional mobile-satellite service (MSS) provider. The company operates two geosynchronous satellites and provides telecommunications coverage in about 150 countries in Europe, the Middle East, North, Central and East Africa and Asia. Thuraya's L-band network delivers voice and data services.

Thuraya is the mobile satellite services subsidiary of Yahsat, a global satellite operator based in the United Arab Emirates, fully owned by Mubadala Investment Company. The geostationary nature of the service implies high round-trip times from satellite to Earth, leading to a noticeable lag being present during voice calls.

== Services ==
- Voice communications with satellite phones or fixed terminals
- Short message service
- 60 kbit/s downlink and 15 kbit/s uplink GMPRS mobile data service on Thuraya satellite phones
- 444 kbit/s high-speed data transfer via a notebook-sized terminal (ThurayaIP)
- A number of other services, such as call waiting, missed calls, voicemail, etc.
- A one-way "high-power alert" capability that notifies users of an incoming call, when the signal path to the satellite is obstructed

== Technical details of the network ==
=== Virtual country code ===
Thuraya's country calling code is +882 16, which is part of the ITU-T International Networks numbering group. Thuraya is not part of the +881 country calling code numbering group, as this is allocated by ITU-T for networks in the Global Mobile Satellite System, of which Thuraya is not a part, being a regional rather than a global system.

=== Air interface ===
Transceivers communicate directly with the satellites using an antenna of roughly the same length as the handset and have a maximum output power of 2 watts. QPSK modulation is used for the air interface. Thuraya SIM cards work in regular GSM telephones, and ordinary GSM SIM cards can be used on the satellite network as long as the SIM provider has a roaming agreement with Thuraya. As with all geosynchronous voice services, a noticeable lag is present while making a call.

Due to the relatively high gain of the antennas contained within handsets, it is necessary to roughly aim the antenna at the satellite. As the handsets contain a GPS receiver, it is possible to program the ground position of the satellites as waypoints to assist with aiming. The service operates on L-band carriers assigned in blocks to areas of coverage referred to as "spotbeams", which are Thuraya's equivalent to cells or service areas. In L-band, 34 MHz of bandwidth from 1.525 GHz to 1.559 GHz is assigned for downlink (space-to-Earth) communication, while the uplink (Earth-to-space) operates between 1.6265 GHz and 1.6605 GHz. Uplink and downlink channels are 1087 paired carrier frequencies, on a raster of 31.25 kHz. A time-division multiple access (TDMA) time-slot architecture is employed which allocates a carrier in time slots of a fixed length.

=== Use of GPS ===
Every Thuraya phone and standalone transceiver unit is fitted with a GPS receiver and transmits its location to the Thuraya gateway periodically. The built-in GPS capability can be used for waypoint navigation.

=== Satellites ===
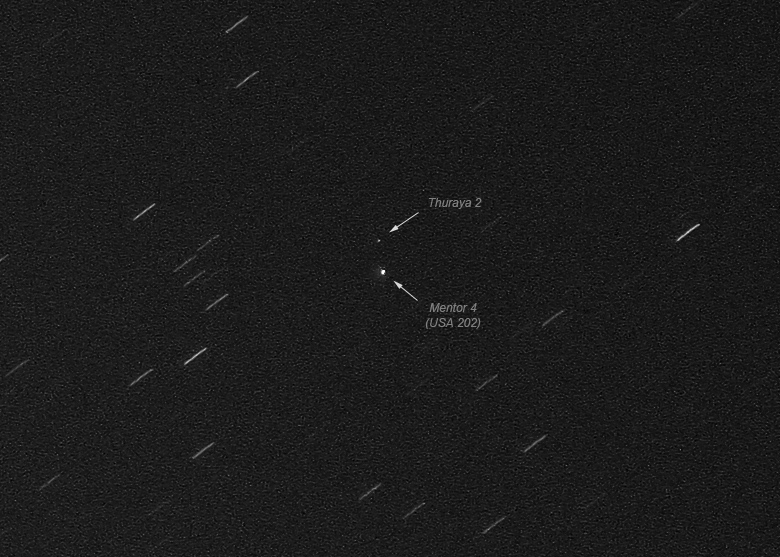
Thuraya 2 and a nearby geostationary satellite, photographed on 8 December 2010 from the Netherlands

Thuraya operates two communications satellites built by Boeing or Airbus Defence and Space.

==== Thuraya 1 ====
The first satellite, named Thuraya 1, had deficient solar panels and could not operate properly; this satellite was positioned above Korea for testing purposes. It was launched on 21 October 2000 by Sea Launch on a Zenit 3SL rocket. At launch it weighed 5250 kg. The satellite was used for testing and backup until May 2007, when it was moved to junk orbit and declared at its end of life.

==== Thuraya 2 ====
Thuraya 2 was launched by Sea Launch on 10 June 2003. It is located in geosynchronous orbit at 44° E longitude with 6.3° inclination. The satellite can handle 13,750 simultaneous voice calls. This satellite currently serves most of Europe, the Middle East, Africa and parts of Asia. The craft had a weight of 3200 kg and an expected life of 12 years. The two solar-panel wings, each containing five panels, generate 11 kW electric power. The craft has two antenna systems: a round C-band antenna, 1.27 meters in diameter and a 12 × 16 meter AstroMesh reflector, 128 element L-band antenna, supplied by Astro Aerospace in Carpinteria, California. These antennas support up to 351 separate spot beams, each configurable to concentrate power where usage needs it. Amateur astronomer observations suspected that the nearby MENTOR 4 USA-202, a satellite belonging to the US National Reconnaissance Office, was eavesdropping on Thuraya 2, and this was reported to be confirmed by documents released on 9 September 2016 by The Intercept as part of the Snowden files.

==== Thuraya 3 ====
The third satellite was planned for launch by Sea Launch in 2007, and the start of Far East and Australia service was planned for 15 October 2007. The failure in January 2007 of the NSS-8 mission on another Sea Launch rocket led to a substantial delay in the launch of Thuraya-3, which was rescheduled for 14 November 2007, but the launch was postponed several times due to sea conditions. The launch vessels set out from port again on 2 January 2008, and launch occurred successfully at 11:49 GMT on 15 January 2008. The Thuraya 3 satellite is technically the same as Thuraya 2, but located in geosynchronous orbit at 98.5° E longitude with 6.2° inclination.

On 15 April 2024, Thuraya 3 suffered an "unexpected payload anomaly" and despite attempted recovery efforts, coverage provided by this satellite was unable to be restored. Thuraya advised that they have suffered a sustained force majeure event and withdrew offering services to regions affected (such as Australia, New Caledonia, Papua New Guinea, Papua, East Timor, and Indonesia).

==== Thuraya 4-NGS ====
Thuraya 4-NGS (Next Generation Satellite) is a satellite launched on a SpaceX Falcon 9 rocket on 3 January 2025. It will replace Thuraya 2. This process will span several months until Thuraya 4 reaches its operational geostationary orbit at 44° East, approximately 36,000 kilometers above Earth.

== Subscriber hardware ==
=== Handsets ===
- Ascom 21 – First-generation handset, monochrome display, 9600 bit/s dial-up data, GSM900-compatible
- Hughes 7100 – First-generation handset, monochrome display, 9600 bit/s dial-up data, GSM900-compatible
- Hughes 7101 – Functionally identical to Hughes 7100 but with added Wireless Application Protocol support
- Thuraya SO-2510 – Second-generation handset, supports GmPRS (60/15 kbit/s), runs VxWorks
- Thuraya SG-2520 – Second-generation handset, supports GmPRS (60/15 kbit/s), runs Windows CE, GSM900/1800-compatible
- Thuraya XT – Third-generation handset, supports GmPRS
- Thuraya XT-DUAL – Third-generation handset, supports GmPRS, GSM900/1800/1900
- Thuraya XT-PRO – Third-generation handset, supports GmPRS
- Thuraya XT-LITE – Third-generation handset, no packet data support, although emails may be sent if configured instead of SMS.
- Thuraya XT-PRO Dual – Third-generation handset, supports GmPRS, GSM, UMTS 2100
- Thuraya X5-Touch – World’s first Android satellite phone
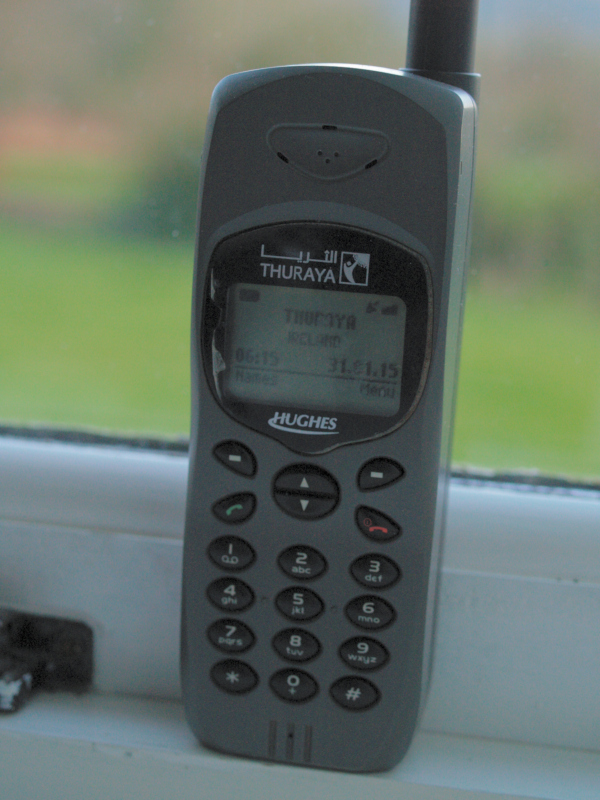
Hughes 7101

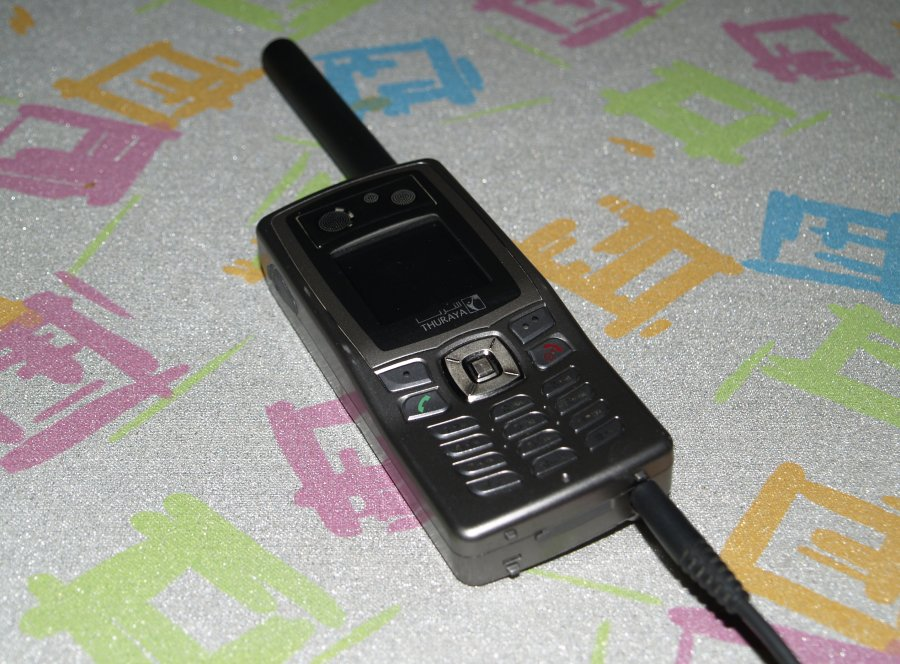
Thuraya SO-2510

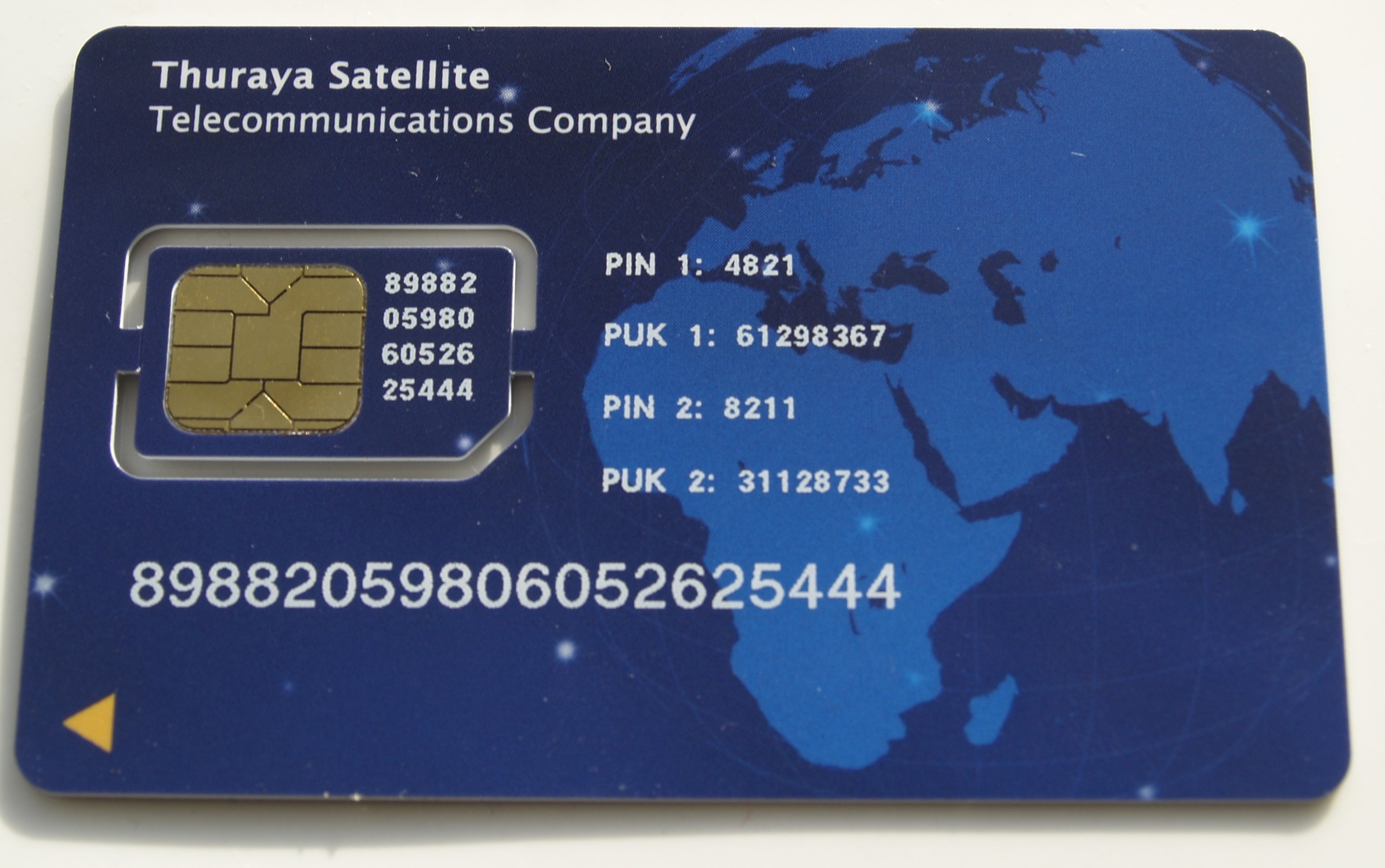
Thuraya SIM

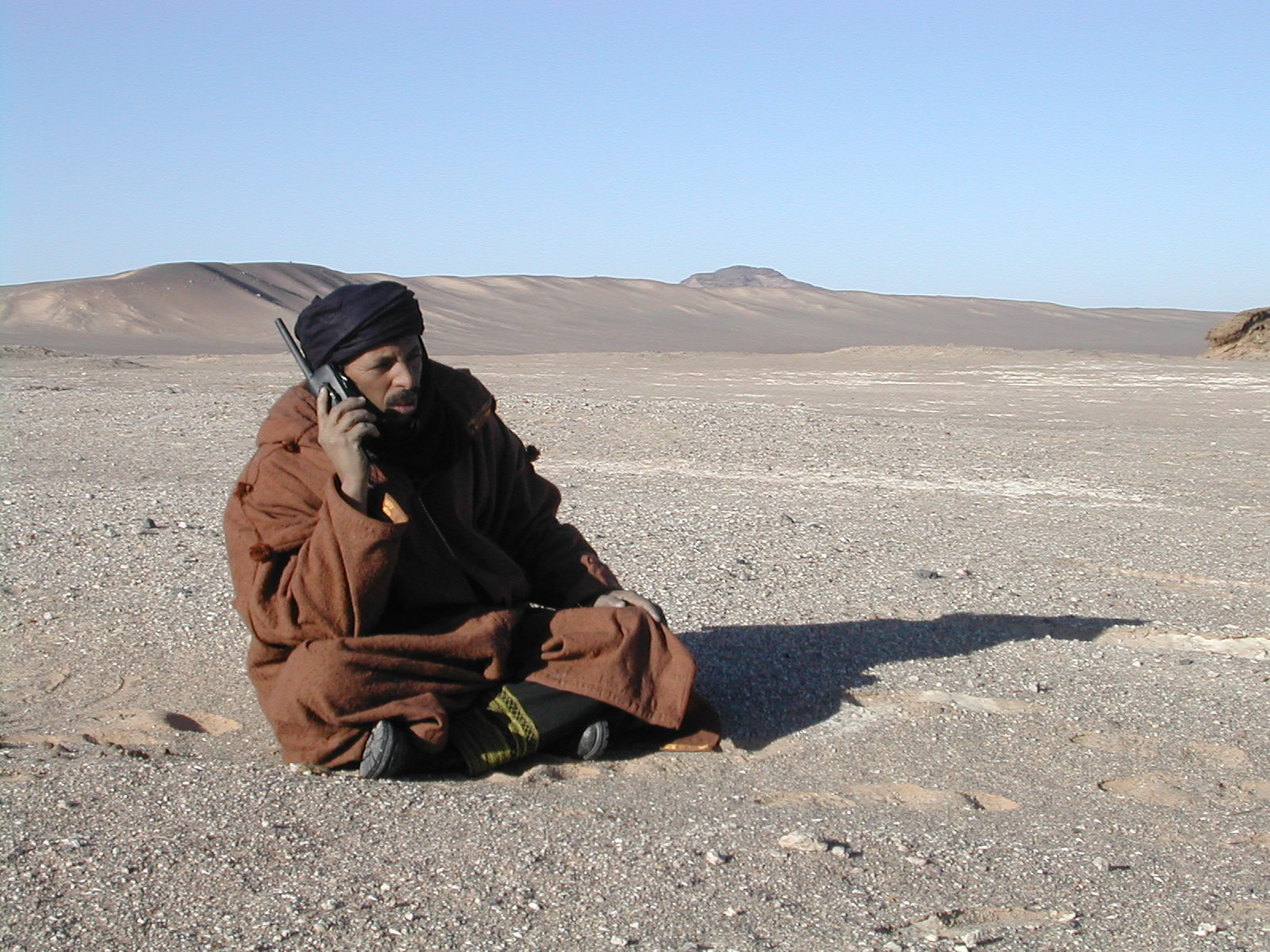
Thuraya phone in use

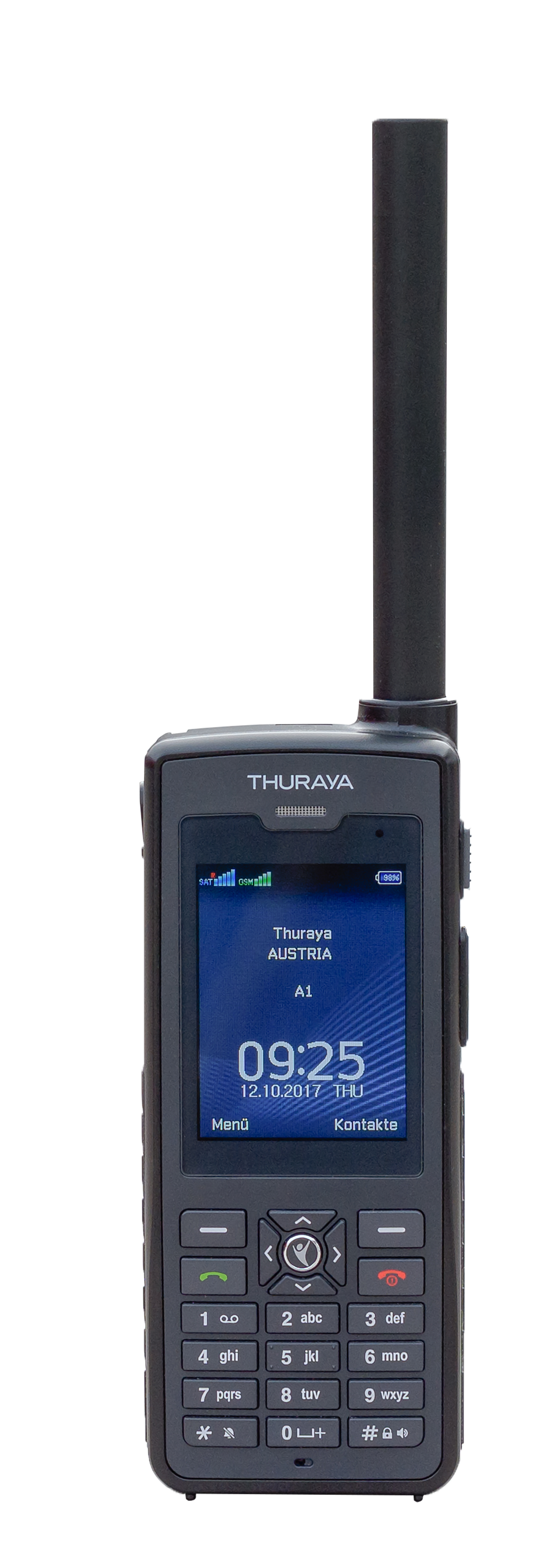
Thuraya XT-PRO DUAL registered simultaneously on the Thuraya network and the A1 GSM network in Austria

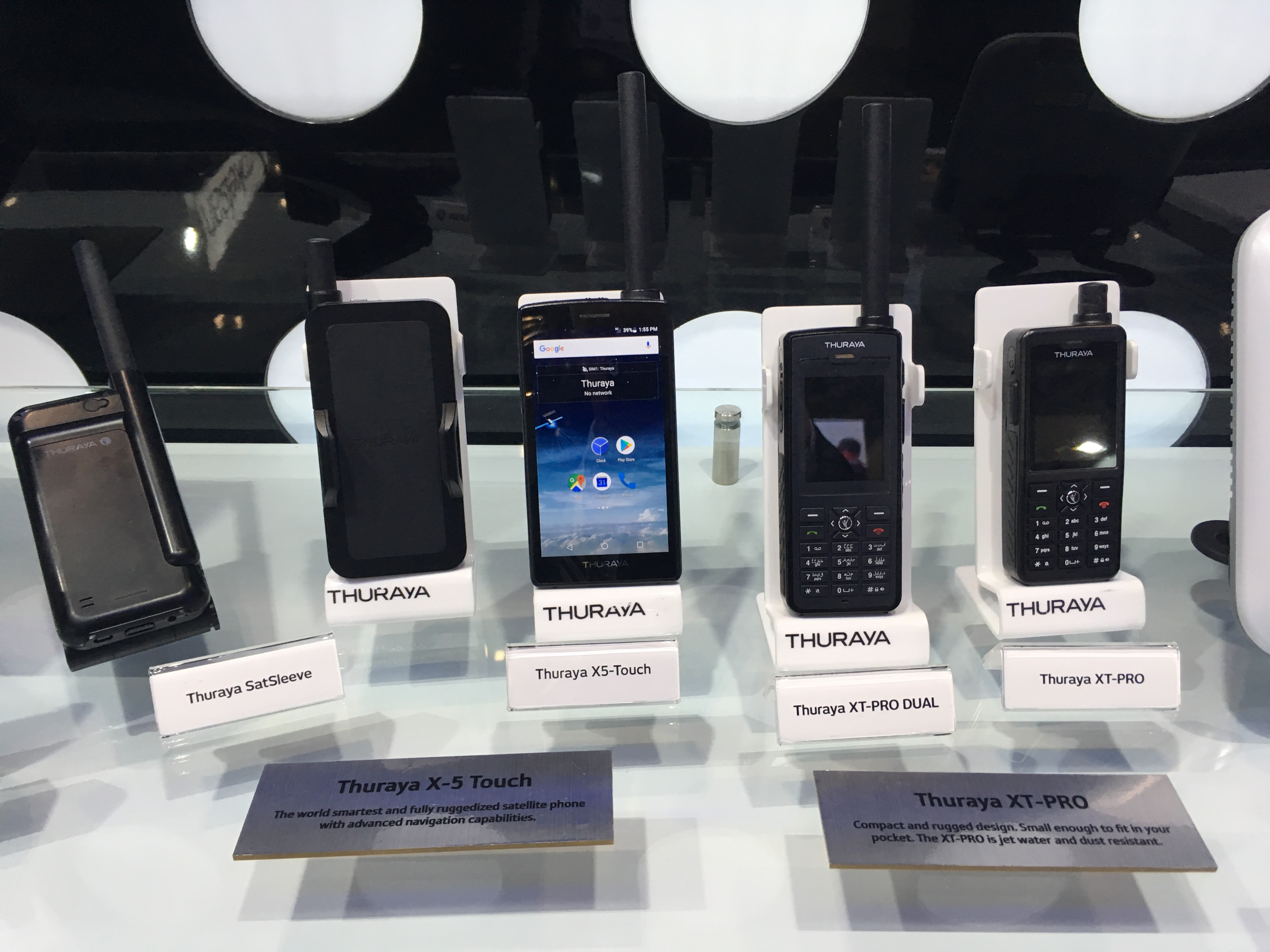
Thuraya Handsets on DSEI-2019, ExCel London

=== Sleeves ===
- SatSleeve for Android
- SatSleeve for iPhone
- SatSleeve Plus
- SatSleeve Hotspot
