= TerreStar Corporation =

TerreStar Corporation (TSTR), formerly Motient Corp. (MNCP - 2000–2007) and American Mobile Satellite Corp. (AMSC - 1988–2000), was the controlling shareholder of TerreStar Networks Inc., TerreStar National Services, Inc. and TerreStar Global Ltd., and a shareholder of SkyTerra Communications.

TerreStar Networks was a Reston, Virginia-based company that operated integrated satellite and terrestrial telecommunications systems. The company declared bankruptcy in 2010 and is now owned by Dish Network.

XM Satellite Radio was a spin-off of American Mobile Satellite Corp.

== TerreStar-1 ==
Arianespace launched TerreStar-1 on the morning of July 1, 2009. With a launch mass of 6,910 kg, it has been deemed "the largest commercial telecommunications satellite ever launched." It was built by Space Systems/Loral and was launched from the Guiana Space Center with an Ariane 5 rocket in French Guiana. TerreStar-1 with the plan of providing mobile voice, messaging and data communications services to North America.

Terrestar system is based on GMR standard.

== Terrestrial network ==
On January 14, 2010, TerreStar announced that the Federal Communications Commission had approved the company's deployment of a terrestrial wireless network using the same S-band frequencies used by TerreStar-1.

== Bankruptcy Restructuring with EchoStar ==
In October 2010, TerreStar filed for a "prepackaged" bankruptcy, led by its largest secured creditor, EchoStar. Together the secured creditors exchanged $940 million of debt for about 97 percent of the company. The plan, along with $75 million of debtor-in-possession financing, was approved in November 2010. In December 2010, an NPO called "A Human Right" mounted an effort to buy the satellite for use over Africa, with basic free internet service for those who don't have it, and internet access for nations that have cut off international internet connections. On February 16, 2011, TerreStar Corporation filed for Chapter 11 bankruptcy protection.

After successfully bidding $1.375 billion for the acquisition of the TerreStar-1 satellite in a bankruptcy-court auction, Dish Network on August 22, 2011, asked the Federal Communications Commission to let the company utilize the wireless spectrum of TerreStar to offer its own wireless broadband service.

== See also ==
- Mobile-satellite service
- Satellite phone
- TerreStar Networks
- Gonets
- ICO Global Communications
- O3b Networks
- EchoStar Mobile
- SkyTerra
