= Pendrell Corporation =

American company

Pendrell Corporation (formerly NASDAQ:PCO, delisted Nov 2017) is an intellectual property (IP) investment, advisory services and asset management firm. The company develops and implements strategies to acquire, commercialize, manage, divest and license IP. The company, formerly ICO Global Communications, is based in Kirkland, Washington.

In June, 2011, Pendrell acquired the Ovidian Group, an intellectual property strategic advisory services firm. In October, 2011, Pendrell acquired ContentGuard, a leading developer of digital rights management technologies with more than 260 patents. More than 50 percent of the world's handset manufacturers have licensing agreements in place with ContentGuard.

== Corporate history ==
Founded in January 1995, ICO Global Communications, planned to build a mobile-satellite service (MSS) constellation in medium Earth orbit (in two 45°-inclined orthogonal planes), and had contracted Boeing Satellite Development Center (then Hughes) for 12 spacecraft in July of that year — ten operational spacecraft and two in-orbit spares. ICO filed for Chapter 11 bankruptcy protection in August 1999, but emerged as New ICO in May 2000, following investments by Craig McCaw and others. ICO has pursued plans to build and launch a geosynchronous satellite to cover North America, supplemented by an ancillary terrestrial component. ICO G1 launched on April 14, 2008, and ICO's application for an ancillary terrestrial component was approved by the Federal Communications Commission in January 2009.

In June 2011 ICO Global Communications was renamed to Pendrell Corporation (Nasdaq: PCO).

== Early satellites ==
The first spacecraft, a Hughes HS 601 designated ICO F-1, was lost due to a Sea Launch anomaly on March 12, 2000. In September 2000, ICO contracted Hughes for three additional spacecraft, and Hughes agreed to modify the 11 remaining spacecraft from the original contract to support an ICO re-design of the system. Hughes Space Systems subsequently became a subsidiary of the Boeing Corporation. On June 19, 2001, the second spacecraft, ICO F2, was successfully launched by an Atlas II AS from Cape Canaveral Air Force Station. The remaining spacecraft are in storage in various stages of near completion, and litigation between ICO and Boeing involving the ICO MEO satellites went to trial in June, 2008. In October, 2008, a jury awarded ICO $371 million in damages and $236 million in punitive damages in verdicts which found Boeing guilty of fraud, tortious interference and breach of contract. The Los Angeles County Superior Court finalized the verdict in March, 2009 in an amount totaling $603 million.

== G1 satellite ==
The ICO G1 satellite was built by Space Systems/Loral, based on the Loral 1300 platform. A contract to launch the satellite was signed with Lockheed Martin, who announced plans to launch the satellite on an Atlas V launch vehicle, flying in the 421 configuration. Launch, from Space Launch Complex 41 at the Cape Canaveral Air Force Station occurred at 20:12:00 GMT on April 4, 2008. The satellite separated from the carrier rocket 30 minutes and 49 seconds later, completing a successful launch. It is currently in a nominal geosynchronous orbit. At the time, ICO G1 was the largest commercial satellite ever launched. A larger satellite based on the same Loral 1300 platform, TerreStar-1, was successfully launched on July 1, 2009.

=== G1 ===
The G1 satellite is intended to support a wide range of mobile voice, video and data services, and covers the continental United States, Alaska, Hawaii, Puerto Rico and the US Virgin Islands. Alpha trials of this service began in 2008 in Las Vegas, Nevada and Raleigh-Durham, North Carolina.

== See also ==
- Mobile-satellite service
- Satellite phone
- O3b Networks
- OnStar
- Sirius Satellite Radio
- EchoStar Mobile
- SkyTerra
- Teledesic
- TerreStar
- XM Satellite Radio
