= SkyWave Mobile Communications =

Satellite communications company

- Type: Subsidiary
- Industry: Satellite Communications; M2M
- Founded: Ottawa, Ontario, Canada (1997)
- Headquarters: Ottawa, Canada
- Area served: Worldwide
- Products: Satellite tracking and monitoring terminals
- Services: Satellite network services
- Number of employees: 180 (2013)
- Parent: ORBCOMM
- Website: www.skywave.com

SkyWave Mobile Communications is a global provider of satellite and satellite-cellular devices in the Machine-to-Machine (M2M) market. Skywave products help customers track, monitor and control industrial vehicles, vessels and industrial equipment. Applications include: tracking the location of vehicle fleets, monitoring data from oil and gas meters, and automated flow pumps.

SkyWave's satellite products communicate via Inmarsat's global satellite service. The products are mainly used in the transportation, maritime, mining, oil and gas, heavy equipment, emergency management, water monitoring, and utilities sectors.

== History ==
SkyWave Mobile Communications was founded in Ottawa, Ontario, Canada in 1997. In its initial stages SkyWave relied on the research and technical expertise provided by the Communications Research Centre Canada (CRC) and local government funding services to develop the first product.

Some examples of SkyWave products in use include theft-prevention security measures in U.S. government ships and trucks, satellite services to U.S. government agencies, tuna buoys in the Pacific, truck tracking in the jungles of Brazil, the oil & gas industry in North America, and drinking water control in the UK. In addition, SkyWave's satellite terminals have been used to track races such as Rhino Charge 2011, the Dubai-Muscat Offshore Sailing Race in 2008, and the China Sea Race from Hong Kong to Subic Bay in 2006.

On April 1, 2009, Inmarsat acquired a 19% stake in SkyWave Mobile Communications to expand presence in the SLDR (Satellite Low Data Rate) market. SkyWave used the funds to acquire GlobalWave and double its size. The SLDR market is estimated at $600m and is expected to grow.

In December 2009, SkyWave launched a GLONASS-compatible product for the Russian market. The DMR-800L with GLONASS/GPS can use either or both of the navigation systems to determine location.

In August 2011, SkyWave launched IsatData Pro, a low data rate service for managing and communicating with remote assets around the world. The IsatData Pro delivers up to 10,000 bytes to the device and up to 6,400 bytes from the device. Applications include vehicle telemetry information, text-messaging remote workers, maintaining up-to-date driver logs, and the remote management and control of fixed assets.

In 2012, SkyWave introduced IP SCADA service to work with its IDP series terminals for remote sites. IP SCADA allows IP-based point-to-point satellite communication connections between small remote sites and SCADA systems where other communications are unavailable, unreliable, or expensive.

In early January 2015, ORBCOMM completed its acquisition of SkyWave.

Today, SkyWave is located in Ottawa's technology district, west of the town of Kanata, Ontario and employs over 180 people. SkyWave has designed, manufactured and shipped more than 600,000 satellite terminals to customers in the transportation, maritime, oil and gas, heavy equipment, utilities and government sectors worldwide.

== Markets ==
SkyWave sells terminals to Solution Providers who put satellite communications products and services into industry-specific applications for their customers. The following are some of the main uses for this technology:

Transportation Applications:

- Vehicle tracking and monitoring, fleet management
- Security and anti-theft monitoring
- Heavy equipment security and management
- Trailer and container tracking, rail car tracking
- Cold Chain Management

Mining Applications:

- Heavy equipment and machine tracking
- Remote installation sensor monitoring
- Water management

Maritime applications:

- Long Range Identification and Tracking (LRIT)
- Ship Security Alerting System (SSAS)
- Vessel monitoring system (VMS)
- Vessel equipment, environment, security monitoring
- Commercial fishing boat and leisure marine tracking
- Merchant marine monitoring
- Buoy sensor monitoring and tracking

Oil & Gas Applications:

- Oil & gas pipeline and critical parameters monitoring and control
- Cathodic protection
- SCADA equipment monitoring and management
- Fluids monitoring
- Electric power valves monitoring and control
- Environmental monitoring

Defence and Security Applications:

- Personnel tracking
- Perimeter control
- Homeland and border security
- Blue Force Tracking, protection, monitoring, and security

Utilities Applications:

- Water quality and quantity monitoring
- Water regulation and control
- Real-time analysis and monitoring
- Emergency response alerts
- Metering

Emergency Management

- Fleet tracking
- Siren warning system

== Products ==
The following are the satellite terminals manufactured by SkyWave Mobile Communications:

IsatData Pro

IDP 800 Series- The IDP 800 is a low profile terminal ideal for tracking trailers, containers, vehicles and vessels. It can be powered by non-rechargeable batteries, rechargeable batteries, or vehicle power.

IDP 700 Series- The IDP-780 terminal is equipped with both IsatData Pro satellite and cellular modems so it can use the lowest cost communication network depending on availability and quality of service.

IDP600 Series- The IDP 600 Series terminals use the two-way Inmarsat IsatData Pro satellite service for remotely managing fixed and mobile assets anywhere in the world. Models include one for low-elevation and maritime applications as well as applications that require Class 1 Division 2 certification.

IDP100 Series- The IDP 100 Series modems are designed to be integrated into larger systems and use the two-way Inmarsat IsatData Pro satellite service.

IsatM2M

SureLinx 8100/8100c- A dual-mode satellite/GPRS transceiver that switches between cellular (GPRS) frequencies and IsatM2M satellite service when cellular service is not available. The SureLinx 8100c has an on-board computer designed specifically for vehicle telemetry applications.

DMR-800D- A satellite-only transceiver with two-way communication capabilities and low-power mode that allows use in remote unmanned locations.

DMR-800L- This transceiver is designed with a low look angle to be used in harsh conditions and marine environments.

DMR-800 OEM- A DMR-800 transceiver that comes unpackaged, allowing for customization and addition of sensors according to application needs.

DMR-800D C1D2- A Class 1 Division 2 certified satellite transceiver that allows monitoring of assets, processes and environments in hazardous locations. The product includes a RS-485 serial interface for connection to SCADA devices, Modbus protocol interfaces for implementing reporting and telemetry capabilities of remote equipment and discrete input/output feeds for monitoring and control of local devices not using Modbus.

DMR-800LRIT- The DMR-800LRIT is designed specifically for the strict LRIT standards set by the International Maritime Organization (IMO).

== See also ==
- ASTRA2Connect Maritime Broadband
- Gonets
