= Satellite phone =

Type of mobile phone

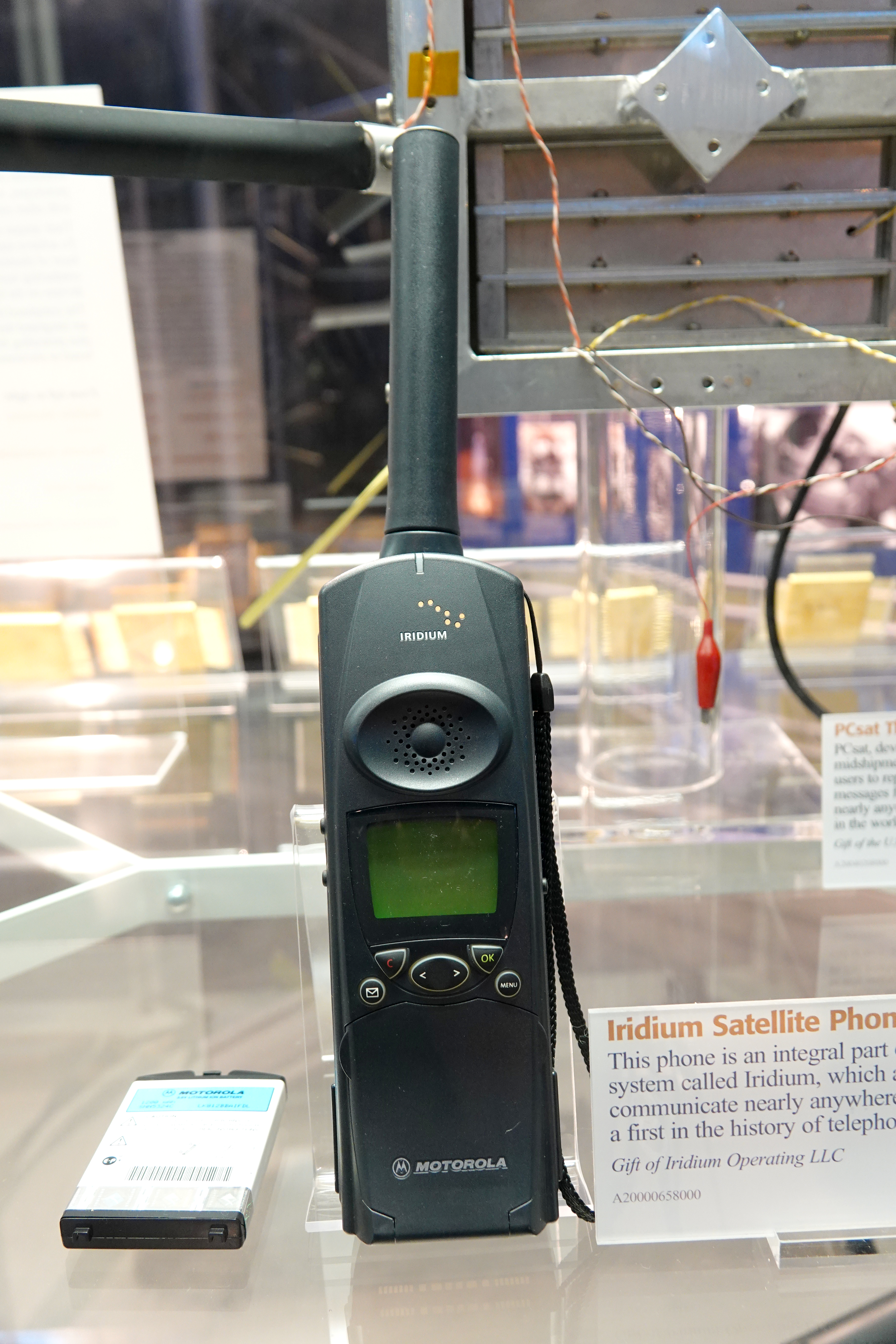
An Iridium satellite phone, late 1990s

A satellite phone (also called a satellite telephone or satphone) is a type of mobile phone that connects to the public switched telephone network through orbiting satellites instead of terrestrial cell sites.

While cellular telephone service companies rely on cell towers, satellite service functions even in areas without terrestrial network coverage but require line-of-sight to a satellite. Most support voice, text, and low-bandwidth data services.

== Equipment ==
Early handsets were large and required deployable antennas, while later models are comparable in size to ordinary smartphones.

Fixed ship and vehicle installations use directional microwave antennas that track satellites automatically.

Smaller systems may rely on VoIP over satellite internet links such as BGAN or VSAT.

Indoor reception is limited and may require external antennas or repeaters. More recently, unmodified smartphones with no special support for satellite communication are also able to be used for direct-to-phone satellite telephony.

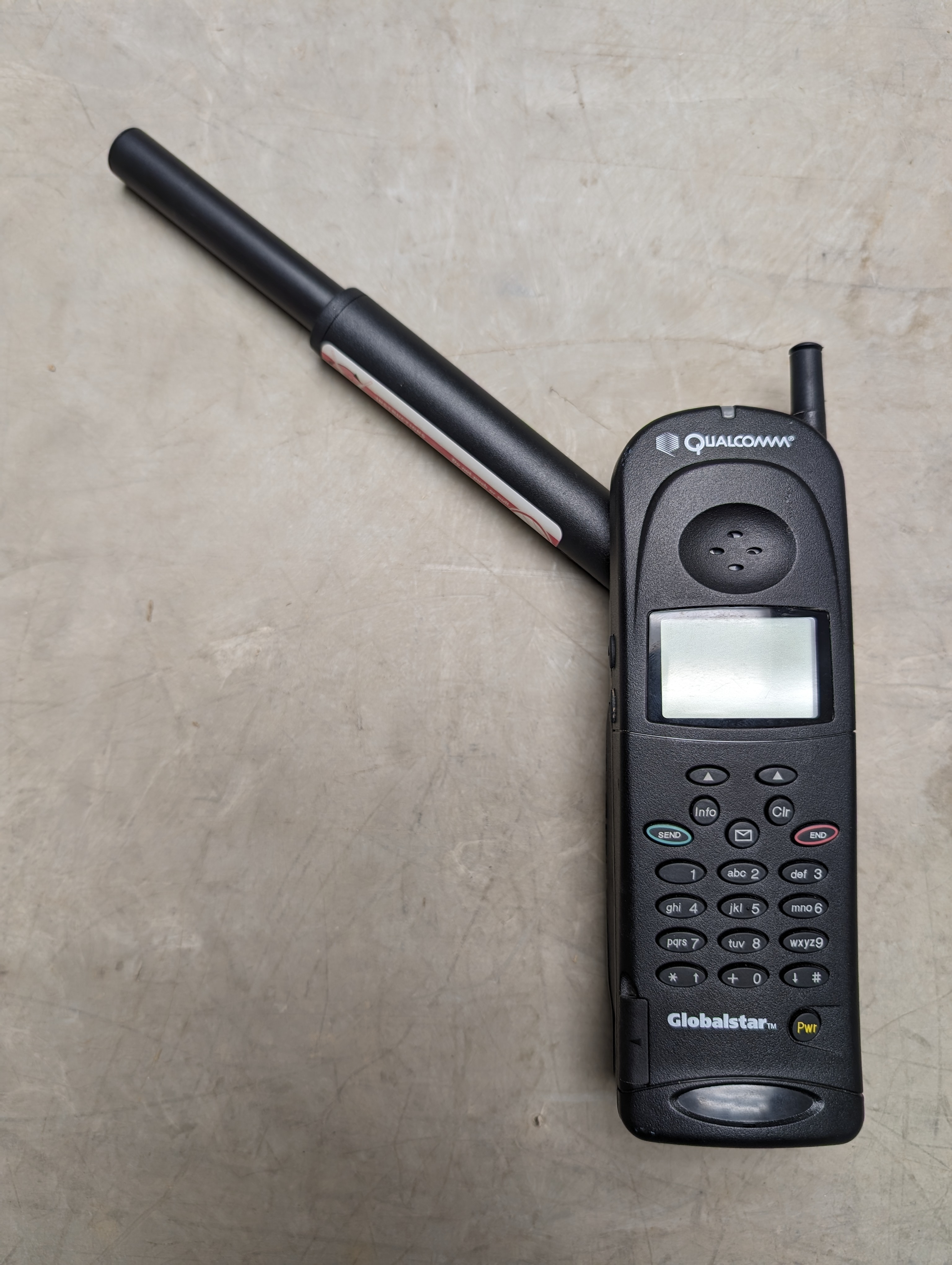
Globalstar GSP-1600 satellite phone, 2024

== History ==
The first voice signals relayed via satellite were transmitted in 1958 using the experimental SCORE satellite, soon after the launch of Sputnik 1.

MARISAT (1976) became the first dedicated mobile communications satellite and was later integrated into the Inmarsat organization, founded in 1979.

== Satellite networks ==
Satellite telephony systems operate mainly through two orbital types: geostationary orbit (GEO), about 35,786 kilometres (22,236 mi) above Earth, and low Earth orbit (LEO), about 640 to 1,120 kilometres (400 to 700 mi). The orbit determines coverage area, latency, and terminal design.

=== Geostationary systems ===
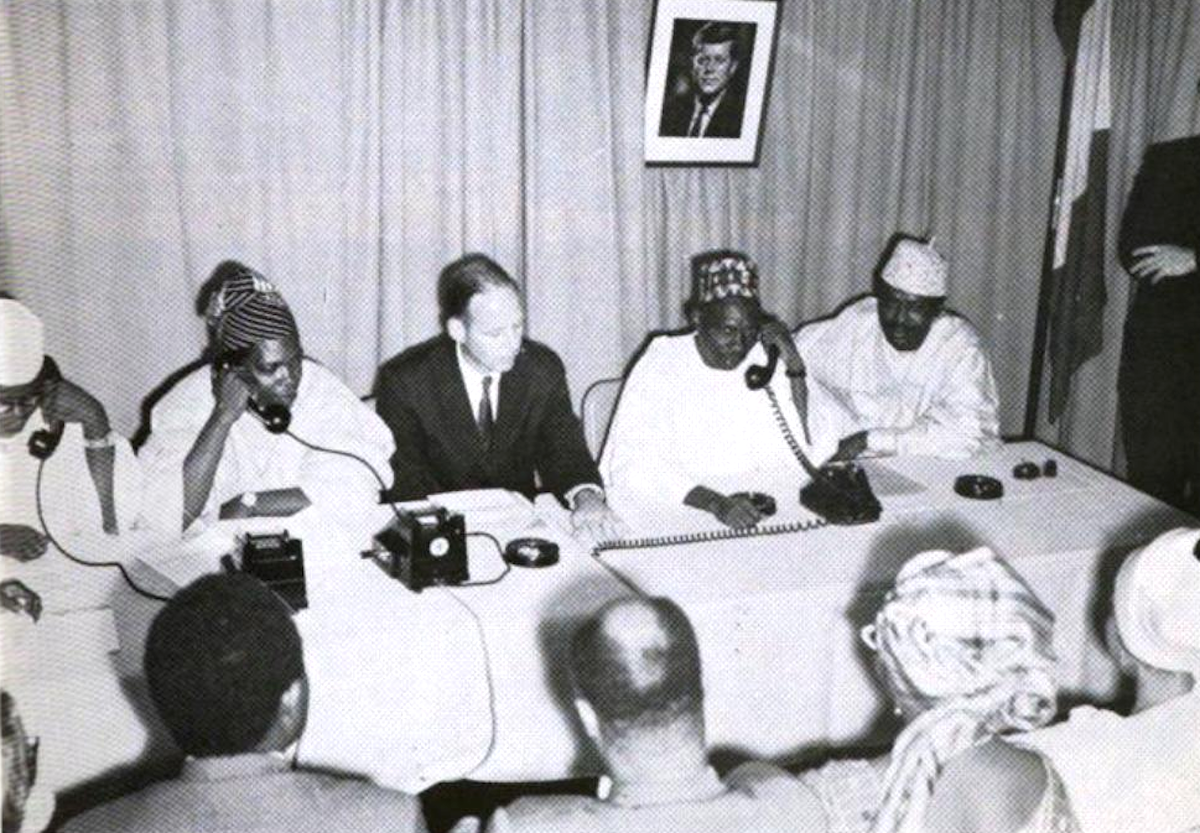
Prime Minister Abubakar Tafawa Balewa speaking with President John F. Kennedy via the SYNCOM satellite, 1963

GEO satellites appear fixed in the sky, allowing near-global coverage with few satellites. The long signal path introduces latency but supports higher data throughput than LEO networks. GEO service is reliable up to roughly 70° latitude; signal quality decreases near the poles or in obstructed terrain.

Notable GEO-based operators include:

- ACeS – Indonesia-based operator active 2000–2014
- Inmarsat – Founded 1979, provides global coverage except polar regions
- Thuraya – UAE-based, operating since 1997 across Europe, Africa, Asia, and Australia
- MSAT / SkyTerra – North American operator offering mobile and fixed terminals
- Terrestar – U.S. operator using geosynchronous orbit
- Tiantong – Chinese GEO system for regional voice and messaging services

=== Low Earth orbit systems ===
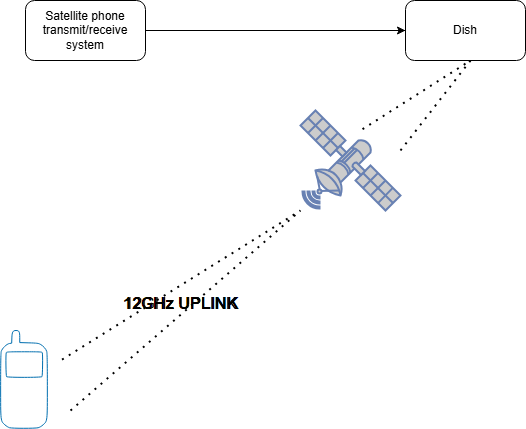
Simplified satellite telephony link diagram

LEO satellites orbit Earth every 70–100 minutes. Continuous service requires constellations of dozens of satellites, as each satellite remains visible for only several minutes.

Major operators:

- Globalstar – 48 active satellites covering most land areas; depends on ground gateways within view of satellites
- Iridium – 66 active near-polar satellites with inter-satellite links providing global coverage

Both systems launched in the late 1990s, experienced bankruptcy, and were later restructured. Typical data speeds range from 2.4 to 9.6 kbit/s.

=== Emerging hybrid networks ===
In 2022, T-Mobile US and SpaceX announced a partnership using second-generation Starlink satellites to provide limited mobile coverage via existing LTE spectrum.

In 2026, Starlink rebranded its Direct to Cell service as Starlink Mobile and partnered with local cellular network operators in multiple countries to offer 4G connection from a limited range of standard cellphones. In the UK VirginMedia O2 offers the service which is compatible with iPhone Pro 13 upwards and certain Samsung Galaxy Models which support DtC (aka – Direct to Device) technology. The service operates via 650 of Starlink’s (approximately 9,800) satellites in Low Earth Orbit (Feb 2026).

AST SpaceMobile is developing a 3GPP-compliant space network linking standard smartphones to satellites in areas lacking terrestrial coverage. In 2024, Iridium announced “Project Stardust”, a planned 5G non-terrestrial service for messaging and IoT devices.

== Numbering ==
Satellite phone networks use special international numbering codes. Inmarsat numbers use +870. Historical codes +871–+874 were phased out in 2008. LEO networks such as Iridium and Globalstar use ranges within +881, while smaller regional systems use +882 for international networks.

== Cost ==
Satellite communication remains significantly more expensive than terrestrial mobile service due to launch and maintenance costs. Used handsets typically cost a few hundred US dollars; new models and broadband terminals several thousand. Service fees often include a monthly base charge and per-minute rates higher than cellular equivalents.

== Legal restrictions ==
Some governments restrict or require licences for satellite-phone use because the devices connect directly to foreign networks. Restrictions apply in countries including China, India, Myanmar, North Korea, and Russia, generally citing national security or spectrum management concerns.

== Security ==
Modern satellite phone systems encrypt voice traffic, but earlier proprietary algorithms (GMR-1, GMR-2) were shown to have cryptographic weaknesses. For sensitive communication, additional encryption or secure satellite services are used.

== Role in disaster response ==
Satellite phones are valuable when terrestrial networks fail during natural disasters or conflicts. They have supported communication following events such as major earthquakes, hurricanes, and power outages. Because each satellite beam serves large regions, capacity remains limited during widespread emergencies.

== Dual connectivity smartphones ==
In the 2020s, some smartphones gained satellite connectivity for emergency use. Thuraya introduced the X5 Touch (2018) combining satellite and cellular communication. Apple added emergency satellite messaging with the iPhone 14 (2022) and roadside assistance in the iPhone 15 (2023). Such services typically support text-based communication and limited emergency data.

=== Notable dual-mode phones ===
- 2018 – Thuraya X5 Touch, first android and gsm satellite phone, external antenna
- 2021 – Thuraya XT Lite, external antenna
- 2022 – Apple iPhone 14, internal antenna, Globalstar
- 2022 – Huawei Mate 50 Series, internal antenna, BeiDou
- 2023 – Motorola Defy 2, internal antenna, Bullitt Satellite, Skylo for satellite messaging
- 2023 – Apple iPhone 15
- 2023 – Huawei P60 Series, internal antenna, Tiantong for calling
- 2023 – Xiaomi 14 Pro Titanium Edition, internal antenna, Tiantong
- 2024 – Pixel 9 and newer for Emergencies via "SOS Satellite"
- 2024 – Thuraya Skyphone, Android smartphone with a massive pull-out/retractable antenna
- 2024 – vivo X100 Ultra, internal antenna
- 2024 – Huawei Pocket 2, first internal antenna flip phone style foldable smartphone
- 2024 – Oppo Find X7 Ultra Satellite Edition, internal antenna

== See also ==
- Broadband Global Area Network
- Mobile-satellite service
- Satellite internet
- Telecommunications
