= Rate of turn =

Rate of turn may refer to:

- Standard rate turn, a reference for aircraft maneuvering
- Rate of turn indicator, the rate a ship is turning

== See also ==
- Rate of return, profit on an investment over a period of time
- Rate (disambiguation)
- Turn (disambiguation)
