= SRMSAT =

Nanosatellite built in India

- Mission type: Technology
- Operator: SRM Institute of Science and Technology
- COSPAR ID: 2011-058D
- SATCAT no.: 37841
- Website: www.teamsrmsat.in
- Mission duration: 12 months (planned); 14 years, 11 months, 13 days (in progress)

Spacecraft properties
- Launch mass: 10 kilograms (22 lb)

Start of mission
- Launch date: 12 October 2011
- Rocket: PSLV C18
- Launch site: Satish Dhawan FLP

Orbital parameters
- Reference system: Geocentric
- Regime: Low Earth
- Inclination: 20 degrees
- Period: 102.1 minutes

SRMSAT is a Nanosatellite built by faculty and students at Sri Ramaswamy Memorial University (SRM Institute of Science and Technology, Chennai) in India. The satellite is an Indian Technology demonstration and Earth observation satellite which is operated by the SRM Institute of Science and Technology. This nanosatellite was used to monitor Greenhouse gases in atmosphere.

SRMSAT's primary mission was the development of a nanosatellite platform for future missions. Its secondary mission was monitoring of greenhouse gasses using an Argus Spectrometer.

== Specifications ==
- It is a 10.4-kilogram (23 lb) spacecraft, which measures 28 centimetres (11 in) in length by 28 centimetres (11 in) in height and width.
- Its development programme cost around 1.5 crore rupee.
- It had a design life of one year, but is still working As of October 2017 and can be tracked easily on n2yo.com

== Launch ==
It was launched from the Indian Space Research Organisation (ISRO)'s Satish Dhawan Space Centre at Sriharikota in October 2011. atop a Polar Satellite Launch Vehicle (PSLV) C18 rocket. The launch was a multi-payload mission shared with Megha-Tropiques, VesselSat-1 and Jugnu.

== Parameters ==
SRMSAT is controlled by a 28.8 MHz Atmel microcontroller. Communication is via Ultra high frequency (UHF), with a downlink at 437.5 MHz providing a data rate of 2.4 kbit/s and an uplink at 145.9 MHz with a 1 kbit/s data rate. Attitude control is via solar cell management system (SCDM), an on-board magnetometer and Global Positioning System (GPS) receiver that provide data for magnetorquer coils which interact with the Earth's magnetosphere to change the satellite's orientation.

== See also ==
- 2011 in spaceflight
