= VesselSat-1 =

- Mission type: Communications; AIS tracking
- Operator: LuxSpace; Orbcomm (leased)
- COSPAR ID: 2011-058C
- SATCAT no.: 37840
- Mission duration: 3 years planned; 4 years achieved

Spacecraft properties
- Manufacturer: LuxSpace
- Launch mass: 29 kilograms (64 lb)

Start of mission
- Launch date: October 12, 2011, 05:31 UTC
- Rocket: PSLV-CA
- Launch site: Satish Dhawan FLP
- Contractor: ISRO

End of mission
- Last contact: End of 2015

Orbital parameters
- Reference system: Geocentric
- Regime: Sun-synchronous
- Perigee altitude: 853 kilometers (530 mi)
- Apogee altitude: 873 kilometers (542 mi)
- Inclination: 19.96 degrees
- Period: 102.07 minutes
- Epoch: July 4, 2014, 06:26:37 UTC

VesselSat-1 (Orbcomm FM42, V1) was a miniaturized satellite built and owned by LuxSpace, which was operated by Orbcomm under lease. VesselSat-1 and its sister satellite, VesselSat-2 were used by Orbcomm to compensate the functionality of the malfunctioning Orbcomm-QL satellites.

== Launch ==
It was launched from the ISRO's Satish Dhawan Space Centre (SDSC) at Sriharikota in October 2011 atop a PSLV-CA rocket, flight C18. The launch was a multi-payload mission along with Megha-Tropiques, SRMSAT and Jugnu.

== Spacecraft ==
Vesselsat was the first satellite to be built in Luxembourg. It had a mass of 29 kg (64 lb) and had the form of a cube 30 centimeters (0.98 ft) along each side. Its mission was the tracking of shipping by receiving broadcasts from their Automatic Identification System (AIS).

== See also ==
- 2011 in spaceflight
