= Megha-Tropiques =

Indian-French weather satellite

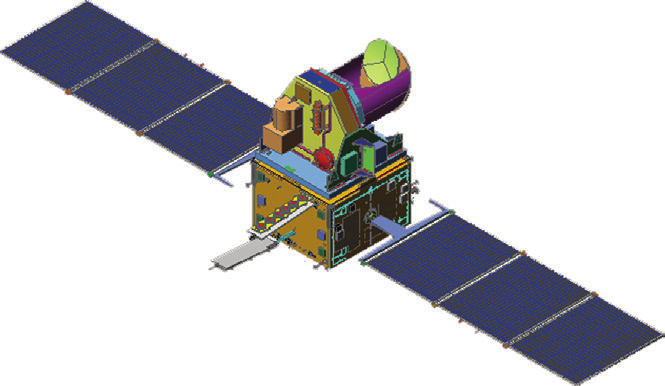
- Mission type: Weather
- Operator: ISRO/CNES
- COSPAR ID: 2011-058A
- SATCAT no.: 37838
- Website: meghatropiques.ipsl.polytechnique.fr/index.php
- Mission duration: Planned: 3 years Final: 10 years, 5 months

Spacecraft properties
- Manufacturer: ISRO
- Launch mass: 1,000 kilograms (2,205 lb)
- Power: 1325 W

Start of mission
- Launch date: 12 October 2011
- Rocket: PSLV-CA C18
- Launch site: Satish Dhawan FLP
- Contractor: ISRO

End of mission
- Disposal: decommissioned
- Deactivated: April 2022
- Decay date: 7 March 2023

Orbital parameters
- Reference system: Geocentric
- Semi-major axis: 7,238.45 kilometres (4,497.76 mi)
- Eccentricity: 0.0009922
- Perigee altitude: 860 kilometres (530 mi)
- Apogee altitude: 874 kilometres (543 mi)
- Inclination: 19.98 degrees
- Period: 102.15 minutes
- Epoch: 25 January 2015, 01:35:41 UTC

Megha-Tropiques was a satellite mission to study the water cycle in the tropical atmosphere in the context of climate change. A collaborative effort between Indian Space Research Organisation (ISRO) and French Centre National d’Etudes Spatiales (CNES), Megha-Tropiques was successfully deployed into orbit by a PSLV rocket in October 2011.

Megha-Tropiques was initially scrapped in 2003, but later revived in 2004 after India increased its contribution and overall costs were lowered. With the progress made by GEWEX (Global Energy and Water Cycle Experiment), Megha-Tropiques was designed to understand tropical meteorological and climatic processes, by obtaining reliable statistics on the water and energy budget of the tropical atmosphere. Megha-Tropiques complemented other data in regional monsoon projects such as MAHASRI and the completed GAME project. Megha-Tropiques also sought to describe the evolution of major tropical weather systems. The focus was the repetitive measurement of the tropics.

== Design ==
Megha-Tropiques instruments allowed simultaneous observation of three interrelated components of the atmospheric engine: water vapor, condensed water (clouds and precipitations), and radiative fluxes, facilitating the repetitive sampling of the inter-tropical zone over long periods of time. Its microwave radiometer, Multi-frequency Microwave Scanning Radiometer (MADRAS), complemented the radiometers of the other elements of the Global Precipitation Measurement mission.

== Payload ==
Instruments fulfill a critical role on Earth observation satellites. On this mission, microwave instruments were essential.

- Microwave Analysis and Detection of Rain and Atmospheric Structures (MADRAS) is a microwave imager, with conical scanning (incidence angle 56°), close from the SSM/I and TMI concepts. The main aim of the mission being the study of cloud systems, a frequency has been added (150 GHz) in order to study the high level ice clouds associated with the convective systems, and to serve as a window channel relative to the sounding instrument at 183 GHz.
- Sounder for Probing Vertical Profiles of Humidity (SAPHIR) is a sounding instrument with six channels near the absorption band of water vapor at 183 GHz. These channels provide relatively narrow weighting functions from the surface to about 10 km (6.2 mi), allowing retrieving water vapor profiles in the cloud free troposphere. The scanning is cross-track, up to an incidence angle of 50°. The resolution at nadir is of 10 km (6.2 mi).
- Scanner for Radiation Budget (ScaRaB) is a scanning radiative budget instrument, which has already been launched twice on Russian satellites. The basic measurements of ScaRaB are the radiances in two wide channels, a solar channel (0.2 - 4 μm), and a total channel (0.2 - 200 μm), allowing to derive longwave radiances. The resolution at nadir will be 40 km (25 mi) from an orbit at 870 km (540 mi). The procedures of calibration and processing of the data in order to derive fluxes from the original radiances have been set up and tested by CNES and LMD.
- Radio Occultation Sensor for Vertical Profiling of Temperature and Humidity (ROSA) procured from Italy for vertical profiling of temperature and humidity.

== Launch ==
The Megha-Tropiques satellite was successfully placed in an 867 km (539 mi) orbit with an inclination of 20 degrees to the equator by the Indian Space Research Organisation through its Polar Satellite Launch Vehicle (PSLV-C18) on October 12, 2011. The PSLV-C18 was launched at 11:00 am on October 12, 2011, from the first launch pad of the Satish Dhawan Space Centre (SHAR) located in Sriharikota, Andhra Pradesh. The satellite was placed in orbit along with three micro satellites: the 10.9 kg (24 lb) SRMSAT built by the SRM University, Chennai, the 3 kg (6.6 lb) remote sensing satellite Jugnu from the Indian Institute of Technology Kanpur(IIT Kanpur) and the 28.7 kg (63 lb) VesselSat-1 of Luxembourg to locate ships on high seas.

== End of mission ==
The original mission life was three years. The mission was extended by two years on 26 May 2015. The mission was further extended by four years on 7 October 2016.

In April 2022, ISRO announced the end of mission for the satellite because of issues with the attitude control sub-system. Megha-Tropiques was located at an 870 km orbit, which was to be lowered to 300 km to prepare for the eventual disposal of the satellite.

Starting from August 2022, Megha-Tropiques' orbit was lowered through a series of maneuvers. On 7 March 2023, Megha-Tropiques was successfully deorbited after conducting two final de-boost burns.

== See also ==
- SARAL
- TRISHNA
