= Automatic identification system =

Tracking system using transceivers on ships

- Acronym: AIS

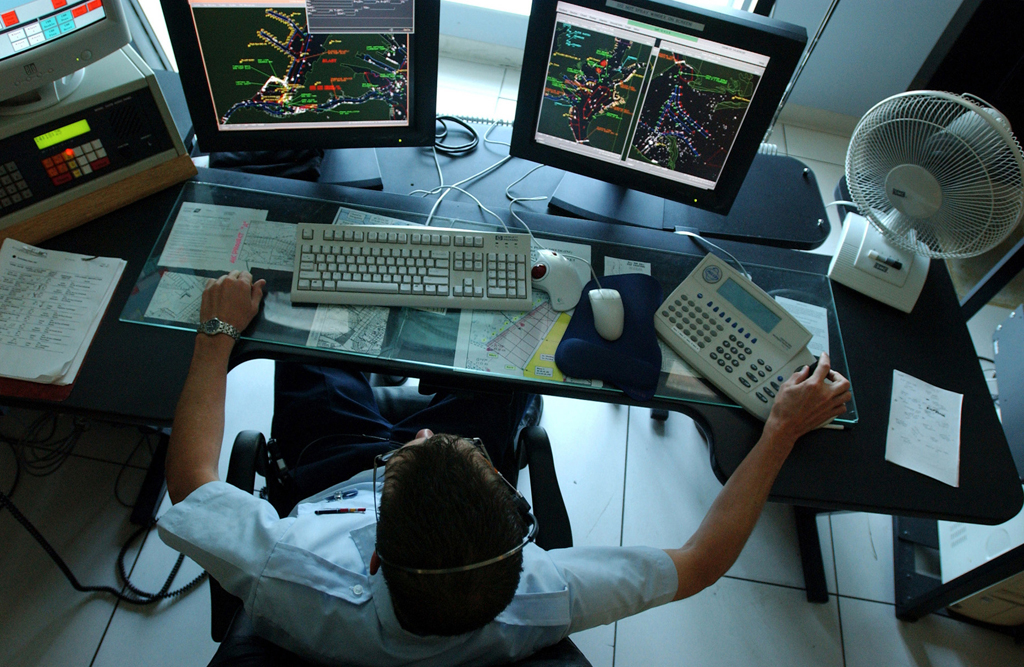
A U.S. Coast Guard Operations Specialist using AIS and radar to manage vessel traffic.

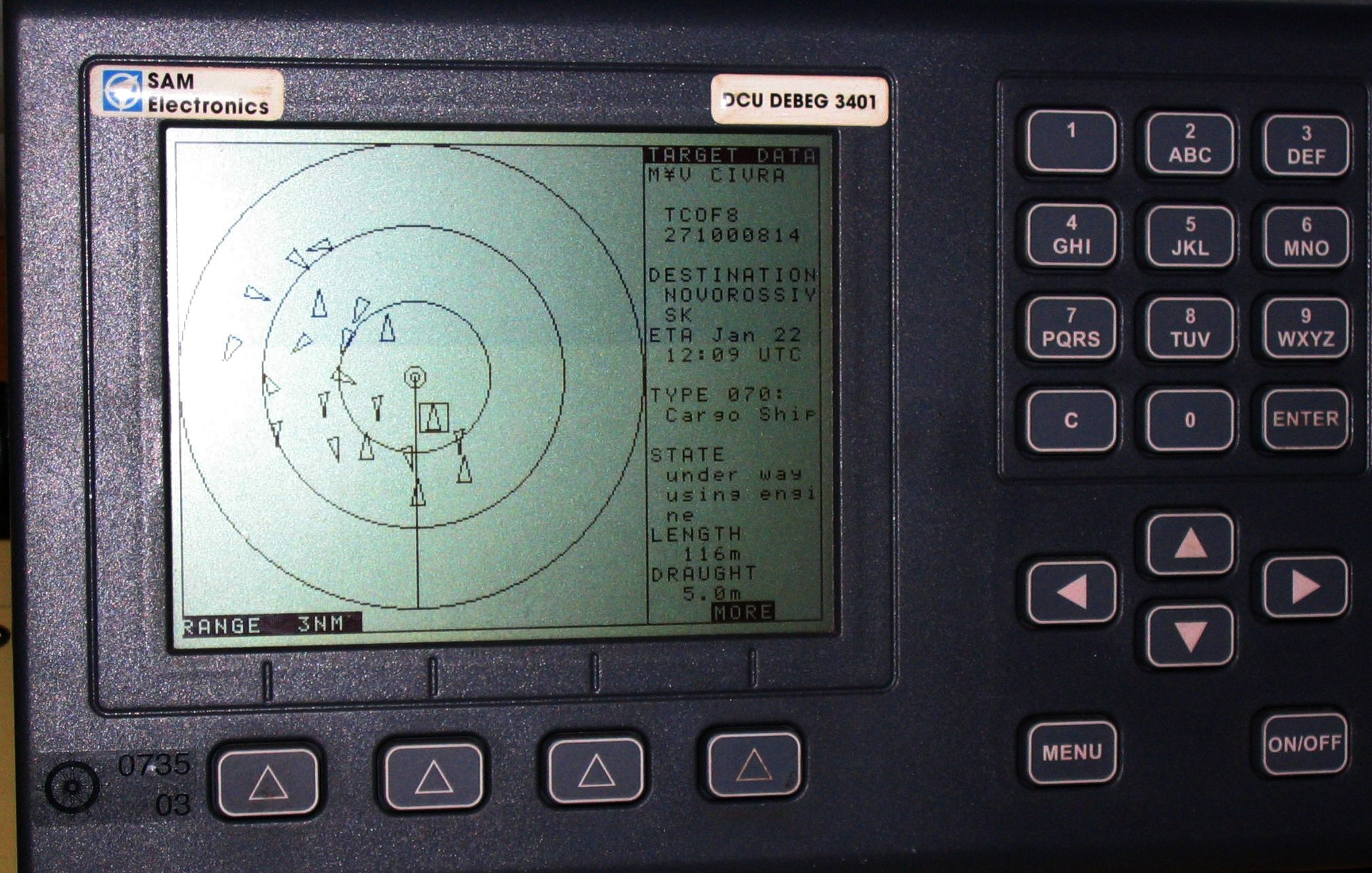
An AIS-equipped system on board a ship presents the bearing and distance of nearby vessels in a radar-like display format.

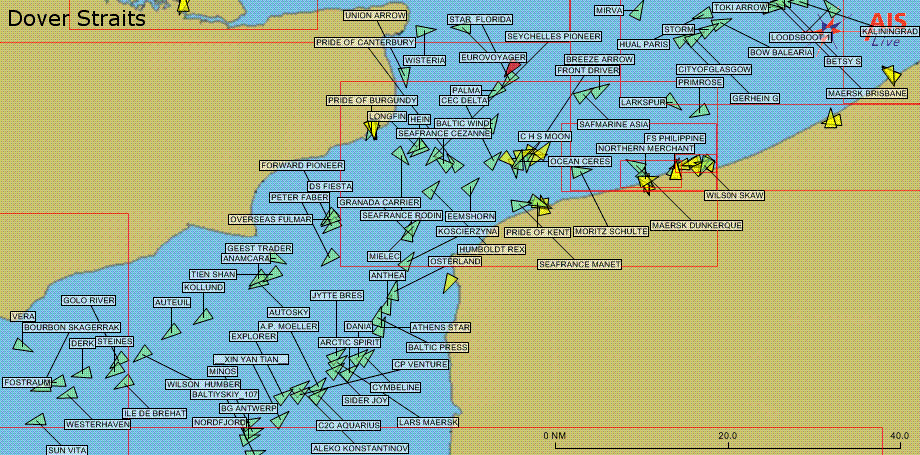
A graphical display of AIS data on board a ship.

External videos
- AIS - Automatic Identification System (Videotel/2004)

The automatic identification system (AIS) is an automatic tracking system that uses transponders on ships and is used by vessel traffic services (VTS). Originally designed as a terrestrial communication system (ship to ship; ship to shore), satellites are now also used to passively capture the signal traffic. With a few exceptions, AIS traffic is in the form of continual status announcements of a sender to all interested parties in its proximity. AIS information supplements marine radar, which continues to be the primary method of collision avoidance for water transport, since AIS relies on the accuracy of information transmitted by other vessels, whereas radar independently detects objects. Although technically and operationally distinct, AIS is analogous to the ADS-B system which performs a similar function for aircraft.

Information provided by AIS equipment, such as unique identification, position, course, and speed, can be displayed on a screen or on an electronic chart display and information system (ECDIS). AIS is intended to assist a vessel's watchstanding officers and to allow maritime authorities to track and monitor vessel movements. AIS integrates a standardized VHF transceiver with a positioning system such as a Global Positioning System receiver, with other electronic navigation sensors, such as a gyrocompass or rate of turn indicator.

The International Maritime Organization's International Convention for the Safety of Life at Sea requires AIS to be fitted aboard international voyaging ships with 300 or more gross tonnage (GT), and all passenger ships regardless of size. For a variety of reasons, ships can turn off their AIS transceivers. As of 2021, there were more than 1,644,000 ships equipped with AIS.

AIS offers essentially no security and relies on the cooperation of the participants and on the enforcement of its rules by law and on plausibility evaluation.

== Viewing and using AIS data ==
AIS is intended, primarily, to allow ships to view marine traffic in their area and to be seen by that traffic. This requires a dedicated VHF AIS transceiver that allows local traffic to be viewed on an AIS enabled chartplotter or computer monitor while transmitting information about the ship itself to other AIS receivers. Port authorities or other shore-based facilities may be equipped with receivers only, so that they can view the local traffic without the need to transmit their own location. All AIS transceivers equipped traffic can be viewed this way very reliably but is limited to the VHF range, about 10–20 nautical miles.

If a suitable chartplotter is not available, local area AIS transceiver signals may be viewed via a computer using one of several computer applications such as ShipPlotter, GNU AIS or OpenCPN. These demodulate the signal from a modified marine VHF radiotelephone tuned to the AIS frequencies and convert into a digital format that the computer can read and display on a monitor; this data may then be shared via a local or wide area network but will still be limited to the collective range of the radio receivers used in the network. Because computer AIS monitoring applications and normal VHF radio transceivers do not possess AIS transceivers, they may be used by shore-based facilities that have no need to transmit or as an inexpensive alternative to a dedicated AIS device for smaller vessels to view local traffic but, of course, the user will remain unseen by other traffic on the network.

A secondary, unplanned and emerging use for AIS data is to make it viewable publicly, on the internet, without the need for an AIS receiver. Global AIS transceiver data collected from both satellite and internet-connected shore-based stations are aggregated and made available on the internet through a number of service providers. Data aggregated this way can be viewed on any internet-capable device to provide near global, real-time position data from anywhere in the world. Typical data includes vessel name, details, location, speed and heading on a map, is searchable, has potentially unlimited, global range and the history is archived. Most of this data is free of charge but satellite data and special services such as searching the archives are usually supplied at a cost. The data is a read-only view and the users will not be seen on the AIS network itself. Shore-based AIS receivers contributing to the internet are mostly run by a large number of volunteers. AIS mobile apps are also readily available for use with Android, Windows and iOS devices. See External links below for a list of internet-based AIS service providers. Ship owners and cargo dispatchers use these services to find and track vessels and their cargoes while marine enthusiasts may add to their photograph collections.

== Deployment history ==
At the simplest level, AIS operates between pairs of radio transceivers, one of which is always on a vessel. The other may be on a vessel, on-shore, or on a satellite. Respectively, these represent ship to ship, ship to shore, and ship to satellite operation and follow in that order.

=== Vessel-based AIS transceivers ===
The 2002 IMO SOLAS Agreement included a mandate that required most vessels over 300GT on international voyages to fit a Class A type AIS transceiver. This was the first mandate for the use of AIS equipment and affected approximately 100,000 vessels.

In 2006, the AIS standards committee published the Class B type AIS transceiver specification, designed to enable a simpler and lower-cost AIS device. Low-cost Class B transceivers became available in the same year triggering mandate adoptions by numerous countries and making large-scale installation of AIS devices on vessels of all sizes commercially viable.

Since 2006, the AIS technical standard committees have continued to evolve the AIS standard and product types to cover a wide range of applications from the largest vessel to small fishing vessels and life boats. In parallel, governments and authorities have instigated projects to fit varying classes of vessels with an AIS device to improve safety and security. Most mandates are focused on commercial vessels, with leisure vessels selectively choosing to fit. In 2010, most commercial vessels operating on the European Inland Waterways were required to fit an Inland waterway certified Class A, all EU fishing boats over 15m must have a Class A by May 2014, and the US has a long-pending extension to their existing AIS fit rules which is expected to come into force during 2013. It is estimated that as of 2012, some 250,000 vessels have fitted an AIS transceiver of some type, with a further 1 million required to do so in the near future, and even larger projects under consideration. 1

=== Terrestrial-based AIS (T-AIS) ===
T-AIS refers to communication between ships and between ships and near-coast land stations. T-AIS range is approximately limited by line of sight, typically to a maximum of about 74 kilometres (46 mi) and for a land based station visibility is lost beyond coastal waters. In addition to port and maritime authority operated transceivers, there is a large network of privately owned ones as well.

T-AIS is sufficient for ship collision avoidance, but does not allow for the comprehensive collection of global AIS data.

=== Satellite-based AIS (S-AIS) ===
In the 1990s, AIS was not anticipated to be detectable from space. But AIS has much longer vertical than horizontal reach and can be received by satellites in low Earth orbit with altitudes above 500 km. The reuse of frequencies by senders which are out of view of each other on the surface, but simultaneously in view of a satellite, creates the principal technical challenge for the reliable reception of AIS messages by satellite. In other words, the detection footprint of a satellite is much larger than the AIS network cell size. S-AIS could enable truly global AIS coverage, but because of its limitations will never match the reception performance and near-zero latency of the terrestrial network. Satellites augment rather than replace the terrestrial system.

Since 2005, various entities have been experimenting with detecting AIS transmissions using satellite-based receivers and, since 2008, companies such as L3Harris, exactEarth, ORBCOMM, Spacequest, Spire and also government programs have deployed AIS receivers on satellites.

The two nCube cubesats built by Norwegian university students (nCube-2 launched October 27, 2005 and nCube-1 launched July 26, 2006) were both failures. They would have attempted to track ships and an AIS-carrying reindeer.

AIS satellite launches 2006-2018
No	Mission	Launch	Organization	Orbit	Period	Perigee	Apogee	Inclination	Weight
					minutes	km			kg
1	TacSat-2	Dec 2006	USAF AFRL	Circular	92.9	413	424	40°	367
2	CanX-6 (EV-0)	Apr 2008	COM DEV	SSO	96.9	604	626	97.6°	6.5
3	Orbcomm CDS-3	Jun 2008	Orbcomm	Circular	97.8	653	663	48.5°	80
4	AprizeSat-3	Jul 2009	Aprize	SSO	96.8	562	686	98.3°	12
5	AprizeSat-4	Jul 2009	Aprize	SSO	96.8	562	686	98.3°	12
6	Rubin-9.1	Sep 2009	LuxSpace	SSO	99.9	720	799	98.0°	8
7	Rubin-9.2	Sep 2009	LuxSpace	SSO	99.9	720	799	98.0°	8
8	Sumban dilaSat	Sep 2009	SunSpace/CSIR	SSO	92.4	401	402	97.1°	82
9	AISSat-1	Jul 2010	FFI	SSO	96.9	610	624	98.1°	7
10	ResourceSat-2 (EV-2)	Apr 2011	ISRO	SSO	101.3	813	825	98.8°	1,200
11	AprizeSat-5 (EV-5)	Aug 2011	exactEarth	SSO	97.8	828	693	98.3°	12
12	AprizeSat-6 (EV-6)	Aug 2011	exactEarth	SSO	97.8	828	693	98.3°	12
13	VesselSat-1	Oct 2011	LuxSpace	Circular	102	853	873	20°	29
14	VesselSat-2	Jan 2012	LuxSpace	SSO	94	472	484	97.5°	29
15	SDS-4	May 2012	JAXA	SSO	97.9	662	671	98.4°	50
16	ExactView-1 (EV-1)	Jul 2012	exactEarth	SSO	101	811	827	99.1°	100
17	AAUSAT3	Feb 2013	Aalborg University	SSO	100	771	789	98.5°	0.8
18	AprizeSat-7 (EV-5R)	Nov 2013	exactEarth	SSO	97	594	654	97.6°	12
19	AprizeSat-8 (EV-12)	Nov 2013	exactEarth	SSO	97	595	670	97.6°	12
20	AprizeSat-9 (EV-11)	Jun 2014	exactEarth	SSO	98	618	719	97.8°	12
21	AprizeSat-10 (EV-13)	Jun 2014	SpaceQuest	SSO	98	618	737	97.8°	12
22	AISSat-2	Jul 2014	FFI	SSO	97.1	625	632	98.4°	7
23-28	6xOG2	Jul 2014	Orbcomm	Circular	99	715	719	47°	216
29	ExactView-9 (EV-9) (Note: 20×20×20 cm based on SFL Generic Nanosatellite Bus)	Sep 2015	exactEarth	Equatorial	97.5	642	653	6°	5.5
30-40	11xOG2	Dec 2015	Orbcomm	Circular	99	715	719	47°	216
41	M3MSat (EV-7)	Jun 2016	Canadian Govt.	SSO	94.7	502	519	97.4°	95
42	NorSat-1	Jul 2017	NSC	SSO	96.6	593	610	97.6°	30
43	NorSat-2	Jul 2017	NSC	SSO	96.6	593	610	97.6°	16
44	GOMX-4A	Feb 2018	Gom Space	SSO	94.5	489	515	97.3°	
45	GOMX-4B	Feb 2018	Gom Space	SSO	94.5	489	515	97.3°	

On December 16, 2006, Air Force Research Laboratory's TacSat-2 was launched and became the first satellite to successfully capture AIS signals. It featured a phased array antenna.

On July 29, 2009, SpaceQuest launched AprizeSat-3 and AprizeSat-4. Both were commissioned one hour after separation and began collecting data on their second orbit. In the first 160 minutes, 200,000 AIS messages were captured. They were able to receive the U.S. Coast Guard's SART test beacons off of Hawaii in 2010. In July 2010, SpaceQuest and exactEarth of Canada announced an arrangement whereby data from AprizeSat-3 and AprizeSat-4 would be incorporated into the exactEarth system and made available worldwide as part of their exactAIS(TM)service.

NASA video demonstrating the advantages of the Norwegian AIS satellite program, illustrated by the AIS transceiver on board the International Space Station.

On June 1, 2010, the NORAIS SDR receiver on board the International Space Station (apogee: 422 km) was switched on and was a technology demonstration success: on a typical good day 400,000 position reports were receivable from 22,000 senders. An October 2011 report stated a total of 110 million received messages from 82,000 unique MMSI numbers. NORAIS-1 had received a total of 350 million AIS messages from 142,000 unique ships during 213 weeks in operation when it was replaced with the NORAIS-2 hardware upgrade on February 1, 2015. NORAIS-2 could receive all four AIS channels simultaneously.

In 2009, ORBCOMM launched AIS enabled satellites in conjunction with a US Coast Guard contract to demonstrate the ability to collect AIS messages from space. In 2009, Luxspace, a Luxembourg-based company, launched the RUBIN-9.1 satellite (AIS Pathfinder 2). The satellite is operated in cooperation with SES and REDU Space Services. In late 2011 and early 2012, ORBCOMM and Luxspace launched the Vesselsat AIS microsatellites, one in an equatorial orbit and the other in a polar orbit (VesselSat-2 and VesselSat-1).

On July 12, 2010, the Norwegian AISSat-1 low earth orbit nano satellite was successfully launched as a secondary payload into polar orbit. The purpose of the satellite was to improve surveillance of maritime activities in the High North. AISSat-2 launched July 8, 2014 with the same mission parameters and lasted until October 2023. The AISSat-3 launch vehicle failed on November 28, 2017. AISSat-4 is slated for a 2026 launch.

On 20 April 2011, Indian Space Research Organisation launched Resourcesat-2 containing a S-AIS payload for monitoring maritime traffic in the Indian Ocean Search & Rescue (SAR) zone. AIS data is processed at National Remote Sensing Centre and archived at Indian Space Science Data Centre.

On February 25, 2013—after one year launch delay—Aalborg University launched AAUSAT3. It is a 1U cubesat, weights 800 grams, solely developed by students from the Department of Electronic Systems. It carries two AIS receivers—a traditional and a SDR-based receiver. The project was proposed and sponsored by the Danish Maritime Safety Administration. It has been a huge success and has in the first 100 days downloaded more than 800,000 AIS messages and several 1 MHz raw samples of radio signals. It receives both AIS channels simultaneously and has received class A as well as class B messages. Cost including launch was less than €200,000.

Canadian-based exactEarth's AIS satellite network provides global coverage using 8 satellites. Between January 2017 and January 2019, this network was significantly expanded through a partnership with L3Harris Corporation with 58 hosted payloads on the Iridium NEXT constellation. Additionally exactEarth is involved in the development of ABSEA technology which will enable its network to reliably detect a high proportion of Class B type messages, as well as Class A.

ORBCOMM operates a global satellite network that includes 18 AIS-enabled satellites. ORBCOMM's OG2 (ORBCOMM Generation 2) satellites are equipped with an Automatic Identification System (AIS) payload to receive and report transmissions from AIS-equipped vessels for ship tracking and other maritime navigational and safety efforts, and download at ORBCOMM's sixteen existing earth stations around the globe.

In July 2014, ORBCOMM launched the first 6 OG2 satellites aboard a SpaceX Falcon 9 rocket from Cape Canaveral, Florida. Each OG2 satellite carries an AIS receiver payload. All 6 OG2 satellites were successfully deployed into orbit and started sending telemetry to ORBCOMM soon after launch. In December 2015, the company launched 11 additional AIS-enabled OG2 satellites aboard the SpaceX Falcon 9 rocket. This dedicated launch marked ORBCOMM's second and final OG2 mission to complete its next-generation satellite constellation. Compared to its current OG1 satellites, ORBCOMM's OG2 satellites are designed for faster message delivery, larger message sizes and better coverage at higher latitudes, while increasing network capacity.

In August 2017, Spire Global Inc. released an API that delivers S-AIS data enhanced with machine learning (Vessels and Predict) backed by its 40+ constellation of nano-satellites.

The HawkEye 360 constellation of satellites processes AIS as a part of their RF geospatial intelligence products.

==== Correlation of data sources ====
Correlating optical and radar imagery with S-AIS signatures enables the end-user to rapidly identify all types of vessel. A great strength of S-AIS is the ease with which it can be correlated with additional information from other sources such as radar, optical, ESM, and more SAR related tools such as GMDSS SARSAT and AMVER. Satellite-based radar and other sources can contribute to maritime surveillance by detecting all vessels in specific maritime areas of interest, a particularly useful attribute when trying to co-ordinate a long-range rescue effort or when dealing with VTS issues.

=== VHF Data Exchange System ===
Due to its growing use over time, in some coastal areas (e.g., the Singapore Strait, China's megaports, parts of Japan) there are so many vessels that the performance of AIS has been affected. As traffic density goes up, the system's range goes down, and the frequency of updates becomes more random. For this reason VHF Data Exchange System (VDES) has been developed: it will operate on additional new frequencies and will use them more efficiently, enabling thirty-two times as much bandwidth for secure communications and e-navigation. VDES is defined in ITU M.2092.

== Applications ==
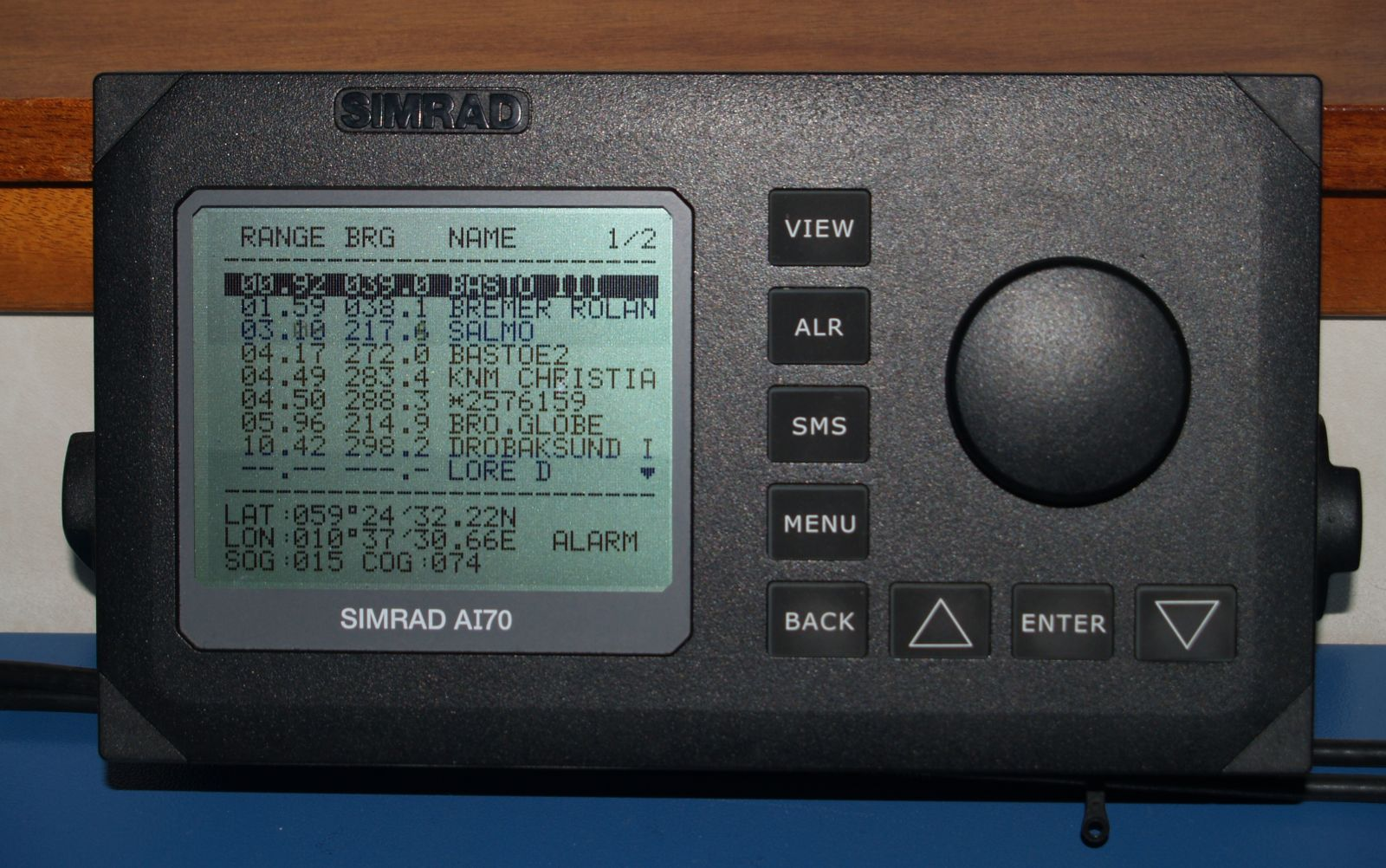
A vessel's text-only AIS display, listing nearby vessels' range, bearings, and names

The original purpose of AIS was solely collision avoidance but many other applications have since developed and continue to be developed. AIS is currently used for:

Collision avoidance
AIS was developed by the IMO technical committees as a technology to avoid collisions among large vessels at sea that are not within range of shore-based systems. The technology identifies every vessel individually, along with its specific position and movements, enabling a virtual picture to be created in real time. The AIS standards include a variety of automatic calculations based on these position reports such as Closest Point of Approach (CPA) and collision alarms. As AIS is not used by all vessels, AIS is usually used in conjunction with radar. When a ship is navigating at sea, information about the movement and identity of other ships in the vicinity is critical for navigators to make decisions to avoid collision with other ships and dangers (shoal or rocks). Visual observation (e.g., unaided, binoculars, and night vision), audio exchanges (e.g., whistle, horns, and VHF radio), and radar or automatic radar plotting aid are historically used for this purpose. These preventive mechanisms sometimes fail due to time delays, radar limitations, miscalculations, and display malfunctions, and can result in a collision. While requirements of AIS are to display only very basic text information, the data obtained can be integrated with a graphical electronic chart or a radar display, providing consolidated navigational information on a single display.
Fishing fleet monitoring and control
AIS is widely used by national authorities to track and monitor the activities of their national fishing fleets. AIS enables authorities to reliably and cost effectively monitor fishing vessel activities along their coast line, typically out to a range of 100 km (60 mi), depending on location and quality of coast based receivers/base stations with supplementary data from satellite based networks.
Maritime security
AIS enables authorities to identify specific vessels and their activity within or near a nation's Exclusive Economic Zone. When AIS data is fused with existing radar systems, authorities are able to differentiate between vessels more easily. AIS data can be automatically processed to create normalized activity patterns for individual vessels, which when breached, create an alert, thus highlighting potential threats for more efficient use of security assets. AIS improves maritime domain awareness and allows for heightened security and control. Additionally, AIS can be applied to freshwater river systems and lakes.
Aids to navigation
The AIS aids to navigation (AtoN) product standard was developed with the ability to broadcast the positions and names of objects other than vessels, such as navigational aid and marker positions and dynamic data reflecting the marker's environment (e.g., currents and climatic conditions). These aids can be located on shore, such as in a lighthouse, or on water, platforms, or buoys. The U.S. Coast Guard has suggested that AIS might replace racon (radar beacons) currently used for electronic navigation aids. AtoNs enable authorities to remotely monitor the status of a buoy, such as the status of the lantern, as well as transmit live data from sensors (such as weather and sea state) located on the buoy back to vessels fitted with AIS transceivers or local authorities. An AtoN will broadcast its position and Identity along with all the other information. The AtoN standard also permits the transmit of 'Virtual AtoN' positions whereby a single device may transmit messages with a 'false' position such that an AtoN marker appears on electronic charts, although a physical AtoN may not be present at that location.
Search and rescue
For coordinating on-scene resources of a marine search and rescue (SAR) operation, it is imperative to have data on the position and navigation status of other ships in the vicinity. In such cases, AIS can provide additional information and enhance awareness of available resources, even if the AIS range is limited to VHF radio range. The AIS standard also envisioned the possible use on SAR aircraft, and included a message (AIS Message 9) for aircraft to report their position. To aid SAR vessels and aircraft in locating people in distress, the specification (IEC 61097-14 Ed 1.0) for an AIS-based SAR transmitter (AIS-SART) was developed by the IEC's TC80 AIS work group. AIS-SART was added to Global Maritime Distress Safety System regulations effective January 1, 2010. AIS-SARTs have been available on the market since at least 2009. Recent regulations have mandated the installation of AIS systems on all Safety Of Life At Sea (SOLAS) vessels and vessels over 300 tons.
Accident investigation
AIS information received by VTS is important for accident investigation since it provides accurate historical data on time, identity, GPS-based position, compass heading, course over ground, speed (by log/SOG), and rates of turn, rather than the less accurate information provided by radar. A more complete picture of the events could be obtained by Voyage Data Recorder (VDR) data if available and maintained on board for details of the movement of the ship, voice communication and radar pictures during the accidents. However, VDR data are not maintained due to the limited twelve hours storage by IMO requirement.
Ocean currents estimates
Ocean surface current estimates based on the analysis of AIS data have been available from French company, e-Odyn, since December 2015.
Infrastructure protection
AIS information can be used by owners of marine seabed infrastructure, such as cables or pipelines, to monitor the activities of vessels close to their assets in close to real time. This information can then be used to trigger alerts to inform the owner and potentially avoid an incident where damage to the asset might occur.
Fleet and cargo tracking
Internet disseminated AIS can be used by fleet or ship managers to keep track of the global location of their ships. Cargo dispatchers, or the owners of goods in transit can track the progress of cargo and anticipate arrival times in port.
Statistics and economics
the United Nations Statistics Division organized the AIS Data Week to experiment with AIS data analysis and provide statistics to the UN Global Platform. It covered a number of use case studies by various statistical offices, and the AIS Handbook was developed to capture the experience from this experimentation:
- Faster economic indicators: time in port and port traffic
- Maritime indicators
- Official maritime statistics: port visits
- Completing statistics on inland waterways
- Mapping fishery activities
- Ships in distress
- Greenhouse gas emissions of ships (NO_{x}, SO_{x}, and CO_{2} calculation)
- Nowcasting of trade flows in real-time
- Experimental statistics of daily number of vessels
- Real-time data on seaborne dry bulk commodities

== Mechanism ==
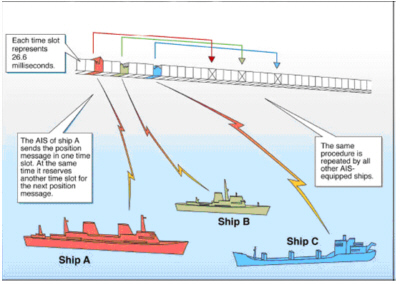
System overview from US Coast Guard

=== Basic overview ===
AIS transceivers automatically broadcast information, such as their position, speed, and navigational status, at regular intervals via a VHF transmitter built into the transceiver. The information originates from the ship's navigational sensors, typically its global navigation satellite system (GNSS) receiver and gyrocompass. Other information, such as the vessel name and VHF call sign, is programmed when installing the equipment and is also transmitted regularly. The signals are received by AIS transceivers fitted on other ships or on land based systems, such as VTS systems. The received information can be displayed on a screen or chart plotter, showing the other vessels' positions in much the same manner as a radar display. Data is broadcast (one sender to every interested receiver) and multiple access (collision avoidance) is handled with SOTDMA.

The AIS standard comprises several substandards called "types" that specify individual product types. The major product types described in the AIS system standards are:

Class A
Vessel-mounted AIS transceiver which operates using SOTDMA. Targeted at large commercial vessels, SOTDMA requires a transceiver to maintain a constantly updated slot map in its memory such that it has prior knowledge of slots which are available for it to transmit. SOTDMA transceivers will then pre-announce their transmission, effectively reserving their transmit slot. SOTDMA transmissions are therefore prioritised within the AIS system. This is achieved through 2 receivers in continuous operation. Class A units must have an integrated display, transmit at 12.5 W, interface capability with multiple ship systems, and offer a sophisticated selection of features and functions. Default transmit rate is every few seconds. AIS Class A type compliant devices receive all types of AIS messages.
Class B
There are now two separate IMO specifications for Class B transceivers (aimed at lighter commercial and leisure markets): a carrier-sense time-division multiple-access (CSTDMA) system, and a system that uses SOTDMA (as in Class A).
In the original CSTDMA-based system, defined in ITU M.1371-0 and now called Class B "CS" (or unofficially as Class B/CS), transceivers listen to the slot map immediately prior to transmitting and seek a slot where the 'noise' in the slot is the same (or similar) to background noise, thereby indicating that the slot is not being used by another AIS device. Class B "CS" transmits at 2 W and is not required to have an integrated display: Class B "CS" units can be connected to most display systems where the received messages will be displayed in lists or overlaid on charts. Default transmit rate is normally every thirty seconds, but this can be varied according to vessel speed or instructions from base stations. The Class B "CS" standard requires integrated GPS and certain LED indicators. Class B "CS" equipment receives all types of AIS messages.
The newer SOTDMA Class B "SO" system, sometimes referred to as Class B/SO or Class B+, leverages the same time slot finding algorithm as Class A, and has the same transmission priority as Class A transmitters, helping to guarantee that it will always be able to transmit. The Class B "SO" technology will also change its rate of transmission depending on the speed the vessel is going, up to every five seconds over 23 knots, instead of the constant rate of every thirty seconds in Class B "CS". Finally Class B "SO" will also broadcast at a power of 5 W instead of the previous 2 W of Class B "CS".
Base station
Shore-based AIS transceiver (transmit and receive) which operates using SOTDMA. Base stations have a complex set of features and functions which in the AIS standard are able to control the AIS system and all devices operating therein. Ability to interrogate individual transceivers for status reports and or transmit frequency changes.
Aids to navigation (AtoN)
Shore- or buoy-based transceiver (transmit and receive) which operates using fixed-access time-division multiple-access (FATDMA). Designed to collect and transmit data related to sea and weather conditions as well as relay AIS messages to extend network coverage.
Search and rescue transceiver (SART)
Specialist AIS device created as an emergency distress beacon which operates using pre-announce time-division multiple-access (PATDMA), or sometimes called a "modified SOTDMA". The device randomly selects a slot to transmit and will transmit a burst of eight messages per minute to maximize the probability of successful transmission. A SART is required to transmit up to a maximum of five miles and transmits a special message format recognised by other AIS devices. The device is designed for periodic use and only in emergencies due to its PATDMA-type operation which places stress on the slot map.
Specialist AIS transceivers
Despite there being IMO/IEC published AIS specifications, a number of authorities have permitted and encouraged the development of hybrid AIS devices. These devices seek to maintain the integrity of the core AIS transmission structure and design to ensure operational reliability, but to add a range of additional features and functions to suit their specific requirements. The "Identifier" AIS transceiver is one such product where the core Class B CSTDMA technology is designed to ensure that the device transmits in complete compliance with the IMO specifications, but a number of changes have been made to enable it to be battery powered, low cost and more easy to install and deploy in large numbers. Such devices will not have international certification against an IMO specification since they will comply with a proportion of the relevant specification. Typically authorities will make their own detailed technical evaluation and test to ensure that the core operation of the device does not harm the international AIS system.

AIS receivers are not specified in the AIS standards, because they do not transmit. The main threat to the integrity of any AIS system are non-compliant AIS transmissions, hence careful specifications of all transmitting AIS devices. However, AIS transceivers all transmit on multiple channels as required by the AIS standards. Consequently, single-channel or multiplexed receivers will not receive all AIS messages. Only dual-channel receivers will receive all AIS messages.

=== Type testing and approval ===
AIS is a technology which has been developed under the auspices of the IMO by its technical committees. The technical committees have developed and published a series of AIS product specifications. Each specification defines a specific AIS product which has been carefully created to work in a precise way with all the other defined AIS devices, thus ensuring AIS system interoperability worldwide. Maintenance of the specification integrity is deemed critical for the performance of the AIS system and the safety of vessels and authorities using the technology. As such most countries require that AIS products are independently tested and certified to comply with a specific published specification. Products that have not been tested and certified by a competent authority, may not conform to the required AIS published specification and therefore may not operate as expected in the field. The most widely recognized and accepted certifications are the R&TTE Directive, the U.S. Federal Communications Commission, and Industry Canada, all of which require independent verification by a qualified and independent testing agency.

=== Message types ===
There are 27 different types of top level messages defined in ITU M.1371-5 (out of a possibility of 64) that can be sent by AIS transceivers.

AIS messages 6, 8, 25, and 26 provide "Application Specific Messages" (ASM), that allow "competent authorities" to define additional AIS message subtypes. There are both "addressed" (ABM) and "broadcast" (BBM) variants of the message. Addressed messages, while containing a destination MMSI, are not private and may be decoded by any receiver.

One of the first uses of ASMs was the Saint Lawrence Seaway use of AIS binary messages (message type 8) to provide information about water levels, lock orders, and weather. The Panama Canal uses AIS type 8 messages to provide information about rain along the canal and wind in the locks. In 2010, the International Maritime Organization issued Circular 289 that defines the next iteration of ASMs for type 6 and 8 messages. Alexander, Schwehr and Zetterberg proposed that the community of competent authorities work together to maintain a regional register of these messages and their locations of use. The International Association of Marine Aids to Navigation and Lighthouse Authorities (IALA-AISM) now established a process for collection of regional application-specific messages.

=== Detailed description: Class A units ===
Each AIS transceiver consists of one VHF transmitter, two VHF TDMA receivers, one VHF Digital Selective Calling (DSC) receiver, and links to shipboard display and sensor systems via standard marine electronic communications (such as NMEA 0183, also known as IEC 61162). Timing is vital to the proper synchronization and slot mapping (transmission scheduling) for a Class A unit. Therefore, every unit is required to have an internal time base, synchronized to a global navigation satellite system (e.g. GPS) receiver. This internal receiver may also be used for position information. However, position is typically provided by an external receiver such as GPS, LORAN-C or an inertial navigation system and the internal receiver is only used as a backup for position information. Other information broadcast by the AIS, if available, is electronically obtained from shipboard equipment through standard marine data connections. Heading information, position (latitude and longitude), "speed over ground", and rate of turn are normally provided by all ships equipped with AIS. Other information, such as destination, and ETA may also be provided.

Each AIS station determines its own transmission schedule (slot), based upon data link traffic history and an awareness of probable future actions by other stations. A position report from one station fits into one of 2,250 time slots established every 60 seconds on each frequency. AIS stations continuously synchronize themselves to each other, to avoid overlap of slot transmissions. Slot selection by an AIS station is randomized within a defined interval and tagged with a random timeout of between 4 and 8 minutes. When a station changes its slot assignment, it announces both the new location and the timeout for that location. In this way new stations, including those stations which suddenly come within radio range close to other vessels, will always be received by those vessels.

The required ship reporting capacity according to the IMO performance standard is a minimum of 2,000 time slots per minute, though the system provides 4,500 time slots per minute. The SOTDMA broadcast mode allows the system to be overloaded by 400 to 500% through sharing of slots, and still provides nearly 100% throughput for ships closer than 8 to 10 nmi to each other in a ship to ship mode. In the event of system overload, only targets further away will be subject to drop-out, in order to give preference to nearer targets, which are of greater concern to ship operators. In practice, the capacity of the system is nearly unlimited, allowing for a great number of ships to be accommodated at the same time.

The system coverage range is similar to other VHF applications. The range of any VHF radio is determined by multiple factors, the primary factors are: the height and quality of the transmitting antenna and the height and quality of the receiving antenna. Its propagation is better than that of radar, due to the longer wavelength, so it is possible to reach around bends and behind islands if the land masses are not too high. The look-ahead distance at sea is nominally 20 nmi (37 km). With the help of repeater stations, the coverage for both ship and VTS stations can be improved considerably.

The system is backward compatible with digital selective calling systems, allowing shore-based GMDSS systems to inexpensively establish AIS operating channels and identify and track AIS-equipped vessels, and is intended to fully replace existing DSC-based transceiver systems.

Shore-based AIS network systems are now being built up around the world. One of the biggest fully operational, real time systems with full routing capability is in China. This system was built between 2003 and 2007 and was delivered by Saab TranspondereTech. The entire Chinese coastline is covered with approximately 250 base stations in hot-standby configurations including 70 computer servers in three main regions. Hundreds of shore-based users, including about 25 vessel traffic service (VTS) centers, are connected to the network and are able to see the maritime picture, and can also communicate with each ship using SRMs (Safety Related Messages). All data are in real time. The system was designed to improve the safety and security of ships and port facilities. It is also designed according to an SOA architecture with socket based connection and using IEC AIS standardized protocol all the way to the VTS users. The base stations have hot-standby units (IEC 62320-1) and the network is the third generation network solution.

By the beginning of 2007, a new worldwide standard for AIS base stations was approved, the IEC 62320-1 standard. The old IALA recommendation and the new IEC 62320-1 standard are in some functions incompatible, and therefore attached network solutions have to be upgraded. This will not affect users, but system builders need to upgrade software to accommodate the new standard. A standard for AIS base stations has been long-awaited. Currently ad-hoc networks exist with class A mobiles. Base stations can control the AIS message traffic in a region, which will hopefully reduce the number of packet collisions.

==== Broadcast information ====
An AIS transceiver sends the following data every 2 to 10 seconds depending on a vessel's speed while underway, and every 3 minutes while a vessel is at anchor:

- Vessel Maritime Mobile Service Identity (MMSI): a unique nine digit identification number.
- Navigation status: e.g., "at anchor", "under way using engine(s)", "not under command", etc.
- Rate of turn: right or left, from 0 to 720 degrees per minute
- Speed over ground: 0.1-knot (0.19 km/h) resolution from 0 to 102 knots (189 km/h)
- Positional resolution:
  - Longitude: to 0.0001 arcminutes precision
  - Latitude: to 0.0001 arcminutes precision
- Course over ground: relative to true north to 0.1° precision
- True heading: 0 to 359° (for example from a gyro compass)
- True bearing at own position: 0 to 359°
- UTC seconds: The seconds field of the UTC time when these data were generated. A complete timestamp is not present.

The data can be used to calculate a ship trajectory for use in collision avoidance and vessel monitoring.

In addition, the following data are broadcast every 6 minutes:

- IMO ship identification number: a seven-digit number that remains unchanged upon transfer of the ship's registration to another country
- Radio call sign: international radio call sign, up to 7 characters, assigned to the vessel by its country of registry
- Name: 20 characters to represent the name of the vessel
- Type of ship/cargo
- Dimensions of ship, to nearest meter
- Location of positioning system's (e.g., GPS) antenna on board the vessel: in meters aft of bow and meters port or starboard
- Type of positioning system: such as GPS, DGPS or LORAN-C.
- Draught of ship: 0.1–25.5 meters
- Destination: max. 20 characters
- Estimated time of arrival (ETA) at destination: UTC month/date hour:minute
- Optional: high precision time request, a vessel can request other vessels provide a high precision UTC time- and date-stamp

=== Detailed description: Class B units ===
Class B transceivers are smaller, simpler and lower cost than Class A transceivers. Each consists of one VHF transmitter, two VHF Carrier Sense Time Division Multiple Access (CSTDMA) receivers, both alternating as the VHF Digital Selective Calling (DSC) receiver, and a GPS active antenna. Although the data output format supports heading information, in general units are not interfaced to a compass, so this data is seldom transmitted. Output is the standard AIS data stream at 38.400 kbit/s, as RS-232 and/or NMEA formats. To prevent overloading of the available bandwidth, transmission power is restricted to 2 W, giving a range of about 5–10 mi.

Four messages are defined for class B units:

Message 14
Safety Related Message: This message is transmitted on request for the user – some transceivers have a button that enables it to be sent, or it can be sent through the software interface. It sends a pre-defined safety message.
Message 18
Standard Class B CS Position Report: This message is sent every 3 minutes where speed over ground (SOG) is less than 2 knots, or every 30 seconds for greater speeds. MMSI, time, SOG, COG, longitude, latitude, true heading
Message 19
Extended Class B Equipment Position Report: This message was designed for the SOTDMA protocol, and is too long to be transmitted as CSTDMA. However a coast station can poll the transceiver for this message to be sent. MMSI, time, SOG, COG, longitude, latitude, true heading, ship type, dimensions.
Message 24
Class B CS Static Data Report: This message is sent every 6 minutes, the same time interval as for Class A transponders. Because of its length, this message is divided into two parts, sent within one minute of each other. This message was defined after the original AIS specifications, so some Class A units may need a firmware upgrade to be able to decode this message. MMSI, boat name, ship type, call sign, dimensions, and equipment vendor id.

=== Detailed description: AIS receivers ===
A number of manufacturers offer AIS receivers, designed for monitoring AIS traffic. These may have two receivers, for monitoring both frequencies simultaneously, or they may switch between frequencies (thereby missing messages on the other channel, but at reduced price). In general they will output RS-232, NMEA, USB or UDP data for display on electronic chart plotters or computers. As well as dedicated radios, software defined radios can be set up to receive the signal.

== Technical specification ==
=== RF characteristics ===
AIS uses the globally allocated Marine Band channels AIS 1 and AIS 2.

- Channel AIS 1: 161.975 MHz
- Channel AIS 2: 162.025 MHz

These two channels were made available for AIS by splitting the old voice duplex channels 87 and 88. These were split into channels 87A and 88A, now used for simplex voice, and 87B and 88B, renamed AIS 1 and AIS 2 and used solely for AIS.

Two separate channels are also allocated for satellite AIS.

- Channel 75: 156.775 MHz
- Channel 76: 156.825 MHz

These AIS channels are exclusively for use with AIS Message 27; a message formulated for easy reception by satellite.

Most AIS transmissions are composed of bursts of several messages. In these cases, between messages, the AIS transmitter must change channel.

Before being transmitted, AIS messages must be NRZI encoded.

AIS messages are transmitted using Gaussian minimum-shift keying (GMSK) modulation. The GMSK modulator bandwidth*time product used for transmission of data should be 0.4 maximum (highest nominal value).

The GMSK coded data should frequency modulate the VHF transmitter. The modulation index should be 0.5.

The transmission bit rate is 9600 bit/s

Ordinary VHF receivers can receive AIS with the filtering disabled (the filtering destroys the GMSK data). However, the audio output from the radio would need to be then decoded. There are several PC applications that can do this.

=== Message organization ===
As there are a multitude of automatic equipment transmitting AIS messages, to avoid conflict, the RF space is organized in frames. Each frame lasts exactly 1 minute and starts on each minute boundary. Each frame is divided into 2250 slots. As transmission can happen on 2 channels, there are 4500 available slots per minute. Depending on the type and status of equipment and the status of the AIS slot map, each AIS transmitter will send out messages using one of the following schemes:

1. Incremental time division multiple access (ITDMA)
2. Random access time division multiple access (RATDMA)
3. Fixed access time division multiple access (FATDMA)
4. Self-organizing time division multiple access (SOTDMA)

The ITDMA access scheme allows a device to pre-announce transmission slots of non-repeatable character, ITDMA slots should be marked so that they are reserved for one additional frame. This allows a device to pre-announce its allocations for autonomous and continuous operation.

ITDMA is used on three occasions:

- data link network entry;
- temporary changes and transitions in periodical reporting intervals;
- pre-announcement of safety related messages.

RATDMA is used when a device needs to allocate a slot, which has not been pre-announced. This is generally done for the first transmission slot, or for messages of a non-repeatable character.

FATDMA is used by base stations only. FATDMA allocated slots are used for repetitive messages.

SOTDMA is used by mobile devices operating in autonomous and continuous mode. The purpose of the access scheme is to offer an access algorithm which quickly resolves conflicts without intervention from controlling stations.

=== Message format ===
An AIS slot is 26.66 ms long. The data modulation is 9600 bit/s, so each slot has a maximum capacity of 256 bits. The framing is derived from the HDLC standard, described in ISO/IEC 13239:2002.

Each slot is structured as such: <8 bit ramp up><24 bit preamble><8 bit start flag><168 bit payload><16 bit CRC><8 bit stop flag><24 bit buffer>

- 24 bit preamble: this is a sequence of 0101...
- Start flag: 0x7e
- 168 bit payload, this is the body of an AIS message. For messages requiring more data, several slots (Maximum of 5) must be used.
- 16 bit CRC-16-CCITT: 16-bit polynomial to calculate the checksum.
- Stop flag: 0x7e
- 24 bit buffer used for bit stuffing, synchronization jitter and distance delay.

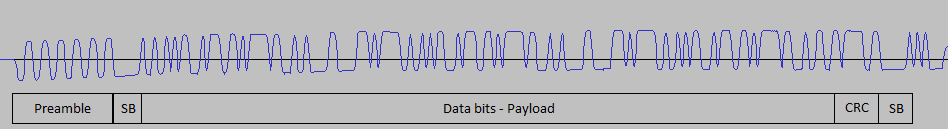
AIS message GMSK modulation signal example

Note that the signal on the VHF carrier is NRZI encoded and uses bit-stuffing to avoid unintentional stop-flags which may otherwise occur in the data. As such, the raw bits must first be decoded, and the stuffing bits removed, to arrive at the actual usable message format described above.

== Messages ==
=== Messages sent and received over the air ===
All AIS messages transmit 3 basic elements of information:

1. The MMSI number of the ship or equipment that holds the transmitter (base station, buoy, etc.)
2. The identification of the message being transmitted (See below table)
3. A repeat indicator that was designed to be used for repeating messages over obstacles by relay devices.

The following table gives a summary of all the currently used AIS messages.

AIS message	Usage	Comments
Message 1, 2, 3: Position Report Class A	Reports navigational information	This message transmits information pertaining to a ships navigation: Longitude and latitude, time, heading, speed, ships navigation status (under power, at anchor...)
Message 4: Base Station Report	Used by base stations to indicate their presence	The message reports a precise position and time. It serves as a static reference for other ships
Message 5: Static and Voyage Related Data	Gives information on a ship and its trip	One of the few messages whose data is entered by hand. This information includes static data such as a ship's length, width, draught, as well as the ship's intended destination
Message 6: Binary Addressed Message	An addressed point-to-point message with unspecified binary payload.	
Message 7: Binary Acknowledge Message	Sent to acknowledge the reception of a message 6	
Message 8: Binary Broadcast Message	A broadcast message with unspecified binary payload.	
Message 9: Standard Search and Rescue Aircraft Position Report	Used by an aircraft (helicopter or airplane) which is involved with search and rescue operation on the sea (i.e. search for and recovery of survivors of an accident at sea).	Sends out location (including altitude) and time information
Message 10: UTC/Date Inquiry	Obtain time and date from a base station	Request for UTC/Date information from an AIS base station. Used when a device does not have time and date locally, usually from GPS
Message 11: Coordinated universal time/date response	Response from message 10	Identical to message 4.
Message 12: Addressed Safety-Related Message	Used to send text messages to a specified vessel	Text message may be in plain English, commercial codes or even encrypted
Message 13: Safety related acknowledge	Response from message 12	
Message 14: Safety related broadcast message	Identical to message 12, but broadcast	
Message 15: Interrogation	Used by a base station to get the status of up to 2 other AIS devices	
Message 16: Assigned mode command	Used by a base station to manage the AIS slots	
Message 17: Global navigation-satellite system broadcast binary message	Used by a base station to broadcast differential corrections for GPS	
Message 18: Standard class B equipment position report	A less detailed report than types 1-3 for vessels using Class B transmitters	Does not include navigation status nor rate of turn
Message 19: Extended class B equipment position report	For legacy class B equipment	Is replaced by message 18
Message 20: Data link management message	Used by a base station to manage the AIS slots	This message is used to pre-allocate TDMA slots within an AIS base station network
Message 21: Aids-to-navigation report	Used by an (AtN) aid to navigation device (buoys, lighthouse..)	Transmits precise time and location as well as the characteristics of the AtN
Message 22: Channel management	Used by a base station to manage the VHF link	
Message 23: Group assignment command	Used by a base station to manage other AIS stations	
Message 24: Static data report	Equivalent of a Type 5 message for ships using Class B equipment	
Message 25: Single slot binary message	Used to transmit binary data from one device to another	
Message 26: Multiple slot binary message with communications state	Used to transmit binary data from one device to another	
Message 27: Long-range automatic identification system broadcast message	This message is used for long-range detection of AIS Class A and Class B vessels (typically by satellite).	Same as messages 1, 2 and 3

=== Messages sent to other equipment in the ship ===
AIS equipment exchange information with other equipment using NMEA 0183 sentences.

The NMEA 0183 standard uses two primary sentences for AIS data

- !AIVDM (received data from other vessels)
- !AIVDO (own vessel's information)

Typical NMEA 0183 standard AIS message: !AIVDM,1,1,,A,14eG;o@034o8sd<L9i:a;WF>062D,0*7D

In order:

!AIVDM:        The NMEA message type, other NMEA device messages are restricted  
1              Number of sentences (some messages need more than one, maximum generally is 9) 
1              Sentence number (1 unless it is a multi-sentence message) 
               The blank is the sequential message ID (for multi-sentence messages) 
A              The AIS channel (A or B), for dual channel transponders it must match the channel used 
14eG;...       The encoded AIS data, using AIS-ASCII6 
0*             End of data, number of unused bits at end of encoded data (0-5)
7D             NMEA checksum (NMEA 0183 Standard CRC16)

== Security ==
AIS use is mandated for class-A vessels and widely used by class-B vessels, so it must be transmitted in an open-source system on marine designated radio channels. In particular, on the VHF maritime mobile band, which is designated by the International Telecommunication Union as spanning 156 and 174 MHz. Data exchange at open radio frequencies renders the AIS services vulnerable to malicious transmissions, including spoofing, hijacking, and availability disruption.

These threats affect both the implementation in online providers and the protocol specification, which make the problems relevant to all transponder installations (estimated at 300,000+).

Publicly available ship monitoring websites rely on largely unauthenticated data feeds from volunteer-operated AIS receiver network, whose messages can be trivially faked by means of injecting AIS packets into the raw data stream, or on-air using slightly more complex equipment such as a GMSK modem or a Software-defined radio. AIS transponders may only allow the broadcast of the actual position from an integrated GPS receiver and a layman could not just send anything with them. But from a security perspective, arbitrary AIS message generation by modem or GPS spoofing do not require great sophistication to build and an AIS spoofer would be just as easy to use as a licensed transponder.

The AIS services include government-managed base stations that operate Vessel Traffic Systems (VTS) and coastal surveillance coverage. AIS is vulnerable to attacks that overloads time slots by sending false AIS signals or generating false distress signals. Ships experiencing congestion of their on-board AIS-calibrated equipment may use alternative aid to navigation devices (AtoNs), that determine the position of the ship and the safety of its course. However, virtual AtoNs are more susceptible to spoofing than physical AtoNs. Actors have interfered with AIS transmissions by jamming, spoofing, or meaconing.

=== Jamming ===
Jammers are low powered devices that transmit GPS signals in the same frequencies as other GPS or AIS signals to interrupt or hide the transmission in the same frequency. In October 2022, a jamming attack near Denmark's Great Belt Bridge (Danish: Storebæltsbroen) interrupted ship transmissions for 10 minutes. A total of nine ships within a 50 by 30 km range were affected and unable to transmit AIS or GPS signals. The affected ships included four cargo ships, two ferries, and the “Nymfen P524”, a Danish patrol vessel that was at that moment escorting two Russian warships, “Stoikiy 545” and “Soobrazitelny 531”.

=== Spoofing ===
The practice of AIS spoofing, also known in the shipping industry as first-party spoofing, involves the transmission of AIS signals containing falsified information, particularly regarding the transmitting vessel's location. It is distinct from GNSS spoofing attacks, also known as GPS spoofing, in which AIS transmitters broadcast false location information against the will of the vessel's crew, due to being remotely fed incorrect location information by a third party who impersonates global positioning satellites.

==== Military ====
AIS spoofing has been observed to be used in naval exercises. In December 2019, an AIS “bursting” incident near the island of Elba generated thousands of fake AIS signals from Dutch-flagged naval ships that appeared over the course of 24 minutes divided into three intervals; three minutes for the first attack, 4 minutes for the second attack; and only a few seconds for the third. AIS systems can alleviate congestion by reducing the distance of received transmissions. However, this congestion was not immediately resolved, as all of the fake signals were generated within a radius of 11NM. A 2021 study by Androjna, et al. attributes the spoofing to a naval electronic warfare exercise given that the jitter error and RSSI levels of the spoofed messages matched those of real warships.

On 18 June 2021 AIS receivers in Chornomorsk, Ukraine, reported HMS Defender and HNLMS Evertsen allegedly sailing towards Sevastopol Russian military base in annexed Crimea while the ships were safely moored in Odesa, according to numerous live port webcam feeds and witnesses, which implied that falsified AIS data was injected into the system by an unknown party. A few days later, on 22–23 June, the ships left Odesa and indeed sailed by the Crimean coast, with Russia accusing the fleet of violating its territory while UK command insisted the ships sailed in international waters.

In March 2021 a similar incident was registered by Swedish armed forces whose ships were incorrectly presented by AIS as if they were sailing in Russian waters near Kaliningrad.

In July 2021, researcher Bjorn Bergman found almost 100 sets of faked AIS data between September 2020 and August 2021, with almost all of those being faked NATO and European warships. He said that the data appeared in the system as if it had been received by ground (not satellite) receivers, which led him to believe that the data is not being introduced by fake radio transmissions, but rather injected into the data streams used by AIS websites. Todd Humphreys, director of the Radionavigation Laboratory at the University of Texas at Austin, stated that "While I can't say for sure who's doing this, the data fits a pattern of disinformation that our Russian friends are wont to engage in."

==== Blue crime ====
The use of AIS spoofing is not limited to military or political purposes. Maritime data showed more than 500 cases of ships manipulating their satellite navigation systems to hide their locations. Its use ranged from Chinese fishing fleets hiding operations in protected waters, tankers concealing stops in Iranian oil ports, container ships obfuscating journeys in the Middle East, and reportedly also weapons and drug smuggling.

Between 2008 and 2018, actors in the Southern Ocean disguised illegal fishing operations by manipulating the “Andrey Dolgov” ship's registry and transmitting up to 100 simultaneous and identical AIS signals to hide the ship's location.

==== Sanctions evasion ====
In March 2021, a United Nations Security Council investigation into sanction evasions by the Democratic People's Republic of Korea found that unflagged vessels delivered refined petroleum products to the DPRK from May 2020 to October 2020. Satellite imagery on 8 July 2020 recorded one of the investigated ships, the An Ping, delivering unreported refined petroleum at Nampo, North Korea. Between June and July 2020, over the period of delivery, the ship did not transmit AIS signals.

=== Meaconing ===
The section applies to VDE only. Meaconing devices intercept, record, and replay authentic AIS signals. Unlike with jamming devices, users can intentionally transmit at chosen frequencies and times. However, meaconing cannot spoof the transmission data, and only has capacity to replay earlier transmissions. Prerecorded signals transmitted by meaconing devices trick terminals into processing the received signal as indication that a vessel is at that very moment in the location where the signal was first recorded.

=== Countermeasures ===
Transmitters and receivers can protect ship navigation systems against AIS attacks by equipping devices with protocols that authenticate signals sent and validate signals received.

==== Cryptographic ====
Authentication protocols are those in which the message sender digitally signs messages; the message recipient verifying the signatures using a cryptographic key (normally distributed by third parties) . Papers published in 2021 noted that as cryptographic digital signatures are typically larger than the AIS messages they sign, it would be impractical to carry digital signatures within AIS channels, instead recommending signatures are carried in adjacent maritime VDE channels; further noting that subsiquent VDE channel loading would be heavy but manageable.
In 2025 the International Organization for Marine Aids to Navigation (IALA) published guidelines on cryptographic authentication for AIS and VDES, using a digital signature carried in an separate maritime VDE channel; further incorporating a timestamp to prevent meaconing as well as message spoofing. This technique is fully backwards compatable with the mariners existing use of AIS. The General Lighthouse Authorities of the UK and Ireland have used the technique to provide authentication of AIS Aid-to-Navigation (Message 21) broadcasts.
Channel loading using this technique remains heavy, and further developments may also use the Timed Efficient Stream Loss-Tolerant Authentication (TESLA) protocol. This protocol decrypts transmissions through secret keys that are sent only after the encrypted message has been detected by the system. TESLA chains are formed when each message decrypts the previous one and decrypts the next one. Long chains are inefficient; however, they are highly protected against spoofing as actors would need access to all former messages in the chain.
Encryption of AIS messages protect information by ensuring that confidential information reaches the intended target if the latter has a unique decryption key. This has a disadvantage as encryption of AIS messages (that are intended for safe navigation) may prevent legitimate users without the correct decryption key from reading them. Alternatively, transmissions can also hide information (a “watermark”) that verifies the sender’s identity. These measure ensure that actors cannot impersonate authentic signals if they do not have these secret codes or information.

==== Non-cryptographic ====
Signal- and state-analysis techniques
Receivers monitor signal time stamps to check their plausibility. For example, a receiver may flag as suspicious a boat that reaches a certain point faster than plausible given the receiver and transmitter positions, as well as delay, frequency, and other data points provided in transmitted signals. Systems may employ one or both types of receivers to filter inputs and defend against spoofing or meaconing attacks. They cannot protect against jamming attacks considering there are no signals to measure and compare against each other if transmissions are stifled. Systems equipped with snapshot receivers record transmissions intermittently, whereas tracking receivers continuously record specific GNSS signals. In the case of spoofing or meaconing, the latter provides an authentic counterpoint to the manipulated AIS data.

Antenna-array techniques/multi-antenna techniques
Ships equipped with multiple antennas can use spatial dimension data points to detect the direction of arrival (DOA) of signals. This technique can defend against spoofed AIS data by flagging different signals coming from the same direction.
Smart-antenna techniques can also work in unison to employ zero-forcing precoding to circumvent jamming attacks by transmitting signals in frequency channels that is inverse to the targeted frequency.

Inertial systems
Inertial systems are devices that measure a vessel position over time with motion sensors and gyroscopes. These devices estimate future positions based on velocity, acceleration, and orientation measurements. Detected anomalies that stray from the expected pattern can be flagged for closer inspection.

==== GNSS ====
AIS attack countermeasures cannot defend in the case of disruption to GNSS (or GPS) signals, in which all GNSS based systems, including AIS, will cease functioning.
Observed anti-satellite weapons testing by the United States, India, China, and Russia has demonstrated that nation state actors have the capacity to destroy satellites and imply the destruction of GNSS-based systems. In November 2021, Russia launched a ground-based missile that destroyed a retired Soviet-era satellite, Kosmos-1408, creating a cloud of high velocity space debris orbiting at the same level as the International Space station and other satellites.

== Research ==
There is a growing body of literature on methods of exploiting AIS data for safety and optimisation of seafaring, namely traffic analysis, anomaly detection, route extraction and prediction, collision detection, path planning, weather routing, atmospheric refractivity estimation and many more

== See also ==
- ADS-B, a conceptually similar system for aircraft
- AIS-SART, a handheld search and rescue system
- Automatic Packet Reporting System
- Long-range identification and tracking (ships)
- MarineTraffic, a site that utilizes AIS data
- NMEA 0183
- Sea traffic management
- Traffic collision avoidance system, (TCAS) for aircraft
