= Falcon 9 flight 10 =

- Official insignia for the flight

Falcon 9 v1.1 launch
- Launch: July 14, 2014, 15:15 UTC
- Operator: SpaceX
- Pad: Cape Canaveral SLC-40
- Payload: Orbcomm-OG2 × 6
- Outcome: Success

Components
- First stage: B1007

Falcon launches

Falcon 9 flight 10 was a Falcon 9 space launch that occurred on July 14, 2014. It was the fifth launch of the Falcon 9 v1.1 launch vehicle and carried six Orbcomm-OG2 telecommunication satellites. All six 172-kilogram-mass (379 lb) satellites were successfully deployed.

Following the first stage loft of the second stage and payload on its orbital trajectory, SpaceX conducted a successful flight test on the spent first stage that received considerable news attention. In the event, the first stage successfully decelerated from hypersonic speed in the upper atmosphere, made a successful reentry, landing burn, and deployment of its landing legs and touched down on the ocean surface. The first stage was not recovered however as the hull integrity was breached on landing or on the subsequent "tip over and body slam".

== History ==
This launch schedule was particularly problematic and was delayed several times, with success on the fourth scheduled launch attempt on July 14, 2014.

Earlier launch attempts were:

- delayed by SpaceX due to a first stage helium leak
- delayed by Orbcomm due to a potential defect in one of their satellites. On June 20 a launch attempt was scrubbed due to a fluctuation in pressure readings on the second stage.
- delayed one day by weather on June 21 when the launch window was closed due to poor weather conditions on the flight trajectory through the lower atmosphere
- the June 22 attempt was scrubbed by SpaceX to address a potential concern with the launch vehicle identified during pre-flight checks.

== Payloads ==
Payload	Operator	Function	Manufacturer	Bus type	Mass (kg)	Remarks
Orbcomm FM103	Orbcomm	Communications	Sierra Nevada	SN-100A	172 kg (379 lb)	
Orbcomm FM104	Orbcomm	Communications	Sierra Nevada	SN-100A	172 kg (379 lb)	
Orbcomm FM106	Orbcomm	Communications	Sierra Nevada	SN-100A	172 kg (379 lb)	
Orbcomm FM107	Orbcomm	Communications	Sierra Nevada	SN-100A	172 kg (379 lb)	
Orbcomm FM109	Orbcomm	Communications	Sierra Nevada	SN-100A	172 kg (379 lb)	
Orbcomm FM111	Orbcomm	Communications	Sierra Nevada	SN-100A	172 kg (379 lb)	

== Post-mission launch vehicle testing ==
In an arrangement unusual for launch vehicles, the first stage of the SpaceX Falcon 9 rocket conducted a propulsive-return over-water test after the second stage with the Orbcomm OG2 payload separated from the booster.

This was the third high-altitude post-mission test of this type, after the first test on Falcon 9 Flight 6 in September 2013, and a second test in April 2014. The April test resulted in the first successful controlled ocean soft touchdown of a liquid-rocket-engine orbital booster and included landing legs for the first time which were extended for the simulated "landing".

== See also ==
- List of Falcon 9 launches
