= AISSat-1 =

Norwegian space satellite

- Mission type: Technology
- Operator: Statsat
- COSPAR ID: 2010-035C
- SATCAT no.: 36797
- Mission duration: 3 years

Spacecraft properties
- Bus: GNB
- Manufacturer: UTIAS
- Launch mass: 6 kilograms (13 lb)

Start of mission
- Launch date: 12 July 2010, 03:52 UTC
- Rocket: PSLV C15
- Launch site: Satish Dhawan FLP
- Contractor: ISRO

Orbital parameters
- Reference system: Geocentric
- Regime: Low Earth
- Perigee altitude: 618 kilometres (384 mi)
- Apogee altitude: 635 kilometres (395 mi)
- Inclination: 98.02 degrees
- Period: 97.11 minutes
- Epoch: 25 December 2013, 12:05:42 UTC

AISSat-1 is a satellite used to receive Automatic Identification System (AIS) signals. Launched on 12 June 2010 from Satish Dhawan Space Centre as a secondary payload, AISSat-1 is in a Sun-synchronous low Earth orbit. Initially a development project, the satellite has since passed into ordinary operations. Via downlinks at Svalbard Satellite Station and at Vardø Vessel Traffic Service Centre it tracks vessels in the Norwegian Sea and Barents Sea for the Norwegian Coastal Administration, the Norwegian Coast Guard, the Norwegian Directorate of Fisheries and other public agencies.

The satellite was developed as a cooperation between the Norwegian Defence Research Establishment (FFI), the Norwegian Space Centre and the Coastal Administration. The payload was developed by Kongsberg Seatex while the University of Toronto Institute for Aerospace Studies built the bus and completed manufacture. The satellite measures 20 centimeters (7.9 in) cube and weighs 6 kilograms (13 lb). Ownership and operation passed to Statsat in 2013. The satellite has since 2014 been supplemented with AISSat-2 and from 2015 by AISSat-3.

== Background ==
The Automatic Identification System was developed as a navigational aid for shipping traffic, initially primarily as a collision avoidance system. The system became mandatory most commercial ships from 2008. AIS was designed as a terrestrial system with AIS transponders operating on the very high frequency (VHF) range. In addition to ship-to-ship tracking, AIS could be monitored by a series of coastal base stations. The idea for satellite monitoring arose later and was mostly intended for maritime surveillance and control, as well as safety monitoring.

The Norwegian Defence Research Establishment took the first steps towards AIS satellite use in 2003 paper. A main concern was the low transmitting power of AIS, typically one to twelve watts. Simultaneous transmission could also result in data packet collision and thus make all transmissions unreadable. Research later concluded that satellite monitoring of heavily trafficked areas would be near impossible, but that satellite surveying of the sparsely used Arctic waters would be effective. The AIS infrastructure in Norway was built and is operated by the Norwegian Coastal Administration in cooperation with the Norwegian Armed Forces. It was this cooperation which led to the development of the satellite AIS system.

Increased focus on the High North arose following the appointment of Stoltenberg's Second Cabinet in 2005. The AISSats are part of a larger policy to strengthen Norway's grip on the Arctic areas. Norway's exclusive economic zone (EEZ) covers sea areas around Svalbard and Jan Mayen, which in addition to the continental EEZ gives it an area of 1,878,953 square kilometers (725,468 sq mi). Eighty percent of all Arctic shipping traffic passes through Norway's EEZ.

== Development ==
Specific research into what became AISSat-1 began in 2005 as a cooperation between the Norwegian Space Centre, Norwegian Defence Research Establishment and Kongsberg Seatex. The initial research concluded that a satellite within an orbit of 1,000 kilometers (620 mi) would be able to receive AIS communication. A particular challenge during this period was the need for an antenna with sufficient length to match the wavelength, which would be difficult with a small satellite profile. As part of the development, an AIS transceiver was attached to the International Space Station to test out the receptivity of AIS signals in low Earth orbit. AISSat-1 was Norway's first non-commercial satellite.

The satellite was regarded as experimental by the involved parties. Design of the payload and AIS components was carried out by Kongsberg Seatex. The project is owned by the Norwegian Space Centre while NDRE was responsible for technical aspects. Once operational, the data was fed to the Coastal Administration.

AISSat-1 is built around the University of Toronto's Generic Nanosatellite Bus. The satellite measures 20 centimeters (7.9 in) cubed. It is solar-powered collected by thirty-six panels and stored in two batteries. There are three onboard computers, each with an ARM7 microcontroller. One operates household issues such as telemetry while one handled attitude control. The third handles payload operations. There are four ultra high frequency antennas for telemetry. Attitude is adjusted through three reaction wheels. The payload consists of a VHF antenna and an onboard computer for storing and processing of AIS data.

AISSat 1 and 2 could receive both AIS channels simultaneously. They could also receive the long range AIS3 and AIS4 channels instead, but since the satellites were in production use and the long range channels were not widely adopted, no routine monitoring of AIS3 and AIS4 was done.

== Launch ==
AISSat was a secondary payload which was launched on 12 July 2010 at 03:52 UTC from the First Launch Pad at Satish Dhawan Space Centre in India. The satellite was carried on board a Polar Satellite Launch Vehicle operated by the Indian Space Research Organisation. The main payload of the mission was the reconnaissance satellite Cartosat-2B. In addition to AISSat-1, secondary payloads were AlSat-2A, TISat-1 and StudSat.

AISSat was placed into a Sun-synchronous polar orbit with an altitude of 635 kilometers (395 mi). It received an inclination of 97.71° and a period of 97.4 minutes. UTIAS retained responsibility for launch and commissioning, after which operational responsibility was transferred to NDRE. The satellite was designed, built and launched within schedule and budget.

== Mission ==
NASA video demonstrating the advantages of the Norwegian AIS satellite program

AISSat-1 was built as an experimental satellite to investigate the feasibility of collecting AIS data from space. The satellite quickly proved to meet its expectations and has since been regarded as an operational satellite. Telemetry including data download is handled from Svalbard Satellite Station. From 2015 a second ground station, at Vardø Vessel Traffic Service Centre, was opened. Since 2013 operation of the satellite passed to Statsat.

The primary operational goal is the gathering of positioning and course information from fisheries and ship traffic within the Norwegian EEZ with the intent of environmental surveillance. The vessel data is used by the Coastal Administration and in particular Vardø Vessel Traffic Service Centre to monitor ship traffic. The data is stored and can also be used to collect accurate statistics on ship traffic in the Arctic. Unlike terrestrial data collection, the satellite information is not made publicly available. A contributing cause is that certain fishers many not want to reveal their fishing positions and could then have chosen to turn off their AIS instead.

The AIS data is used by the Norwegian Directorate of Fisheries for surveillance of the fisheries fleet to identify illegal fishing. Controls involve checking if ships rendezvous with other ships and when they dock. This information is then controlled with logs. This means of controlling has been an efficient preventative measure. Beyond use in the high north, AISSat-1 gradually sweeps above the entire globe in the course of a twenty-four hour period. This allows tracking of ship traffic in other areas under Norwegian jurisdiction around Bouvetøya and for instance data for combating piracy off Africa.

Data can also be used to identify any ship causing an oil spill. There are more than one thousand annual oil spills and illegal dumping in Norwegian waters. While observation satellites have previously been able to identify spills, the satellite AIS monitoring can normally identify the culprit and the data used as evidence. The Coast Guard, the Custom Service, the Police Service and the Armed Force can utilize the data from the data.

A build-to-print copy of the satellite, AISSat-2, was launched on 8 July 2014. It is intended to be followed by a third satellite, AISSat-3, in 2015. The added satellites are intended to provide redundancy in case of data capturing failure in one satellite.

The detection rate in the 15-day period from August 25, 2014 to September 9, 2015 was:

- AISSat-1: 52,222 unique MMSI identifiers
- AISSat-2: 52,017
- both as a mini-constellation: 55,787.

== NORAIS ==
In November 2009, the STS-129 space shuttle mission attached two antennas—an AIS VHF antenna, and a second ARISS antenna—to the Columbus module of the ISS. Both antennas were built in cooperation between ESA and the ARISS team (Amateur Radio on ISS). Inside the Columbus module, the AIS antenna was connected to 2 receivers of the COLAIS (Columbus AIS) project (part of the General Support Technology Programme GSTP). The NORAIS receiver was developed by the Norwegian Defence Research Establishment and Kongsberg Seatex. The LUXAIS receiver was developed by Luxspace and EmTronix. Both receivers had arrived onboard the Japanese HTV-1 supply ferry in September 2009. The receivers were to be operated alternately for 3 months at a time. COLAIS was planned as a 2-year technology demonstration project and was switched on on June 1, 2010 following the arrival of the German built ERNObox control and data relay computer onboard STS-132. LUXAIS was turned on only between Sep 27 and Oct 27, 2010 and failed to function. It was eventually returned to earth in 2012. The NORAIS project was a success: on a typical good day 400,000 position reports were receivable from 22,000 senders. An October 2011 report stated a total of 110 million received messages from 82,000 unique MMSI numbers. A SDR firmware update around May 2013 increased detection rate by 20%.

NORAIS was a software defined radio device and was continually improved. It had received a total of 350 million AIS messages from 142,000 unique ships during 213 weeks in operation until December 2014. In 2015 NORAIS-2, a hardware update based on Kongsberg's third generation AIS Receiver was flown to the ISS and on February 1, 2015 the new receiver was switched on. NORAIS-2 could receive on AIS1, AIS2 and the long range channels AIS3 and AIS4 simultaneously.

== AISSat-2 ==
The satellite was identical to No. 1 and was launched on July 8, 2014 onboard a Fregat. It ceased operations in October 2023 after 60,000 orbits.

== AISSat-3 ==
The satellite was similar to No. 2, but with an improved receiver. It failed to reach orbit when the Fregat/Soyuz launch vehicle failed on November 28, 2017 after liftoff from Vostochny Cosmodrome.

== AISSat-4 ==
The satellite is being prepared for a 2026 launch and differs from the previous design.

- Size: 10x20x30cm
- Weight: 6kg
- Receiver: Kongsberg Discovery ASR C-50
- Price: 15 million NOK
- Builder: Canadian Space Flight Laboratories (SFL)

== See also ==
- nCube
