= TRISHNA =

Planned joint Indo-French weather satellite

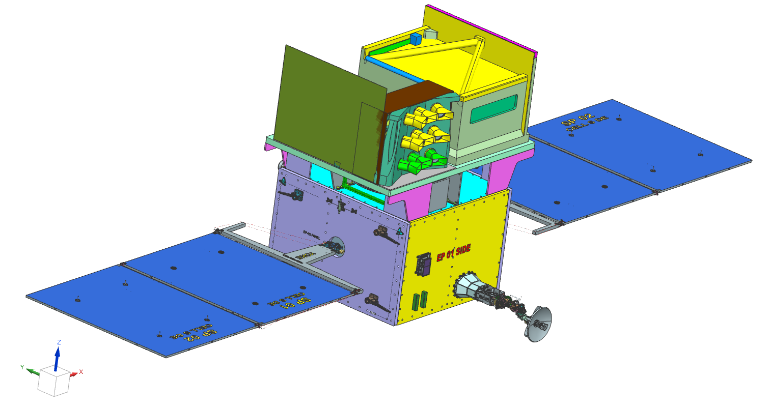
- Mission type: Weather
- Operator: ISRO/CNES
- Website: https://www.isro.gov.in/TRISHNA_Mission.html
- Mission duration: ~ 5 years with possible 2 year extension

Spacecraft properties
- Bus: IMS-1K
- Manufacturer: ISRO

Expedition
- Began: UTC

Start of mission
- Launch date: December 2027
- Rocket: Polar Satellite Launch Vehicle
- Launch site: Satish Dhawan Space Centre

Orbital parameters
- Regime: Polar sun-synchronous
- Eccentricity: 0
- Altitude: 761 km
- Inclination: ~90°
- Repeat interval: 8 days

Instruments
- VSWIR (Atmosphere, Land, Snow & Ice); TIR (Land & Ocean)

TRISHNA or (Thermal infraRed Imaging Satellite for High-resolution Natural resource Assessment) is a planned cooperative joint satellite mission between the Indian Space Research Organisation (ISRO) of India and Centre national d'études spatiales (CNES) of France.Its orbit will provide a spatial resolution of 57 meters for land and coastal areas and 1 km for oceanic and polar regions. The mission is designed for a 5-year operational life.

== Objectives ==
The scientific objectives of the mission are:

- ecosystem stress and water use (management of water resources).
- coastal and inland waters (water quality, fish resources, ice).
- urban microclimates monitoring (characterization of urban heat island).
- solid earth (thermal anomaly detection).
- cryosphere (snow and ice monitoring).
- atmosphere (water content, cloud characterization).

== History ==
The Mission was announced during bilateral talks between India and France in July 2023. On 19 March 2024, TRISHNA received approval from both space agencies and a project team has been formed to finish developing the mission concept. It is currently planned for a launch in October 2027, aboard a PSLV rocket from Satish Dhawan Space Centre. This marks the next collaboration in space between India and France following the Megha-Tropiques and SARAL satellites.By 2026, The Preliminary Design Review for the bus elements and the VNIR and SWIR payloads were completed. Development of the spacecraft was reported to be progressing well as of september 2026.

The mission, named after the Sanskrit word for Thirst, aims to conduct a deep analysis of the global water cycle and climate change. The mission aims to observe t in thermal infrared wavelengths and monitor local surface temperatures, vegetation stress, water availability, evapotranspiration in plants as a part of its mission package.

== Instruments ==
Trishna aims to have a resolution of approximately 57 metres and a re-visit interval of about three days. It would have two instruments, namely Visible and Near Infrared (VNIR)/Short Wave InfraRed (SWIR) sensor (VSWIR) that wil be built by ISRO and Thermal InfraRed instrument (TIR) built by CNES. CNES will deliver TIR to ISRO in 2026.

== See also ==
- Megha-Tropiques
- SARAL
