= Vardø Radio =

Coast radio station in Norway

Coordinates: 70.370°N 31.098°E

Map of coverage area

Vardø Radio is a coast radio station based in the town of Vardø in Vardø Municipality in Finnmark county, Norway. Operated by Telenor Maritim Radio, it is responsible monitoring distress calls and relaying communication along the Barents Sea coast between Tromsø and the Norway–Russia border. It was established in 1923 and is jointly located with Vardø Vessel Traffic Service Centre.
