= VesselSat-2 =

- Mission type: Ship tracking
- Operator: LuxSpace (lessor); Orbcomm (operator)
- COSPAR ID: 2012-001B
- SATCAT no.: 38047
- Mission duration: Planned: 3 years Achieved: 4 years

Spacecraft properties
- Manufacturer: LuxSpace
- Launch mass: 29 kilograms (64 lb)

Start of mission
- Launch date: 9 January 2012, 03:17 UTC
- Rocket: Chang Zheng 4B Y26
- Launch site: Taiyuan LC-9

End of mission
- Last contact: January 2016

Orbital parameters
- Reference system: Geocentric
- Regime: Low Earth
- Perigee altitude: 472 kilometres (293 mi)
- Apogee altitude: 484 kilometres (301 mi)
- Inclination: 97.43 degrees
- Period: 94.02 minutes
- Epoch: 31 October 2013, 18:34:19 UTC

VesselSat-2 (a.k.a. Orbcomm FM43, V2) was a Luxembourgian microsatellite built and owned by LuxSpace, and operated by Orbcomm under lease. It carried a receiver for Automatic Identification System signals, used to track ships at sea. VesselSat-2 was the second of two VesselSat spacecraft (see VesselSat-1), which were built by LuxSpace for Orbcomm, as replacements for the AIS capabilities of the failed Orbcomm-QL spacecraft.

VesselSat-2 was launched as a secondary payload on a Long March 4B carrier rocket which was carrying Ziyuan 3. The launch occurred at 03:17 UTC on 9 January 2012, from Launch Complex 9 at the Taiyuan Satellite Launch Centre, and was the first orbital launch of the year.
