= AIS station =

AIS receiver stations receive telegrams from near by vessels via VHF data (about 162 MHz) and sending it to Automatic identification system to be recorded and used for vessel tracking and other purpose.

== See also ==
- GPS Exchange Format

Related standards

- NMEA 0183
- NMEA 2000
- NMEA OneNet, a future standard based on Ethernet
