= Vardø Vessel Traffic Service Centre =

Vardø Vessel Traffic Service Centre (Norwegian: Vardø trafikksentral; call sign: NOR VTS), also known as Norwegian Oceanic Region Vessel Traffic Service, is a vessel traffic service situated in the town of Vardø in Vardø Municipality in Finnmark county, Norway. It is responsible for monitoring ship traffic off the baseline of Norway throughout the exclusive economic zone (EEZ), including the areas around Jan Mayen and Svalbard. It has special responsibilities for the sealanes into Hammerfest and Sveagruva.

Proposals for a northerly VTS arose around 2000 and the plans approved in 2003. The station became operational on 1 January 2007 and was jointly located with Vardø Radio. It was issued the task of a new traffic separation scheme and the emergency tugboat service. Since 2010 NOR VTS has been able to monitor a larger area with through the AISSat satellite constellation, ultimately resulting in a ground station being built at Vardø. Since 2010 NOR VTS has coordinated Navarea XIX.

== History ==
The background for establishing the center was the need to monitor offshore oil tanker traffic, mostly Russian, which runs along the coast of Norway. Russia and Norway cooperated in planning and training for oil spills in the Barents Sea since 1994. Proposals for a VTS covering the Norwegian and Barents Sea were around the turn of the millennium, initially intended to cover Northern Norway. The Coastal Administration proposed several possible locations as suitable, such as Honningsvåg, Lødingen, Reitan in Bodø Municipality, Tromsø and Vardø. Arguments for locating it in Vardø was the possibility for co-locating it with Vardø Radio. Lødingen and Honningsvåg were proposed due to them hosting regional offices of the Coastal Administration.

Another dimension of the discussion was whether the facility should be military or civilian. In case of a military operation, it would undoubtedly have been placed at Reitan, the site of the Norwegian Joint Headquarters. The Coastal Administration argued that operations should be civilian, stating that it was not suitable for the military to be conducting surveillance of civilian traffic. A report ordered by the Ministry of Fisheries and Coastal Affairs concluded that Honningsvåg was the most suitable site. The report emphasized the town's strong maritime competence due to the Coastal Administration's regional offices being located there. Minister Svein Ludvigsen turned around the decision. He emphasized the "strategic" location and that it would have a rural-political impact. Construction was budgeted at 134 million Norwegian krone.

The facility became operational on 1 January 2007, and was officially opened on 23 January. Initially the VTS was given jurisdiction over the ocean south to Rørvik. The center received two employees. From 1 July a traffic separation scheme (TTS) was introduced along the coast from Vardø to Røst, with NOR VTS set to monitor the traffic. Approved by the International Maritime Organization (IMO), the TTS forced tankers exceeding 5,000 gross tons to follow a stipulated, separated route typically 80 to 50 kilometers (43 to 27 nmi) from the shore. NOR VTS was also given the responsibility for the State Emergency Tow Response Service, a joint effort between the Coastal Administration and the Coast Guard.

IMO and the International Hydrographic Organization expanded the Navareas in 2010 to also include polar waters. Norway and hence NOR VTS was given the responsibility for coordination within Navarea XIX. An analysis division was established in conjunction with the VTS in 2014.

Initially NOR VTS only had access to AIS data from coastal stations. This changed in 2010 when AISSat-1 was launched. Built as a demonstration project, it quickly proved reliable to monitor the high sees within NOR VTS's area of responsibility. Initially telemetry operated out of Svalbard Satellite Station, but in 2015 a ground station opened in Vardø next to the VTS, allowing for a greater period of online operations. The give the constellation redundancy, AISSat-2 was launched in 2014 and AISSat-3 the following year.

== Operations ==
NOR VTS is responsible for vessel traffic services within the Norwegian exclusive economic zone, including the fisheries protection zones around Svalbard and Jan Mayen, but excluding the EEZ around Bouvetøya. It also does not include areas within the baseline of continental Norway, but it does include the territorial waters outside these. In addition, NOR VTS manages the sealanes into Hammerfest and in Bellsundet. NOR VTS registered 240,000 sailings in 2014, of which 47,000 were classified as risk sailings due to potentially hazardous or polluting cargo.

The main task is monitoring all ship traffic along in the mandated zone with the goal of detecting irregularities. A primary goal is to avoid accidents through communication with relevant ships and taking necessary actions. NOR VTS is responsible for dispatching the five tugboats which make up the State Emergency Tow Response Service. It is also responsible for issuing extreme weather warnings, as well as coordinating messages in Navarea XIX. This covers the waters between Greenland and the Norway–Russia border north of the 65th parallel north. NOR VTS also records statistics on traffic, including single-hull tankers. The VTS retains information exchange with Iceland and a mutual notification of acute pollution with Russia. The center is staffed around the clock.

Monitoring is carried out through the domestic, terrestrial AIS chain, which is supplemented with the AISSat constellation which allows for monitoring of Arctic high sea areas. NOR VTS also receives AIS data from Russia. Monitoring is also carried out via the coast radio station network operated by Telenor Maritim Radio and the radar chain operated by the Norwegian Armed Forces. Information is also gathered from the SafeSeaNet reporting system and long-range identification and tracking.

The primary operational goal of satellite AIS is the gathering of positioning and course information from fisheries and ship traffic within the Norwegian EEZ with the intent of environmental surveillance. The vessel data is used by the Coastal Administration and in particular Vardø Vessel Traffic Service Centre to monitor ship traffic. The data is stored and can also be used to collect accurate statistics on ship traffic in the Arctic. Unlike terrestrial data collection, the satellite information is not made publicly available. A contributing cause is that certain fishers many not want to reveal their fishing positions and could then have chosen to turn off their AIS instead. Data can also be used to identify any ship causing an oil spill. There are more than one thousand annual oil spills and illegal dumping in Norwegian waters. While observation satellites have previously been able to identify spills, the satellite AIS monitoring can normally identify the culprit and the data used as evidence.
