= Inthinc =

inthinc Technology Solutions, Inc.
- Type: Private
- Industry: Telematics
- Founded: 1997
- Headquarters: Salt Lake City
- Key people: Todd W. Follmer, CEO
- Website: www.inthinc.com

Inthinc Technology Solutions, Inc., typically stylized as inthinc, is a telematics service provider, headquartered in Salt Lake City, Utah, centered on driver safety, fleet management and compliance. inthinc Technology is designed to help companies with fleet vehicles save money by reducing driver accidents, avoid federal and state penalties and conserve fuel. Customers include Boart Longyear, Cintas, Barrick Gold and McCall Services. The company was acquired in 2017 by Orbcomm.
