= Orbcomm =

American wireless networking and telecommunications company

ORBCOMM Inc.
- Type: Private
- Traded as: Nasdaq: ORBC (2006–2021)
- Industry: Wireless data networking
- Founded: 1993; 33 years ago by Orbital Sciences and Teleglobe
- Headquarters: Sterling, Virginia, US
- Key people: Sameer Agrawal (CEO); Christian Mezger (CFO); Udaya Shrivastava (CTO)
- Products: Industrial Internet, telecommunications and informatics, and satellite communications
- Revenue: ▼US$248 million (2020)
- Owner: GI Partners (2021–present)
- Number of employees: 800
- Website: orbcomm.com

ORBCOMM Inc. is an American company that offers industrial IoT products designed to track, monitor, and control fixed and mobile assets in markets including transportation, heavy equipment, maritime, oil and gas, utilities and government. The company provides hardware devices, modems, web applications, and data services delivered over multiple satellites and cellular networks.

As of June 30, 2021, Orbcomm has more than 2.3 million billable subscriber communicators, serving original equipment manufacturers (OEMs) such as Caterpillar Inc., Doosan Infracore America, Hitachi Construction Machinery Co., Ltd., John Deere, Komatsu Limited, and Volvo Construction Equipment, as well as other customers such as J. B. Hunt, C&S Wholesale Grocers, Canadian National Railways, C.R. England, Hub Group, KLLM Transport Services, Marten Transport, Swift Transportation, Target, Tropicana, Tyson Foods, Walmart and Werner Enterprises.

Orbcomm owns and operates a global network of 31 low Earth orbit (LEO) communications satellite and accompanying ground infrastructure, including 16 gateway Earth stations (GESs) around the world. Orbcomm is licensed to provide service in more than 130 countries and territories worldwide.

== History ==
The Orbcomm low Earth orbit (LEO) system was conceived by Orbital Sciences Corporation (Orbital) in the late 1980s. In 1990, Orbital filed the world's first license application with the Federal Communications Commission (FCC) for the operation of a network of small LEO spacecraft to provide global satellite services of commercial messaging and data communications services via the company's Orbcomm program.

During the initial stages of the program, Orbital pursued a multi-pronged approach: regulatory approvals, ground infrastructure development and procurement of sites, modem development, and country licensing. In 1992, the World Administrative Radio Conference (WARC) supported the spectrum allocation for non-voice, non-geostationary mobile-satellite service. With WARC approval, Orbital set up a specific Orbcomm program to develop satellites and ground infrastructure, and Orbcomm became a wholly owned subsidiary of Orbital. In 1995, Orbcomm was granted a full license to operate a network with up to 200,000 mobile Earth stations (MESs).

Orbcomm began procuring gateway Earth station (GES) locations and contracted with a division of Orbital Sciences, located in Mesa, Arizona, to develop and build four sets of GESs and associated spares. Land for the four GESs was procured or leased in Arizona, Washington, New York, and Georgia.

After the 1992 WARC approval, Orbcomm signed contracts with three modem developers and manufacturers: Kyushu Matsushita Electric Company, a division of Panasonic; Elisra Electronic Systems, an Israeli company with expertise in electronic warfare systems; and Torrey Science & Technology, a small San Diego–based company with long ties to Orbital Sciences. Panasonic provided the first Orbcomm-approved MES in March 1995. Elisra followed with the EL2000 in late 1995, and Torrey Science provided the ComCore 200 in April 1996.

During equipment development, Orbcomm also pursued licensing and regulatory approvals in several countries. By 1995, Orbcomm had obtained regulatory approval in 19 countries, with several additional countries well into the regulatory process. Orbcomm was also in initial negotiations with groups in Indonesia, EMEA and Italy for becoming Orbcomm licensees and GES operators in their respective regions.

During the conceptual stages of the LEO satellite communications system, Orbital Sciences purchased a small company in Boulder, Colorado, specializing in small-satellite design. This company built the first three satellites in the Orbcomm system: Orbcomm X, Communications Demonstration Satellite (CDS) 1, and CDS 2. Orbcomm X was lost after a single orbit. To validate the feasibility of commercially tracking and communicating with an LEO satellite, Orbital built an additional communications payload and flew this payload on an SR-71 in 1992. These tests were successful, and work on CDS 1 and 2 continued. CDS 1 and CDS 2 were launched in February and April 1992, respectively. These satellites were used to validate the design of the network further and were showcased in Orbital's plans to sign up an equity partner for the completion of the Orbcomm System.

In June 1992, Orbital created an equal partnership called Orbcomm Global L.P. with Teleglobe Mobile Partners (Teleglobe Mobile), an affiliate of Teleglobe Inc., for the design and development of the LEO satellite system. Teleglobe Mobile invested $85 million in the project and provided international service distribution. Orbital agreed to construct and launch satellites for the Orbcomm system and to construct the satellite control center, the network control center, and four U.S. gateway Earth stations.

Two satellites (F Plane) were launched in April 1995, and the Orbcomm global mobile data communications network was tested in the summer. Teleglobe Mobile invested an additional $75 million in the project that year and joined Orbital as a full joint-venture partner in Orbcomm. In February 1996, Orbcomm initiated the world's first commercial service for global mobile data communications provided by LEO satellites. Orbcomm also raised an additional $170 million. In October 1996, Orbcomm licensed Malaysian partner Technology Resources Industries Bhd. (TRI) to sell Orbcomm's global two-way messaging service in Singapore, Malaysia, and Brunei. TRI became the owner of a 15% stake in ORBCOMM, Teleglobe owning 35%, and the rest held by Orbital.

In December 1997, Orbcomm launched eight satellites (A Plane). In 1998 Orbcomm launched two satellites (G Plane) in February, eight satellites (B Plane) in August, and eight satellites (C Plane) in September. After a short hiatus, Orbcomm launched seven more satellites (D Plane) in December 1999.

With the launch and operation of the C Plane satellites, Orbcomm became the first commercial provider of global LEO satellite data and messaging communications services. Orbcomm inaugurated full commercial service with its satellite-based global data communications network on November 30, 1998. In March 1998, the FCC expanded Orbcomm's original license from 36 to 48 satellites.

In January 2000, Orbital halted funding of Orbcomm, and Teleglobe and Orbital signed a new partnership agreement with 67% ownership to Teleglobe and 33% to Orbital. In May 2000, Teleglobe ceased funding ORBCOMM. Like its voice-centric competitors Iridium and Globalstar, it filed for Chapter 11 protection, in September 2000.

=== New ownership ===
In 2001, a group of private investors purchased Orbcomm and its assets out of an auction process, and Orbcomm LLC was organized on April 4, 2001. On April 23, 2001, this group of investors acquired substantially all of the non-cash assets of Orbcomm Global L.P. and its subsidiaries, which included the in-orbit satellites and supporting U.S. ground infrastructure equipment that the company owns today. At the same time, Orbcomm LLC also acquired the FCC licenses required to own and operate the communications system from a subsidiary of Orbital Sciences Corporation, which was not in bankruptcy, in a related transaction. Orbcomm issued a public offering of stock in November 2006. The company sold 9.2 million shares of common stock.

In September 2007, Orbcomm Inc. was sued for its IPO prospectus containing inaccurate statements of material fact. It failed to disclose that demand for the company's products was weakening. In 2009, a payment of $2,450,000 was agreed upon.

In September 2009, Orbcomm signed a contract with SpaceX to launch Orbcomm's next-generation OG2 satellite constellation.

Orbcomm launched its commercial satellite Automatic Identification System (AIS) service in 2009. AIS technology is used mainly for collision avoidance and maritime domain awareness, search and rescue, and environmental monitoring. Orbcomm leased the capabilities of two additional satellites, VesselSat-1 and VesselSat-2, launched in October 2011 and January 2012, respectively, for its AIS service from Luxspace.

On July 14, 2014, Orbcomm launched six next-generation OG2 satellites aboard a SpaceX Falcon 9 rocket from Cape Canaveral Air Force Station, Florida.

In December 2015, the company launched eleven OG2 satellites from Cape Canaveral Air Force Station in Florida with the launch of the SpaceX Falcon 9 rocket. This dedicated launch marked Orbcomm's second and final OG2 mission to complete its next-generation satellite constellation.

In September 2021, the company announced the completion of its acquisition by GI Partners in an all-cash transaction that values Orbcomm at approximately $1.1 billion, including net debt. As a result, Orbcomm is a privately held company, and its common stock is no longer listed on the Nasdaq stock market.

=== Acquisitions ===
Since 2011, Orbcomm has acquired several companies including:

- StarTrak Systems
- PAR Logistics Management Systems
- MobileNet
- GlobalTrak
- SENS Asset Tracking
- Euroscan
- InSync Software
- SkyWave Mobile Communications
- WAM Technologies
- Skygistics
- Inthinc
- Blue Tree Systems

After the acquisition of companies such as SkyWave, some of Orbcomm branded product offerings are based on Inmarsat's geostationary satellites instead of Orbcomm's own LEO satellites.

== Satellites ==
The first-generation OG1 satellites each weigh 42 kg (93 lb). Two disc-shaped solar panels articulate in 1-axis to track the sun and provide 160 watts of power. Communication with subscriber units is done using SDPSK modulation at 4800 bit/s for the downlink and 2400 bit/s for the uplink.

Each satellite has a 56 kbit/s backhaul that utilizes the popular TDMA multiplexing scheme and QPSK modulation. Orbcomm is the only current satellite licensee operating in the 137-150 MHz VHF band, which was allocated globally for "Little LEO" systems. Several such systems were planned in the early to mid-1990s, but Orbcomm was the only one to launch successfully. In the continental United States, Orbcomm statistically relays 90% of the text messages within six minutes, but gaps between satellites can result in message delivery times of 15 minutes or more. Orbcomm reported during an earnings report call in early 2007 that 50% of subscriber-initiated reports (messages of six bytes in size) were received in less than one minute, 90% in less than 4 minutes, and 98% in less than 15 minutes. With the current constellation of Orbcomm satellites, there is likely to be a satellite within range of almost any spot on Earth at any time of the day or night. Every satellite has an onboard GPS receiver for positioning. Typical data payloads are 6 bytes to 30 bytes, adequate for sending GPS position data or simple sensor readings.

Orbcomm Global launched 35 satellites in the mid to late 1990s. Of the original 35, 24 remain operational today, according to company filings. The plane F polar satellite, one of the original prototype first-generation satellites launched in 1995, was retired in April 2007 due to intermittent service. Two additional satellites (one from each of Plane B and Plane D) were retired in 2008 also due to intermittent service. The other five satellites that are not operational experienced failures earlier. The absence of these eight satellites can increase system latency and decrease overall capacity. Orbcomm has invested in replacement satellites as the first generation is at or nearing the end of life.

On June 19, 2008, six additional Orbcomm satellites were launched with the Cosmos-3M rocket: one Orbcomm CDS weighing 80 kg, and five Orbcomm Quick Launches weighing 115 kg each. These new satellites were built by German OHB System AG (platform) and by Orbital Sciences Corporation (payload) and included a secondary AIS. Design and production of the satellite platform was subcontracted by OHB System to Russian KB Polyot.

On November 9, 2009, Orbcomm filed a report to the US Securities and Exchange Commission stating that since its launch, communications capability for three of the quick-launch satellites and the CDS has been lost. The failed satellites experienced attitude control system anomalies as well as anomalies with its power systems, which resulted in the satellites not pointing towards the sun and the earth as expected and as a consequence has reduced power generation. The company filed a $50 million claim with its insurers covering the loss of all six satellites and received $44.5 million in compensation.

=== OG2 ===
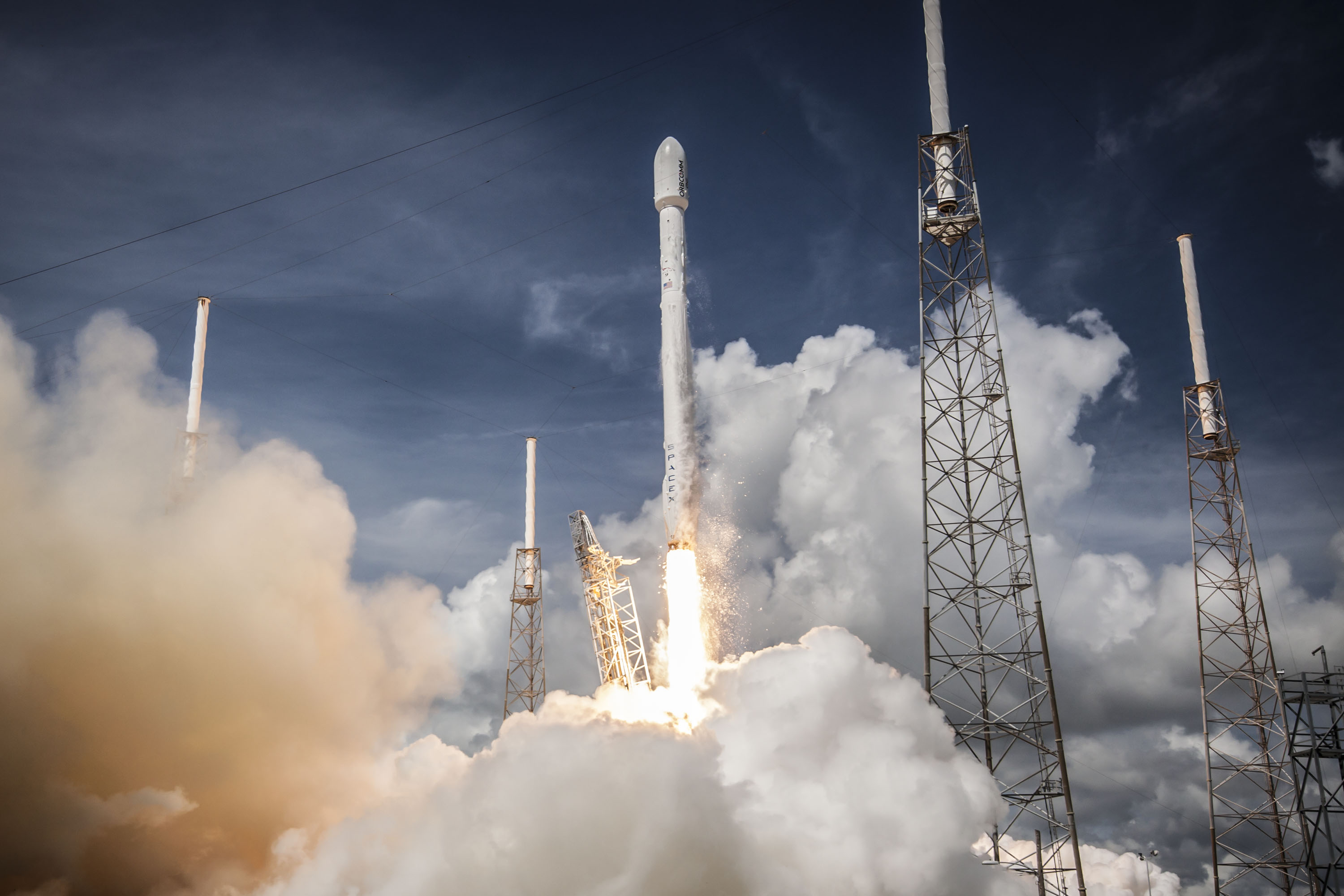
SpaceX's Falcon 9 v1.1 rocket launched the Orbcomm OG2 Mission 1 on July 14, 2014.

On September 3, 2009, a deal was announced between Orbcomm and Space Exploration Technologies (SpaceX) to launch 18 second-generation satellites with SpaceX launch vehicles between 2010 and 2014. SpaceX originally planned to use Falcon 1e rocket, but on March 14, 2011, it was announced that SpaceX would use Falcon 9 to carry the first two Orbcomm next-generation OG2 satellites to orbit in 2011. On October 7, 2012, the first SpaceX Falcon 9 launch of a prototype OG2 Orbcomm communications satellite from Cape Canaveral failed to achieve the proper orbit, and the company filed a $10 million claim with its insurers. The Orbcomm satellite was declared a total loss and burned up in the atmosphere upon reentry on October 10, 2012.

On July 14, 2014, Orbcomm launched six next-generation OG2 satellites aboard a SpaceX Falcon 9 rocket from Cape Canaveral Air Force Station, Florida. In September 2014, Orbcomm announced that, after in-orbit testing, the six satellites had been properly spaced within their orbital planes and were processing over 20% of the network's M2M traffic. In June 2015, the company lost communication with one of the in-orbit OG2 satellites. The company recorded an impairment charge of $12.7 million to write off the net book value of this satellite as of June 30, 2015. The company stated that the loss of this one satellite is not expected to have a material adverse effect on network communications services.

In October 2015, the company announced that SpaceX plans to launch eleven OG2 satellites from Cape Canaveral Air Force Station in Florida on the next launch of the SpaceX Falcon 9 rocket. The satellites were deployed on December 21, 2015. This dedicated launch marked ORBCOMM's second and final OG2 mission to complete its next-generation satellite constellation.

Compared to its current OG1 satellites, Orbcomm 's OG2 satellites are designed for faster message delivery, larger message sizes, and better coverage at higher latitudes, while increasing network capacity. In addition, the OG2 satellites are equipped with an Automatic Identification System (AIS) payload to receive and report transmissions from AIS-equipped vessels for ship tracking and other maritime navigational and safety efforts.

Frequency range	Downlink	137–138 MHz
Frequency range	Uplink	148–150.05 MHz

== Network services ==
Orbcomm provides satellite data services. As of May 2016, Orbcomm has more than 1.6 million billable subscriber communicators. Orbcomm has control centers in the United States, Brazil, Japan, and South Korea, as well as U.S. ground stations in New York, Georgia, Arizona, Washington and international ground stations in Curaçao, Italy, Australia, Kazakhstan, Brazil, Argentina, Morocco, Japan, South Korea, and Malaysia. Plans for additional ground station locations are underway.

The Orbcomm satellite network best suits users who send small amounts of data. To avoid interference, terminals are not permitted to be active more than 1% of the time, and thus they may only execute a 450 ms data burst twice every fifteen minutes. The latency inherent in Orbcomm's network design prevents it from supporting certain safety-critical applications.

Orbcomm's acquisition of SkyWave Mobile Communications in January 2015 gave the company access to higher bandwidth, lower-latency satellite products, and services that leverage IsatData Pro (IDP) technology over Inmarsat's global L-band satellite network.

ORBCOMM's direct competition includes Globalstar's simplex services (which Orbcomm also resells) and L-band leased capacity services such as those offered by SkyBitz. Orbcomm's most significant competitor is Iridium Communications, which offers the Iridium SBD service, which features data packet, latency, and antenna capabilities similar to that of IDP technology, which is now jointly owned by Orbcomm and Inmarsat.

Orbcomm satellite services can be easily integrated with business applications. Customer data can be retrieved or auto-forwarded via SMTP or HTTP/XML feed directly over the Internet or through a dedicated link.

Orbcomm also partners with seven different cellular providers to offer wireless connectivity, cellular airtime data plans, and SIM cards for M2M and IoT applications.

Orbcomm's other network service business is Automatic Identification System, or AIS, a widely deployed system to track ocean vessels. Six satellites with AIS capability were launched in June 2008, referred to as the Quick Launch satellites. However, all six satellites eventually failed prematurely. When Orbcomm's next-generation satellites launched on July 14, 2014, each one was equipped with an Automatic Identification System (AIS) payload to receive and report transmissions from AIS-equipped vessels for ship tracking and other maritime applications. Orbcomm combines its satellite AIS data with a variety of terrestrial feeds to track over 150,000 vessels daily for around 100 customers in a variety of government and commercial organizations.

== Military contracting ==
On December 10, 2020, US Army Contracting Command, Rock Island Arsenal, Illinois, contracted Orbcomm for transponders.

== See also ==
- Mobile-satellite service
- Satellite phone
- Globalstar
- Globalsat Group
- Gonets
- Gurtam
- ICO Global Communications
- Inmarsat
- Iridium Satellite LLC
- O3b Networks
- Solaris Mobile
- Sky and Space Global
- SkyTerra
- SkyWave Mobile Communications
- TerreStar Corporation
