= Orbcomm (satellite) =

Family of Low Earth orbit communications satellites

- Operator: Orbcomm
- Applications: Communication

Specifications
- Regime: Low Earth orbit

Orbcomm is a family of low Earth orbit communications satellites, operated by the United States satellite communications company Orbcomm. As of May 2025, 62 such satellites have orbited Earth, with 61 still continuing to do so.

== Satellite types ==
=== Orbcomm-CDS ===
Orbcomm-X
- Manufacturer: OSC
- Operator: Orbcomm
- Applications: Technology Demonstrator

Specifications
- Launch mass: 22 kg (49 lb)
- Regime: LEO

Production
- Status: Retired
- Built: 1
- Launched: 1
- Failed: 1

Related spacecraft
- Derivatives: Orbcomm-CDS 1,2

Orbcomm-CDS 1,2
- Manufacturer: OSC
- Operator: Orbcomm
- Applications: Technology Demonstrator

Specifications
- Launch mass: 13.6 kg (30 lb)
- Regime: Sun-synchronous

Production
- Status: Retired
- Built: 2
- Launched: 2
- Retired: 2

Related spacecraft
- Derived from: Orbcomm-X
- Derivatives: Orbcomm-OG1

Orbcomm-CDS 3
- Manufacturer: PO Polyot (bus); OSC (payload)
- Designer: OHB-System
- Operator: Orbcomm
- Applications: Technology Demonstrator

Specifications
- Bus: Sterkh
- Launch mass: 22 kg (49 lb)
- Regime: LEO

Production
- Status: Retired
- Built: 1
- Launched: 1
- Retired: 1

Related spacecraft
- Derivatives: Orbcomm-QL

Orbcomm-CDS (Concept or Capability Demonstration Satellites) are spacecraft which were launched to test equipment and communication techniques used by the other satellites. The first three CDS satellites, Orbcomm-X, CDS-1 and CDS-2, were launched before any operational satellites, in order to validate the systems to be used in the operational constellation.

Orbcomm-X, also known as Datacomm-X, was launched in 1991. It carried communications and GPS experiments. Initially, the spacecraft was reported healthy, but communication was lost after just one orbit.

CDS-3 was launched in 2008, along with the 5 Quick Launch satellites. It contained experiments for relaying signals from the United States Coast Guard Automatic Identification System through the satellite constellation. It was designated Orbcomm FM-29, having acquired most of the communications payload from another satellite that was never launched. The avionics bus of this unlaunched satellite was later used on the TacSat-1 satellite. TacSat-1 was never launched, either.

=== Orbcomm-OG1 ===
Orbcomm-OG1
- Manufacturer: OSC
- Country of origin: United States
- Operator: Orbcomm
- Applications: Communications fleet

Specifications
- Spacecraft type: Communications Satellite
- Bus: MicroStar
- Launch mass: 40 to 45 kg (88 to 99 lb)
- Regime: LEO, mostly 720 km × 720 km × 45°
- Design life: 4 years

Production
- Status: Out of production
- Built: 36
- Launched: 35
- Operational: 24
- Retired: 11

Orbcomm-1 or Orbcomm-OG1 satellites make up most of the current Orbcomm constellation. 36 were built, of which 35 were launched. The unlaunched satellite, original designation Orbcomm FM-29, was first cannibalized for parts for the CDS-3 satellite and then rebuilt as TacSat-1 for the United States military.

=== Orbcomm-QL ===
Orbcomm-QL
- Manufacturer: PO Polyot (bus); OSC (payload)
- Designer: OHB-System
- Operator: Orbcomm
- Applications: Fleet replenishment

Specifications
- Spacecraft type: Communications Satellite
- Bus: Sterkh
- Launch mass: 80 kg (180 lb)
- Regime: LEO, 672 km × 661 km (418 mi × 411 mi) × 48.45°
- Design life: 8–10 years (actual achieved ~2 years)

Production
- Status: Retired
- Built: 5
- Launched: 5
- Retired: 5

Related spacecraft
- Derived from: Orbcomm-CDS 3

Orbcomm Quick Launch (Orbcomm-QL) satellites are satellites which were intended to replenish the constellation. The first five such satellites were launched in 2008, with one more planned, but never launched. The satellites are based on the CDS-3 satellite, which was launched on the same rocket as the first five QL spacecraft. The sixth will be launched as a secondary payload to a Russian Government satellite, also on a Kosmos-3M. Orbcomm holds options for two further satellites. The satellites experienced a power system anomaly, and Orbcomm filed an insurance claim on the satellites for $50 million. Orbcomm reported in 2011 that the last remaining Quick Launch satellite had failed.

=== Orbcomm-OG2 ===
Orbcomm-OG2
- Manufacturer: Sierra Nevada Corporation (prime); Argon ST (payload)
- Country of origin: United States
- Operator: Orbcomm
- Applications: Communications

Specifications
- Spacecraft type: Communications Satellite
- Bus: SN-100A
- Launch mass: 172 kg (379 lb)
- Power: 400 watts
- Equipment: Orbcomm and AIS
- Regime: Low Earth orbit, 750 km × 750 km × 45°
- Design life: 5 years (planned)

Production
- Status: Operational
- Built: 18
- Launched: 18
- Operational: 12
- Retired: 5
- Failed: 1

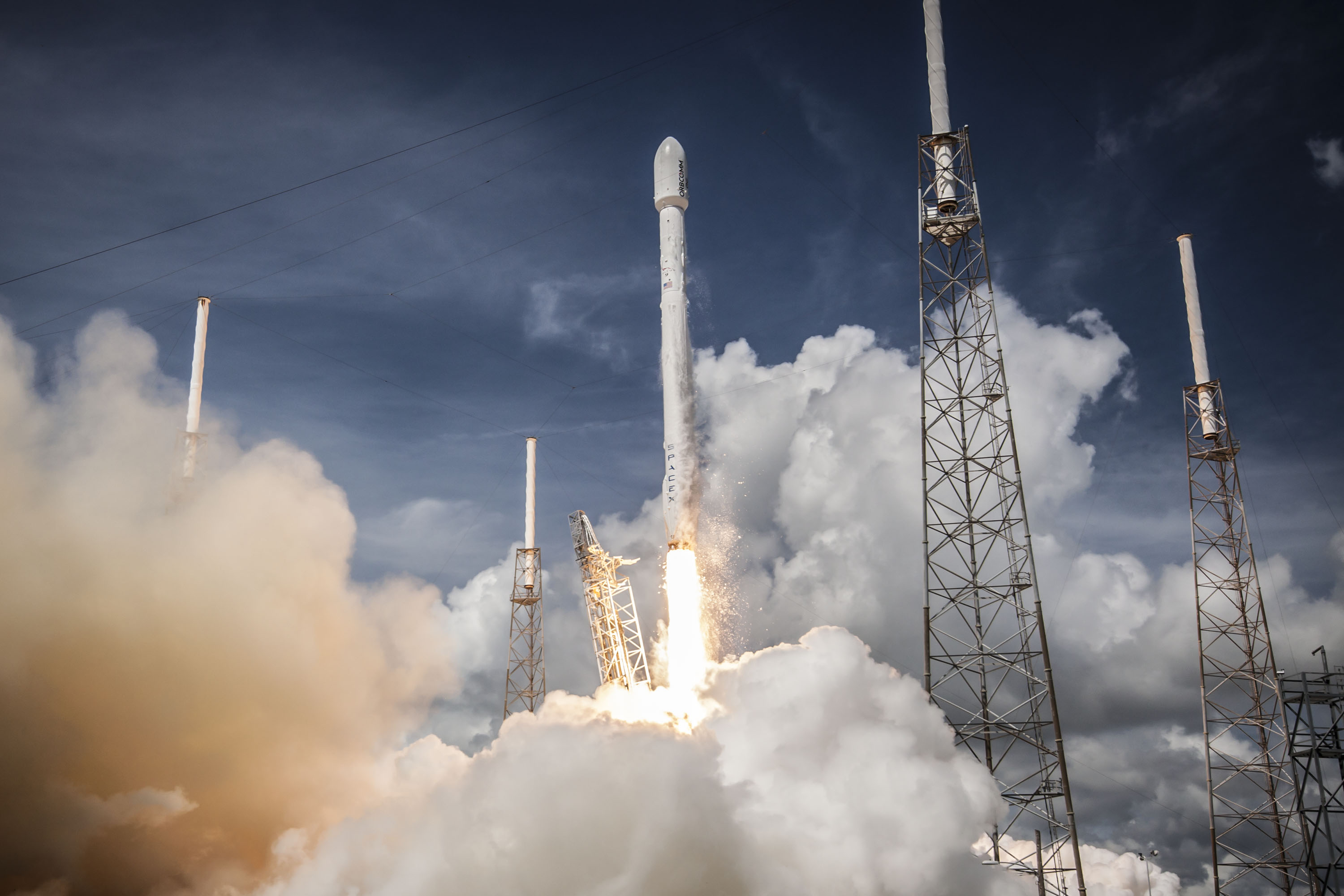
SpaceX's Falcon 9 launch vehicle launched the ORBCOMM-OG2 on 14 July 2014.

Orbcomm Generation 2 (Orbcomm-OG2) second-generation satellites are intended to supplement and eventually replace the current first generation constellation. Eighteen satellites were ordered by 2008 — nominally intended to be launched in three groups of six during 2010–2014 — and by 2015 have all been launched, Orbcomm three flights. Orbcomm has options for a further thirty OG2 satellites. The satellites were launched by SpaceX on the Falcon 9 launch vehicle. Originally, they were to launch on the smaller Falcon 1 launch vehicle.

The first (Orbcomm OG2-1) of these satellites was launched on 8 October 2012 as secondary payload on a SpaceX Falcon 9 v1.0 flight. The primary payload was for NASA to the International Space Station (ISS). On this launch, the Falcon 9 had a failure in one of its nine first stage engines 79 seconds after liftoff from Cape Canaveral, Florida. This prevented the OG2-1 prototype satellite from being deployed into the proper orbit. The satellite functioned as planned during the short time it was in orbit. This allowed a subset of satellite systems to be flight-test validated. The orbit of the satellite was unable to be raised to a sustainable altitude due to contractual limitations put on SpaceX by the primary payload owner, NASA. Two days after its launch the OG2-1 prototype re-entered and burned up in the atmosphere of Earth. Orbcomm claimed the mission a total loss for launch insurance purposes.

The second launch, with a constellation of six OG2 satellites, launched on 14 July 2014. The satellites were launched on a SpaceX Falcon 9 v1.1 launch vehicle. Following the end of the use of the first stage for the Orbcomm orbital mission, SpaceX used the booster stage — which would ordinarily be destroyed on reentering the Earth's atmosphere and impact with the ocean — for a flight test of a number of reusable launch vehicle technologies to reenter and execute a "soft vertical landing" on the ocean surface, where it decelerated, made a reentry, landing burn and deployment of its landing legs. The first stage was not recovered as the hull integrity was breached on landing or on the subsequent "tip over and body slam".

The third launch, with the final 11 second-generation OG2 satellites, was successfully completed December 21, 2015. It was initially scheduled for late-2014, but ORBCOMM delayed the launch until at least mid-2015 finally resetting the launch timeframe to mid-August through late-September 2015. The launch date was further delayed by the rocket failure on the SpaceX Falcon 9 Flight 19 launch in June 2015, which ultimately delayed the OG2 launch further out to late 2015. The satellites were placed by the Falcon 9 launch vehicle "within a fraction of a degree in inclination and 5 km (3.1 mi) in altitude of the intended orbit", and by 9 January 2016, were in the middle of on-orbit testing, while executing propulsion maneuvers that had spread the 11 satellites over a 6,400 km (4,000 mi) orbital arc.

The ORBCOMM OG2 satellites are being manufactured by an industry team led by Sierra Nevada Corporation and Argon ST, a Boeing subsidiary. A total of 18 ORBCOMM next-generation OG2 satellites were in production as of February 2013. ORBCOMM OG2 satellites will provide enhanced ORBCOMM messaging capabilities, increased capacity, and automatic identification systems (AIS) service. The agreement with SpaceX to launch 18 satellites on its Falcon 9 rockets was signed in December 2012 for a total cost of US$42.6 million.

== Launches ==
Launch Date/Time (GMT)	Carrier Rocket	Launch site	Satellite	Alternative Designation	Remarks
01:46, 17 July 1991	Ariane 4 (40)	ELA-2, CSG	Orbcomm-X	Datacomm-X	Early loss of communication
14:30, 9 February 1993	Pegasus	NB-52B, KSC SLF	Orbcomm CDS-1	OXP	No longer operational
13:56, 25 April 1993	Pegasus	NB-52B, Edwards AFB	Orbcomm CDS-2	VSUME	No longer operational
13:48, 3 April 1995	Pegasus-H	L-1011, Vandenberg AFB	Orbcomm-F1	FM1	No longer operational
13:48, 3 April 1995	Pegasus-H	L-1011, Vandenberg AFB	Orbcomm-F2	FM2	No longer operational
19:11, 23 December 1997	Pegasus-XL/HAPS	L-1011, Wallops Island	Orbcomm-A1	FM5	
19:11, 23 December 1997	Pegasus-XL/HAPS	L-1011, Wallops Island	Orbcomm-A2	FM6	
19:11, 23 December 1997	Pegasus-XL/HAPS	L-1011, Wallops Island	Orbcomm-A3	FM7	
19:11, 23 December 1997	Pegasus-XL/HAPS	L-1011, Wallops Island	Orbcomm-A4	FM8	
19:11, 23 December 1997	Pegasus-XL/HAPS	L-1011, Wallops Island	Orbcomm-A5	FM9	
19:11, 23 December 1997	Pegasus-XL/HAPS	L-1011, Wallops Island	Orbcomm-A6	FM10	
19:11, 23 December 1997	Pegasus-XL/HAPS	L-1011, Wallops Island	Orbcomm-A7	FM11	
19:11, 23 December 1997	Pegasus-XL/HAPS	L-1011, Wallops Island	Orbcomm-A8	FM12	
13:20, 10 February 1998	Taurus	LC-576E, Vandenberg AFB	Orbcomm-G1	FM3	No longer operational
13:20, 10 February 1998	Taurus	LC-576E, Vandenberg AFB	Orbcomm-G2	FM4	
16:24, 2 August 1998	Pegasus-XL/HAPS	L-1011, Wallops Island	Orbcomm-B1	FM13	
16:24, 2 August 1998	Pegasus-XL/HAPS	L-1011, Wallops Island	Orbcomm-B2	FM14	
16:24, 2 August 1998	Pegasus-XL/HAPS	L-1011, Wallops Island	Orbcomm-B3	FM15	
16:24, 2 August 1998	Pegasus-XL/HAPS	L-1011, Wallops Island	Orbcomm-B4	FM16	No longer operational. Experienced in-orbit break-up on 22 December 2018 resulting in 34 trackable objects.
16:24, 2 August 1998	Pegasus-XL/HAPS	L-1011, Wallops Island	Orbcomm-B5	FM17	No longer operational
16:24, 2 August 1998	Pegasus-XL/HAPS	L-1011, Wallops Island	Orbcomm-B6	FM18	
16:24, 2 August 1998	Pegasus-XL/HAPS	L-1011, Wallops Island	Orbcomm-B7	FM19	
16:24, 2 August 1998	Pegasus-XL/HAPS	L-1011, Wallops Island	Orbcomm-B8	FM20	
05:06, 23 September 1998	Pegasus-XL/HAPS	L-1011, Wallops Island	Orbcomm-C1	FM21	
05:06, 23 September 1998	Pegasus-XL/HAPS	L-1011, Wallops Island	Orbcomm-C2	FM22	No longer operational
05:06, 23 September 1998	Pegasus-XL/HAPS	L-1011, Wallops Island	Orbcomm-C3	FM23	
05:06, 23 September 1998	Pegasus-XL/HAPS	L-1011, Wallops Island	Orbcomm-C4	FM24	No longer operational
05:06, 23 September 1998	Pegasus-XL/HAPS	L-1011, Wallops Island	Orbcomm-C5	FM25	No longer operational
05:06, 23 September 1998	Pegasus-XL/HAPS	L-1011, Wallops Island	Orbcomm-C6	FM26	No longer operational
05:06, 23 September 1998	Pegasus-XL/HAPS	L-1011, Wallops Island	Orbcomm-C7	FM27	
05:06, 23 September 1998	Pegasus-XL/HAPS	L-1011, Wallops Island	Orbcomm-C8	FM28	No longer operational
18:53, 4 December 1999	Pegasus-XL/HAPS	L-1011, Wallops Island	Orbcomm-D2	FM30	
18:53, 4 December 1999	Pegasus-XL/HAPS	L-1011, Wallops Island	Orbcomm-D3	FM31	
18:53, 4 December 1999	Pegasus-XL/HAPS	L-1011, Wallops Island	Orbcomm-D4	FM32	Semi-operational
18:53, 4 December 1999	Pegasus-XL/HAPS	L-1011, Wallops Island	Orbcomm-D5	FM33	No longer operational
18:53, 4 December 1999	Pegasus-XL/HAPS	L-1011, Wallops Island	Orbcomm-D6	FM34	
18:53, 4 December 1999	Pegasus-XL/HAPS	L-1011, Wallops Island	Orbcomm-D7	FM35	
18:53, 4 December 1999	Pegasus-XL/HAPS	L-1011, Wallops Island	Orbcomm-D8	FM36	No longer operational. Experienced in-orbit break-up on 11 March 2023 resulting in a number of untracked objects.
06:36, 19 June 2008	Kosmos-3M	Site 107, Kapustin Yar	Orbcomm CDS-3	FM29	No longer operational
06:36, 19 June 2008	Kosmos-3M	Site 107, Kapustin Yar	Orbcomm-QL1	FM37	No longer operational
06:36, 19 June 2008	Kosmos-3M	Site 107, Kapustin Yar	Orbcomm-QL2	FM38	No longer operational
06:36, 19 June 2008	Kosmos-3M	Site 107, Kapustin Yar	Orbcomm-QL3	FM39	No longer operational
06:36, 19 June 2008	Kosmos-3M	Site 107, Kapustin Yar	Orbcomm-QL4	FM40	No longer operational
06:36, 19 June 2008	Kosmos-3M	Site 107, Kapustin Yar	Orbcomm-QL5	FM41	No longer operational
05:31, 12 October 2011	PSLV-CA	FLP, Satish Dhawan	VesselSat-1	FM42	No longer operational (since end of 2015)
03:17, 9 January 2012	Long March 4B	LC-9, Taiyuan	VesselSat-2	FM43	No longer operational (since January 2016)
00:35, 8 October 2012	Falcon 9 v1.0 (Flight 4)	SLC-40, Cape Canaveral	Orbcomm OG2-1	FM101	Demo unit launch as a secondary payload, at low cost and with attendant lower launch services. The primary payload owner did not allow the second orbit raising burn, and thus OG2-1 was placed in a much lower orbit. Various tests of the new satellite design were completed, but OG2-1 never became fully operational. The sat reentered in only four days.
15:15, 14 July 2014	Falcon 9 v1.1 (Flight 10)	SLC-40, Cape Canaveral	Orbcomm OG2 × 6	FM103; FM104; FM106; FM107; FM109; FM111	FM104, FM106, and FM111 are no longer operational
01:19, 22 December 2015	Falcon 9 FT (Flight 20)	SLC-40, Cape Canaveral	Orbcomm OG2 × 11	FM105; FM108; FM110; FM112; FM113; FM114; FM115; FM116; FM117; FM118; FM119	FM105 and FM119 are no longer operational.

== See also ==
- Mobile-satellite service
- Satellite phone
- Globalstar
- Iridium Satellite LLC
- Gonets
