= Rate of turn indicator =

Rate of turn indicator or ROTI on board vessels indicates the rate a ship is turning. It indicates the rate a ship is turning in degrees per minute (°/min) . It is one of the most important instruments a helmsman can have when steering a course. It can also be used to turn at a steady rate of turn, which is very important in pilotage water.

== Working ==
The principle of the rate of the turn indicator is based on a gyroscope with an availability of turning in just one direction. When the ship is steering a straight course, the gyroscope will point in a straight direction and the pointer will point to the zero on the display. When the vessel makes a turn to port, the gyroscope will turn to port side due to inertia and this will be pointed on the display of the rate of turn indicator. The same can be said for the starboard side.

== Different types of ROTIs ==
There are two types of rate of turn indicators: a digital type and an analog type. Nowadays the analog type is still the most installed type on board vessels, due to its easy way to read the rate of turn quickly and correctly. The analog type is compulsory, the digital type may be installed in the form of a repeater of the analog type.

== Regulations ==
In SOLAS Section V Reg 19 is written:

2.9 All ships of 50,000 gross tonnage and upwards shall, in addition to meeting the requirements of paragraph 2.8, have: 2.9.1 a rate of turn indicator, or other means, to determine and display the rate of turn; and 2.9.2 a speed and distance measuring device, or other means, to indicate speed and distance over the ground in the forward and athwartships direction.

3. When "other means" are permitted under this regulation, such means must be approved by Administration in accordance with regulation 18.

== Construction requirements ==
The International Maritime Organization has developed some requirements on the development of the rate of turn indicator.

=== Display ===
The requirements for the display of the rate of turn indicator are that the zero has to be on top, the indicator has to go to the left when ship is turning to port side, and vice versa.

=== Scale ===
The scale graduation of the rate of turn indicator has to be linear with a minimum of 30 degrees per minute, an interval of 1° from zero to thirty and every 10 degrees have to be marked by a number. The indication for every 5° and 10° has to be longer than the rest.

=== Accuracy ===
IMO says that a maximum allowed deviation from the real situation shown by the rate of turn indicator is 0.5 degrees. The rate of turn indicator has to keep this accuracy until a speed of 30 knots is reached.

=== Start-up time ===
A rate of turn indicator has to be fully operational within four minutes after start-up.

=== Testing ===
It has to be possible to test the rate of turn indicator.

== AIS ==
If a ship is equipped with an AIS system and a rate of turn indicator, then the rate of turn indicator must be connected to the AIS to send the rate of turn to other vessels. This makes it easier for other vessels to interpret the manoeuvre of the ship.
