= Jugnu (satellite) =

Indian technology demonstration and remote sensing satellite

- Mission type: Remote Sensing; Technology
- Operator: IIT Kanpur
- COSPAR ID: 2011-058B
- SATCAT no.: 37839

Spacecraft properties
- Launch mass: 3 kilograms (6.6 lb)

Start of mission
- Launch date: 12 October 2011
- Rocket: PSLV-CA C18
- Launch site: Satish Dhawan FLP
- Contractor: ISRO

Orbital parameters
- Reference system: Geocentric
- Regime: Low Earth

Jugnu (Hindi: जुगनू), is an Indian technology demonstration and remote sensing CubeSat satellite which was operated by the Indian Institute of Technology Kanpur. Built under the guidance of Dr. N. S. Vyas, it is a nanosatellite which will be used to provide data for agriculture and disaster monitoring. It is a 3-kilogram (6.6 lb) spacecraft, which measures 34 centimetres (13 in) in length by 10 centimetres (3.9 in) in height and width. Its development programme cost around 25 million rupee. It has a design life of one year.

Jugnu was launched on 12 October 2011 into low Earth orbit by a PSLV-CA C18.

== Subsystems ==
=== Imaging ===
This Subsystem captures near IR images of targeted surface on Earth which helps in identification of the utilization of the place. The subsystem consists of a "Near IR camera", an external storage and an On-Board Computer(OBC) which acts as an interface between the two, apart carrying out the image compression/processing. The camera captures a 640X480 px image which is then transferred to an external memory by the OBC. The image is then processed (if required) and transmitted to the ground station. An overall resolution of about 161 X 161 m^{2} per pixel is expected on Earth's surface. The total area of view, on Earth's surface is expected to be around 103 X 77 km^{2}.

=== GPS ===
The GPS payload in Jugnu helps in synchronizing the time of OBC from the time data retrieved from the GPS module. The Orbital Parameters from the GPS is fed into the ADCS system which assists in satellite positioning from time to time.

=== ADCS ===
The Attitude Determination and Control System (ADCS) orients the satellite in a manner such that maximum solar energy is incident on its solar panels. During imaging the satellite must point at a fixed location on Earth in order to capture high-quality images, which is accomplished by the ADCS. Control by the ADCS is necessary to ensure that the antennas, which have narrow beams, are pointed correctly towards the Earth. Gravitational forces from the Sun, Moon, and planets; solar pressure acting on the antennas and satellite body; and magnetic fields create rotational disturbances. Since the satellite moves around the Earth's center in its orbit, the forces described above vary cyclically. This tends to set up nutation of the satellite which is damped using ADCS.

=== Thermal ===
The Thermal Control Subsystem (TCS) maintains the temperature within the specified limit of 298K to 323K. It ensures that no large thermal gradients and no excessive thermal stress across the structures occur. The Thermal control subsystem of JUGNU is essentially passive with MLI sheets, OSR and surface coatings as key components. It also has IC and thermocouple based sensors to provide for the feedback and maintain the health of sensitive IC's and Camera. The heat that is produced at the chip level is rapidly distributed to the system to prevent it from getting damaged.

=== Other subsytems ===
Inertial Measurement Unit (IMU) system is used to measure vibrations in the satellite and angular rate of the satellite which is used to test the performance of the MEMS based sensors and to provide position and orientation data to OBC. Ejection Subsystem is the interface between the satellite and the rocket. It is a box like structure that is bolted on the deck of the rocket nose top with the satellite placed inside that box. It separates from the rocket with small initial velocity imparted by a spring sitting at the base of the ejection system. It is an indigenous ejection system which can be used for future launches.

== Mission goals and objectives ==
The main goal of the mission was to make a Nano Satellite at IIT Kanpur that can be used as Micro Imaging Systems, GPS receiver for locating the position of satellite in the orbit and MEMS based Inertial Measurement Unit(IMU).
The Primary Objectives of the mission were:

1. To initiate research activities towards development of MEMS based Nano-satellite.
2. To test new cheap solutions for the future cost effective space missions.
3. To set the path for future up gradations and study such validation concepts for possible up gradations.

Its long-term objectives were:

1. To develop competence in design, fabrication and usage of micro satellites.
2. Complement the development efforts of India's satellite application requirements through technology development and validation at the micro satellite level.
3. Development and training of human resources.
4. Strengthen activities in MEMS sensor based technology applications.
