= Luxspace =

European space systems contractor based in Betzdorf, Luxembourg

LuxSpace is a European space systems contractor based in Betzdorf in Luxembourg. It was founded in November 2004 as a daughter company of OHB AG, and began operations in January 2005.

== History ==
On 23 September 2009 the PathFinder2A (a.k.a. Rubin-9.1, AIS-Pathfinder 2) payload aboard the Rubin-9 satellite (COSPAR 2009-051F; the Rubin-9 "satellite" was actually the upper stage of the carrier rocket that the payloads were solidly bolted onto; after the rocket had finished its mission with the primary payload, the upper stage remained in space and became "satellite" Rubin-9) was launched by a PSLV-CA rocket. This was LuxSpace's first orbital operation. The satellite carried another payload (Rubin 9.2) by OHB-System. As of 2019, both payloads (and thus the whole satellite) are non-operational.

The company's first own, independent (no shared payload by another company) satellite VesselSat-1 was launched on October 12, 2011, as part of the GapFiller program; followed by its twin VesselSat-2 on January 9, 2012.

In 2014 (launch 23 October 2014, 18:00 UTC), LuxSpace performed the 4M or Manfred Memorial Moon Mission, the first private Moon mission. The mission consisted of an amateur radio payload (total mass of payload was 14 kg) that was sent on a close lunar flyby aboard a Chinese Long March 3C/G2 rocket's upper stage. The 4M payload was solidly bolted onto the upper stage of the rocket and did not separate. The Chinese rocket performed the Chang'e 5-T1 lunar flyby mission to test technology for future lunar sample return mission Chang'e 5. The Chang'e 5-T1 test flight sent a space capsule on a flight around the Moon and back toward Earth, with the capsule landing on Earth in the end of the mission. The 4M payload's nominal lifetime was 8 days.

LuxSpace built the ESAIL satellite for the Canadian operator exactEarth under ESA's SAT‐AIS programme (a part of ESA's Partnership Projects) for tracking ships. ESAIL is the first commercial microsatellite of the program. ESAIL was launched on 3 September 2021 aboard Arianespace Vega rocket. The launch will take place on the Vega Small Spacecraft Mission Service (SSMS) Proof of Concept (POC) flight.

=== Future missions ===
In May 2021, LuxSpace started the development of their next platform, Triton-X, a microsatellite in the 50-200 kg wet mass range, with high on-board processing capabilities and targeting particularly the commercial space market.

In Fall 2021, LuxSpace, in collaboration with RHEA and OHB, signed a long-term contract with the Luxembourg Ministry of Defense for the in-orbit operations of a Luxembourg Earth Observation satellite.
