= BeIN Channels Network =

Direct broadcast satellite company in Qatar

beIN Channels Network
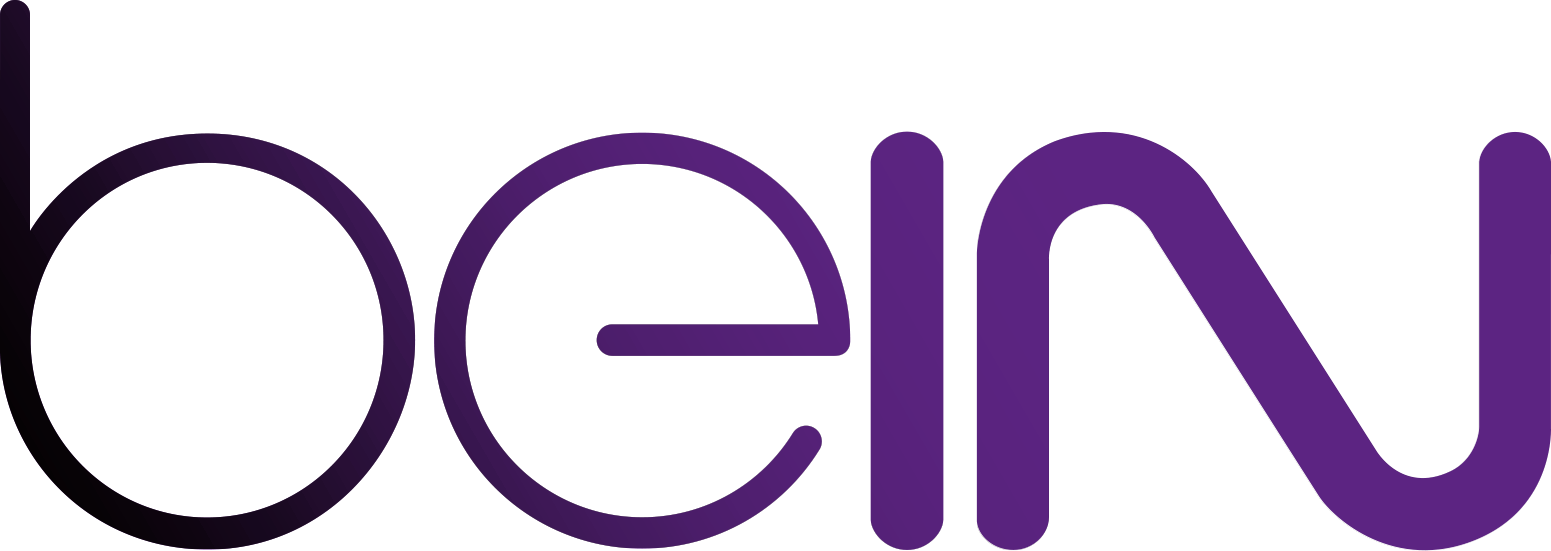
- Type: Subsidiary
- Branding: beIN
- Country: Qatar
- Availability: Middle East & North Africa
- Headquarters: Doha, Qatar
- Regions: Middle East and North Africa (excluding Israel)
- Parent: beIN Media Group
- Key people: Nasser Al-Khelaïfi (Chairman); Yousef Al-Obaidly (CEO)
- Launch date: 1 November 2015; 11 years ago
- Products: Direct broadcast satellite, pay television, pay-per-view
- Subsidiaries: beIN Sports; beIN Max; beIN Movies; beIN Box Office; beIN Series; beIN Connect; TOD
- Official website: www.bein.com
- Notes

beIN Channels Network (/ˈbiːɪn/; stylized as beIN) is a direct broadcast satellite service provider and broadcaster owned by beIN Media Group, which is based in Doha, Qatar.

== Technology ==
beIN had launched 6 multi-function interactive decoders:

- Sagemcom 4K
- beIN 1000s
- Humax HD Mini
- Humax C1
- Humax 3030
- Humax 4030

== Channels ==
=== Sports ===
- beIN Sports (free channel)
- beIN Sports News
- beIN Sports 1
- beIN Sports 2
- beIN Sports 3
- beIN Sports 4
- beIN Sports 5
- beIN Sports 6
- beIN Sports 7
- beIN Sports 8
- beIN Sports 9
- beIN Sports XTRA 1
- beIN Sports XTRA 2
- beIN Sports XTRA 3
- beIN Sports XTRA 4
- beIN Sports XTRA 5
- beIN Sports XTRA 6
- beIN Sports XTRA 7
- beIN Sports XTRA 8
- beIN Sports XTRA 9
- beIN Sports 1 (English)
- beIN Sports 2 (English)
- beIN Sports 1 (French)
- beIN Sports 2 (French)
- beIN Sports NBA
- beIN Sports Max 1
- beIN Sports Max 2
- beIN Sports Max 3
- beIN Sports Max 4
- beIN Sports Max 5
- beIN Sports Max 6
- beIN Sports AFC
- beIN Sports AFC 1
- beIN Sports AFC 2
- beIN Sports AFC 3
- beIN Sports AFC 4
- beIN Sports AFC 5
- beIN Sports AFC 6

=== Movies ===
- beIN Movies 1 (Premiere)
- beIN Movies 2 (Action)
- beIN Movies 3 (Drama)
- beIN Movies 4 (Family)
- beIN Box Office 1
- beIN Box Office 2
- Star Movies
- Star Action

=== Entertainment ===
- beIN Series 1
- beIN Series 2
- Star World
- Food Network
- HGTV
- Travel Channel

=== News ===
- CNN International
- Al Jazeera English
- Bloomberg
- France 24 Arabic
- France 24 English
- France 24 French
- Euronews
- BBC News

=== Documentary ===
- National Geographic
- Nat Geo Wild
- Al Jazeera Documentary
- BBC Earth
- Discovery Channel

=== UHD ===
- beIN 4K

== See also ==
- beIN Sports
  - MENA
  - France
  - Spain (closed in 2019 (Sports) and 2020 (all platforms))
  - USA
  - Canada
  - Australia
  - Turkey
  - Somalia
  - Hong Kong
  - Indonesia
- beIN Series
- beIN Media Group
