= 2021 CONCACAF Gold Cup broadcasting rights =

The 2021 CONCACAF Gold Cup was an international football tournament that took place in July and August 2021, involving sixteen men's national teams from nations affiliated to the Confederation of North, Central America and Caribbean Association Football (CONCACAF). The tournament was broadcast via television and radio all over the world.

== Television ==
=== CONCACAF ===
| Country | Broadcaster(s) | Ref. |
|---|---|---|
| Canada | OneSoccer | |
| Central America | ESPN | |
| Costa Rica | Teletica; Repretel | |
| El Salvador | TCS | |
| French Guiana | France Télévisions | |
| Guadeloupe | France Télévisions | |
| Haiti | Publicidades USA | |
| Honduras | Televicentro | |
| Martinique | France Télévisions | |
| Mexico | Televisa; TV Azteca | |
| Panama | Medcom; TVN | |
| Suriname | HAC Media | |
| United States | Fox Sports; Univision | |

=== International ===
| | Broadcaster | Ref |
|---|---|---|
| International (unsold markets) | Concacaf GO | |
| Australia | Sport Flick | |
| Austria | Sportdigital | |
| Balkans | Arena Sport | |
| Brunei | beIN Sports | |
| East Timor | beIN Sports | |
| France | beIN Sports | |
| Germany | Sportdigital | |
| Hong Kong | beIN Sports | |
| Indonesia | beIN Sports; Mola | |
| Ireland | Premier Sports | |
| Israel | Charlton | |
| Laos | beIN Sports | |
| Malaysia | beIN Sports | |
| MENA | Alkass TV | |
| Netherlands | Ziggo Sport | |
| New Zealand | beIN Sports; Sport Flick | |
| Philippines | beIN Sports | |
| Singapore | beIN Sports | |
| Spain | Gol | |
| Switzerland | Sportdigital | |
| Thailand | beIN Sports | |
| Turkey | beIN Sports | |
| United Kingdom | Premier Sports | |

== Radio ==
=== CONCACAF ===
| Country | Broadcaster | Ref. |
|---|---|---|
| Costa Rica | Grupo Columbia | |
| Guatemala | Inversiones Also; Emisoras Unidas; Sonora | |
| Honduras | Radio America | |
| Panama | Ser TV | |
| United States | Fútbol de Primera | |
