= Àxel Torres =

Spanish journalist

- Born: Àxel Torres Xirau; March 13, 1983 (age 43); Barcelona, Spain
- Occupation: Journalist
- Years active: 1983–present
- Employers: Cadena SER; As; Movistar+

Àxel Torres Xirau (born 13 March 1983) is a Spanish journalist specialising in international football. He works for the Movistar+ television platform, where he commentates on key matches on the Movistar LaLiga and Movistar Liga de Campeones channels, as well as participating as an analyst on other programmes such as "La Casa del Fútbol" and "Noche de Champions", and co-hosting "El Tercer Tiempo".

On radio, he is the main international football analyst for the SER, radio station, on programmes such as "Carrusel Deportivo" or "El Larguero". He carried out this work on the COPE channel (2000–2006), and later within Unidad Editorial on Radio Marca (2006–2015), where he presented "Marcador Internacional". In the written press, he is an analyst and columnist for the newspaper AS.

== Biography ==
He was born in Barcelona in 1983, but has lived most of his life in Sabadell, a city to which he is still linked. He studied journalism at the Autonomous University of Barcelona. He is a declared supporter of CE Sabadell, his hometown club, and of the English club Arsenal, since the times of Arsène Wenger.

== Trajectory ==
=== COPE ===
His professional career began at the age of 17 with contributions on international football for the COPE, channel, following reports he sent to the station on various foreign teams and youth competitions, which were surprising for their exhaustive nature. Initially, he went on air to analyse the foreign rivals of Spanish teams, making his debut as a commentator on September 12, 2000, on Tiempo de Juego, broadcasting a Sporting–Real Madrid, and the following day, from the Camp Nou, a Barcelona–Leeds, both corresponding to the first matchday of the Champions League.

He gradually increased his presence on the air, taking part in news bulletins and in all the channel's sports programmes. He was appointed by the head of sports, José Antonio Abellán, and by the director of Tiempo de Juego, Edu Garca, as head of the international football content area, covering his first event as a special correspondent for COPE, the 2003 UEFA Cup final in Seville, and, at national team level, Euro 2004 in Portugal and the 2006 World Cup in Germany.

During this time, he established his personal blog, "Planeta Axel," which he later adapted for television, narrated Segunda B and Tercera División matches on the local Barcelona radio station Ràdio Salut, and collaborated with written media such as Público, and the premium football magazine Panenka.

=== Radio Marca ===
In September 2006, he swapped COPE for Radio Marca. At Unidad Editorial's thematic radio station, and in synergy with the programme directed by Edu Garca "Marcador", between September 2007 and June 2015, he hosted "Marcador Internacional," a programme dedicated to the analysis and broadcasting of matches in foreign competitions.

During this period, together with Toni Padilla and Raúl Fuentes, he set up the international football multimedia portal marcadorint.com, and in 2013 he published his first book, "11 Ciudades" (11 Cities), published by Contra.

=== Mediapro ===
Gol Televisión

Àxel made his television debut in 2008 on Mediapro's newly launched pay channel, Gol Televisión.He was the commentator for the most important matches of the main competitions broadcast by the channel, and he presented his international football report programme "Planeta Axel" for seven seasons, until the channel's conversion in July 2015 to beIN Sports Spain. Since June 2016, the Gol Televisión brand has been Mediapro's national free-to-air DTT channel.

beIN Sports Spain

With the launch in July 2015 of the Spanish subsidiary of the beIN Sports – beIN Sports Spain, oint venture between Mediapro and Qatar's Al Jazeera, which debuted with the broadcasting rights to the two UEFA continental club competitions for the three-year period 2015–2018, Axel Torres continued as the channel's journalist of reference, presenting between 2015 and 2018 the central analysis and debate programme "El Club", broadcast at midnight. In addition, during the 2016–2019 triennium, he commented on the most important matches of each LaLiga matchday on the beIN LaLiga channel.

=== Movistar+ and PRISA ===
Since the 2018/19 season, he has been part of the Movistar+ sports team, after Telefónica acquired the rights to the Champions League and Europa League for the three-year period 2018–2021 and the National League Championship for the period 2019–2022. On the Movistar Liga de Campeones channel, he is the match commentator and analyst for the pre and post matchdays of the two continental competitions. On the Movistar LaLiga channel, he is a commentator, alongside Jorge Valdano and the narrator José Sanchis, for one of the two most important matches of the day, and an analyst on the programme "La Casa del Fútbol", which follows and summarises the league matchday.

In radio and print media, he collaborates with PRISA, SER and AS. Since September 2015, he has been the main international football specialist on Cadena SER, appearing on programmes such as "Carrusel Deportivo" or "El Larguero". Since September 2019, he has been analysing the opponents of Spanish clubs and the national team in important matches for the newspaper AS.

== Bibliography ==
- Torres, Àxel (2013). 11 Ciudades. Contra. ISBN 978-84-940938-1-4.
- Torres, Àxel (2014). Franz. Jürgen. Pep. Contra. ISBN 978-84-942167-4-9.
- Torres, Àxel (2017). El faro de Dalatangi. Contra. ISBN 978-84-946833-0-5.
- Torres, Àxel (2024). Crónicas Balcánicas. Contra. ISBN 978-84-100450-5-7.
