= BeIN Sports (Spanish TV channel) =

beIN Sports
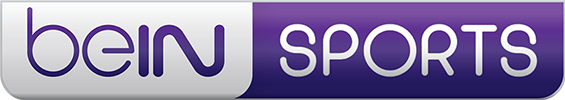
- Country: Spain
- Broadcast area: Spain, Andorra
- Network: beIN Sports
- Headquarters: Barcelona, Spain

Programming
- Language(s): Spanish
- Picture format: 576i (SDTV); 1080i (HDTV); 2160p (UHDTV)

Ownership
- Owner: beIN Media Group & Mediapro
- Sister channels: beIN Sports MENA beIN Sports France beIN Sports USA beIN Sports Canada beIN Sports Australia beIN Sports Turkey beIN Sports Asia

History
- Launched: 1 July 2015; 10 years ago
- Closed: 9 August 2018; 7 years ago (non-La Liga MAX channels); 16 August 2019; 6 years ago (La Liga channels)
- Former names: Gol Televisión

beIN Sports Spain was a Spanish network of sports channels owned by Qatari Sports Investments (an affiliate of beIN Media Group) and operated by Mediapro. It was the Spanish version of the global sports network beIN Sports.

beIN Sports held the rights to broadcast several major association football tournaments on Spanish television. From the 2016/2017 season, Bein Sports broadcast La Liga and Copa del Rey, featuring exclusive coverage of the two main European competitions UEFA Champions League and UEFA Europa League, the two main South American competitions Copa Libertadores and Copa Sudamericana and top national leagues including Ligue 1 and Serie A, along with content from other leagues in Europe and the main national cups including Coupe de France, KNVB Beker, DFB-Pokal and Copa do Brasil.

== History ==
On 1 July 2015, after the closure of Gol Televisión, beIN Sports Spain officially launched in Spain on the online platform TotalChannel and Gol Stadium owned by Mediapro. Keeping the channel free viewing until 31 August only for those who were paid to Gol Televisión. On 1 August 2015, beIN Sports became available on the main national cable and satellite platforms.

BeIN Sports launched a YouTube pay channel on 20 October 2015, which later closed in November 2016.

On 9 August 2018, after having lost its biggest broadcasting rights in the territory (the UEFA Champions League, the UEFA Europa League and international leagues) the channel ceased its broadcasts, selling the few sports rights it still held to Movistar Liga de Campeones, Champions League, with limitations given by the National Commission of Markets and Competition.

=== Bein Connect ===
Mediapro operated beIN Connect in Spain, launched on 22 July 2015.

In 2017, it launched an entertainment TV bouquet, including Fox, AXN, Fox Life, TNT, TCM, Historia, Comedy Central, National Geographic and Nickelodeon. It was the first OTT offer in Spain.

After the closure of Bein Sports España, the entertainment bouquet disappeared in 2019. Gol remained available on the service until 10 March 2020 when beIN Connect España was definitively closed.

== Programming ==
beIN Sports Spain featured live and recorded events from the following leagues and competitions:

=== Football ===
UEFA

- Spain: La Liga (8/10 matches per week and the first El Clásico), Copa del Rey and Primera División (women)
- France: Ligue 1.
- Italy: Serie A.

== See also ==
- beIN Sports
- beIN Sports MENA
- beIN Sports France
- beIN Sports Turkey
- beIN Sports USA
- beIN Sports Australia
- beIN Sports Canada
