= 2014 FIFA World Cup broadcasting rights =

The broadcasting rights for the 2014 FIFA World Cup were sold directly by FIFA, or through licensed companies or organizations such as the European Broadcasting Union, Organización de Televisión Iberoamericana, African Union of Broadcasting, International Media Content, Inter-Sports Marketing, M-League, Dentsu, RS International Broadcasting & Sports Management and MP & Silva. Airlines companies such as Etihad Airways had in-flight live telecasts of all 64 matches.

Several territories and countries (for example, India, Italy, Algeria, Korea Republic) are grouped as they share common broadcasters, and sometimes, common geographic space.

For the first time in FIFA World Cup history, matches were filmed and broadcast in ultra-high-definition (UHD) and high-dynamic range (HDR) with 5.1 surround sound.

== Television ==
Nation/Territory	Broadcaster	Ref
Abkhazia	GPB, Channel One Russia, VGTRK	
Afghanistan	Ariana TV	
Albania	RTSH	
Algeria	EPTV (Télévision Algérienne) beIN Sports	
Andorra	TF1, Mediaset España, beIN Sports France, beIN Sports Spain, Gol Televisión	
Angola	TPA	
Aruba	TeleAruba	
Armenia	ARMTV	
Argentina	TyC Sports, TV Pública Digital, DirecTV Sports	
Australia	SBS	
Austria	ORF	
Azerbaijan	İTV	
Belarus	BTRC	
Bangladesh	BTV, Maasranga Television, Gazi Television	
Belgium	VRT, RTBF	
Benin	ORTB	
Bolivia	Unitel, Red Uno, Bolivia TV	
Botswana	BRTS	
Bosnia and Herzegovina	BHRT	
Brazil	Globo, Band, SporTV, ESPN Brasil, Fox Sports, BandSports	
Brunei	Astro	
Bulgaria	BNT	
Burkina Faso	RTB	
Burundi	RTNB	
Cameroon	CRTV	
Cambodia	CTN	
Canada	CBC, Sportsnet, TVA Sports, TLN, Univision Canada, Fairchild TV, Talentvision	
Canary Islands	Mediaset España, BeIN Sports, Gol Televisión	
Cape Verde	RTC	
Caribbean List of countries/colonies: Anguilla; Antigua and Barbuda; Aruba^{1}; Bahamas; Barbados; Belize; Bermuda; Bonaire; British Virgin Islands; Cayman Islands; Curaçao; Dominica; Dominican Republic; Grenada; Guyana; Haiti; Jamaica^{2}; Montserrat; Saint Kitts and Nevis; Saint Lucia; Saint Vincent and the Grenadines; Suriname^{3}; Trinidad and Tobago^{4}; Turks and Caicos Islands; U.S. Virgin Islands^{5}	SportsMax	
Central African Republic	RTC	
Ceuta	Mediaset España, beIN Sports, Gol Televisión	
Chad	RTNT	
Chile	TVN, Canal 13, DirecTV Sports, Movistar	
China PR	CCTV	
Colombia	Caracol TV, RCN TV, DirecTV Sports	
Congo	TNC	
Corsica	TF1, RAI, beIN Sports, Sky Sport	
Costa Rica	Repretel, Teletica, Millicom	
Crimea	Channel One Russia, VGTRK, NTKU, Ukrayina	
Croatia	HRT	
Cuba	Tele Rebelde	
Cyprus	CyBC	
Czech Republic	Czech Television	
Denmark	DR, TV 2	
Democratic Republic of Congo	RTNC	
Ecuador	Gama, TC Mi Canal, Oromar, DirecTV Sports	
El Salvador	TCS	
Equatorial Guinea	RDEG	
Eritrea	EBC	
Estonia	ERR	
Ethiopia	ETV	
Falkland Islands	KTV Ltd.	
Faroe Islands	DR, KVF	
Fiji	Mai TV	
Finland	Yle	
France and territories: Guadeloupe; Martinique; French Guiana; Réunion; Mayotte; French Polynesia; Saint Pierre and Miquelon; Wallis and Futuna; Collectivity of Saint Martin; Saint Barthélemy; New Caledonia; French Southern and Antarctic Lands; Clipperton Island	TF1, beIN Sports, France Télévisions^{6}	
Gabon	RTG	
Gambia	GRTS	
Ghana	GBC, Metro TV	
Georgia	GPB	
Germany	ARD, ZDF	
Gibraltar	Mediaset España, BBC, ITV, Gol Televisión	
Greece	NERIT, Nova Sports	
Greenland	DR, KNR	
Guatemala	Albavisión, Radio Televisión Guatemala	
Guernsey	BBC, ITV, TF1, beIN Sports	
Guinea	RTG	
Guinea-Bissau	RTVGB	
Hong Kong	TVB	
Honduras	Televicentro, VTV, Sky	
Hungary	MTV, Digi Sport	
Iceland	RÚV, 365	
India	Sony SIX, Sony KIX	
Indonesia	ANTV, tvOne, K-Vision	
Iran	IRIB	
Ireland	RTÉ	
Israel	IBA, Reshet	
Italian Peninsula List of countries: Italy; San Marino; Vatican City	RAI, Sky Sport	
Ivory Coast	RTI	
Jamaica	CVM Television	
Japan	Japan Consortium (Fuji TV, NHK, Nippon Television, TBS, TV Asahi, TV Tokyo)	
Jersey	BBC, ITV, TF1, beIN Sports	
Kaliningrad Oblast	Channel One Russia, VGTRK, TVP, LRT	
Kazakhstan	Kazakhstan, Perviy Kanal Evraziya	
Kenya	KBC	
Kyrgyzstan	NTS	
Korea DPR	SBS	
Korea Republic	KBS, SBS, MBC	
Kosovo	RTK, Digit-Alb	
Laos	TVLAO	
Latvia	LTV	
Lesotho	LBC	
Liberia	LBS	
Liechtenstein	SRG SSR	
Lithuania	LRT	
Luxembourg	VRT, RTBF	
Macau	TDM	
Macedonia	MRT	
Madagascar	MATV	
Malawi	MBC	
Malaysia	RTM (only terrestrial network), Astro	
Maldives	MBC, MSM	
Mali	ORTM	
Malta	PBS	
Mauritius	MBC	
Melilla	Mediaset España, beIN Sports, Gol Televisión	
Mexico	Televisa, TV Azteca, Sky	
Middle East and North Africa List of countries: Algeria; Bahrain; Comoros; Djibouti; Egypt; Iraq; Jordan; Kuwait; Lebanon; Libya; Mauritania; Morocco; Oman; Palestine; Qatar; Saudi Arabia; Somalia; Sudan; Syria; Tunisia; United Arab Emirates; Western Sahara; Yemen	beIN Sports; ENTV-Terrestrial (Team games only, in Algeria); Teleliban-terrestrial (in Lebanon)	
Moldova	TRM	
Monaco	TF1, beIN Sports	
Mongolia	ETV	
Montenegro	RTCG	
Mozambique	TVM	
Myanmar	Sky Net	
Nagorno-Karabakh	İTV, ARMTV	
Namibia	NBC	
Nepal	NTV, Kantipur Television Network	
Netherlands	NOS	
New Zealand	TVNZ, Sky Sport	
Nicaragua	Telemetro, Ratensa; Sky	
Niger	ORTN	
Nigeria	Broadcasting Organisation of Nigeria; Optima Sports Management International	
Northern Cyprus	CyBC, TRT	
Northern Ireland	BBC, ITV, RTÉ	
Norway	NRK, TV 2	
Oceania List of countries: American Samoa^{5}; Cook Islands; Fiji; Kiribati; Micronesia; Nauru; Niue; Northern Mariana Islands^{5}; Palau; Papua New Guinea; Samoa; Solomon Islands; Tonga; Tuvalu; Vanuatu	Click Pacific	
Pakistan	PTV Sports, Ten Sports	
Panama	Corporación Medcom, Televisora Nacional, Cable Onda; Sky	
Paraguay	SNT, Telefuturo, Tigo Sports	
Peru	ATV, DirecTV Sports	
Philippines,	ABS-CBN, ABS-CBN Sports & Action	
Poland	TVP	
Portugal	RTP, CMTV, SportTV	
Romania	TVR	
Russia	Channel One Russia, VGTRK	
Rwanda	Télévision Rwandaise	
Sardinia	RAI, TF1, Sky Sport, BeIN Sports	
Senegal	RTS	
Serbia	RTS	
Seychelles	SBC	
Sicily	RAI, Sky Sport, PBS	
Sierra Leone	SLBS	
Singapore	Okto, Singtel mioTV	
Slovakia	RTVS	
Slovenia	RTV Slovenija	
South Africa	SABC, SuperSport	
South Asia List of countries: Afghanistan; Bangladesh; Bhutan; British Indian Ocean Territory; India; Maldives; Nepal; Pakistan; Sri Lanka	Sony SIX, Seven3	
Spain	Mediaset España, Gol Televisión	
Sri Lanka	SLRC	
Sub-Saharan Africa^{7} List of countries: Angola; Benin; Botswana; Burkina Faso; Burundi; Cameroon; Cape Verde; Central African Republic; Chad; Congo; Côte d'Ivoire; DR Congo; Equatorial Guinea; Eritrea; Ethiopia; Gabon; Gambia; Ghana; Guinea-Bissau; Guinea; Kenya; Lesotho; Liberia; Madagascar; Malawi; Mali; Mauritius; Mozambique; Namibia; Niger; Nigeria^{8}; Rwanda; Senegal; Seychelles; Sierra Leone; Swaziland; Tanzania; Togo; Uganda; Zambia; Zimbabwe	SuperSport, Canal+^{7}	
Suriname	STVS	
Swaziland	STVA	
Sweden	SVT, TV4	
Switzerland	SRG SSR	
Taiwan	ELTA TV, Era Television, TVBS	
Tajikistan	TVT	
Tanzania	TBS	
Thailand	RS Public Company Limited: Channel 8, BBTV Ch7, Channel 5	
Timor-Leste	RTTL	
Togo	TVT	
Trentino-Alto Adige/Südtirol	RAI, Sky Sport, ORF	
Trinidad and Tobago	One Caribbean Media	
Turkey	TRT	
Turkmenistan	Turkmenistan TV	
Uganda	UBC	
Ukraine	NTKU, Ukrayina	
United Kingdom Home Nations and Territories: England; Scotland; Wales; Isle of Man	BBC, ITV	
United States and territories: American Samoa; Guam; Northern Mariana Islands; Puerto Rico; U.S. Virgin Islands^{9}; Baker Island; Howland Island; Jarvis Island; Johnston Atoll; Kingman Reef; Midway Islands; Navassa Island; Palmyra Atoll; Wake Island	ABC, ESPN, Univision	
Uruguay	Monte Carlo TV, Channel 10, Channel 12	
Uzbekistan	NTRC	
Venezuela	Meridiano Televisión, Venevisión, TVes, Televen, DirecTV Sports	
Vietnam	VTV	
Zambia	ZNBC, MUVI TV	
Zimbabwe	ZBC	

== Notes ==
^1 - Alongside TeleAruba
^2 - Alongside CVM Television.
^3 - Alongside STVS.
^4 - Alongside One Caribbean Media.
^5 - Alongside ABC and ESPN.
^6 - FT only covered the tournament in the French overseas territories
^7 - Each country also received coverage of the event by a domestic broadcaster.
^8 - Nigeria did not receive coverage from Canal+.
^9 - Alongside SportsMax. Also, not covered by Univision.
