= BeIN Series =

BeIN Series may refer to:

- BeIN Series (Middle East TV channel)
- beIN Series (Turkish TV channel)
