= BeIN Sports =

Qatari state-owned multinational network of sports channels

beIN Sports
- Type: State-owned
- Country: Qatar
- Broadcast area: United States; Canada; Australia; New Zealand; France; MENA; Southeast Asia; Turkey
- Headquarters: Doha, Qatar (MENA Channel); Miami, U.S. (American and Canadian channels); Paris, France (French Channel); Istanbul, Turkey (Turkish Channel); Sydney, Australia (Australia and New Zealand channels)

Programming
- Languages: Arabic; English; French; Spanish; Turkish
- Picture format: 1080p MPEG-4 HDTV

Ownership
- Owner: beIN Media Group
- Key people: Nasser Al-Khelaifi (Chairman); Yousef Al-Obaidly (CEO)
- Sister channels: beJunior; beIN Series; beIN Movies; beIN Gourmet; beIN Drama

History
- Launched: 1 June 2012; 14 years ago

Links
- Website: beinsports.com

Availability

Streaming media
- beIN Sports Connect: connect.beinsports.com

beIN Sports (/ˈbiːɪn/ BEE-in) is a Qatari multinational network of sports channels owned and operated by the state-owned media group beIN. The network has played a major role in the increased commercialization of Qatari sports. Its chairman is Nasser Al-Khelaifi, and its CEO is Yousef Obaidly.

beIN Sports is the dominant television sports channel in the MENA region. It also operates channels in France, United States, Canada, Australia, New Zealand, Turkey, Hong Kong, Singapore, Brunei, Malaysia, Indonesia, Philippines and Thailand.

== Ownership ==
beIN Sports is owned and funded by the state of Qatar through its parent company, beIN Media Group.

== History ==
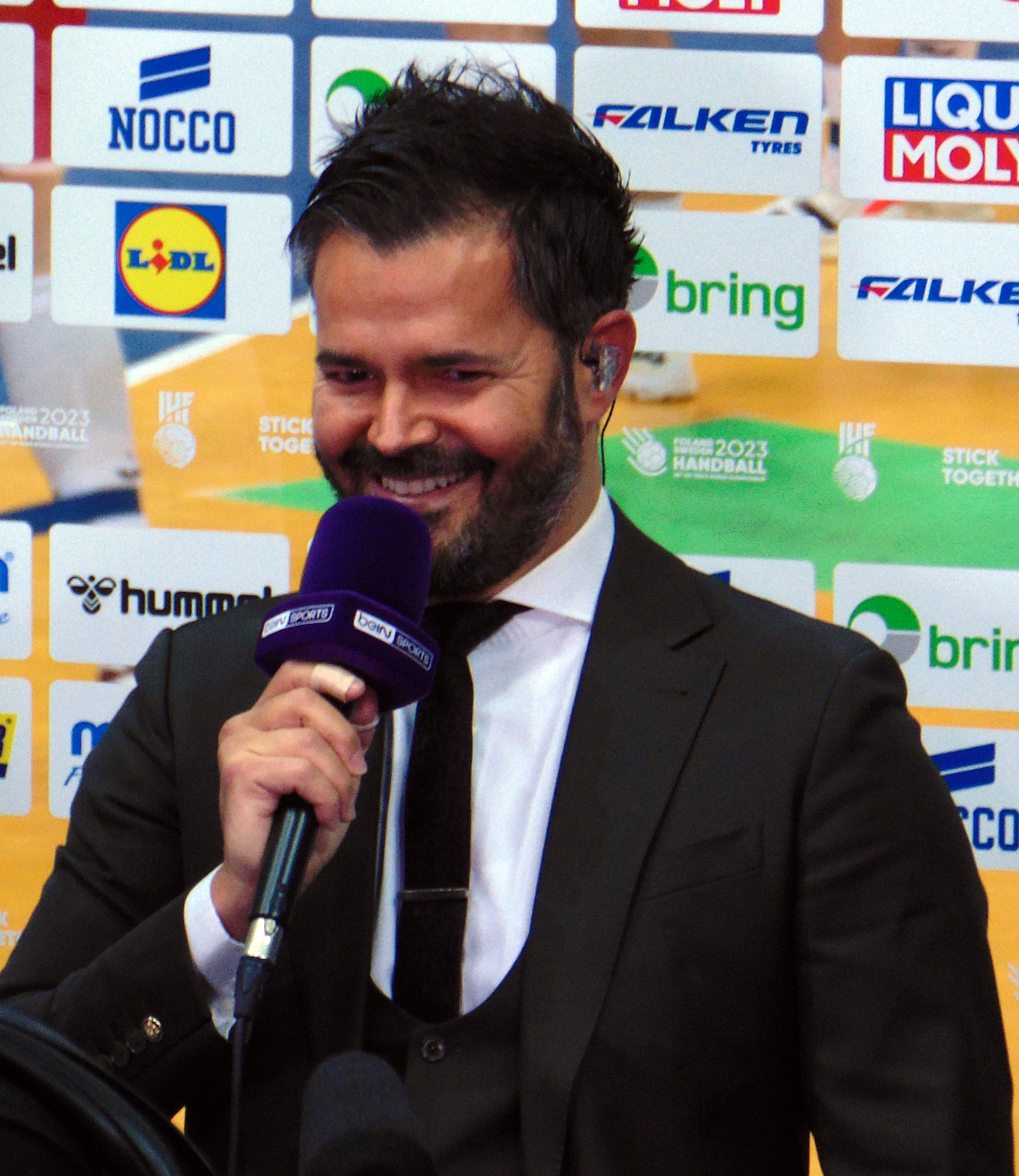
beIN Sports reporter Thomas Ferro Villechaize

Al Jazeera Media Network entered the European television rights market in June 2011 when it purchased a package of live French football Ligue 1 matches from 2012 to 2016 for €90 million a year. The deal makes them joint broadcasters of domestic top-flight football in France alongside long-term rights holders Canal+. The broadcaster also acquired the pay-TV rights to the UEFA Champions League, Europa League from 2012 to 2015, Euro 2012 and Euro 2016 in France. France was targeted as Al Jazeera's first entry into Europe due to the fact that there were no dedicated sports channels, unlike in the United Kingdom.

The name "beIN Sports" was first revealed in early 2012. According to Nasser Al-Khelaifi, the director of Al Jazeera Sports, the name "symbolises the mind of two channels aiming at bringing live and exclusive broadcasting of the biggest events." Former Canal+ executive Charles Bietry was hired by Al Jazeera to launch the channels. The channels were made available on all cable and IPTV providers and select satellite providers. CanalSat – owned by Canal+ Group – has declined to carry the channels as of March 2012. beIN Sports was officially launched on June 1, 2012, in time to broadcast Euro 2012. beIN Sports 2 commenced on July 27, 2012, in time to broadcast the French Ligue 2 season, and before the start of the 2012–13 Ligue 1 season. In June 2015, it was announced that Nasser Al-Khelaifi had plans to create the beIN Sports channel on TV operators to cable in Brazil.

beIN Sports Spain officially began broadcasting on 1 July 2015, the date on which Gol Televisión ceased broadcasting all football games, which during the summer were in place under the slogan "Change the game", "Cambia el juego" in Spanish. Thanks to an alliance between Al Jazeera and Mediapro, beIN Sports Spain offers UEFA Champions League (2015–2018), UEFA Europa League (2015–2018), UEFA Super Cup (2015–2017), Premier League (2015–16 season only), Serie A, Primeira Liga, Jupiler Pro League, Ligue 1, DFB Pokal, Coupe de la Ligue, KNVB Beker, Johan Cruijff Shield, Copa de Brasil, CONCACAF Gold Cup, Copa Libertadores and Copa Sudamericana. beIN Sports Spain can be viewed over the Internet, smart TV (LG and Samsung), PC, laptops, tablets, Smartphones (iOS/Android), PS3/PS4, Chromecast, TV Operators (Orange, Vodafone and Telecable) and online platforms (beIN Sports Connect, Total Channel and YouTube). On Wednesday August 19, due to the start of the playoffs of the UEFA Champions League, beIN Sports (Spain) begins to emit beIN Sports MAX (up to 8 simultaneous channels) to broadcast all matches of the UEFA Champions League and UEFA Europa League.

beIN Sports (Spain) developed a channel licensed for bars in Spain called "beIN Sports BAR". The channel stopped transmission on 9 August 2018.

For the 2016–2017 season and onwards, beIN Sports Spain has the television rights to La Liga (eight games a day, always one of Real Madrid or FC Barcelona) and Copa del Rey.

In 2015, beIN Sports expanded its global footprint by acquiring Digiturk, a Turkish-pay-TV platform, which added millions of subscribers to its audience. This move positioned the network as a leader in both European and Asian markets. By 2024, beIN Sports achieved a major milestone, attracting over 1.2 billion views for its coverage of the UEFA Euro 2024 tournament, setting a new standard for sports broadcasting globally (beIN Sports, 2024). The network also embraced digital innovation, offering subscribers access to live and on-demand content through the beIN CONNECT platform, thus enhancing its accessibility and user engagement (Al-Obaidly, 2019).

On November 1, 2017, beIN Sports created an Olympic Channel in the Middle East and North Africa region.

beIN Sports was firstly launched in Singapore through Starhub TV Channel 213 on 19 April 2016. beIN Sports was briefly launched on Singtel TV Channel 109 from 6 August 2019 to 2 October 2021. The latter was then returned on 11 March 2022 due to the closure for Fox Sports Asia. beIN Sports 1 though 3 for Singtel TV are now located on Channel 126, 127 and 128 respectively.

CEO Yousef Al-Obaidly

beIN Sports launched on Malaysia Astro Channel 837 on 1 August 2016 before the channel was relocated to Channel 818 on 1 August 2019 and then to Channel 820 on 17 October 2024. The channel was also launched on Unifi TV on 1 May 2022.

beIN Sports MAX, which mostly aired UEFA Champions and Europa League, launched on Singtel TV on Channel 110 on 19 October 2018. It also launched on Astro on Channel 841 on 4 December 2018 before it was relocate to Channel 819 on 1 August 2019. On 7 January 2022, beIN Sports Max was rebranded to beIN Sports 3 in Malaysia and Singapore.

In France, where beIN Sports was launched for the first time, it holds the rights to broadcast major football tournaments, including Ligue 1, La Liga, Serie A, Bundesliga and the European Football Championship. Along with Canal+, beIN Sports also holds the rights to broadcast all the Champions League matches from 2021 to 2024.

In the United States and Canada, beIN Sports holds the rights to broadcast La Liga, Ligue 1, CONMEBOL World Cup Qualifiers, Copa Libertadores and Football League Championship matches and Real Madrid TV. It launched two channels in the United States (English and Spanish), in August 2012, followed by a full channel in Canada, on 31 January 2014.

In Indonesia, beIN Sports holds the rights to broadcast La Liga, Ligue 1, Serie A (2013–2016, return in 2018), Süper Lig (2017–18 until 2021–22), A-League (starts 2017–18 season), FFA Cup (starts 2017 season), CAF World Cup Qualifiers, Major League Soccer (MLS), and more. In Malaysia, beIN Sports offers comprehensive coverage of European Football Leagues including La Liga, Ligue 1 and more.

In Hong Kong, beIN Sports holds the rights to broadcast Serie A, Ligue 1, Major League Soccer (MLS), A-League (starts 2017–18 season), FFA Cup (starts 2017 season), UEFA Champions League, UEFA Europa League and more.

In Thailand, beIN Sports holds the rights to broadcast La Liga, Serie A (2013–2016, return in 2018), Ligue 1, Bundesliga, MLS (until 2022), Süper Lig (2017–18 until 2021–22), A-League (starts 2017–18 season), FFA Cup (starts 2017 season), UEFA Champions League, UEFA Europa League and more.

In Australia, the channel was launched in late November 2014, following the acquisition of Setanta Sports Australia which was rebranded as beIN Sports. beIN Sports Australia holds the rights to broadcast UEFA Champions League (2015–2018), UEFA Europa League (2015–2018), EFL Cup, La Liga, Serie A, Ligue 1, Bundesliga, MLS, Copa Libertadores and RBS Six Nations. On 14 March 2016, beIN Sports Australia expanded from one to three channels, all in HD, and as of 15 May 2016 has been made available to all Foxtel sport pack subscribers, rather than the original add-on cost for a single SD channel. Fetch subscribers still only have access to beIN Sports 1, which is an add-on cost each month.

beIN Connect, also known as beIN Sports Connect, is a subsidiary over-the-top content (OTT) service started in 2014. It allows users to watch live and on-demand video content from a Mac, Windows PC, mobile phone, Xbox 360, Xbox One, PlayStation 3 or PlayStation 4 via a broadband or Wi-Fi internet connection. On-demand content comprises sports highlights, movies, and TV shows. beIN CONNECT is available as a paid service in France, Spain, United States, Canada, Turkey (in 2017), Asia-Pacific (in 2017) and the MENA region.

== Programming ==
=== Football ===
==== FIFA World Cup ====
From 2014 to 2017, beIN Sports held the rights to broadcast the 2014 FIFA World Cup. In 2018, beIN Sports broadcast the 2018 FIFA World Cup. On 23 February 2020, beIN Sports announced to broadcast special shows and dedicated programs for 1000 days until the 2022 FIFA World Cup. To be broadcast from February 25 on its free-to-air and HD1 channel, the programs were supposed to include historic matches, highlights from the international best players, history of Qatari football and special clips of the day Qatar won the World Cup bid.

==== UEFA Euro ====
From 2012 to 2015, the network held the rights to broadcast all UEFA Euro 2012. From 2016 to 2021, beIN Sports broadcast Euro 2016 matches on the French pay-TV platform while TF1 and M6 have the free-to-air rights to select matches.

==== Champions League ====
On November 23, 2019, Canal+, beIN Sports, Fox Sports, TVE, Antena 4 and Sports 2 won the rights to broadcast Champions League matches On France, Spain, Uk, Canada and Latin America between 2021 and 2024.

==== Ligue 1 ====
In France, beIN Sports holds one of five rights packages for Ligue 1 from 2012 to 2016 – the package consisting of Friday night and Sunday evening matches. The other four packages are held by Canal+. It also shows Ligue 2 matches. For the UEFA Champions League, it has the rights to broadcast all matches except the 13 weekly first-choice picks (yet to be awarded to any broadcaster as of April 2012) from 2012. It also owns the rights to all UEFA Europa League matches including the final.

On France, Spain, Russian and United States beIN Sports and Canal+ also share the rights to Serie A and Bundesliga matches. It also airs FA Cup, Football League Championship, La Liga, Argentine Primera División and Brasileirao. In the United States, the network holds the rights package for Ligue 1, La Liga, FIFA World Cup qualification rounds in the Americas (CONMEBOL and CONCACAF), except for home matches by Mexico and the United States (which are both held by Univision and ESPN). In April 2020, beIN Sports announced that it will broadcast a month-long online football gaming tournament organized by Paris Saint-Germain to entertain people stuck at home, due to Coronavirus. On 13 February 2021, beIN Sports secured exclusive domestic broadcast rights from Canal+ for the remaining matches of Ligue 2's 2020/21 season. BeIN already had the rights to broadcast two live matches per match week under its existing €30 million per season deal with the French Professional Football League (LFP) for the 2020-24 cycle. With this sublicensing deal, beIN can air the remaining eight live matches per week until the end of 2020-21 season.

==== Ligue 2 ====
On 26 June 2024, all matches of Ligue 2 will be broadcast in Bein Sports from 2024–25 to 2028–29.

==== Stars League ====
beIN Sports held the rights to broadcast the seasons of Qatar Stars League.

==== Süper Lig ====
On December 27, 2017, beIN Sports bought the broadcasting rights of the Turkish Süper Lig until 2027.

==== SPFL ====
BeIN shows live Premiership games.

=== Rugby ===
==== Rugby union ====
On France, Spain and Latin America beIN Sports broadcasts November test matches, European Rugby Champions Cup, European Rugby Challenge Cup, English Premiership and Pro14.

==== Rugby league ====
beIN Sports will broadcast the Super League including all home matches of French side Catalans Dragons. Other competitions include the Australian National Rugby League and State of Origin series.

beIN Sports was awarded the rights to the 2013 Rugby League World Cup and broadcast all matches live.

=== Cricket ===
In 2017, cricket debuted on the channel. BeIN Sports has acquired the Cricket Australia and England and Wales Cricket Board rights for the Middle East and North Africa (MENA) region, and broadcast the 2017–18 Ashes series and 2017–18 Big Bash League season.

==== Indian Premier League ====
BeIN Sports also acquired the Indian Premier League (IPL) rights in April 2018 for the Middle East and North Africa (MENA) region in a five-year deal with Star India up to 2022.

==== Pakistan Super League ====
On early December 31, 2024, beIN Sports held the rights to broadcast the 2024 Pakistan Super League.

=== Motorsports ===
On 23 February 2013, as part of Al-Jazeera's increasing footprint in the Superbike World Championship, which they hold rights in the Middle East, and the transitional shutdown of Fox Sports motorsport operations in Charlotte, North Carolina, beIN Sports acquired the rights to the Superbike World Championship in the United States, which also includes live coverage of the races and also the support classes, which had never been televised in the United States in the past.

beIN Sports also airs the FIA World Rallycross Championship in the United States, the Middle East, and North Africa.

In 2016, beIN Sports began to broadcast two more Dorna-controlled motorcycle road racing series in the United States and Canada -- MotoGP, the Superbike World Championship, giving them control of FIM road racing on North American television. The deal ended after the 2019. The channel also aired MotoAmerica from 2016 to 2017.

==== Formula One ====
From 2014 to 2018, they had broadcast rights for the MENA, Spain and UK region. However, in February 2019, beIN Sports, citing market conditions, declined to renew rights, and, until February 2024, the rights were instead given to MBC Action, whose parent company Middle East Broadcasting Center is majority-owned by the Saudi government. In early 2023, beIN Sports got the rights to broadcast the Formula One in southeast Asia from 2023 to 2028, and, in February 2024, reacquired rights for the MENA region as well as Turkey, which runs through 2033.

=== Team handball ===
beIN Sports has acquired exclusive broadcast rights to the EHF Champions League (Team Handball). The EHF Champions League is the most important club competition for men's and women's teams in Europe and involves the leading teams from the top European nations.

In January 2013, beIN Sports also acquired the broadcast rights to the 2013 World Men's Handball Championship. beIN Sports USA aired live, delayed and pre-recorded HD games in the US, between January 11–27, 2013.

=== Basketball ===
Basketball programming on beIN Sports has gained prominence with exclusive coverage of the NBA and Euroleague games. The network also highlights basketball's growing popularity in the MENA region, where events like the annual NBA Abu Dhabi Games have become a major attraction, which draw fans from across the globe (Baraheni, 2024). Expert commentators like Eric Micoud guarantee that both seasoned fans and newcomers gain valuable insights into the games (Sim, 2024).

=== Tennis ===
In France, beIN Sports previously aired the Wimbledon Championships, Davis Cup and Fed Cup. In 2026, beIN signed a contract to regain the ATP Tour rights starting in 2028, including ATP World Tour Masters 1000, ATP World Tour 500 and ATP World Tour Finals.

beIN Sports will be the exclusive broadcaster of WTA Tour in the United States, Australia, the Middle East, and North Africa from 2017 to 2021 and then returned to 2024 to 2031 with Turkey was added it rights.

=== Other sports ===
In France, beIN Sports aired the 2012 Summer Olympics tennis, handball and basketball tournaments. In athletics, beIN Sports airs the IAAF Diamond League and several international marathons and World Indoor Meetings. In cycling, it broadcasts some UCI World Tour road races, including the Giro d'Italia, as well as the UCI Road, Track, Mountain Bike and Trials World Championships ("Mountain Bike Mania," 2016-2018). The channel also airs the French Handball Championship, FIVB World League, EuroLeague (top-tier European basketball club competition), National Basketball Association (NBA), National Football League (NFL), and Major League Baseball (MLB).

On 25 May 2016, the U.S. beIN Sports announced that it had acquired partial rights to Conference USA college sports, including a package of selected college football, basketball, baseball, softball, and soccer matches. The deal marks the first American football-related contract the U.S. network has acquired.

On 20 April 2018, professional wrestling debuted on the channel with the premiere of Major League Wrestling's weekly series, MLW Fusion, on beIN Sports USA.

==== Football broadcasters ====
The channel's football coverage has notably been fronted by Richard Keys and Andy Gray since 2013, after their career in British television was upended in 2011 due to a scandal involving sexist comments. In early February 2026 news broke that Keys and Gary are expected to leave beIN at the end of the current Premier League season. They departed at the conclusion of the UEFA Champions League Final in May.

Name	Role	Note
Kaylyn Kyle	Anchor	Presenter of English Premier League Football & Champions League Football
Didier Domi	Analyst	Analyst of English Premier League & Champions League Football
Aarran Summers	Anchor	Presenter of UEFA Champions League, UEFA Europa League and English Premier League Football
Nicola Crosby	Anchor	Former Presenter of English Premier League Football
Andy Kerr	Reporter	Reporter of English Premier League Football

== Football coverage ==
Name	Role	Note
Darren Tulett	Presenter	Host of Sports Night
Jean-Pierre Papin	Pundit	Le Club pundit
Robert Pires	Pundit	Le Club pundit
Patrick Vieira	Pundit	Le Club pundit
Luis Fernandez	Pundit	Le Club pundit
Sonny Anderson	Pundit	Le Club pundit
Ludovic Giuly	Pundit	Le Club pundit
Éric Di Meco	Commentator	Ligue 1 and UEFA Champions League co-commentator
Patrice Ferri	Commentator	Ligue 1, FA Cup, Football League Cup, UEFA Champions League and UEFA Europa League co-commentator
Bruno Cheyrou	Commentator	Ligue 1, Serie A, Coppa Italia, UEFA Champions League and UEFA Europa League co-commentator
Omar Da Fonseca	Commentator	La Liga, Copa del Rey, UEFA Champions League and UEFA Europa League co-commentator
Jean-Alain Boumsong	Commentator	Ligue 1, Ligue 2, UEFA Champions League and UEFA Europa League co-commentator
Brahim Thiam	Commentator	Ligue 1 and UEFA Europa League co-commentator
Gernot Rohr	Commentator	Bundesliga co-commentator
Thomas Rongen	Commentator	Ligue 1 and CONMEBOL Recopa Sudamericana color commentator
Gary Bailey	Commentator	La Liga and Ligue 1 color commentator
Kaylyn Kyle	Commentator	La Liga and Ligue 1 color commentator
Terri Leigh	Presenter	Host of The Express
Hamad Jassim	Presenter	Presenter of BeIN Sports News
Andy Gray	Analyst	Co-presenter of English Premier League Football
Gaizka Mendieta	Commentator and Pundit	Xtra Champions League (Valencia playoffs UEFA Champions League).
Andoni Zubizarreta	Pundit and commentator	Pundit in El Club and commentator in UEFA Champions League matches.
Jorge Valdano	Pundit and commentator	Pundit in El Club and commentator in UEFA Champions League matches.
Alberto Edjogo-Owono	Pundit	Pundit in El Club.
Neymar	special guest	Special guest in El Club.
Eric Abidal	Pundit	Pundit in Xtra Highlights and El Club.
César Sánchez	Pundit	Pundit in El Club.
Thomas Jenkins	Pundit	Pundit in El Club.

== Basketball coverage ==
Name	Role	Additional Info
Éric Micoud	Commentator	NBA and Euroleague co-commentator

== Tennis coverage ==
Name	Role	Additional Info
Fabrice Santoro	Commentator	Wimbledon, ATP World Tour Finals, Masters 1000 and 500 series co-commentator
Tatiana Golovin	Commentator	Wimbledon, ATP World Tour Finals, Masters 1000 and 500 series co-commentator
Sébastien Grosjean	Commentator	Wimbledon, ATP World Tour Finals, Masters 1000 and 500 series co-commentator

== Handball coverage ==
Name	Role	Additional Info
Olivier Girault	Commentator	EHF Champions League co-commentator
Véronique Pecqueux-Rolland	Commentator	EHF Women's Champions League co-commentator

== Rugby coverage ==
Name	Role	Additional Info
Éric Bonneval	Commentator	Test match, English Premiership and Pro14 co-commentator
Dimitri Yachvili	Commentator	Test match co-commentator
Benjamin Boyet	Commentator	Test match co-commentator

== Digital Innovation ==
beIN Sports has heavily invested in digital platforms to expand its reach. The beIN CONNECT platform enables subscribers to stream live and on-demand content across multiple devices, including smartphones, tablets, and smart TVs. During UEFA Euro 2024, beIN CONNECT recorded over 1.2 billion views, showcasing the platform's ability to engage a global audience at scale (BeIN Sports, 2024). By leveraging advanced technologies, the network personalizes recommendations and ensures high-quality viewing experiences, keeping pace with evolving viewer expectations (Sim, 2024).

== Distribution ==
=== Indonesia & Philippines ===
==== Current channels ====
beIN Sports 1 HD broadcasts year-round live football with the Premier League (2013–2019) being prominent as well as content from Arsenal, Liverpool, and Spurs club channels in streaming media. Other live coverage will come from the Serie A (2013–2021 exclude 2016–2018), Ligue 1, Major League Soccer (MLS), the Brazilian national leagues (Paulistao & Brasileirão) (2013–2015), as well as major cup tournaments such as the FA Cup (2013–2024), Coppa Italia (2013 and 2014), and the Coupe de la Ligue. Other sports are broadcasting on that channel including Formula One (since 2023), and the World Rally Championship. In 2014, beIN Sports was pulled from First Media due to carriage fee concern and this channel was removed from Transvision in 2016. However, MNC Vision just carries this channel from 2016 until 2022 and then returned from 17 September 2024 as UEFA Champions League rights has returned into the channel in Indonesia after 2015–18 seasons.

From 2016, this channel also broadcast not only football but other sporting events, such as: Tennis, Handball, and many more.

beIN Sports 2 HD will also feature live football but will have another sports remit. Starting January 2022, beIN Sports 2 will begin airing tennis coverages as the latter acquired broadcast rights of the Australian Open, the French Open and the ATP tours.

beIN Sports 3 HD same as the beIN Sports 2 HD. This channel has been launched since August 2016, replacing the Premier League channel.

==== Former channel ====
Premier League HD will be a 24-hour Premier League-dedicated channel in Indonesia broadcasting nearly 1,600 hours of live programming from 2013–14 to 2015–16 season. This includes all 380 Premier League matches per season, weekly magazine show Premier League World, as well as pre-match coverage and post-game analysis in addition to weekly preview and review shows and highlights in interviews.

=== Canada ===
Despite most of its North American broadcast rights contracts covering both the United States and Canada, beIN Sports initially was not authorized to broadcast in the country nor had it sub-licensed any of its programmings to local broadcasters. The channel had a difficult time finding a broadcaster willing to partner up with it to launch its services. In October 2013, beIN Sports launched an online streaming service in Canada through their website www.beINsportsplay.ca. The live service was available at no charge for registered users until 1 February 2014; since then, users can access the streams for CAD$19.99 per month. On-demand coverage is not available through beIN Sports Play Canada.

On 18 December 2013, beIN Sports announced they had reached a deal with Ethnic Channels Group, a local ethnic broadcaster, to launch their services in Canada. The channel was officially launched on 31 January 2014 via MTS and NEXTV.

beIN Sports HD is available on Shaw Cable on channel 234, Rogers Cable on channel 391, on Bell Satellite & Fibe on channel 1412, on Videotron on channel 797 and through OTT broadcaster DAZN.

Moreover, beIN Sports entered the market through partnerships with local providers such as Ethnic Channels Group and digital platforms like DAZN. The availability of the beIN CONNECT platform has further expanded its accessibility, which offers flexible viewing options for subscribers (Chee, 2023).

=== France ===
In July 2018, beIN Sports struck a multi-million rights deal with French sports agency, Amaury Sport Organisation (ASO), granting it the sole rights in MENA to broadcast all its major events until 2023. But in April 2019, ASO confirmed that one its major event, Dakar Rally would be held in Saudi Arabia from 2020 under a multi-year accord. Following which, beIN said that ASO was trying to exit its MENA deal and instead making a transition towards Saudi broadcaster. However, in October 2019, the president of the Nanterre Commercial Court in France ruled that ASO must continue to maintain its five-year exclusive rights agreement with beIN.

beIN Sports has partnered with the Amaury Sport Organization (ASO) to broadcast exclusive events like the Dakar Rally, further diversifying its sports portfolio and appealing to motorsport fans (Al-Obaidly, 2019).

== Controversies ==
=== Market position ===
beIN Sports' market positions in not important regions have led to concerns over the network's dominance. In 2016, French authorities blocked a deal by beIN Sports France to sub-license its sports properties to Canal+ Sport, as it would have given the partnership control of 80% of French sports media rights. At the 2017 World Men's Handball Championship, whose international media rights were owned by beIN Sports, French radio stations declined to air the tournament as beIN Sports wanted them to pay administrative fees about five times higher than technical cost, in violation of French law. The 2017 Africa Cup of Nations were also left without domestic television coverage in four countries participating in the tournament – Algeria, Egypt, Morocco, and Tunisia – due to exorbitant sublicensing fees being demanded from free-to-air broadcasters by beIN as the region's rightsholder.

In August 2018, beIN Sports was fined, and subsequently banned from operating in Saudi Arabia, with the government citing its forced bundling of the networks with unrelated services. beIN criticised the actions as being politically-motivated. The following March, beIN's rights to the Asian Football Confederation (AFC) were stripped in Saudi Arabia to "cancel" its monopoly on the sport, due to the "illegality of BeIN Sport [sic] to transmit in the Kingdom due to the grave violations of the laws and regulations BeIN Sport has committed", and "its inability to obtain the required licenses necessary for it to fulfil its commitments in transmitting AFC's competitions to the viewers and followers in the Kingdom". beIN threatened legal action, accusing the AFC of colluding with the Saudi Arabian Football Federation to breach its contract.

By contrast, beIN Sports' relatively niche position in the United States (where it focuses particularly on international sports not picked up by other networks) led to criticism of its broadcasting deal with the WTA Tour for non-domestic events, as the channel's prioritisation of football in its scheduling, narrower carriage than its previous broadcaster Tennis Channel, as well as being dropped by several major cable providers in 2018, limited the availability of its coverage. These issues led to concerns that the limited coverage would give women's tennis little exposure outside of majors and domestic tour events. beIN Sports U.S. dropped the WTA Tour after the 2018 season, and it subsequently signed a new contract to return to Tennis Channel in the 2019 season.

In April 2020, amidst claims of Saudi PIF taking over Premier League club Newcastle United, beIN Sports wrote a letter to league's chief executive Richard Masters and issued a notice to 19 clubs, except Newcastle. In its letter, the broadcaster claimed that Saudi Arabian pay TV network beoutQ, has been illicitly regulating its copyright protected content and demanded Premier League to block the deal. "Given the crippling economic effect that coronavirus is having on the sports industry, this is all happening at a time when football clubs need to protect their broadcast revenue the most," BeIN chief executive Yousef al-Obaidly wrote.

beIN has unveiled its new streaming service for the MENA region.

=== Piracy ===
==== Premier League rights ====
In 2014, the Premier League restricted beIN Sports in the MENA region to airing one match per-week with a 3:00 p.m. UK time kickoff on television only. As these matches may not be broadcast within the United Kingdom due to domestic rights restrictions, the Premier League showed concerns that beIN was not taking adequate steps to prevent its streaming broadcasts from being used for unauthorized retransmissions, especially into the United Kingdom. In November 2014, the Premier League reinstated beIN's full access to 3 p.m. fixtures.

In 2020, the company wrote to Premier League clubs to warn them against agreeing to a takeover deal with a Saudi-led consortium for Newcastle United, because of Saudi backing for the "theft" of BeIN transmissions by the Saudi broadcaster beoutQ. The Premier League board has currently allowed the deal to go through.

==== beoutQ ====
Due to the then-ongoing diplomatic crisis between Qatar and other Arab countries, beIN has been restricted from doing business in Saudi Arabia and the UAE since June 2017. The UAE un-banned the MENA network a month later, with no progress from Saudi Arabia reported. Months later in August 2018, it was revealed the Saudi pirate broadcaster, beoutQ, has been pirating the networks' programming in the region for over a year, which has faced criticism from beIN and rightsholders over its "industrial-scale" copyright infringement. However, no law firm in Saudi Arabia was reportedly willing to represent the rightsholders in Saudi courts. Nor was the Saudi-majority owned ArabSat reported of responding to takedown pleas against beoutQ. In August 2019, the operations were eventually taken off-air. However, in November of same year, beIN Media alerted that despite ceasing satellite transmissions in mid-August, pirate broadcast operation, beoutQ, was still distributing its copyrighted content via the IPTV function of set-top boxes. beIN Media's licence in Saudi Arabia was permanently revoked by Saudi authorities in July 2020 under the charges of antitrust practices following the World Trade Organization ruling the prior month concluding that Saudi Arabia didn't take any noticeable action in stopping beoutQ, and to the contrary, harboured and sponsored its operations. beIN Media says that even after the signing of al-'Ula Declaration in early January 2021, Saudi Arabia is yet to reverse its decision to ban its operations in the national market.

However, on 6 October 2021, beIN media group said in a statement that Saudi Arabia will soon lift a four year ban on the channel and close its pirate websites, only beIN holds the rights to broadcast the Premier League across the Middle East.

==== Italian football coverage rights ====
In November 2019, beIN Sports announced that it was reviewing its partnership with Serie A and considering cancelling all of its agreements in Italian football, following the league's decision to play a Supercoppa Italiana match between Juventus and Lazio in Saudi Arabia, despite piracy concerns. "It is remarkable what Serie A is seemingly prepared to jeopardize, not only all the financial revenues from one of its biggest broadcaster partners, but also the exposure beIN gives to the league in markets all around the world," a statement from the television network read.

In matchweek 27 of 2019–20 season, other countries (exc. NZ), viewers were treated instead to a Turkish Süper Lig match between Denizlispor and Besiktas. And a late-night trawl through beIN Sports website for all of Saturday's results suggested there weren't any games played in Italy—just England, Spain, France and Germany. For the record, Torino and Parma drew 1-1.

But in matchweek 28, beIN Sports social medias apologizes to all global viewers and announced the comeback coverage.

beIN paid $500 million to broadcast Serie A from 2018 to 2021, an agreement that has been beset by snags. It claims strong backing from competitions including England's Premier League, Spain's La Liga and the Wimbledon tennis championships, as part of a long-running campaign against its sports rights being pirated in Saudi Arabia.

== See also ==
- beIN Media Group
- beIN Sports
  - MENA
  - USA
  - Canada
  - Australia
  - France
  - Turkey
