= Baraem =

Qatari children's television channel

Baraem براعم
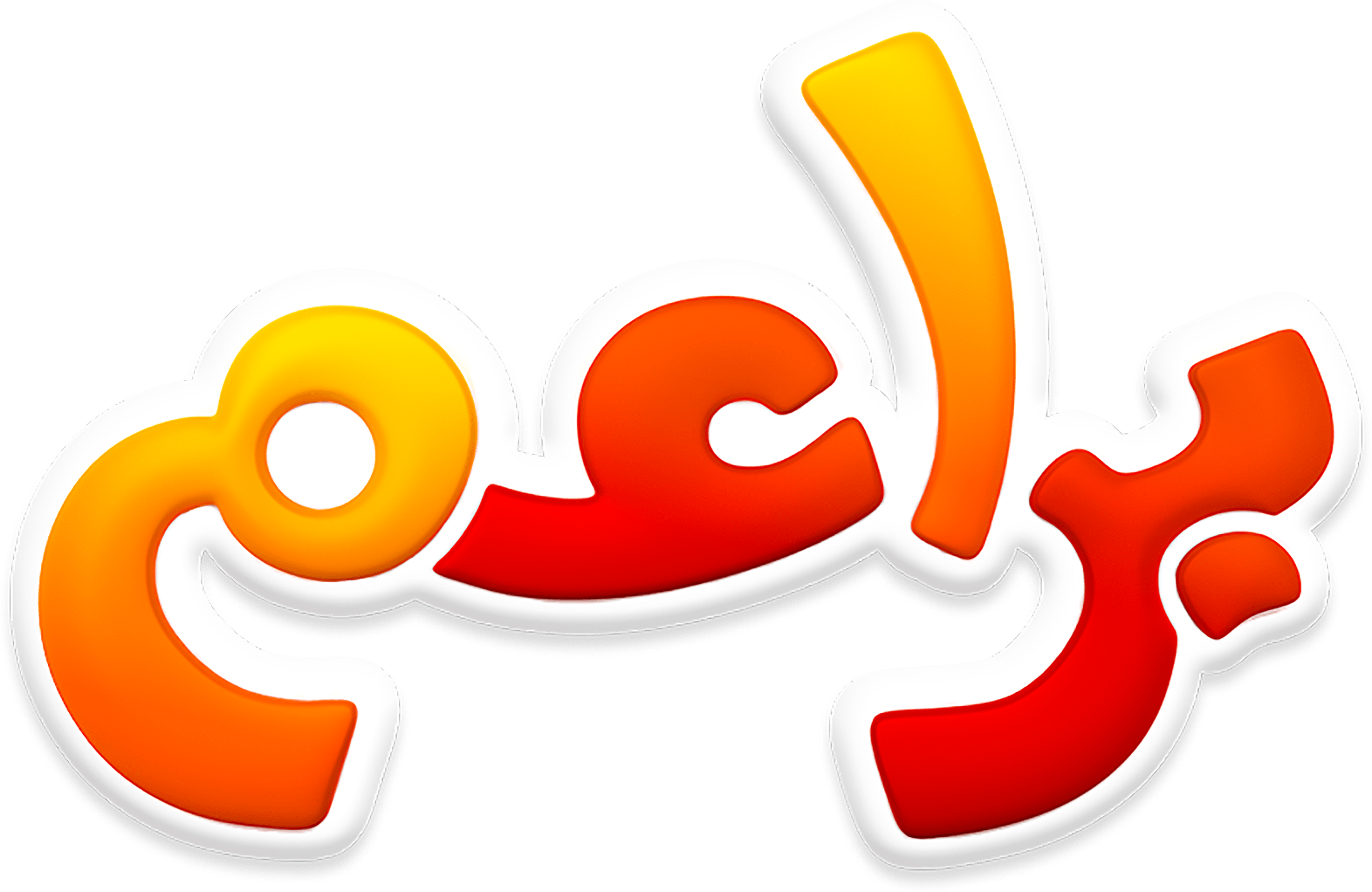
- Logo used since 2017
- Country: Qatar
- Broadcast area: Middle East and North Africa; Europe (formerly)
- Headquarters: Doha, Qatar

Programming
- Language: Arabic (Modern Standard)
- Picture format: 576p (2009–2011); 720p (2011–present); 1080p (downscaled to 576i for the SD feed; 2016–present)

Ownership
- Owner: Al Jazeera Media Network (2009–2016); Qatar Foundation (2009–2013) beIN Media Group (2016–present)
- Sister channels: Jeem TV

History
- Launched: 16 January 2009; 17 years ago (MENA feeds); 1 November 2012 (European feed); 1 April 2016 (switch to pay television)
- Closed: 1 April 2016 (free to air feeds); 1 June 2018 (European feed)

Links
- Website: baraem.tv

Baraem TV (Arabic: براعم) (meaning: buds) is a Qatari pay television channel. It was launched on 16 January 2009. It is directed to children aged between 2 and 6 years old, and calls itself "the first pan-Arabic preschool channel". Previously co-owned by Al Jazeera Media Network and the Qatar Foundation, Al Jazeera acquired full rights to the channel in June 2013. It was then acquired by beIN Media Group on 1 April 2016.

Programming for older children is broadcast on sister channel Jeem TV.

== History ==
The channel was launched on 16 January 2009 as a joint venture between the Qatar Foundation (who owned 90% of the channel) and Al Jazeera Media Network (who owned the remaining 10%). Its on air look was designed by Radiant Studios, who also designed the new on air look for Al Jazeera Children's Channel that debuted the same day. In line with its launch, Baraem absorbed JCC's pre-school programming.

Moza bint Nasser al-Misnad, wife of then-Emir of Qatar Hamad bin Khalifa Al Thani, mother of current Emir Tamim bin Hamad Al Thani and leader of the Qatar foundation, was given credit for the channel having stemmed from her "full vision", and for it launching "under her patronage".

A European feed of both JCC and Baraem launched on 1 November 2012.

On 15 June 2013, it was announced that Al Jazeera would acquire the Qatar Foundation's assets to both JeemTV and Baraem.

On 1 April 2016, the channel was acquired by beIN Channels Network alongside JeemTV.

On 1 January 2017, the channel received a rebrand to coincide with its 8th anniversary. This time the new look was designed in-house.

== Broadcast ==
In September 2011, the channel started broadcasting in 16:9 aspect ratio.

From 2009 until 1 April 2016, the channel was free to view on Nilesat, Arabsat, Hot Bird, and Eurobird, and since then it was exclusive to beIN Channels Network and it closed in part of North Africa and Europe. However the Hot Bird feed remained free to view until 1 June 2018.

Baraem is broadcast mainly in Qatar, but also have feeds in South Africa, Egypt, Morocco, Saudi Arabia, United Arab Emirates, Jordan, Iran, Lebanon, and Syria. They also have a feed in the United States that is an Xfinity-exclusive via Flex.
