= BeIN Series (Middle East TV channel) =

beIN Series MENA
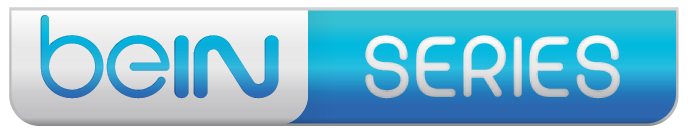
- Logo of the channel starting 2017
- Country: Qatar
- Broadcast area: Middle East and North Africa
- Network: beIN Channels Network
- Headquarters: Doha, Qatar

Programming
- Languages: Arabic; English
- Picture format: 1080p MPEG-4 HDTV

Ownership
- Owner: beIN Media Group
- Sister channels: beIN Series Turkey beIN Sports beIN Max beIN Movies beJunior

History
- Launched: 1 November 2016; 9 years ago

Links
- Website: www.bein.com

Availability

Streaming media
- beIN Connect: beIN Connect International
- beIN Connect (Turkey): Dilediğin Yerde Uygulaması

beIN Series is a set of television networks launched on 1 November 2016, owned by beIN Media Group and broadcast on beIN direct-broadcast satellite services in the MENA region, and in Turkey through the Digiturk system, which beIN purchased in 2015 and rebranded as beIN Series on 13 January 2016. The networks feature mainly one-hour drama and dramedy series.

The networks of beIN Series license content from American production companies, including ABC Studios, Warner Bros. Television and Sony Pictures Television. Series on the network are dubbed or subtitled with Arabic or Turkish, depending on the region.

== History ==
In 2016, the company had launched a children's channel called CBeebies and in July of the same year had signed a deal with the AMC Networks International to broadcast The Terror, The Night Manager and Fear the Walking Dead.

In 2017, beIN Series had signed a contract with CBS Studios International and The CW which will allow the company to air such series as MacGyver and Bull, while CBS All-Access will provide beIN with The Good Fight and The Late Late Show with James Corden. The same year, the company had signed a deal with Eccho Rights to air New Bride, Winter Sun and Heart of the City on its beIN Drama HD1 channel.

In 2018, the channel had partnered with BBC Studios to broadcast BBC Earth and children's channel CBeebies through Digiturk.
