= Jeem TV =

Qatari children's television channel

JeemTV تلفزيون جيم
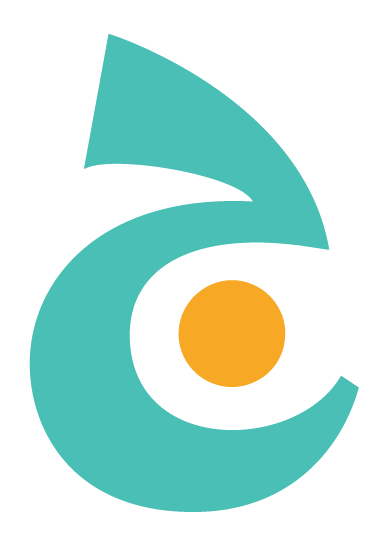
- Logo used since 2013
- Broadcast area: Middle East and North Africa; Europe (formerly); United States
- Headquarters: Doha, Qatar

Programming
- Language: Arabic (Modern Standard)
- Picture format: 576p (2005–2011); 720p (2011–present); 1080p (downscaled to 576i for the SD feed; 2016–present)

Ownership
- Owner: Al Jazeera Media Network (2005–2016); Qatar Foundation (2005–2013) beIN Media Group (2016–present)
- Sister channels: Baraem

History
- Launched: 9 September 2005; 21 years ago as al Jazeera's Children Channel (JCC); 1 November 2012 (European feed); 29 March 2013 (as JeemTV); 1 April 2016 (switch to pay television)
- Closed: 29 March 2013 (as al Jazeera's Children Channel) (JCC); 1 April 2016 (free-to-air feeds); 1 June 2018 (European feed)
- Former names: Al Jazeera Children's Channel (2005–2013)

Links
- Website: www.jeemtv.net jcctv.net (archived)

JeemTV (Arabic: تلفزيون جيم, also stylised as تلفزيون ج), formerly known as Al Jazeera Children's Channel (abbreviated as JCC, Arabic: قناة الجزيرة للأطفال), is a Qatari Arabic-language pay television (formerly free-to-air until 2016) channel, aimed at children between the ages of 6 and 12. It was previously co-owned by Al Jazeera Media Network and the Qatar Foundation from launch until June 2013, when Al Jazeera fully acquired the channel. It was then acquired by beIN Media Group on 1 April 2016.

Programming for younger children is broadcast on sister channel Baraem

== History ==
=== Al Jazeera Children's Channel ===
Al Jazeera Children's Channel قناة الجزيرة للأطفال
- Logo used 2009–2013
- Broadcast area: Middle East and North Africa
- Headquarters: Doha, Qatar

Programming
- Language: Arabic (Modern Standard)
- Picture format: 576p (2005–2011); 720p (2011–2013)

Ownership
- Owner: Al Jazeera Media Network; Qatar Foundation
- Sister channels: Baraem

History
- Launched: 9 September 2005; 21 years ago
- Closed: 29 March 2013; 13 years ago
- Replaced by: Jeem TV

The channel was launched as JCC on 9 September 2005 as a joint venture between the Qatar Foundation (who owned 90% of the channel) and Al Jazeera Media Network (who owned the remaining 10%). In 2006, S4C sold two of its series (Y Meees and Sali Mali) to the channel.

The channel became an associate member of the European Broadcasting Union in 2008.

The channel launched on Sky Digital in the UK on 18 March 2008.

The first major rebrand for JCC happened on 16 January 2009, coinciding with the launch of sister channel Baraem. The targeted age demographic was changed from 3–14 to 7–14 as a result of the launch of the latter.

A European feed launched on 1 November 2012.

In February 2013, a new look for JCC was announced on social media. Along with that, a new website (whatisthedot.net, now redirects to jeemtv.net) was created detailing the new look; it was originally supposed to launch on March 1st, but was delayed. Finally, on 29 March 2013 at 5:00 PM Doha time, JCC was rebranded as JeemTV. The word "Jeem" is a reference to the letter ج in the Arabic alphabet. It is depicted in the logo. Another change with this relaunch is the targeted age demographic, which was changed from 7–14 to 7–12.

On 15 June 2013, three months after the rebranding to JeemTV, Al Jazeera announced the acquisition of the Qatar Foundation's assets of the channel; it has maintained full ownership of the channel since then.

On 1 April 2016, JeemTV and Baraem on Arabsat and Nilesat both became encrypted in favor of HD feeds available exclusively via the beIN Channels Network service.

The European feed on Freeview UK closed on 1 June 2018.

== Programming ==
Programming aired on the channel includes debate shows, educational programs covering themes such as science, technology and sports, quizzes and game-shows, documentaries, scripted live-action TV series, and animated TV series. The channel produces some of its own original TV series, such as My Arabian House, which premiered in 2007 and featured live action and puppetry. JeemTV also participates in co-productions with other public service children’s channels around the world. The remaining content consists of shows from the international market. Virtually all foreign-language material is translated into Arabic, primarily via dubbing (though voice-over is also used for unscripted programming).

JeemTV developed its multimedia program for learning and creativity with an interactive website. The website is bilingual in Arabic and English and provides more than 200 hours of educational and entertainment material. Members can also upload their images and videos and share them with other children around the world.

Since 16 January 2009, programming for the pre-school demographic between the ages of 3 and 6 is presented under the Baraem brand.

== Presentation ==
The initial on-air branding of the channel was designed by French design agency Gédéon.

Radiant Studios was responsible for the channel's rebranding on 16 January 2009, who also designed the on-air look for the newly launched sister channel, Baraem. London-based foundry Fontsmith revised the font used on air, giving it a much slimmer appearance, which was depicted in the new logo. The idents were animated by Seed Animation Studio, while the soundtrack used in the idents was composed by Mcasso.

The logo for JeemTV was designed by Tarek Atrissi, while its on-air look was made by Jump Design.

== Presenters ==
=== Current ===
- Ashraf Al-Awadi
- Jihane Arsanios
- Marwa Khamis
- Younes Al-Aaraj
- Imane Bakhach
- Anbar Anbarino (puppet mascot)
- Lahouh Lahouhino (puppet mascot)

=== Former ===
- Sahla Melki
- Mohammed Ali Bougma
- Hanan Ayari
- Asmahane Stella Tazi
- Mohammed Mezimez
- Ibrahim Al-Beshri
- Hassan Al-Mulla
- Rabii Az-Zain
- Nad the Robot (former CGI mascot)

== Broadcast ==
From launch to Summer 2007, JCC broadcast 18 hours a day on weekdays (6 am to 12 am Doha time) and 19 hours on weekends (6 am to 1 am). By the end of June 2007, JCC extends its broadcast time to 20 hours on weekdays (6 am to 2 am) and 21 hours on weekends (6 am to 3 am). With JCC's rebranding on 16 January 2009, the broadcast time was changed again, this time to 20 hours on both weekdays and weekends.

In September 2011, both JCC and Baraem started broadcasting in 16:9 aspect ratio in 720p resolution, coinciding with JCC's sixth anniversary.

In October 2012, the channel started broadcasting 24 hours a day.

JeemTV was free to view on Badr, Arabsat, Nilesat, Hotbird, Eurobird, and Freeview UK and was also distributed by a number of other operators across Europe. Although starting on 1 April 2016 it was made exclusive to beIN Channels Network, however, the Hot Bird feed remained free to view until 1 June 2018.

== See also ==
- Al Jazeera
- beIN
