= BeIN Sports (Turkish TV channel) =

Sports channel

beIN Sports
- Country: Turkey
- Broadcast area: Turkey
- Network: beIN Sports
- Headquarters: Istanbul, Turkey

Programming
- Languages: Turkish, English
- Picture format: 1080p, 16:9, MPEG-4, HDTV)

Ownership
- Owner: beIN Media Group
- Key people: Nasser Al-Khelaifi (Chairman); Yousef Al-Obaidly (CEO)
- Sister channels: beIN Sports MENA beIN Sports France beIN Sports USA beIN Sports Canada beIN Sports Australia beIN Sports Asia

History
- Launched: 4 September 2000; 26 years ago
- Former names: Işık TV (2000–2001); Lig TV (2001–2017)

Links
- Website: beinsports.com.tr

Availability

Terrestrial
- Digiturk: beIN Sports 1: Channel 77 beIN Sports 2: Channel 78 beIN Sports 3: Channel 79 beIN Sports 4: Channel 80 beIN Sports 5: Channel 81 beIN Sports Max 1: Channel 82 beIN Sports Max 2: Channel 83 beIN Sports Haber: Channel 85
- Türksat Kablo TV: beIN Sports Haber: Channel 223
- Türksat 4A: beIN Sports Haber (free)

Streaming media
- beIN Connect: beinconnect.com.tr
- TOD TV: todtv.com.tr

beIN Sports Turkey is a Turkish network of sports channels owned by beIN Media Group and operated by Digiturk. It is the Turkish version of the global sports network beIN Sports.

== History ==
The channel was originally acquired by Mehmet Emin Karamehmet in 2000 under the name Işık TV for the Digiturk platform. The following year, Karamehmet and Şansal Büyüka rebranded it as Lig TV. Following its acquisition by beIN Media Group, the network adopted its current name in 2017. As Turkey's first foreign-owned sports channel, it has held the exclusive domestic broadcasting rights for the Süper Lig since early 2001 and continues to broadcast on the Digiturk platform.

== Programming ==
=== Football ===
- FIFA Intercontinental Cup
- Turkey: Süper Lig, TFF First League
- England: Premier League
- France: Ligue 1, Ligue 2, Coupe de France,
- Portugal: Primeira Liga

=== Basketball ===
- Basketbol Süper Ligi

=== Tennis ===
- ATP
- WTA

=== Motorsport ===
- FOM (until 2033) : F1 (inc. both Academy (women) and kids), F2, F3, and Porsche Super Cup

=== Handball ===
- France: LNH Division 1

== Channels and their content ==
=== Bein Sports 1 ===
Only Turkish Süper Lig matches and certain football programs are broadcast. The channel broadcasts 24 hours a day. It can be watched on Digiturk channel 77.

=== Bein Sports 2 ===
Generally, overlapping Süper Lig and TFF 1. Lig matches are broadcast. Overlapping European matches are also aired on the channel. The channel broadcasts 24 hours a day and can be watched on Digiturk channel 78.

=== Bein Sports 3 ===
The channel broadcasts European matches, though Premier League matches generally predominate. It broadcasts 24 hours a day and can be watched on Digiturk channel 79.

=== Bein Sports 4 ===
The channel broadcasts European matches and Formula 1 races. It broadcasts 24 hours a day and can be watched on Digiturk channel 80.

=== Bein Sports 5 ===
The channel broadcasts overlapping European matches, with a primary focus on the Turkey Basketbol Süper Ligi. It broadcasts 24 hours a day and is available on Digiturk channel 81.

=== Bein Sports Max 1 ===
Matches that overlap are broadcast on the channel. The channel airs only live broadcasts. It can be watched on Digiturk channel 82.

=== Bein Sports Max 2 ===
Matches that overlap are broadcast on the channel. The channel airs only live broadcasts. It can be watched on Digiturk channel 83.

=== Bein Sports Haber ===
The channel broadcasts match highlights and various programs. It airs on Digiturk channel 85, Kablo TV channel 223, and via the Türksat satellite.
