= Digiturk =

Turkish satellite TV provider

- Industry: Satellite television, OTT streaming platform
- Founded: 1 January 1999; 27 years ago
- Area served: Europe (including Turkey and Azerbaijan), United States
- Key people: Nasser Al-Khelaifi (chairman); Yousef Al-Obaidly (CEO); Mehmet Emin Karamehmet (CEO)
- Owner: Çukurova Holding (1999–2016); TMSF (2016–2018) beIN Media Group (2018–present)
- Website: www.digiturk.com.tr

Digiturk is a Turkish satellite television provider founded in 1999, with services starting in mid-2000. They provide both national television channels and their own channels, national radio, and music streams of different genres. Digiturk is also the current owner of the broadcasting rights of Süper Lig. In addition to Turkey, Digiturk offers its television service throughout Europe, mainly for members of the Turkish diaspora. Reportedly, they have over 3.5 million subscribers worldwide. Digiturk's service is provided from Eutelsat 7A, positioned some 35 degrees west of the more traditionally used Türksat, and is encrypted via Cryptoworks (2000–2016) and Irdeto (2016–present) conditional access systems.

Digiturk channels include national channels, news channels, film and series channels, sports channels, children channels, music channels, documentary channels, entertainment and lifestyle channels and other international channels.

The Qatar-based beIN Media Group acquired Digiturk on 13 July 2015.

On 13 January 2017, Digiturk rebranded its in-house channels (DiziMax, MovieMax and Lig TV) under the beIN brand (beIN Series, beIN Movies and beIN Sports).
