= BeIN Sports (Canadian TV channel) =

beIN Sports
- Country: Canada
- Broadcast area: Canada
- Network: beIN SPORTS
- Headquarters: Markham, Ontario (administrative); Mexico City, Mexico (production)

Programming
- Languages: English; French; Spanish
- Picture format: 1080p, 16:9, MPEG-4, HDTV)

Ownership
- Owner: Ethnic Channels Group (name licensed by beIN Media Group)
- Sister channels: beIN Sports MENA beIN Sports France beIN Sports USA beIN Sports Australia beIN Sports Turkey beIN Sports Asia

History
- Launched: 12 January 2013; 13 years ago

Links
- Website: beIN Sports Canada

Availability

Streaming media
- beIN Sports Connect: Website
- FuboTV: Internet Protocol Television

beIN Sports (Canada) is a Canadian exempt English language discretionary specialty channel that launched on 31 January 2014. It is owned by Ethnic Channels Group, with the BeIN Sports name licensed by the Qatari-based BeIN Media Group.

beIN Sports primarily airs soccer, featuring coverage of such leagues as Ligue 1, along with content from other leagues in Europe. In addition, the channel airs international sports content, including Rugby, Auto racing, Handball, Motorcycle racing, Tennis and Volleyball.

== History ==
Logo used from 2014 - 2017

On 18 December 2013, Ethnic Channels Group announced that it had entered into a strategic partnership with Al Jazeera Media Network, owners of the beIN Sports brand, to launch a Canadian version. beIN Sports officially launched in Canada on 31 January 2014 via MTS, and later launched in March on Rogers and Bell Fibe TV.

The initial agreement involved the launch of two services in both English and Spanish. In August 2014, the CRTC approved a request by Ethnic Channels Group to have BeIN Sports USA's Spanish-language feed, beIN Sports En Español, authorized for distribution in Canada.

In August 2017, Ethnic Channels Group reached a deal to sublicense beIN Sports content to over-the-top streaming service DAZN for its Canadian launch until 2019.

== Programming ==
Soccer

- FIFA Intercontinental Cup
- France: Ligue 1, Ligue 2, Coupe de France, Trophée des Champions
- Poland: Ekstraklasa
- Portugal: Taça de Portugal, Supertaça Cândido de Oliveira
- Turkey: Süper Lig
- South America: Copa Libertadores, Copa Sudamericana, Recopa Sudamericana
- Africa

Auto Racing

- FIA European Rallycross Championship
- Motocross World Championship

Mixed martial arts

- One Championship (Friday fights only)

Professional wrestling

- Major League Wrestling: MLW Fusion
