= Marcador Internacional =

Marcador Internacional is a radio programme that it is broadcast in the Radio Marca studios from Barcelona. It focuses on the Premier League and Bundesliga matches which are played every Saturday. However, it also analyzes the most important news and matches from Italy, Portugal, other European leagues and South American football. Since the 2011–12 season, it is broadcast on Saturdays (14h-18h or 17h), on Sundays (15h-16h), on Mondays (15h-16h, an hour named Planeta MI) and on Thursday if Europa League games are played (19h-23h).
