= NEXTV =

Canadian over-the-top TV provider

- Company type: Private company
- Industry: Broadcasting
- Founded: 2007; 19 years ago
- Headquarters: Markham, Ontario, Canada
- Products: IPTV, Ethnic TV
- Owner: Ethnic Channels Group
- Website: NEXTV

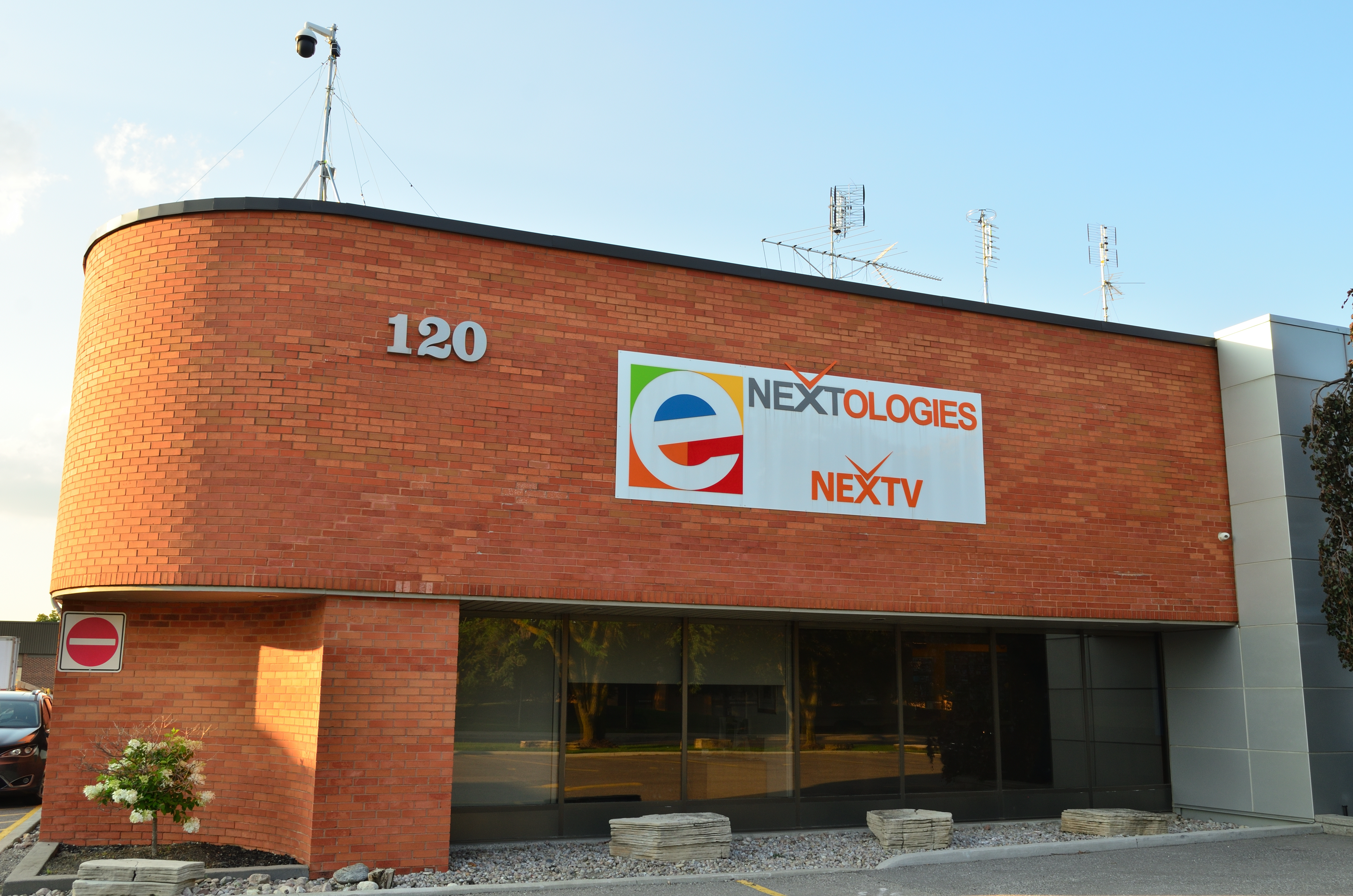
NEXTV in Markham

NEXTV is a Canada-based Over the Top provider that delivers digital television services via Internet. It launched in 2007 and is owned by Ethnic Channels Group, a Canadian ethnic broadcaster. NEXTV offers an array of multicultural channels to subscribers, via a set-top box and high speed Internet connection. In 2012, Ethnic Channels Group acquired a BDU license for the Greater Toronto Area.

NOTE: Service ended December 31, 2021 according to their website.

== Requirements ==
NEXTV delivers video and audio to the subscriber's home using their existing high speed internet connection. In order to receive the services offered by NEXTV, consumers require a high-speed Internet connection with a speed of at least 5.0 Mbit/s and a set-top box which can be purchased in local stores.

== Resources ==
- The face of ethnic media (Interview with Slava Levin -ECG & NEXTV)
- OTT A Major Challenge to Satellite, Ethnic Channels Group Says (Interview with Slava Levin - Co-founder and CEO of Ethnic Channels Group)
- New Sports Channel Wants to Play in Canada

== See also ==
- IPTV
- Ethnic Channels Group
