= BeIN Series (Turkish TV channel) =

beIN Series Turkey
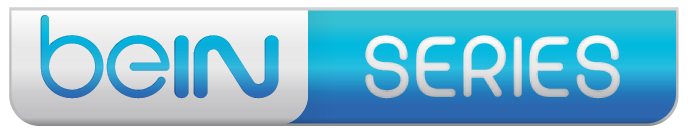
- Country: Turkey
- Broadcast area: Istanbul, Turkey

Programming
- Picture format: 16:9 1080i (HDTV)

Ownership
- Sister channels: beIN Series 1 beIN Series 2

History
- Launched: 14 February 2005
- Former names: DiziMax (2005–2017)

Links
- Website: www.digiturk.com.tr

beIN Series, formerly DiziMax, is a series of satellite television channels available on Turkish satellite television provider Digiturk. It consists of DiziMax, DiziMax HD, and DiziMaxMore and is available on Sinema Paketi (Cinema Package).

It was one of the international channels to broadcast the finale of Lost, simultaneously with the US broadcast, in HD. It is the Turkish version of beIN Series.

== See also ==
- beIN Series MENA
