= BeIN Sports (American TV channel) =

American sports television network

beIN Sports
- Country: United States
- Broadcast area: United States
- Network: beIN SPORTS
- Headquarters: Miami, Florida (administrative); Mexico City, Mexico (production)

Programming
- Languages: English; Spanish

Ownership
- Owner: beIN Media Group
- Key people: Nasser Al-Khelaifi (Chairman) Yousef Al-Obaidly (CEO)
- Sister channels: beIN Sports MENA; beIN Sports France; beIN Sports Canada; beIN Sports Australia; beIN Sports Turkey beIN Sports Asia

History
- Launched: August 16, 2012; 14 years ago

Links
- Website: www.beinsports.com/us/

Availability

Streaming media
- FuboTV: Live Stream
- Sling TV: Internet Protocol television
- Vidgo: Internet Protocol television
- beIN SPORTS Connect: OTT

BeIN Sports USA is an American pay television sports channel that launched on August 16, 2012. It is part of the BeIN Sports family of channels, a subsidiary of the Qatari-based BeIN Media Group.

BeIN Sports USA primarily airs soccer; featuring coverage of Ligue 1, along with other leagues in Europe. The channel also airs rugby, auto racing, handball, motorcycle racing, tennis and volleyball. A companion network, beIN Sports en Español, carries simulcasts or alternate programming primarily in Spanish, with both networks offering secondary Spanish or English commentary via the second audio program option.

As of December 2023, BeIN Sports is available in 8.97 million households in the United States that subscribe to a pay television service, while beIN Sports en Español is available in 6.152 million.

== History ==
BeIN Sports launched via DirecTV on August 16, 2012, coinciding with the start of the European soccer leagues 2012–13 season. The network would later launch on Dish Network the following day, Comcast on September 6, 2012 and Verizon FiOS in March 2013.

In 2016, BeIN Sports reached a deal with Conference USA to carry select football, basketball, baseball and softball games. This agreement ended after the 2018–19 season and was not renewed. Also in 2016, BeIN Sports began showing matches from the North American Soccer League.

In August 2018, several major television providers dropped the network; including AT&T (both DirecTV and U-verse), Verizon Fios and Xfinity.

In October 2018, the WTA Tour returned its broadcast rights back to Tennis Channel. Its contract with BeIN Sports (as part of a wider international deal) was criticized by fans for limiting the reach of its events due to inconsistent and intermittent scheduling (with scheduling conflicts favoring its soccer coverage) and declining carriage.

Based on numbers from Nielsen, beIN Sports was ranked as the lowest-rated broadcast or cable network in the United States in 2021 based on total viewers, with a 40% decline year-over-year.

== Programming ==
=== Current ===
==== International soccer ====
- FIFA Intercontinental Cup

==== European soccer ====
- France: Ligue 1, Ligue 2, Trophée des Champions
- Turkey: Süper Lig
- Portugal: Primeira Liga, Taça de Portugal, Supertaça Cândido de Oliveira
- Poland: Ekstraklasa

==== South American soccer ====
- Copa Libertadores
- Copa Sudamericana
- Recopa Sudamericana

==== African soccer ====
- Africa Cup of Nations
- Women's Africa Cup of Nations
- CAF Champions League
- CAF Confederation Cup

==== North American soccer ====
- El Salvador: Primera División

==== Basketball ====
- Canada: Basketball Super League
- Mexico: CIBACOPA

==== Talk/Debate Show (in Spanish only) ====
- Xtra Time

==== Professional wrestling ====
- Major League Wrestling
  - TV Specials (2023–present)

==== Combat sports ====
- BYB Extreme Bare Knuckle Fighting
- One Championship (Friday fights only)

=== Former ===
==== European soccer ====
- Spain: Copa del Rey (exclude final) (until 2018–19)
- France: Coupe de la Ligue (until 2019–20), Coupe de France (through 2022)
- Sweden: Swedish Cup (semifinals and final)
- Spain: La Liga 2012–2021
- Italy: Serie A 2012–2017
- England: EFL Cup 2012–2015
- Austria: ÖFB Cup (final only)

==== Basketball ====
- Europe: Basketball Champions League

==== Handball ====
- EHF Champions League

==== Professional Wrestling ====
- MLW Fusion (2018–2023)
- MLW Fusion: Alpha (2021)

==== Motorsports ====
- MotoAmerica (2016, 2017 and 2018)
- FIA World Rallycross Championship (WRX)
- SBK Superbike 2012–2018
- W Series
- World Touring Car Cup
- FIM Speedway Grand Prix

==== Tennis ====
- ATP World Tour 250

==== Gaelic games ====
- Gaelic Athletic Association

== Commentators ==
Effective January 22, 2024, the network's talent in English and Spanish works out of Mediapro's Mexico City facility, unless indicated; the former Miami Mediapro hub in Miami, Florida closed on January 31, 2024.

=== Hosts ===
English:

- Ramón Barrenechea (Lead: studio and voice-only)
- Rodrigo del Campo (Studio and voice-only)
- Daniel Noriega (Off-camera voice-only)
- Carlos Reynoso (Off-camera voice-only)

Spanish:

- Claudia García (Lead, studio)
- Daniela Noguéz (Studio)
- Ramón Barrenechea (Studio and voice-only)
- Rodrigo del Campo (Studio and voice-only)
- Rafael Gómez (Off-camera voice-only)

=== Play-by-Play ===
English:

- Ramón Barrenechea (Lead)
- Rodrigo Del Campo
- Carlos Reynoso

Spanish:

- Oscar Francisco Cano (Lead)
- Fernando Cevallos
- Andrés Terán
- Angel Jiménez
- Xavier Sol
- Ramón Barrenechea
- Ángel Quirarte
- Diego Beltrán Ramírez
- Esteban Cristancho Medina
- Luis Mario Sauret

=== Match Analysts / Studio Pundits ===
Spanish:

- Oscar Francisco Cano
- Fernando Cevallos
- Andrés Terán
- Armando Melgar
- Rodrigo Del Campo
- Ramón Barrenechea
- Ángel Jiménez
- Rafael Gómez
- Gerardo Velázquez
- Ángel Quirarte
- Diego Beltrán Ramírez
- Esteban Cristancho Medina
- Luis Mario Sauret

== BeIN Sports Xtra/en Español ==
In 2019, BeIN Sports launched BeIN Sports Xtra, a FAST channel extension featuring select free sporting events and related programming. Like the main network, Xtra also has a complementary Spanish service, beIN Sports Xtra en Español (beIN Sports Xtra ñ).

The service is available on FuboTV, Sling TV, Pluto TV, The Roku Channel, Vizio, Redbox, Samsung TV Plus, Fanatiz, Klowd TV and Xumo. Xtra is also carried on over-the-air television stations in select markets.

== Affiliates ==
List of BeIN Sports Xtra affiliates
| Media market | State | Station | Channel |
|---|---|---|---|
| Hot Springs | Arkansas | KTVV-LD6 | 18.6 |
| Phoenix | Arizona | KVPA-LD15 | 42.15 |
| Bakersfield | California | KJOU-LD6 | 12.6 |
| Cherry Valley | California | KILA-LD5 | 8.5 |
| Los Angeles | California | KFLA-LD5 | 8.5 |
| Palm Springs | California | KRET-CD7 | 45.7 |
| Ridgecrest | California | K24ON-D5 | 8.5 |
| Sacramento | California | KSAO-LD15 | 49.15 |
| Jacksonville | Florida | WWRJ-LD6 | 27.6 |
| Jupiter | Florida | WEWF-LD14 | 47.14 |
| Miami–Fort Lauderdale | Florida | WDGT-LD14 | 14.14 |
| Orlando | Florida | WOFT-LD3 | 8.3 |
| Tampa | Florida | WGCT-LD6 | 19.6 |
| Hinesville | Georgia | WGCB-LD3 | 35.3 |
| Montrose | Georgia | W34FX-D3 | 35.3 |
| Kailua | Hawaii | KKAI-DT3 | 50.3 |
| Waimānalo | Hawaii | KUPU-DT3 | 56.3 |
| Boise | Idaho | KKIC-LD6 | 16.6 |
| Oakwood Hills | Illinois | WCHU-LD6 | 3.6 |
| Jeffersonville | Indiana | WJYL-CD6 | 16.6 |
| Detroit | Michigan | WHNE-LD6 | 3.6 |
| Kansas City | Missouri | KUKC-LD15 | 14.15 |
| Rockfish | North Carolina | WTNG-CD3 | 7.3 |
| Westmoreland | New Hampshire | WVCC-LD6 | 49.6 |
| Buffalo | New York | WBXZ-LD6 | 56.6 |
| Greenwich | New York | WVBG-LD3 | 25.3 |
| New York City | New York | WHTV-LD6 | 18.6 |
| Cleveland | Ohio | WIVX-LD3 | 13.3 |
| Millersburg | Ohio | W27DG-D3 | 13.3 |
| Pittsburgh | Pennsylvania | WBYD-CD6 | 39.6 |
| Beaufort | South Carolina | WSCG-LD3 | 14.3 |
| Charleston | South Carolina | WHDC-LD9 | 12.9 |
| Florence–Myrtle Beach | South Carolina | W25FQ-D3 | 25.3 |
| Nashville | Tennessee | WIIW-LD6 | 14.6 |
| Beaumont | Texas | KULC-LD6 | 26.6 |
| Houston | Texas | KVVV-LD3 | 15.3 |
| Odessa–Midland | Texas | K34MX-D6 | 34.6 |
| San Antonio | Texas | KVHC-LD3 | 11.3 |
| Ogden | Utah | KSVN-CD15 | 25.15 |
| Salt Lake City | Utah | K08QQ-D15 | 25.15 |
| Chesapeake | Virginia | WJGN-CD6 | 38.6 |

List of BeIN Sports Xtra en Español affiliates
| Media market | State | Station | Channel |
|---|---|---|---|
| Hot Springs | Arkansas | KTVV-LD14 | 18.14 |
| Phoenix | Arizona | KVPA-LD7 | 42.7 |
| Bakersfield | California | KJOU-LD14 | 12.14 |
| Cherry Valley | California | KILA-LD15 | 8.15 |
| Los Angeles | California | KFLA-LD15 | 8.15 |
| Palm Springs | California | KRET-CD15 | 45.15 |
| Ridgecrest | California | K24ON-D15 | 8.15 |
| Homestead | Florida | WHMR-LD3 | 16.3 |
| Jacksonville | Florida | WWRJ-LD14 | 27.14 |
| Jupiter | Florida | WEWF-LD3 | 47.3 |
| Miami–Fort Lauderdale | Florida | WDGT-LD3 | 14.3 |
| Orlando | Florida | WOFT-LD14 | 8.14 |
| Kailua | Hawaii | KKAI-DT14 | 50.14 |
| Waimānalo | Hawaii | KUPU-DT14 | 56.14 |
| Boise | Idaho | KKIC-LD14 | 16.14 |
| Oakwood Hills | Illinois | WCHU-LD6 | 3.14 |
| Jeffersonville | Indiana | WJYL-CD6 | 16.14 |
| Detroit | Michigan | WHNE-LD14 | 3.14 |
| Kansas City | Missouri | KUKC-LD7 | 14.7 |
| Rockfish | North Carolina | WTNG-CD14 | 7.14 |
| Westmoreland | New Hampshire | WVCC-LD14 | 49.14 |
| Buffalo | New York | WBXZ-LD14 | 56.14 |
| Greenwich | New York | WVBG-LD15 | 25.15 |
| New York City | New York | WHTV-LD14 | 18.14 |
| Cleveland | Ohio | WIVX-LD14 | 13.14 |
| Millersburg | Ohio | W27DG-D14 | 13.14 |
| Pittsburgh | Pennsylvania | WBYD-CD14 | 39.14 |
| Nashville | Tennessee | WIIW-LD14 | 14.14 |
| Austin | Texas | KADF-LD7 | 20.7 |
| Beaumont | Texas | KULC-LD14 | 26.14 |
| Houston | Texas | KVVV-LD14 | 15.14 |
| Odessa–Midland | Texas | K34MX-D14 | 34.14 |
| San Antonio | Texas | KVHC-LD14 | 11.14 |
| Ogden | Utah | KSVN-CD7 | 25.7 |
| Salt Lake City | Utah | K08QQ-D7 | 25.7 |
| Chesapeake | Virginia | WJGN-CD14 | 38.14 |
