= Yousef Al-Obaidly =

Qatari businessman

- Born: Doha, Qatar
- Education: Seattle University
- Occupation: Businessman
- Title: Chief Executive Officer, beIN Media Group

Yousef Al-Obaidly is the CEO of sports, entertainment and media organisation beIN Media Group. Al-Obaidly also holds a number of board positions including at Paris Saint-Germain Football Club (PSG), Paris Saint-Germain Handball, Qatar Sports Investments (PSG's owners), Qatar Tennis Federation, Qatar Satellite Company Es'hailSat and Qatar based telecoms company Ooredoo.

In 2020, he was named among the top ten sports influencers in the year ahead. He is known for his influence in the debate surrounding anti-piracy in sports media.

== Early life ==
Yousef Al-Obaidly

Al-Obaidly was born in Doha, Qatar, where he spent his formative years, before studying in the US and graduating from Seattle University. After leaving university, Al-Obaidly played professional tennis and represented Qatar in the Davis Cup.

== Professional career ==
In 2003, Al-Obaidly played a role in the launch of Al Jazeera Sport, which would later transform into beIN Sports.

In 2012, he was responsible for the roll-out of beIN Sports in France and other territories including the Americas and Asia-Pacific.

He was promoted to the position of chief executive in 2018 and since his appointment as CEO, Al-Obaidly has been involved in media rights acquisitions for the FIFA Women's World Cup, FIFA Club World Cup, UEFA Euro 2020 and UEFA Champions League Al-Obaidly has however warned that media rights bubble is about to burst. Al-Obaidly has also spearheaded distribution and sub-licensing deals with Canal+, co-production deals with the BBC, and hired football figures such as Jose Mourinho and Arsène Wenger to perform punditry for beIN. Al-Obaidly is also the CEO of Digiturk, the leading pay-TV operator in Turkey.

== Anti-piracy advocacy ==
Yousef Al-Obaidly is a prominent figure in the fight against piracy and the protection of media rights, particularly with regards to the illegal streaming of beIN Sport's broadcasts by Saudi Arabian-based operator beoutQ during the Saudi Arabia - Qatar diplomatic crisis. He called for Saudi Arabia to uphold the rule of law.

During his keynote speech at the 2019 Leaders Week Sports Business Summit in London, he warned that football was in significant financial danger due to piracy.

In an interview with The Telegraph in 2019, Al-Obaidly described beoutQ's then ongoing piracy as "…without doubt – one of the largest and most damaging heists in corporate history." He specifically warned that piracy threatens Britain's thriving creative industries.

In April 2020, Al-Obaidly wrote to English Premier League Chief Executive Richard Masters and the chairs of all 20 Premier League clubs, demanding that they block the attempted takeover of Newcastle United by a consortium backed by the Public Investment Fund of Saudi Arabia (PIF). In the letter, he again offered a warning about football finances and accused the Saudi Arabian government of stealing the Premier League's commercial rights and member clubs' commercial revenues through its alleged backing of beoutQ. Al-Obaidly's letter prompted accusations from the buying consortium that beIN held improper influence over the consortium's undertaking of the Premier League's Owners' and Directors' Test. This was due to beIN being the holders of Premier League's highest value overseas media rights contract, which was later renewed in December 2020.

== Court cases ==
In 2019, a leaked report in Le Monde suggested that Al-Obaidly was under judicial investigation in France. However, it was later clarified that Al-Obaidly voluntarily attended an appointed meeting as part of a preliminary investigation and denied allegations against him.
