= BeoutQ =

Pirate pay television broadcaster serving Saudi Arabia

beoutQ
- Country: Saudi Arabia
- Broadcast area: Saudi Arabia

Programming
- Language: Arabic

Ownership
- Owner: Unknown

History
- Launched: August 2017
- Closed: August 2019

beoutQ was a pirate pay television broadcaster that operated in Saudi Arabia between August 2017 and August 2019. The service consisted of ten satellite television channels that carried rebranded feeds of programming from Qatari broadcaster beIN Sports; it launched during a then-ongoing diplomatic crisis between Qatar and other Arab countries over its alleged state sponsorship of terrorist groups, during which Saudi Arabia blocked beIN Media Group from doing business in the country. The service operated out of facilities in Saudi Arabia, and utilised the Arabsat satellites for transmission.

Concurrent with the service's operation, the Saudi government accused beIN Sports of engaging in anti-competitive behaviour and of participating in a smear campaign against the Kingdom with its sister company Al Jazeera; beoutQ's channels broadcast propaganda during advertising breaks which echoed these views. The service was condemned by beIN Media Group, sports bodies, and governments for its large-scale infringement of copyrights; beIN Sports's managing director described beoutQ as being an industrial-scale operation, and warned that the service was creating market conditions that would make them less likely to make larger investments in sports broadcast rights. Citing alleged inaction against the service, Saudi Arabia was placed on intellectual property watchlists by the United States Trade Representative and European Union.

Citing the impact of the service, beIN declined to renew its rights to Formula One and the Bundesliga in the MENA region. It also criticised football bodies for hosting super cups in Saudi Arabia. In June 2020, beIN Sports briefly pulled the Serie A from its channels worldwide until it was compensated for the impact of piracy on its rights. Issues surrounding beoutQ also impacted a bid by the Saudi Public Investment Fund to acquire Premier League club Newcastle United. In September 2021, a representative of the club accused beIN of engaging in lobbying efforts against the sale that improperly influenced the Premier League.

In August 2019, beoutQ abruptly ceased operations on satellite. Its set-top boxes continued to be usable via third-party IPTV services available on a built-in app store. In June 2020, the World Trade Organization (WTO) issued a report finding evidence that the service operated out of Saudi Arabia. The WTO also found that Saudi Arabia had frustrated beIN's ability to receive legal counsel in the country. In October 2021, after the diplomatic crisis was resolved, beIN Media Group stated that Saudi Arabia was planning to lift its ban on the beIN Sports service, ahead of the Premier League officially approving the Saudi purchase of Newcastle United.

== Background ==
The Qatar-based beIN Sports is the dominant broadcaster of sports programming in the Middle East and North Africa (MENA). It had held rights to prominent events such as the Olympic Games, the FIFA World Cup, UEFA Champions League, Asian Football Confederation (including the AFC Asian Cup), La Liga, and Premier League in association football, Formula One racing, international tennis events, and other events.

In June 2017, as part of a diplomatic crisis over alleged funding of extremist groups by the government of Qatar, beIN was banned from selling its subscriptions in Saudi Arabia, and the beIN Sports channels were briefly banned in the United Arab Emirates (the ban was reversed the following month). It was reported that Saudi Arabia planned to fund a new competitor out of Cairo, Egypt, known as PBS Sport, but the proposed service never launched.

A few months later, a new subscription service known as beoutQ emerged, which repackaged the beIN Sports channels as their own. Initially, the service was distributed online, but later began to be distributed via 10 satellite channels. The service's launch was backed by a social media campaign on Twitter; Saud al-Qahtani, former adviser to King Abdullah, participated in the campaign. It was reported that the service's associated decoder boxes and subscriptions had become widely available across the country, bundled with a free one-year subscription.

The service initially claimed that it was backed by Colombian and Cuban investors. However, this claim was denied by local officials in the two countries. In September 2018 during legal proceedings in the United States, beIN linked the beoutQ website to Saudi businessman Raed Khusheim, who is chief executive officer of UAE-based television provider Selevision. Khusheim denied the claims, arguing that it was a "smear campaign" by beIN stemming from business disputes.

== Programming ==
beoutQ's "Live Sports" programming was distributed via 10 channels. Initially, most of beoutQ's programming came verbatim from the beIN Sports networks, except with beoutQ digital on-screen graphics (DOG) overlaid over those of beIN Sports. The beIN Sports channels took on-air measures to frustrate these tactics, such as occasionally changing the position of its DOG so that beoutQ would have to reposition its own to cover it again. beIN Sports also displayed intermittent watermark graphics that are harder to obscure. After beIN Sports began to increasingly discuss and criticise the service on-air, beoutQ began to dub its own commentators over the beIN Sports feeds, and use feeds from other broadcasters such as Eleven Sports, and Telemundo Deportes (the U.S. Spanish-language rightsholder of FIFA tournaments).

During commercial breaks, the channels broadcast propaganda attacking Qatar and beIN; one such example included a cartoon short where a beIN Sports executive (depicted as a cigar-smoking businessman surrounded by piles of money) realises that beoutQ was stealing away his customers. He attempts to meet representatives of FIFA (including a cartoon portrayal of its president Gianni Infantino), UEFA, and the Premier League, but they all ignore him. When he gets home, he discovers that his children were also watching beoutQ. The short ended with a caption reading "No to monopoly, no to politicising sport".

beIN traced beoutQ's feeds to Arabsat, an Arab League-owned satellite operator; its frequencies were frequently mentioned in beoutQ's marketing. Arabsat regularly denied that it was involved in beoutQ. A French court commissioned an independent test that had also traced the signals to Arabsat. It was observed that beoutQ's satellite frequencies changed frequently during the test, likely to evade detection.

== Technical details ==
In 2019, MarkMonitor performed an investigation into beoutQ's hardware and software at the request of FIFA, UEFA, and major European football leagues. The beoutQ service was transmitted via Arabsat's Badr-4, Badr-5, and Badr-6 satellites, and was received using Android-based "hybrid" set-top boxes manufactured by the Chinese company DreamMax. Their firmware contained several levels of geolocation checks in order to prevent the boxes from being activated outside of Saudi Arabia, including over-the-air programming during its first-time setup that required access to beoutQ's satellite signal.

Alongside the beoutQ satellite channels, the boxes include a "beoutQ App Store" with a selection of third-party media apps. Of the 25 apps listed at the time of the review, most of them were for other pirate video on demand and subscription IPTV services. Of the three IPTV services highlighted by the MarkMonitor investigation, all three of them carried the beIN Sports channels (with one of them listing them in their program guide under the "beoutQ" name, but using the unmodified feeds from beIN), and one was listed on its website as being based in the Saudi capital of Riyadh. The beoutQ App Store also contained apps for legitimate services such as HBO Go, Red Bull TV, SoundCloud, Spotify, TED, TuneIn Radio, and YouTube.

In mid-August 2019, it was reported that beoutQ had shut down its satellite transmissions. The company claimed on social media that it was performing service upgrades, but its operations never resumed. The beoutQ boxes remained usable with other IPTV services.

== Reactions ==
The beoutQ service was widely condemned by beIN Media Group, broadcasters, and sports rightholders. It was feared that the normalisation of piracy caused by beoutQ could hamper Saudi Arabia's efforts to redevelop its cinema industry. The Hollywood Reporter observed that due to "the hugely sensitive nature of anything involving Saudi Arabia", there was relatively little reaction to the service from the entertainment industry. Tim Fernholz of Quartz described Saudi Arabia's alleged involvement in beoutQ as an example of the country's "no-holds-barred attitude" in its dispute with Qatar, and as an effort to undermine Al Jazeera's "soft power".

=== By beIN and Al Jazeera ===
The owner of beIN Sports, beIN Media Group, condemned the beoutQ service. beIN Sports managing director Tom Keaveny described beoutQ as being an "industrial-scale" operation, and not just "a small outfit operating out of someone’s bedroom."

In February 2019, Keaveny stated that the stances of rightsholders over the unauthorised redistribution of their content would now be a "critical" consideration in future rights deals and that beIN would also pay less because their rights could no longer be protected. He argued that piracy was "an existential threat to the economic model of the sports and entertainment industry". That month, beIN declined to renew its MENA rights to Formula One, citing the market conditions. The rights would be acquired by the free-to-air satellite channel MBC Action, whose parent company Middle East Broadcasting Center is majority-owned by the Saudi government.

In June 2019, beIN laid off 300 employees, citing the piracy issues as a factor. In October 2019 at the Leaders Week conference in London, beIN Media Group CEO Yousef Al-Obaidly predicted that the market for sports broadcast rights could crash if rightsholders did not take enough steps to prevent the unauthorised redistribution of their content.

On 21 September 2019, the Al Jazeera program What Lies Beneath broadcast an investigative report alleging that beoutQ's operations were based in Riyadh and tied to the service providers Selevision and Shammas. It also claimed to have obtained evidence of plans to potentially move the transmission site to North Africa, and a leaked video showing the operation's headquarters and infrastructure.

In November 2019, beIN Sports stated that it was "actively reconsidering" its relationship with the Lega Serie A over its agreement to host editions of the Supercoppa Italiana in Saudi Arabia. beIN accused the league of "making a quick buck from the very entity that has been stealing its rights for two years". beIN's contract with the Serie A is valued at around US$500 million—accounting for just over half of the league's international media rights revenue. The Supercoppa agreement had also faced criticism for Saudi Arabia's history of using sport to direct attention away from its human rights issues.

When the Serie A resumed its 2019–20 season on 20 June 2020 after a suspension due to the COVID-19 pandemic, beIN suspended its broadcasts of the league on all of its networks worldwide. The company stated that its "legal and public position" had been "consistent and well-documented for three years". The suspension ended on 29 June, after beIN reached an agreement to be compensated for the impact of piracy on its media rights.

A bid led by Saudi Arabia's Public Investment Fund (PIF) to acquire Premier League club Newcastle United faced scrutiny due to beoutQ, among other factors. In May 2020, Conservative Party Member of Parliament Giles Watling proposed that the Department for Digital, Culture, Media and Sport hold an evidence session regarding sports piracy in Saudi Arabia. beIN Sports's lead English football presenter, Richard Keys, regularly expressed opposition to the Newcastle deal on-air, mentioning beIN's conflicts with beoutQ.

On 22 September 2020, beIN announced that it would not renew its MENA region rights to Germany's Bundesliga. Chief sports officer Richard Verow argued that piracy was crippling the market and reaffirmed that beIN would "only bid for rights at levels that make economic sense and have a value proposition".

=== By Saudi Arabia ===
During the 2018 FIFA World Cup, beIN Sports commentators were accused by Saudi critics, including General Sports Authority head Turki Al-Sheikh, of making on-air comments critical of the country. On 22 June 2018, Saud al-Qahtani stated that the Saudi Arabian Football Federation had filed a complaint with FIFA against beIN Sports's alleged monopolization of sports broadcast rights in the MENA region. He also stated that the government was coordinating "inspection campaigns" and confiscating beoutQ equipment.

In July 2018, the Ministry of Media accused the All-England Club—organisers of Wimbledon—of "parroting" beIN's accusations surrounding beoutQ and the involvement of Arabsat, which it considered to be "baseless" and lacking credible evidence. Furthermore, the Ministry of Media described beIN as having engaged in an "irresponsible" smear campaign against Saudi Arabia by means of its sister company Al Jazeera Media Network, which it described as "a media platform for terrorists to propagate their violent messages and to promote instability in the region".

beIN Sports was fined US$2.6 million by the Saudi government on 21 August 2018 for violations of competition law, including forced bundling of its services with other unrelated channels. beIN accused the Saudi government of "putting politics ahead of the interests of Saudi consumers" and singling beIN out for engaging in business practices common to other sports and entertainment broadcasters in Saudi Arabia and worldwide. Two days later, beIN Sports's license to broadcast in Saudi Arabia was officially revoked.

=== By other countries ===
In November 2018, the BBC and Sky plc sent letters to European Commissioner for Trade Cecilia Malmström, urging that action be taken against beoutQ's operations.

Stan McCoy, the EMEA president of the Motion Picture Association of America (MPAA), told The Hollywood Reporter that the MENA Anti-Piracy Coalition—which includes various broadcasters and service providers serving the region, including Arabsat—was "very much activated" on the issue of beoutQ, On 6 March 2019, the Coalition sent a letter to Arabsat demanding that it take a position and/or action towards beoutQ within two weeks, or else the Coalition would issue a public statement and begin the process of removing Arabsat from the group. The Coalition could not agree on the wording for the statement; thus, no action was taken.

At an anti-piracy conference held in Abu Dhabi in April 2019 by members of the Coalition, there was little to no discussion of beoutQ. A moderator allegedly warned a speaker that they could potentially face legal issues if they went "too far" on beoutQ, but the organisers of the conference denied that such a restriction existed. That month, the United States Trade Representative (USTR) designated beoutQ as a "notorious market" in its annual Special 301 Report, citing that its equipment continued to be "widely available" and "generally unregulated" in Saudi Arabia, and that the country had not taken steps to address Arabsat's alleged role in the service. Saudi Arabia was also added to the "Priority Watch List" for its failure to "address longstanding [intellectual property] concerns and the further deterioration of IP protection and enforcement within its borders".

In January 2020, the European Commission placed Saudi Arabia on its priority watch list for violations of European intellectual property rights, citing the country's inaction against the service. In April 2020, Saudi Arabia was placed on the USTR's Priority Watch List for the second year in a row, citing via submissions by the Premier League that illegal IPTV services continued to be available in the Saudi market on "up to three million" beoutQ boxes, among other devices.

=== By sports bodies ===
FIFA attempted to indirectly negotiate a deal with beIN to sub-license the Saudi team matches and final of the 2018 FIFA World Cup to a Saudi Arabian broadcaster. However, no deal was reached, and beoutQ ultimately broadcast the entire tournament from various sources, including beIN and the Israeli Public Broadcasting Corporation (which was offering Arabic-language broadcasts).

The Asian Football Confederation (AFC) condemned beoutQ for airing the 2019 AFC Asian Cup, stating that it "has already instructed counsel to take legal action in Saudi Arabia and is working alongside other sports rights owners that have also been affected to protect its interest". However, in March 2019, the AFC pulled its rights in Saudi Arabia from beIN Sports (moving them to an in-house streaming platform), in support of the Saudi claim that the network held a monopoly. beIN announced that it would pursue legal action, considering the actions to be politically motivated and accusing the AFC of colluding with the Saudi Arabian Football Federation to violate its contract.

In June 2019, the Serie A's new CEO Luigi De Siervo stated that the league was taking legal action and would not rule out pulling Saudi Arabia's hosting rights to the Supercoppa (which had been negotiated by his predecessor Marco Brunelli).

In July 2019, FIFA, the AFC, the Bundesliga, La Liga, Serie A, and UEFA issued a joint statement condemning beoutQ, urging Saudi authorities to take "swift and decisive action" against the broadcaster. The parties stated that it was "not possible to retain legal counsel in the kingdom of Saudi Arabia which is willing or able to act on our behalf".

== WTO case, resolution of the conflict ==
On 2 October 2018, Qatar filed a case against Saudi Arabia with the World Trade Organization (WTO), citing violations of the TRIPS Agreement. The same day, beIN Media Group also initiated an investment arbitration lawsuit against Saudi Arabia seeking US$1 billion in damages, citing beoutQ and other measures that had hindered its ability to do business in the country.

On 16 June 2020, the WTO panel issued its report concerning Qatar's complaint against Saudi Arabia and it's alleged failure to provide adequate protection of intellectual property rights held by or applied for entities based in Qatar. The panel report found that beoutQ had received assistance from a Saudi-based content distributor, had used the facilities of Arabsat for transmission, and benefitted from promotion by government officials. The WTO panel also found that Saudi Arabia had obstructed beIN Media Group from receiving counsel in the country. On 29 July 2020, Saudi Arabia appealed the ruling, arguing that it contained "serious errors of law and legal interpretation that need to be corrected". beIN then accused the Saudi government of "[lying] to governments and rightsholders across world sport about the WTO ruling" and "appealing a WTO decision that they said they won".

On 4 January 2021, Qatar and Saudi Arabia agreed to restore their diplomatic ties under a deal brokered by Kuwait and the United States. After the resolution, Reuters reported that restaurants in Riyadh had begun to screen beIN Sports programming via satellite, although beIN claimed Saudi Arabia had not yet reinstated its license to broadcast in the country.

During a hearing of the UK Competition Appeal Tribunal (CAT) in September 2021, a representative of Newcastle United argued that the Premier League was "improperly influenced" from lobbying by beIN Sports and other Premier League clubs in its decision to block the sale, constituting an "unfair application of rules" and "abuse of its position which distorted competition".

On 6 October 2021, beIN Media Group stated that Saudi Arabia was preparing to lift their ban on beIN Sports. The decision was reported to have been a concession in order to expedite approval of the Public Investment Fund's acquisition of Newcastle United, which was officially cleared by the Premier League the next day. In January 2022, Qatar and Saudi Arabia mutually agreed to suspend their case with the WTO.

== See also ==
- Qatar–Saudi Arabia relations
