= BeIN Sports (Australian TV channel) =

Australian pay television sports network

beIN Sports
- Country: Australia; New Zealand
- Broadcast area: Australia; New Zealand
- Network: beIN Sports
- Headquarters: Brisbane, Australia

Programming
- Language: English
- Picture format: 1080p 16:9, MPEG-4, HDTV

Ownership
- Owner: beIN Media Group
- Sister channels: beIN Sports MENA beIN Sports France beIN Sports USA beIN Sports Canada beIN Sports Turkey beIN Sports Asia

History
- Launched: 1 November 2007; 19 years ago
- Former names: Setanta Sports Australia (2007–2014)

Links
- Website: Official website (AU); Official website (NZ)

Availability

Streaming media
- beIN Sports Connect: Watch live (Australia); Watch live (New Zealand)
- Foxtel Play: Watch live (Australia only)

beIN Sports is an Australian and New Zealander pay television sports network that was launched in 2007 as Setanta Sports.

In late 2014, Setanta Sports Australia was acquired by the beIN Media Group. As a result, on 24 November 2014, the channel was rebranded as beIN Sports.

The channel airs soccer, rugby union, tennis and European handball events. Its broadcast rights include Football League Cup, Football League Championship, Ligue 1, German Bundesliga, La Liga, Italian Serie A, SPFL, RBS 6 Nations, Major League Soccer and WTA.

On 14 May 2016, beIN Sports in Australia expanded from one to three channels, all of which are available in HD. Previously, there was only one SD channel available. For Foxtel users, all three channels became available as part of the sports pack at no additional cost, whereas previously the single channel was an add-on at an additional fee.

In September 2019, Sky Sport in New Zealand announced a four-year partnership with beIN for extensive soccer coverage. beIN Sports was broadcast as Sky Sport 7, and promoted as Sky Sports 7 beIN Sports until the agreement ended on 31 July 2023.

beIN Sports left the Foxtel (alongside PBS Kids) and Kayo Sports platforms in Australia on 1 July 2023.

Since January 2024, beIN Sports has been available through the Prime Video streaming service.

== Programming ==
=== Current ===
==== Football ====
beIN Sports football rights include:

- FIFA Intercontinental Cup (2024-present, only broadcast last three of five matches)
- UEFA men's national team (2026-2028)
  - UEFA Nations League
  - UEFA Euro 2028 qualifying
- CONMEBOL
  - Libertadores (through 2026)
  - Sudamericana (through 2026)
  - Recopa (through 2026)
- The FA (NZ only)
  - FA Cup
  - Community Shield
- EFL (including Cup and Trophy)
- La Liga
- Supercopa de España
- Bundesliga
- Serie A
- Scottish Premiership
- Coupe de France
- DFL-Supercup
- Taça da Liga (simulcast with Triller TV)
- Scottish Challenge Cup
- Scottish League Cup
- Africa Cup of Nations

==== Basketball ====
beIN Sports rights include

- Asian University Basketball League
- East Asia Super League

==== Motorsport ====
beIN Sports rights include:

- Deutsche Tourenwagen Masters

==== Padel ====
- FIP
- Premier Padel

==== Tennis (Australia only) ====
beIN Sports rights include:

- ATP Tour
- WTA Tour
- Davis Cup
- Fed Cup

=== Former ===
==== Football ====
- UEFA European Championship (2016)
- Copa América (2015, 2016, and 2019)
- Premier League (2016–2019) (NZ only)
- Scottish Cup (until 2022–23)
- Coupe de la Ligue (until 2020)
- KNVB Cup (2017–18 only)
- Argentine Primera División (2016–2019)
- Campeonato Brasileiro Série A
- International Champions Cup

==== Rugby Union (Australia only) ====
- Ireland Home Internationals
- Wales Home Internationals
- Scotland Home Internationals
- Argentina Home Internationals
- All Blacks Spring Tour

==== Table Tennis ====
- T2 Diamond

== See also ==
- List of sports television channels
- beIN Sports
- beIN Sports France
- beIN Sports USA
- beIN Sports Canada
- beIN Sports MENA
- beIN Sports Turkey
