= BeIN Sports (French TV channel) =

French sports broadcaster

beIN Sports
- Logo of the network starting 1 January 2017.
- Country: France
- Broadcast area: France
- Network: beIN Sports
- Headquarters: Boulogne-Billancourt, Paris

Programming
- Languages: English, French
- Picture format: 1080i 16:9, MPEG-4, HDTV)

Ownership
- Owner: beIN Media Group
- Key people: Nasser Al-Khelaifi (Chairman) Yousef Al-Obaidly (CEO)
- Sister channels: beIN Sports MENA beIN Sports USA beIN Sports Canada beIN Sports Australia beIN Sports Turkey beIN Sports Asia

History
- Launched: 2 June 2012; 14 years ago
- Former names: beIN Sport (2012–2013) and also Sport+ too

Links
- Website: www.beinsports.com/france/

Availability

Streaming media
- beIN Sports Connect: connect.beinsports.com/france/

beIN Sports France is a French network of sports channels owned by Qatari Sports Investments (an affiliate of beIN Media Group) and operated by Mediapro. It is the French version of the global sports network beIN Sports.

== History ==
In 2011, Al Jazeera Sport acquired the rights of broadcasting some of the French football league matches inside France and full marketing rights for the French league outside France.

Monday, 5 December 2011 UEFA announced on its website that Al Jazeera Sport awarded media rights in France for UEFA Champions League 2012–15.

According to the UEFA website, each season Al Jazeera Sport will broadcast 133 matches live across its television channels, internet and mobile services. The broadcaster has also committed to significant pre-match preview programming and highlights on both UEFA Champions League matchnights.

BeIN Sport 1 launched on 1 June 2012 at 19h and BeIN Sport 2 launched on 27 July 2012 at 20h. BeIN Sport Max additional channels were launched on 10 August 2012. This was the launch of the BeIN brand.

Their programmes are operated by Mediapro.

On 1 January 2014, beIN Sport became beIN Sports, to show that it is multisports and not only football.

beIN Sports 3 was launched on 15 September 2014, replacing beIN Sports Max 3.

On 11 May 2017, beIN Sports lost its rights to the UEFA Champions & Europa Leagues to SFT Sports. That same year, they also lost their entire catalogue of cycling rights. In 2021, beIN Sports extended its rights to La Liga in France until 2024.

On 25 June 2024, Ligue 2 announcement official broadcaster all matches in BeIN Sports from 2024–25 to 2028–29.

== Programming ==
=== Football ===
- Europe: UEFA European Championship, UEFA European Under-21 Championship (exc. 2021)
- France: Ligue 2 (all matches from 2024–25 to 2028–29), Coupe de France
- Germany: Bundesliga, DFL-Supercup
- United Kingdom: EFL Championship, EFL Cup, FA Community Shield, FA Cup
- Turkey: Süper Lig
- South America: Copa América
- Africa: CAF World Cup Qualifiers, Africa Cup of Nations, Africa Cup of Nations Qualifiers, CAF Champions League
- FIFA World Cup

=== Rugby union ===
- United Rugby Championship
- European Rugby Champions Cup
- European Rugby Challenge Cup

=== Handball ===
- IHF
- Europe: EHF Champions League, Women's EHF Champions League, European Men's Handball Championship, European Women's Handball Championship
- France: LNH Division 1, Coupe de la Ligue, Trophée des champions, Coupe de France, Coupe de France de handball féminin
- Germany: Handball-Bundesliga

=== American Football ===
- NFL

=== Baseball ===
- MLB

=== Basketball ===
- NBA
- WNBA

=== Beach volleyball ===
- FIVB Beach Volleyball World Tour

=== Cycling ===
- UCI Road World Championships
- UCI Track Cycling World Championships

=== Rugby league ===
- Super League
- National Rugby League
- State of Origin series
- Rugby League World Cup

=== Swimming ===
- FINA Swimming World Cup
- Open de France de natation
- French Swimming Federation Golden Tour
- Championnats de France de natation

=== Tennis ===
- Wimbledon
- ATP World Tour 250 series
- Open 13
- Open Parc Auvergne-Rhône-Alpe
- Davis Cup
- Fed Cup
- WTA Tour

=== Track and field ===
- IAAF World Challenge

=== Volleyball ===
- Italy: Italian Volleyball League
- 2014 FIVB Volleyball Men's World Championship
- 2014 FIVB Volleyball Women's World Championship
