= BeIN Sports (Middle East TV channel) =

Middle Eastern sports television channels

beIN Sports MENA
- Country: Qatar
- Broadcast area: Middle East and North Africa
- Headquarters: Doha, Qatar

Programming
- Languages: Arabic; English; French
- Picture format: (1080p 16:9 MPEG-4, HDTV)

Ownership
- Owner: beIN Media Group
- Key people: Nasser Al-Khelaifi (Chairman); Yousef Al-Obaidly (CEO)
- Sister channels: beIN Sports France beIN Sports USA beIN Sports Canada beIN Sports Australia beIN Sports Turkey beIN Sports Asia

History
- Launched: 1 November 2003; 23 years ago
- Former names: Al Jazeera Sport (2003–2014)

Links
- Website: www.beinsports.com

Availability

Streaming media
- TOD: www.tod.tv/en
- beIN Connect: connect.bein.net

beIN Sports MENA (Arabic: بي إن سبورتس العربية) is a subsidiary of beIN Sports. It is based in Doha, Qatar, serving the Middle East and North Africa (MENA) region. They are owned by beIN Media Group, a former subsidiary of Al Jazeera Media Network; the sports channels were spun off from Al Jazeera Media Network in December 2013. Following the spin-off, the channels' parent company was incorporated in January 2014 as their holding company. The channels primarily broadcast in Arabic, but it also offers feeds in English, French and Spanish.

Formerly known as Al Jazeera Sport, it was re-named beIN Sports in December 2013 to unify it with Al Jazeera's international group of sports networks in the lead-up to the 2014 FIFA World Cup.

In July 2013, the network acquired MENA rights to the Premier League. On 4 September 2017, the IOC announced a partnership with beIN Sports to launch a local linear version of Olympic Channel for MENA on 1 November 2017.

== History ==
Al Jazeera Sport was founded on 1 November 2003 by Qatari channel Al Jazeera.

On 1 November 2005, the channel launched its new website.

The group of Al Jazeera Sport channels was spun off from Al Jazeera Media Network in December 2013 and subsequently renamed to "beIN Sports" in January 2014; at the same time, the channels' parent company was incorporated as "beIN Media Group".

== Logos ==
Logo of Al Jazeera Sport from 2003 to 2009

Logo of Al Jazeera Sport from 2009 to 2014

Logo of beIN SPORTS from 2014 to 2016

Logo of beIN SPORTS 2016 right now

== Channels ==
The current Arabic-language sports channels in the beIN Sports group:

- beIN Sports News HD (free-to-air) (focused on International sports news)
- beIN Sports HD (free-to-air) (focused on Arabic football competitions)
- beIN Sports 1 (focused on analytical studio)
- beIN Sports 2 (focused on English domestic football competitions)
- beIN Sports 3 (focused on Spanish domestic football competitions)
- beIN Sports 4 (focused on French domestic football competitions)
- beIN Sports 5 (focused on Continental football competitions)
- beIN Sports 6 (focused on Continental football competitions)
- beIN Sports 7 (focused on Tennis competitions)
- beIN Sports 8 (focused on Motorsport competitions)
- beIN Sports 9 (focused on Different sports)
- BeIN Sports Xtra 1
- BeIN Sports Xtra 2
- BeIN Sports Xtra 3
- BeIN Sports Xtra 4
- BeIN Sports Xtra 5
- BeIN Sports Xtra 6
- BeIN Sports Xtra 7
- BeIN Sports Xtra 8
- BeIN Sports Xtra 9

English and French Language channels

- beIN Sports English 1
- beIN Sports English 2
- beIN Sports French 1
- beIN Sports French 2

BeIN Sports events channels.

- beIN Sports Max 1
- beIN Sports Max 2
- beIN Sports Max 3
- beIN Sports Max 4
- beIN Sports Max 5
- beIN Sports Max 6

== Sporting events ==
=== Football ===
==== Club competitions ====
===== Domestic leagues =====
- Premier League
- La Liga
- Ligue 1
- Süper Lig
- EFL Championship
- EFL League One
- EFL League Two
- Segunda División
- Ligue 2

===== Domestic cups =====
- FA Cup
- FA Community Shield
- EFL Cup
- Coupe de France
- Trophée des Champions

===== Continental =====
- UEFA Champions League
- UEFA Europa League
- UEFA Conference League
- UEFA Super Cup
- UEFA Youth League
- UEFA Women's Champions League
- CAF Champions League
- CAF Confederation Cup
- CAF Super Cup
- CAF Women's Champions League
- AFC Champions League Elite
- AFC Champions League Two
- AFC Women's Champions League
- Copa Libertadores
- Copa Sudamericana
- Recopa Sudamericana
- FIFA Intercontinental Cup

==== National team competitions ====
- FIFA World Cup
- FIFA U-20 World Cup
- FIFA U-17 World Cup
- FIFA Women's World Cup
- FIFA U-20 Women's World Cup
- FIFA U-17 Women's World Cup
- UEFA European Championship
- UEFA Nations League
- UEFA European Under-21 Championship
- UEFA European Under-19 Championship
- UEFA European Under-17 Championship
- UEFA Women's Championship
- UEFA Women's Under-19 Championship
- UEFA Women's Under-17 Championship
- Africa Cup of Nations
- African Nations Championship
- U-23 Africa Cup of Nations
- U-20 Africa Cup of Nations
- U-17 Africa Cup of Nations
- Women's Africa Cup of Nations
- African U-20 Women's World Cup qualification
- African U-17 Women's World Cup qualification
- AFC Asian Cup
- AFC U-23 Asian Cup
- AFC U-20 Asian Cup
- AFC U-17 Asian Cup
- AFC Women's Asian Cup
- AFC U-20 Women's Asian Cup
- AFC U-17 Women's Asian Cup

=== American Football ===
- NFL
- Super Bowl

=== Basketball ===
- NBA
- FIBA Basketball World Cup
- EuroBasket
- AfroBasket
- FIBA Asia Cup
- FIBA AmeriCup

=== Handball ===
- LNH Division 1

=== Tennis ===
- Australian Open
- French Open
- Wimbledon
- US Open
- ATP Finals
- ATP Masters 1000
- ATP 500
- ATP 250
- Davis Cup
- Billie Jean King Cup
- Laver Cup
- WTA Qatar Open

=== Padel ===
- Premier Padel
- Hexagon Cup

=== Motorsport ===
- Formula 1
- Formula 2
- Formula 3
- F1 Academy
- MotoGP
- Superbike
- FIA World Endurance Championship
- World Rally Championship
- European Rally Championship
- Deutsche Tourenwagen Masters

=== Athletics ===
- World Athletics Championships

=== Combat sport ===
- ONE Championship

=== Olympic Games ===
- 2026 Winter Olympics
- 2028 Summer Olympics

== Controversy ==
=== Piracy in Saudi Arabia ===
In the wake of the ongoing diplomatic crisis between Qatar and other Arab nations, the beIN Sports channels were briefly banned in the United Arab Emirates in June 2017, and Saudi Arabia banned beIN from selling its subscriptions in the country. The channels have since become available in Saudi Arabia via an unofficial satellite service known as beoutQ, which repackages beIN Sports channels as their own by overlaying its own digital on-screen graphics on the feed. beIN has published evidence linking the service Arabsat, but its operators have consistently denied any involvement. The beoutQ service has been criticised by a number of sports sanctioning bodies and event organisers due to its commercial-scale copyright infringement.

On 2 October 2018, Qatar filed a case against Saudi Arabia with the World Trade Organization, citing violations of the TRIPS Agreement. The same day, beIN Media Group also initiated an investment arbitration lawsuit against Saudi Arabia seeking US$1 billion in damages, citing beoutQ and other measures decided to hinder its business in Saudi Arabia.

In February 2019, beIN's managing director stated that rightsholder stances on beoutQ's "industrial-scale theft" would be a consideration in future rights deals, and that it would also pay less because it can no longer guarantee that its rights would be protected. He went on to explain that "we have been warning of the very real commercial consequences of beoutQ's theft of world sport and entertainment for almost two years now – yet the piracy continues with impunity every day and represents an existential threat to the economic model of the sports and entertainment industry." In June 2019, beIN laid off 300 employees, citing the piracy issues as a factor. It also declined to renew its rights to Formula One, which were instead acquired by free-to-air satellite channel MBC Action.

=== Monopoly accusations ===
Free-to-air broadcasters in Algeria, Egypt, Morocco, and Tunisia decided against sub-licensing domestic rights to the 2017 Africa Cup of Nations from beIN, considering the fees they were charging to be too exorbitant.

On 22 June 2018, minister Saud al-Qahtani stated that the Saudi Arabian Football Federation (SAFF) had filed a complaint with FIFA against beIN Sports' monopolization of sports broadcast rights in the MENA region.

On 21 August 2018, beIN Sports was fined US$2.6 million by Saudi Arabia for violations of competition law, including forced bundling of its services with other unrelated channels. beIN responded to the fine by claiming it was politically-motivated, arguing that they were being "attacked by the Saudi authorities for doing exactly what sports and entertainment broadcasters around the world do, and indeed what other broadcasters active in the Saudi market also do", and that the actions were "another illegitimate attempt by Saudi Arabia to drive beIN's highly successful business from the country, putting politics ahead of the interests of Saudi consumers.", also factoring in the aforementioned beoutQ piracy operation. On 23 August 2018, beIN Sports' license to broadcast in Saudi Arabia was officially revoked.

On 12 March 2019, the SAFF announced that the Asian Football Confederation had stripped beIN Sports of its media rights in Saudi Arabia to "cancel" its monopoly on football, citing the "illegality of BeIN Sport [sic] to transmit in the Kingdom due to the grave violations of the laws and regulations BeIN Sport has committed", and "its inability to obtain the required licenses necessary for it to fulfil its commitments in transmitting AFC's competitions to the viewers and followers in the Kingdom". The AFC announced that it would "gradually" transition its media rights to an in-house digital platform, beginning with a Saudi Professional League match occurring that week. The AFC had previously condemned the aforementioned beoutQ for its illegal broadcasts of the 2019 AFC Asian Cup. beIN subsequently announced that it would pursue legal action, accusing the AFC of apparent collusion with the SAFF to breach its media rights agreements.

== Broadcast ==
=== Satellite ===
On 1 March 2014, they launched SD switch-off on satellite. These channels will carry a text caption with SD shutdown information until 11 June 2014.

On 11 June 2014, BeIN Sports switch-off SD satellite transmissions.

=== Smartcards ===
On its launch in 2003, Subscribers could receive encrypted programs with an integrated CA on satellite receivers.

Since 1 March 2014, after switching to the Irdeto secure mode, subscribers must have a JSC/BeIN receiver to watch encrypted programs.

==== Timeline ====
- 1 November 2003: Start of Al Jazeera Sports channels.
- 1 January 2014: Rebranded beIN Sports.
- 11 June 2014: SD switch-off on satellite.
