= GOL PLAY =

Spanish sports TV channel

Gol
- Country: Spain
- Broadcast area: Spain, Andorra
- Headquarters: Barcelona, Spain

Programming
- Language: Spanish
- Picture format: 1080i HDTV

Ownership
- Owner: Mediapro

History
- Launched: 19 September 2008; 18 years ago (as pay channel); 1 June 2016; 10 years ago (as free-to-air channel)
- Replaced: Hogar 10
- Closed: 30 June 2015; 11 years ago (as pay channel) 17 June 2025; 16 months ago (as free-to-air channel); 1 October 2026; 39 days ago (as pay channel)
- Replaced by: beIN Sports (for pay channel); Replay (for pay channel)
- Former names: Gol T (2008–2015); GOL (2016–2022)

Links
- Website: Official website

GOL PLAY was a Spanish sports television network dedicated fully to football (from 2009) and other sports (from 2016). The channel, created by Mediapro in September 2008, is distributed through cable operators, Internet television, and from August 2009, through digital terrestrial television.

GolT logo from 19 September 2008 to 30 June 2015.

Mediapro's original intention was to broadcast the channel through terrestrial television, opening a slot for pay television, and in 2009 negotiations began with the Government of Spain. On 13 August 2009, an urgent decree approved premium contents on terrestrial television, and Gol Televisión began its broadcasting on 14 August.

== History ==
For the current history, see also es: Gol (canal de televisión)

The channel previously existed as Gol Televisión and was broadcasting from September 19, 2008 until June 30, 2015, when the rental agreement between Mediapro and Atresmedia ended to broadcast in one of its multiplexes. The channel was replaced, already outside the DTT, by beIN Sports thanks to the agreement between Mediapro and Al Jazeera (owner of beIN globally).

Mediapro managed to rent a frequency to return to DTT in Spain after the licensing contest of 2015.

On March 22, 2016, Mediapro announced that it would regain the name of Gol T for its new open channel on DTT. During the weeks prior to the presentation of the channel, Mediapro issued a video loop with images of various sports and a text that indicated that soon on that frequency you could enjoy a new sports channel. During this period, the night of April 11 to 12, 2016, the boxing match between Pacquiao and Bradley III was aired.

Finally, on June 1, 2016, the channel's test emissions began, already with the GOL logo (without the 'T'). During the broadcasts in tests, several live competitions were broadcast, including football, tennis, motor, extreme sports, etc.

On June 29, 2016 the Galician operator R Galicia incorporated the signal to channel 80 of its television service, thus being the first operator to have the sports channel.

On August 16, 2016, the operator Movistar + added the signal to channel 62 of its television service, both in satellite, IPTV and Fiber. Subsequently, on November 25, 2016, it incorporated the HD signal of the channel on the same channel, for fiber clients, but not for satellite clients.

On August 17, 2016, operator Vodafone TV incorporated the SD signal into channel 99 of its television service. On November 3, 2016, operator Vodafone TV incorporated the signal in HD 1080i to channel 99 of its television service.

On August 12, 2022, the channel was renamed as GOL PLAY, after this change films, series and entertainment programs were added to the programming. The reform of the channel was carried out to improve the audience levels in the time slots where sports are not broadcast, however, the transmission of events and sports information continued to be the fundamental points of the channel's grid.

Initially, the channel planned to stop broadcasting on DTT on June 10, 2025, to focus exclusively on pay-TV operators and sports programming. However, the cessation of broadcasts was postponed until June 17, 2025. On June 18, 2025, the channel ceased its broadcasts on DTT, began broadcasting exclusively on pay-TV platforms, and changed its name to Gol.

Finally, on October 1, 2026, the channel bid farewell after nearly 20 years under the same brand that had defined it. The transition took place around 2:30 a.m., following the conclusion of a rebroadcast of the boxing match between Bashman and Bush. As the broadcast ended and a home-shopping segment began, the logo for the new channel—Replay—was displayed; this channel retains some of the original programming that had long been a hallmark of Gol since its inception.

== Programming ==
=== Current ===
==== Football ====
===== Soccer =====
- FIFA
  - Men's:
    - FIFA World Cup (2014, returned for 2022)
    - FIFA U-20 World Cup (2019 and 2022)
    - FIFA U-17 World Cup (2019 and 2022)
  - Women's
    - FIFA Women's World Cup (2019)
    - FIFA U-20 Women's World Cup (2020 and 2022)
    - FIFA U-17 Women's World Cup (2020 and 2022)
- UEFA:
  - Men's
    - UEFA Europa League (2018-2021)
  - Women's
    - UEFA Women's Champions League (selected matches, include final 2018-2021)
- LFP:
  - Men's
    - La Liga
    - Segunda División
    - División de Honor Juvenil de Fútbol
  - Women's
    - Liga Iberdrola
    - Copa de la Reina de Fútbol (selected matches, exclude final)
- International Champions Cup

===== Futsal =====
- FIFA:
  - FIFA Futsal World Cup (2020)
- UEFA:
  - UEFA Futsal Champions League (final four only)

==== Beach soccer ====
- FIFA
  - FIFA Beach Soccer World Cup (2019 and 2021)

==== Other sports(from 2016) ====
===== Combat sports =====
- ONE Championship

====== Mixed martial arts ======
- UFC
- Bellator MMA
- M-1 Challenge

====== Kick boxing ======
- Enfusion

====== Boxing ======
- Matchroom
- Golden Boy
- Premier Boxing Champions

===== Padel =====
- World Padel Tour

===== Hockey =====
====== Ice ======
- NHL

====== Field ======
- FIH Men's and Women's Hockey Pro League (Spain games only)

===== Gridiron football =====
- NFL

===== Extreme sports =====
- X Games

== Other programs ==
=== Current ===
- Directo Gol
- El Golazo de Gol
- Los Infiltrados
- Gol Sports

=== Former ===
- Gol Noticias
- Planeta Axel
- Informe Gol TV
- Goles Liga BBVA
- Estrellas del Gol
- Premier World

== See also ==
- Mediapro
- beIN Sports Spain
