= BeIN Media Group =

Independent global sport and entertainment network

beIN Media Group, LLC
- Logo since 2014
- Native name: مجموعة بي إن الإعلامية
- Romanized name: Majmū‘at Bī’in al-I‘lāmiyyah
- Type: State-owned
- Industry: Television; cinema
- Founded: 1 January 2014; 12 years ago (as beIN Media Group)
- Headquarters: Doha, Qatar
- Area served: Worldwide
- Key people: Nasser Al-Khelaifi (chairman); Yousef Al-Obaidly (CEO)
- Products: Pay television, pay-per-view and new media
- Brands: beIN SPORTS; beIN GOURMET; beIN MOVIES; beIN SERIES; beIN DRAMA; Jeem TV; Baraem; beJunior; TOD (streaming platform)
- Owner: State of Qatar
- Number of employees: 2,500+
- Subsidiaries: Digiturk; Miramax (51%)
- Website: www.beinmediagroup.com

beIN Media Group, LLC (/ˈbiːɪn/; Arabic: مجموعة بي إن الإعلامية, romanized: Majmū‘at Bī’in al-I‘lāmiyyah) is a Qatari state-owned global sport and entertainment network headquartered in Doha. beIN distributes entertainment, live sports action, and major international events across 5 continents, in 43 countries, and 7 languages spanning Europe, North America, Asia, Australia and the Middle East and North Africa (MENA).

== Ownership ==
beIN Media Group is owned and funded by the state of Qatar.

== History ==
The beIN Sports brand was first launched in June 2012 by Al Jazeera Media Network as "beIN SPORTS France", followed by "beIN SPORTS Americas" and "beIN SPORTS Asia". According to the group, Al Jazeera disassociated itself "from all its sports activities" in December 2013, and in January 2014, beIN Media Group was established and became the new owner of all Al Jazeera Sport channels, which were rebranded to "beIN SPORTS".

In October 2014, it was announced that beIN Media Group had agreed to acquire pay-TV sports channel Setanta Sports Australia, with Setanta being rebranded as beIN Sports Australia.

In 2015, beIN Sports launched an HD channel specially dedicated to football in Spain. The group declared in November 2015 that it would be expanding from sports-only programming to include entertainment and movies as well.

It was announced in January 2016 that beIN Media Group secured an agreement with Turner Broadcasting System, allowing it exclusive rights to broadcast a number of Turner-licensed entertainment and news channels across the Middle East and North Africa. beIN Media Group has since signed strategic partnerships with BBC Studios, Warner Bros., CBS, DreamWorks Animation, and Discovery.

It was rumored in November 2015 that beIN Media Group were interested in purchasing Miramax. On 1 March 2016, beIN Media Group announced its full acquisition of Miramax from Filmyard Holdings. A 49% interest in Miramax was sold to ViacomCBS (now Paramount Skydance Corporation) in April 2020.

It was announced in August 2016 that beIN Media Group acquired Turkish pay TV service Digiturk. In November 2019, beIN Media acquired exclusive broadcast rights for the 2019 and 2020 FIFA Club World Cup.

Following the Covid-19 crisis, beIN is implementing a layoff plan for its activities in the Middle East and North Africa.

== Anti-piracy campaign ==
=== beoutQ ===
In August 2017 beoutQ was launched, illegally broadcasting premium sports and entertainment content worth billions of dollars via satellite and streaming over the internet. beIN Media Group has campaigned with leading sporting organizations and broadcasters from around the world to universally condemn piracy operations and call for decisive action to be taken to stamp out beoutQ and stop Saudi-based pay TV provider Arabsat from distributing the illegal broadcast channel.

In October 2018, beIN Media Group launched a $1 billion international arbitration case against Saudi Arabia on the basis of beoutQ. In July 2018, FIFA, the Asian Football Confederation (AFC) and other sports rights holders disclosed that they will be launching legal action in Saudi Arabia.

In December 2018, The World Trade Organization agreed to launch a dispute inquiry to determine whether Saudi Arabia has failed to protect Intellectual Property rights because of beoutQ.

== See also ==
- beIN Channels Network
