= General Satellite =

Manufacturer of television set-top boxes, based in Saint Petersburg, Russia

GS Group
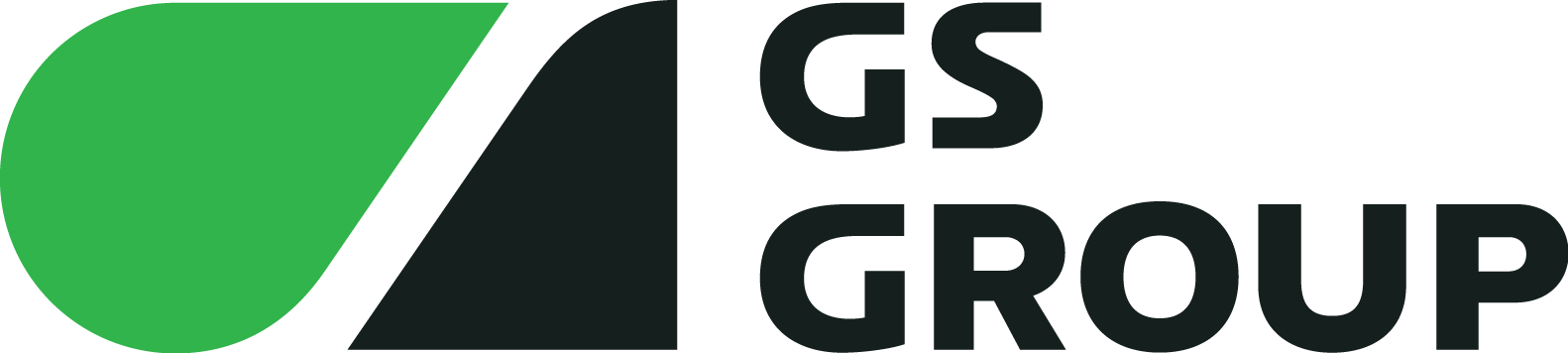
- Type: Joint-stock company
- Industry: Telecommunications
- Founded: 1991
- Headquarters: Saint Petersburg, Russia
- Key people: Andrey Tkachenko
- Services: Development of radio electronic equipment and system solutions, radio electronic equipment production engineering, implementation of Technopolis GS investment project
- Website: en.gs-group.com

GS Group (before 2013 known as General Satellite) is the largest Russian developer and producer of set-top boxes for television. Since 1991 the company has been conducting systematic research and development work and producing radio electronic equipment. Its products and technology concepts are used in satellite broadcasting projects NTV-PLUS, Tricolor TV, Platform HD etc. and the total number of TV subscribers using set-top boxes produced by the company in Russia exceeds 7 million. In 2007 General Satellite became the main investor of the integral innovation project: "Technopolis GS: scientific and technological development territory", which is implemented in Gusev town, Kaliningrad Region. It was a major contractor for NTV-PLUS company in 90s in Russia.

== History ==
- 1991 - year of foundation of the company. It was mostly active in the sales and installation of satellite TV systems.
- 1994 – signing agreements for exclusive sale of equipment with Pace Micro Technology (UK, until 2015) and Humax (S. Korea) companies. Company became supplier of satellite, cable and terrestrial TV equipment, and, particularly, the only Russian supplier of large-diameter antennas.
- 1995–1997 – the company was contracted to set-up NTV-PLUS television company facilities. It became the general distributor of the equipment for viewing NTV-PLUS channels.
- 2001 – the company has created Scientific and Research Division.
- 2003 – first domestically developed receiver with own software
- February, 2005 – first Russian award for company's GS FTA-7001S digital receiver: "Best domestic (Russia, CIS, Baltic countries) development in the field of distribution and subscription equipment for satellite and cable TV".
- November, 2005 – GS TE-7010 receiver was awarded the best low-budget terrestrial receiver based on polls made by "Digital Fernsehen", Germany.
- 2005 – launch of new Russian satellite TV project called [[Tricolor TV|Tricolor TV]]
- 2007 – invesetments into building a plant for manufacturing set-top boxes in Gusev town, Kaliningrad Region.
- 2008 – invesetments "Technopolis GS: scientific and technological development territory" was developed.
- February, 2nd, 2010 – GS Group announced launching of the first 3D-broadcasting in Russia and Eastern Europe.

GS Group's old logo as General Satellite.

== Fields of activity ==
=== Development and manufacturing of all types of set-top boxes and associated software ===
General Satellite carries out its own developments in the field of system solutions for satellite television, beginning with software and motherboard production and ending with digital content and network construction.

Prospective developments department was founded in 2002. Recent developments include hardware platform on STi5518 microchip, software for all receiver types, set-top box for NTV-plus satellite operator with integrated CAS Viaccess as well as several models of satellite and terrestrial subscription TV receivers. Presently the department carries out full development cycle. Engineering staff counts 250 specialists. General Satellite conducts developments in the field of:

- satellite receivers;
- cable receivers;
- terrestrial receivers;
- IP receivers;
- specialized software and hardware solutions, as EPG (Electronic Program Guide) generators, conditional access system;
- 3D broadcasting.

=== Development of control system middleware for operators functioning (CSMW) ===
CSMW introduction became the standard for digitalization all over the world: without such device using all benefits of the switchover from analogue to digital broadcasting standard would be impossible.

GS Group CSMW is the only system developed in Russia, introduced in 2007 and tested on millions of viewers of the leading satellite TV operator, Tricolor TV (over 7 million subscribers).

More information about CSMW: see also.

=== Participation as system integrator in digital broadcasting projects ===
==== Switchover to digital format in Russian Federation ====
According to the National Program for Switchover to Digital Broadcasting Format, Russian television will be switched to the digital broadcasting by 2015. The state shall create digital television broadcasting system, in particular, provide broadcasting of a number of free-of-charge state-owned TV channels. According to expert estimation, around 50 million households and organizations in Russia shall have been supplied with set-top-boxes or new TV sets by 2015. Presently, Corporation facilities are able to produce up to 5 million set-top boxes annually with possibility to increase the capacity twice.

Production solutions:

- GS ТЕ-8511 receiver model

Receives FTA and FTV television and radio channels. Built based on standard resolution TV hardware components, supports progressive compression format MPEG-4 adopted in Russia.

- HD-9510 receiver model

Digital receiver for receiving terrestrial HDTV signal. PVR function enables recording TV programs to USB flash drives and viewing these with built-in player. Supports reception of Free-To-Air channels. PRO Crypt conditional access system is integrated in the model. Dolby Digital digital sound decoding.

==== Implementation of own 3D project ====
- February, 2nd, 2010

Launching first in Russia and Eastern Europe digital satellite 3D broadcasting.
First 3D channel in Russian and Eastern Europe becomes available for all subscribers of Platform HD satellite operator. Channel presentation took place within the framework of international telecommunications fair CSTB-2010 in Moscow.

- April, 15th, 2010

World first live 3D broadcast of the Mariinsky Theatre ballet.

GS Group arranged world first live 3D broadcast of a ballet from Concert Hall of the Mariinsky Theatre. Viewers in Russia and Europe had an opportunity to see 3D picture of the ballet live on television. Technical partners of the broadcast were Eutelsat Company, Europe's leasing satellite operator, Samsung Electronics, world's leader in digital multimedia technologies, HD Platform Company, Russian high definition television (HDTV) pay-TV operator. Broadcasting points were organized in Saint Petersburg, Moscow and Paris.

- May, 19th, 2010

London, Great Britain. World premiere of 3 DV channel.
GS Group and Valery Gergiev presented joint 3D-project at the press-conference in Barbican-centre, London. General Satellite Corporation announced the launch of its own European 3D TV channel 3DV which will be filled with different content, including the one dedicated to culture and travelling. Considerable part of channel's programs will be the Mariinsky Theatre programs. Fragments from the Mariinsky Theatre Gala Concert and Giselle ballet staged at the Mariinsky Theatre were presented in 3D during presentation before press-conference.

- June 17–19, 2010

During Petersburg Economic Forum, President of the Russian Federation D.A. Medvedev visited the exhibit of the Commission on modernization and technological development of the economy of Russia, where he watched the demonstration of Corporation's developments in the field of 3D TV, namely, the first Russian 3D channel – 3DV.

== GS Nanotech ==
GS Nanotech is a semiconductor fraction of the GS Group located in Gusev, Kaliningrad Oblast, working in services and products around semiconductor, especially for SSD storage. Since 2017 GS Natotech launched mass SSD storage productions in the 2.5" form factor with SATA interface, the following years SSD's in M.2 in Sata and PCIe form factors.

== Partners ==
- Tricolor TV is the Russia's largest satellite TV, and most quickly growing satellite TV in the world. As for beginning of August 2010, over 6.5 millions of families were among its subscribers, i.e. around 80% from the total number of Russian digital TV users. Tricolor TV subscribers are connected and served based on CMW developed by General Satellite. General Satellite Corporation is developer and producer of set-top boxes for this project as well.
- NTV-plus is the second largest satellite TV operator in Russia. General Satellite Corporation manufactures digital TV set-top boxes which are officially recommended for viewing NTV-plus programs.
- Platform HD – Russian project of broadcasting HDTV channel package specializing in different subjects. Platform HD package is broadcast from the satellite on European territory of Russia and rebroadcast by leading operators via cable networks.

== Sponsorship and patronage ==
GS Group has been taking part in organization and support of different projects in the field of modern art for many years. These include arranging award in the field of leading-edge technologies, holding different exhibitions and events, including those connected with introduction of hi-tech in the field of culture. Company is a longtime partner and participant of International Artistic Fair Art Moscow.

== TV Piracy ==
The General Satellite was actively fight copyright infringement attempts. The company is an associated member of European Association for the Protection of Encrypted Works and Services (AEPOC). According to General Satellite information, up to 25% of satellite receivers in Russia are unauthorized.

GS Group representatives consider that the main problem of infringement is not content, but rather ways of accessing the content, and suggest that as the share of pay-TV in Russia increases, the degree of unlicensed use will grow as well.
