= NPO "Digital Television Systems" =

- Type: Joint-stock company
- Industry: Electronics
- Founded: 2007
- Headquarters: Gusev, Russia
- Key people: Zakharov S.I. (General Director)
- Services: production of household appliances and electronic equipment
- Revenue: $13 million (2017)
- Operating income: $1.19 million (2017)
- Net income: $278,475 (2017)
- Total assets: $11.2 million (2017)
- Total equity: $1.74 million (2017)
- Website: www.dtvs.ru (en)

NPO "Digital Television Systems" (DTS) «НПО «Цифровые Телевизионные Системы» is an enterprise for various equipment and devices assembling for a wide range of purposes (from office equipment to the military and medical equipment of the highest quality). The plant utilizes full production cycle: from initial installation to complete assembly, testing and packaging of the finished products.

DTS is part of GS Group and Technopolis GS.

== History ==
The Company was founded in 2007 on the basis of the Kaliningrad special economic zone. The primary investments sum exceeded 250 million rubles.

The original concept of development has included receivers production for receiving the satellite and terrestrial TV digital broadcasts. Along with this, it was planned to build radio-electronics "on order."

In 2008, the initial design and construction phase for DTS began. The company also began working with and trading the radio-electronic equipment of public company “Concern “Innovative Technology” (also known as 'General Satellite').

The Company was actively building its production capacity and - over a couple of years - managed to make a huge leap. In 2010, the daily throughput of assembly lines amounted to 3,000 boards. The automated assembly performance was 25000 components per hour; handmade assembly productivity comprised 60000 components per hour. DTS partnered with Samsung electronics that year.

Also in 2010, DTS became registered with the United Nations Procurement Division.

In 2013, DTS won the "For the reduction of occupational accidents and occupational diseases in the production sector organizations” prize at the "Russian organization of high social efficiency" in Kaliningrad.

According to Andrey Tkachenko, the President of the GSO, the plant can produce any type of equipment - from TV-sets to cell phones and handhelds with the GLONASS reception – provided there is an order. In this case, the customer provides the initial components for the assembly.

== Russian television digitalization ==
One of the most ambitious projects that involved NGOs DTN is the digitalization of Russian television. For instance, the Company management and the Kaliningrad region administration signed an agreement in February 2010 on cooperation between the parties, which aims to "achieve by 2015 a full digital broadcasting coverage of the Kaliningrad region and two public channel packages launch."

"The fact that there appeared the Company, and the Region management provided proper conditions for the Company’s operation and has undertaken measures to reduce the receiver price for the low-income residents of the region gave us the opportunity to include Kaliningrad in the program without increasing the federal spending plan," said Sergey Ivanov, who visited the Plant together with Kaliningrad Governor Georgy Boos and the Communications Minister Igor Shchyogolev.
