= Music Box (TV channel) =

Former pan-European cable and satellite music television channel (1984–1987)

- Country: United Kingdom
- Broadcast area: Europe

Ownership
- Owner: The Music Channel Limited consisting of: Thorn EMI; Virgin Vision; Yorkshire Television

History
- Launched: March 30, 1984; 42 years ago
- Closed: January 30, 1987; 39 years ago
- Replaced by: Super Channel

Music Box was a pioneering pan-European 24-hour cable and satellite television channel that ran from 29 March 1984 to 30 January 1987, and was operated first by 'The Music Channel Limited'. It was originally one of three services (along with Premiere and The Children's Channel) that formed Thorn EMI's venture into satellite television as a British version of MTV, and later became part of Virgin Vision as one of Richard Branson's business ventures launched in 1983.

Thorn EMI withdrew from the operating company 'The Music Channel Ltd.' in 1986. Virgin Vision became the majority shareholder for a short time. At the same time, a majority of the British ITV broadcasters offered to acquire shares of the channel in order to create the full-service Super Channel, replacing Music Box on January 30th 1987.

In parallel, the production company 'Music Box Ltd.' was founded, which produced music programs for Super Channel and other television stations in Europe and other continents. The operating company of Super Channel initially retained the name 'The Music Channel Ltd.' and was renamed to 'Super Channel Ltd.' in 1988.

A special Italian version of Music Box was created in the spring of 1988, and some other shows were also re-transmitted by Japanese broadcaster NHK.

The network was originally based in the heart of London, in a building where Virgin Vision and Super Channel were also based, and later gave home to the offices of CNN International until 2007. The address during the satellite years was 19-21 Rathbone Place.

== History ==
=== Background ===
As a 24-hour television channel during the 1980s, Music Box was able to reach 60 million potential viewers in Europe and the Middle East thanks to satellite distribution. At the time, a satellite dish and receiver were very expensive and for this reason had better viewing figures in countries where cable television was already used such as Belgium, Denmark, France, West Germany, Ireland, Luxembourg, the Netherlands, Switzerland and the United Kingdom.

It was said to have made a small contribution to the overthrow of eastern European communist regimes as its prime, it was illegally watched by young Europeans living in those countries using makeshift satellite systems, and it gave many young people their first view of life in the rest of Europe.

=== Operation ===
The creator of Thorn EMI's three satellite channels as director of programmes was Julian Mounter, who joined Music Box from Thames Television. Recognising that income for satellite television would be slow in coming, Mounter set about negotiating revolutionary union deals to enable the use of smaller crews in the studio and on location, commandeered a boardroom at the headquarters of Thorn EMI as one of the studios and a small basement on Shaftesbury Avenue, and it was there that many of the programmes were made before better facilities were found. The channels broke new ground in graphics, promotions, presentation and set standards within practices still followed today. Mounter left in 1986 to become director general of Television New Zealand, and the three channels then took on individual senior management. Directors on the channel included Rob Jones, who took over from Mounter as director of programmes, Geoffrey Davies, Rod Fairweather, John Leach, Peter G Grattan, Les Harris, Ludo Graham, Simon Sanders and Siubhan Richmond, as Carol McGiffin was part of the production team.

In February 1986, Thorn EMI's 50% stake in Music Box owner, The Music Channel, was sold to fellow shareholder, Virgin Group, for £600,000.

On 9 August 1986, the Yorkshire Television region of the UK's ITV decided to go 24 hours a day and filled its entire nighttime period until 6am with a simulcast of Music Box.

In the 1986 Smash Hits readers poll, Music Box ranked sixth in the "Best Music TV Programme" category.

On 30 January 1987, the last music video that played was "Don't Give Up" by Peter Gabriel and Kate Bush, whether this song is also shown before closed early from the defunct satellite network Europa TV three months prior. Shortly after the service ceased for the final time, Super Channel launches on the same frequency which previously used by Music Box on pan-European satellite Eutelsat I F-1 (ECS-1) located at 13° east, replaced during the year by Eutelsat I F-4 (ECS-4). For this reason, Music Box stopped being a 24-hour television channel and Virgin set up Music Box as an independent producer of music programmes, continuing to broadcast its shows until the end of September 1987 for ten hours a day on Super Channel. From October 1987 until January 1990, it was reduced from ten hours a day to just a couple of hours a day of music programmes to be produced for Super Channel, with a two-month long break in late 1988 due to problems related to the sale of this service.

=== Later years ===
Music Box ended its satellite broadcasts in January 1990 with the last pan-European showing of The Power Hour, it became a specialised producer of music shows for major British broadcasters and is now owned by Tinopolis, which also owns the firm Sunset + Vine, previously the owner of Music Box.

The company's best-known programmes of this period are the late night ITV show Forever, which features pop videos and interview clips from the recently stock footage, and the Capital One dance music show Mixmag TV which they produced on 1 November 2001, following their move from Rapture TV that previous day.

== Programming ==
=== As a pan-European satellite channel (1984–1990) ===
- Transmission – indie music with Rachel Davies, Simon Potter and later with Pat Sharp (1989)
- The Power Hour – hard rock, metal with Dante Bonutto and Amanda Redington, later with Alison Craig, Jacky Lynn and Nikki Groocock (1986–1987)
- It's Simon Potter – music mix and music news (1988)
- Sunday Cinema – all about the latest movies with Sunie Fletcher (1986)
- Sunday Smooch – music ballads and romance with Gloria Thomas or Amanda Redington (1986–1987), later renamed to The Smooch (1988)
- Eurochart – the official Music & Media magazine's European Hot 100 singles chart from Amsterdam with Dutch presenter Erik de Zwart (1986–1987)
- Countdown – charts from Europe and live performances from Amsterdam with Dutch presenters Erik de Zwart and Adam Curry (1987)
- Off the Wall – fashion and trends from London with Steve Blacknell (1986), later with Simon Potter and Sunie Fletcher (1987–1988)
- The Gaz Bag – with Gareth Jones (also known as Gaz Top)
- The Shadow
- One Night Stand – live concerts (1984–1987)
- The Maggot – with Timmy Mallett (1986)
- Music Box Live – live from the Music Box studios in London which include new videos, competitions and regular features originally with Simon Potter, and later with Nino Firetto also produced as Pepsi Live (1987)
- Chart Attack – the UK Top 40 singles chart usually with Simon Potter (1986–1988), occasionally with Mark Webster (1987), and Tony Gregory (1989)
- Boogie Box – dance videos with Martin Buchanan (1987), with Michaela Strachan or Steve Walsh (1988)
- Rockin' at the Speed of Light – a chat with an artist on a fake beach in the Music Box studio and videos with Sunie Fletcher, and sometimes with Tony Dortie (1987)
- The Face – music videos with Alison Craig (1987)
- The Buzz – press review, news and videos with Tony Dortie (1987)
- Mug with Marty – music videos with Martin Buchanan (1986)
- Private Eyes – music interviews by Sunie Fletcher (1986)
- Music Box Special – interviews and special events (1987)
- The Amanda Redington Show – music videos, later renamed Supersonic (1987)
- Supersonic – music videos with Amanda Redington and also Barbie Wilde (1987–1988, which is not to be confused with the 1970s ITV show of the same name)
- American Storm - the latest videos from America with Simon Potter (1986)
- Backtracks – classic videos (1985–1986)
- Videopix – video request show with Martin Buchanan and Simon Potter (1984–1987), later with Nino Firetto (1987–1988)
- Non-Stop Dance Hour – dance videos with Gloria Thomas (1986)
- Global Chart Show – weekly show featuring singles and albums chart from the whole world (1989)
- Tracking – music videos and press reviews usually with Tony Dortie, and occasionally with Nicky Campbell (1987–1988)
- The Rock of Europe – interviews (1988)
- Rockin' in the UK – indie music with Simon Potter and a little help from Rachel Davies (1988)
- Totally Live – formerly known as Music Box Live and Pepsi Live with Nino Firetto (late 1987), and occasionally with Nicky Campbell, Simon Potter, Anthea Turner or Timmy Mallett (1988)
- Nino Firetto – guests, features such as "Papa Luigi", music videos and news, live from the Music Box "living room" (1988)
- Music Box News – the latest music news with Sunie Fletcher, Alison Craig or Andy Bird – a feature of Music Box Live, Pepsi Live and later Totally Live. Paul McKenna made his television debut as the presenter of Music Box News.
- Formula One – charts from Europe and performances from the German show Formel Eins, with John Leslie who made his television debut (late 1987 and 1988)
- European Top 40 – the European singles chart with Amanda Redington (1988–1989)
- Coca-Cola Rockfile – big events around Europe, monthly show with Simon Potter and Amanda Redington (1988)
- Supertime Club – mix of cartoons and music videos for younger viewers with Catherine Kirkwood and Mark Chase (1988)
- Rox Box – interviews and specials co-produced with Belgian broadcaster RTBF and hosted by Ray Cokes (early 1987), who went later to MTV Europe and by Lucienne also from RTBF

=== For other British broadcasters (1990–2007) ===
- BPM
- Raw Power – hard rock and metal show previously known as The Power Hour from the satellite years presented by Phil Alexander, Steve 'Krusher' Joule, his dog Bullseye, and Ann Kirk (for ITV, 1990–1997)
- Noisy Mothers (new name for Raw Power)
- Club Nation (for ITV, 1997)
- Pop Down the Pub (for ITV, 1998)
- Vivid
- Sussed! (produced for Nickelodeon)
- Buzz (produced for Channel 4)
- Transmission – indie music videos (continuing on ITV after the satellite era of Music Box)
- Soundtrax – ten-minute music shows (for ITV)
- With...
- ...Forever (for ITV)
- Music with Attitude
- Popped in Crashed Out (for ITV)
- Kerrang! Awards
- L¡VE
- Mixmag TV

== Presenters ==
The following presenters have all been employed by Music Box either as presenters or VJs:

- Adam Curry
- Alison Craig
- Amanda Redington
- Andy Bird (later involved with the Disney Channel)
- Ann Kirk
- Anthea Turner
- Barbie Wilde
- Catherine Kirkwood
- Dante Bonutto
- Diana Harris
- Julie Brown
- Eddie Kid
- Erik de Zwart
- Gareth Jones (also known as Gaz Top, later a presenter on The Children's Channel)
- Gary Crowley
- Gloria Thomas
- Jacky Lynn
- John Leslie
- Leigh Francis
- Mark Chase
- Mark Webster
- Martin Buchanan
- Michaela Strachan
- Naomi Ryan
- Nicky Campbell
- Nikki Groocock
- Nino Firetto
- Pat Fish
- Pat Sharp
- Paul Cooke (previously Capital Radio)
- Paul Kaye
- Paul McKenna
- Phil Alexander
- Philip Scott
- Rachel Davies
- Ray Cokes
- Sam Wilson
- Simon Potter (later a producer for the company and Sunset+Vine)
- Steve Blacknell
- Steve 'Krusher' Joule (and his heavy metal hunting hound Bullseye)
- Steve Walsh
- Sunie Fletcher (previously at NME magazine, in the 1990s at MTV Europe as an employee)
- Timmy Mallett
- Tony Dortie
- Tony Gregory (later a television director and producer)

Some presenters also recorded a track and video for a song called "Back to the Rhythm" under the name of The Rap Pack in December 1986, they were: Nino Firetto, Amanda Redington, Gloria Thomas, Timmy Mallett, Steve Blacknell, Simon Potter and Martin Buchanan.

== See also ==
- List of European television stations
- Timeline of cable television in the United Kingdom
- Lifestyle Satellite Jukebox
- The Power Station
- The Box
- CMT Europe
- VH1
- 4Music
