= Hot Bird =

French satellite company

Coordinates: 0°0′N 13°00′E

- Hot Bird official logo
- Country of origin: France
- Operator: Eutelsat
- Applications: Communications

Specifications
- Regime: Geostationary, 13° East

Production
- Status: Operational
- On order: 0
- Built: 13
- Launched: 13
- Operational: 3
- Retired: 9
- Lost: 1
- Maiden launch: Hot Bird 1; 28 March 1995
- Last launch: Hot Bird 13G; 3 November 2022

Hot Bird (also styled Hotbird) is a group of satellites operated by Eutelsat, located at 13°E over the equator (orbital position) and with a transmitting footprint over Asia, Europe, North Africa, Americas and the Middle East.

Only digital radio and television channels are transmitted by the Hot Bird constellation, both free-to-air and encrypted. In addition there are a few interactive and IP services. The satellites currently operate at 13° East and are numbered 13B, 13E and 13G. The satellites have been broadcasting digital-only since TV5Monde switched off its analogue signal in 2010.

== List of satellites ==
Name	Launch location	Current location	Launch date	Status
Hot Bird 1	Kourou	Junk orbit	28 March 1995	Inactive
Hot Bird 2 (Eurobird 9, Eutelsat 48A)	Cape Canaveral	Junk orbit	21 November 1996	Inactive
Hot Bird 3 (Eurobird 4)	Kourou	Junk orbit	2 September 1997	Inactive
Hot Bird 4 (Atlantic Bird 4)	Kourou	Junk orbit	27 February 1998	Inactive
Hot Bird 5 (Eutelsat 25B/Es'hail)	Cape Canaveral	Junk orbit	9 October 1998	Inactive
Hot Bird 6 (Eutelsat 70D)	Cape Canaveral	Junk orbit	21 August 2002	Inactive
Hot Bird 7	Kourou	Launch failure	11 December 2002	Failed
Hot Bird 7A (Hot Bird 13E)	Kourou	13°E	12 March 2006	Inactive
Hot Bird 8 (Hot Bird 13B)	Baikonur	13°E	4 August 2006	Inactive
Hot Bird 9 (Hot Bird 13C)	Kourou	12.5°W	20 December 2008	Inactive
Hot Bird 10 (Eutelsat 33E)	Kourou	33°E	12 February 2009	Active
Hot Bird 13F	Cape Canaveral	13°E	15 October 2022	Active
Hot Bird 13G	Cape Canaveral	13°E	3 November 2022	Active

== Satellite details ==
=== Hot Bird 1 ===
Hot Bird 1 was launched by Ariane 44LP on 28 March 1995. The 13° east slot predates the launch, with Eutelsat I F-1 having been located there as early as 1983, and Eutelsat II F-1 having also served time at the location. It has reached end-of-life.

=== Hot Bird 3 ===
Hot Bird 3 was launched by Ariane 44LP on 2 September 1997 and intended to be moved to 10°E to become Eurobird 10. During the drift from 13°E to 10°E, the satellite suffered loss of power from one solar array. It was nevertheless successfully moved to 10°E, but could only operate at a reduced capacity. Since then, it is operating at 4°E under the name Eurobird 4. At last it was moved to 75°E and renamed to ABS_1B. It has reached end-of-life.

=== Hot Bird 4 ===
Hot Bird 4 was launched by Ariane 42P on 27 February 1998 and redeployed to 7°W in July 2006, becoming Atlantic Bird 4 / Nilesat 103.

=== Hot Bird 5 ===
Hot Bird 5 was launched by Atlas-2A on 9 October 1998 and re-located to 25.5°E and renamed Eurobird 2. Six transponders are leased to Arabsat under the name Badr 2, after having been called Arabsat 2D.

=== Hot Bird 6 (Hot Bird 13D) ===
Hot Bird 6 was launched by Atlas V 401 on 21 August 2002. Starting on 12 June 2009, the day of Iranian elections, deliberate interference affecting this satellite was traced to Iran. Hot Bird 6 is the primary carrier for BBC Persian Television. As of 2013, it was replaced by Hot Bird 10 (Hot Bird 13D).

=== Hot Bird 7/7A (Hot Bird 13E) ===
Hot Bird 7 was lost in December 2002 during the Ariane 5 ECA launch. Its replacement, Hot Bird 7A (a Spacebus 3000B3) was successfully launched on 11 March 2006. Hot Bird 7A was renamed Eurobird 9A in February 2009.

In December 2011, Eutelsat announced, that their satellite assets will be renamed under a unified brand name effective from March 2012. This satellite became Eutelsat 9A. In 2016 it was renamed Hot Bird 13E.

=== Hot Bird 8 (Hot Bird 13B) ===
Hot Bird 8 was launched by Proton on 5 August 2006. With a launch mass of 4.9 tonnes, Hot Bird 8 is the largest and the most powerful broadcast satellite serving Europe.

=== Hot Bird 9 (Hot Bird 13C) ===
Hot Bird 9 was launched by Ariane 5 ECA in December 2008. Its entry into service enabled the Hot Bird 7A satellite to be redeployed to 9° East and rebranded Eurobird 9A, increasing capacity to 38 K_{u} band transponders at this orbital position. From March 2012, Hot Bird 9 became Eutelsat Hot Bird 13C and during the second quarter of 2023 Hot Bird 13G replace Hot Bird 9 at Eutelsats's 13° East position.

This satellite renamed Eutelsat 10A now is located at 10.5° East for occasional feeds, data or inactive frequency

=== Hot Bird 10 (Eutelsat 33E) ===
Hot Bird 10 was launched by Ariane 5 ECA in February 2009 with NSS-9, Spirale A and Spirale B. It was initially commissioned as Atlantic Bird 4A at 7°W. When Atlantic Bird 7 became operational, it was renamed Eutelsat 3C and was colocated with Eutelsat 3A at 3° East. Later it became Hot Bird 13D and in 2016 Eutelsat 33E. This satellite is located at 33° East.

=== Hot Bird 13F ===
Hot Bird 13F was launched by Falcon 9 Block 5 in October 2022. The launch mass of the satellite is 4,476 kg (9,868 lb). The satellite has been produced by Airbus Defence and Space and based on Eurostar Neo bus. The satellite is designed to use PPS5000 plasma propulsion engine (developed by Safran and using xenon) to get to geostationary orbit.

=== Hot Bird 13G ===
Hot Bird 13G was launched by Falcon 9 Block 5 in November 2022. The satellite is very similar to Hot Bird 13F. Hot Bird 13G is active and replaces satellite 13C at orbital position 13°E.

== Packages broadcast on Hot Bird ==
- (France) Bis TV
- (France) Eurosport
- (France) Globecast
- (Switzerland) Kabelio
- (Poland) Platforma Canal+
- (Poland) Polsat Box
- (Cyprus) NOVA Greece
- (Poland) Orange Polska
- (Italy) Sky Italia
- (Belgium) TéléSAT
- (Italy) Tivùsat
- Viasat Ukraine
- (Bulgaria) Vivacom
- (England) CNBC Europe
- EUMETCast Satellite

=== Free-to-air channels ===
Up to 300 television and radio channels are available free-to-air.
