= EUMETCast =

EUMETCast is a method of disseminating various (mainly satellite based) meteorological data operated by the European Organisation for the Exploitation of Meteorological Satellites (EUMETSAT). The main purpose is the dissemination of EUMETSAT's own data, but various data from other providers are broadcast as well. EUMETCast is a contribution to GEONETCast and IGDDS (WMO's Integrated Global Data Dissemination Service) and provides data for GEOSS and GMES.

== Services ==
EUMETCast satellite includes data and derived products from the geostationary Meteosat satellites, Meteosat-7 (over the Indian Ocean), 8, 9 and 10 and the Metop-A, B & C and NOAA polar orbiting satellites, plus data from other meteorological programmes, such as Jason-2 (the Ocean Surface Topography Mission).

Examples of data and products on EUMETCast satellite:

- Space-based observations from the Meteosat, Metop, Jason-2 satellites. At their most frequent, these data are delivered to users within five minutes of processing.
- Land application products covering Europe, Africa and South America.
- Global and regional marine meteorological and ocean surface products.
- Atmospheric chemistry products

A range of third-party meteorological and environmental products are also available. The range includes:

- Level 1 satellite data and derived products from a range of atmospheric, marine and land monitoring satellites (e.g. GOES-E & GOES-W, S-NPP, Himawari, FY2, Saral, Mega-Tropiques Aqua/Terra MODIS, Sentinel)
- European Commission Copernicus and FP7 funded data and products
- In-situ observational data
- Numerical weather forecasts

In 2016 EUMETSAT started a demonstration EUMETCast Terrestrial service, which sends multicast satellite data in Europe via the National Research and Education Network (NRENs) and the GÉANT infrastructure. Only organisations eligible for access to a NRENs can access the service, if the NREN supports multicasting.

The terrestrial service will re-use components familiar to users of the EUMETCast satellite service and then, as for EUMETCast satellite, subscribes to the related multicast channels to receive the data.

== Transmission technology ==
EUMETCast uses the DVB-S MPEG2 stream for encapsulating IP frames (IP over DVB). At this IP layer, IP Multicast techniques are used for distributing the file based content. For this purpose, TelliCast (an IP multicast software from Newtec (formerly Tellitec)) is used. In 2014 EUMETCast was migrated to a DVB-S2 transponder, which allows for higher bandwidth rates, and in 2017 a second DVB-S2 transponder was added for the European service providing Sentinel satellite data.

Transmission is via Eutelsat's Hot Bird 13F and 13G satellites (in K_{u} band), Eutelsat's 5 WEST A satellite (C band) and SES-6 (C band).

Eutelsat Hot Bird 13F and 13G supply coverage across Europe, North Africa and the Middle East. Eutelsat 5 supplies European African and western Asia coverage. SES-6 is located at 319.5º East, its tailored, high-powered hemispheric beam provides simultaneous coverage of both Europe and the Americas.

The technology used makes it possible for end users to receive the data with regular off-the-shelf satellite TV equipment and a PC.

== Licensing ==
The data policy distinguishes between essential and licensed data. Generally data may be used free of charge for scientific, educational or personal purposes, however for receiving licensed data registration is necessary and a hardware key (€ 40) has to be bought in order to decrypt the content. A License for the TelliCast client software must be obtained for € 60. From February 2019, for all country, these items are available from EUMETSAT at no charge .
