= Europa TV =

Former pan-European television network (1985–1986)

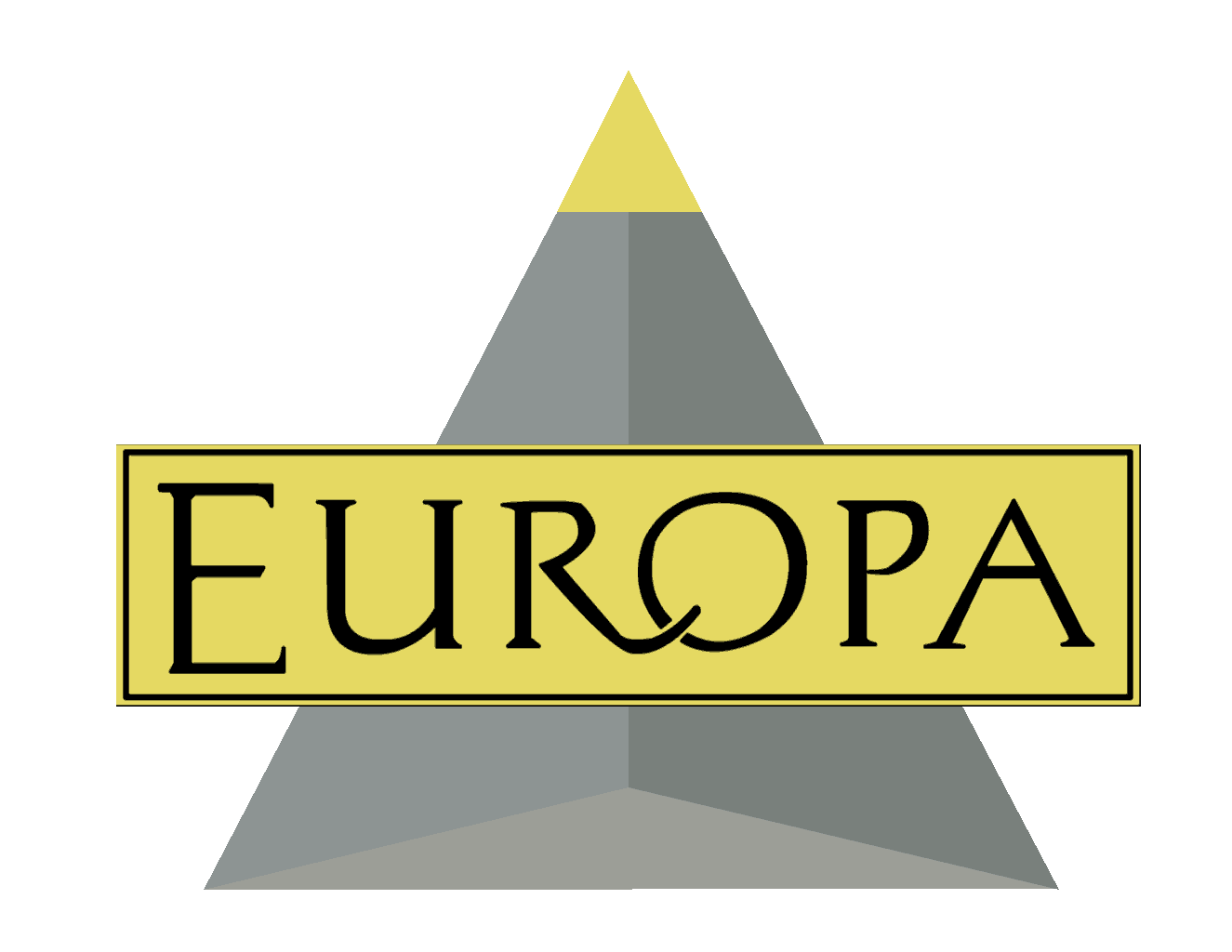
- Country: Ireland; Italy; Netherlands; Portugal; West Germany
- Broadcast area: Europe
- Transmitters: ECS-1 satellite; cable; terrestrial network (Portugal)

Programming
- Languages: Dutch; English; German; Italian; Portuguese
- Picture format: 4:3 PAL

Ownership
- Owner: Consortium of ARD, NOS, RAI, RTÉ and RTP

History
- Launched: 5 October 1985; 40 years ago
- Closed: 29 November 1986; 39 years ago

Europa TV, originally known as Olympus, was a pan-European television network operated by a consortium of five public service broadcasters from Ireland (RTÉ), Italy (RAI), the Netherlands (NOS), Portugal (RTP) and West Germany (ARD). It was distributed via satellite and cable, as well as via terrestrial television in Portugal.

== History ==
=== Background ===
The Europa TV project originally launched under the name Olympus, referencing its intended direct-to-home distribution via the Olympus-1 satellite, starting from 1987. Its creation followed the Eurikon experiment of 1982, in which several European broadcasters collaborated on a five-week closed-circuit trial service, designed to explore the feasibility of a transnational television channel. Building on that model, Olympus aimed to offer regular programming with multilingual accessibility and contributions from multiple public broadcasters.

Its operations were based in Hilversum, Netherlands, under the leadership of Klaas Jan Hindriks. Public test transmissions began in 1985, using the existing ECS-1 satellite. Because only one audio channel was available at the time, the test broadcasts alternated between several languages. The network's first full day of test programming took place on 5 May 1985, beginning at 10:00 (CEST) with a Dutch broadcast of the Eurovision Song Contest 1985, which was held the previous day but not shown live in the Netherlands due to the Remembrance of the Dead commemorations.

Later that year, the project was forced to change its name when the Japanese electronics company Olympus threatened legal action over the use of its trademark. A proposed alternative name, Olympsat, was also rejected for being too similar. The channel ultimately adopted the name Europa TV, officially launching under that title on 5 October 1985. According to the station's representatives, the choice of 'Europa' (rather than 'Europe') reflected the continent's historically recognised name across languages.

=== Operations ===
Europa TV broadcast daily in cooperation with the European Broadcasting Union (EBU) and the public broadcasters ARD, NOS, RAI, RTÉ and RTP. France declined to participate, because it already used TV5 and the TDF 1 satellite for international broadcasts. The channel offered multiple audio tracks for simultaneous translation, allowing viewers to follow programmes in their preferred language. In addition, subtitling in different languages was provided through teletext. Unlike traditional public service broadcasting, Europa TV carried commercial advertising to generate revenue. However, this model proved ineffective for a channel with such a diverse and geographically scattered audience, which made it difficult for advertisers to target specific demographics.

Among the participating countries, only the Dutch government and NOS provided financial support. All partner broadcasters supplied programming, often material already aired on their national channels, though some content was produced specifically for Europa TV. On 29 November 1986, the channel was forced to shut down due to low viewership and severe financial difficulties. The three-year budget had been exhausted, and the other participating countries refused to contribute their share. RTÉ expressed interest in relaunching the service, but the initiative stalled within the EBU.

== Programmes ==
Programmes broadcast on Europa TV included:

- Worldwatch, a five-minute current affairs programme with voice-over in Dutch, English, German and Portuguese;
- Weather forecasts for EEC member states, Finland, Norway, and Sweden;
- An international spin-off of the Dutch music programme Countdown, presented by Adam Curry.

=== Preservation ===
The Netherlands Institute for Sound and Vision started ongoing preservation efforts of Europa TV broadcasts on 29 August 2018, recovering recordings from about 300 VHS tapes from their archives, 400 Betamax tapes from RTP, and documents from RTÉ, RAI, and Klaas Jan Hindriks.

== See also ==
- List of European television stations
- International broadcasting
- Arte
- BBC TV Europe
- Euronews
- Eurosport
- Music Box
- NBC Europe (formerly Super Channel)
- Screensport
- Sky Television
