= Raw Power (disambiguation) =

Raw Power is a 1973 album by The Stooges.

Raw Power may also refer to:

- Raw Power, a 1997 song by English electronic music group Apollo 440
- Raw Power, a 1999 album by Trey Gunn
- Raw Power (band), an Italian hardcore band
- Raw Power (TV series), a British heavy metal television show from the 1990s
