= Raw Power (TV series) =

Television series

Raw Power was a weekly heavy metal/rock music television programme, with connections to Raw magazine, and produced by Music Box Ltd, which aired in Britain on ITV from 1990 until 1993. The name was eventually changed to Noisy Mothers which aired nationwide in 1994 and 1995 and the format of the show changed. The show was axed in late 1995, to make way for an overhaul of scheduling.

== Origins ==
Before the advent of rock-focused satellite television stations such as MTV2 and Kerrang!, heavy metal and rock music in general, got very little airplay on British national network television. Featuring live performances, music videos, interviews, and competitions (all with a heavy metal theme), the show aired in the early hours of Saturday mornings (sometime between midnight and 3:00 am) and sought to redress the balance.

Before Raw magazine got involved, the show was known as The Power Hour, initially presented by Dante Bonutto and Amanda Redington, and later by Alison Craig, Jacky Lynn, and Nikki Groocock. It used to be shown from 1985 to 1990 on the cable and satellite music channel Music Box, which stopped being a channel on its own to become the producer of music shows for major British broadcasters, including ITV.

The theme tune of Raw Power was an edited version of the guitar solo from "Love in an Elevator" by Aerosmith. The show was filmed at The Marquee in London and various locations across the country, in Europe and the United States. Megadeth and Pantera were also used as theme tunes on Raw Power and Noisy Mothers.

== Presenters ==
Originally presented by Phil Alexander (then editor of Raw magazine) and Nikki Groocock, the show was later featured Ann Kirk, replacing Nikki Groocock in mid-1991. Ann Kirk produced the later episodes of The Power Hour and created and produced Raw Power and Noisy Mothers. Phil Alexander was replaced by Steve 'Krusher' Joule as presenter, who also appeared in a segment entitled "Krusher's Kouch" (later in Noisy Mothers' "Krusher's Kosmos"). Andrew Nicholson and Jerry Duller directed the show. Camera work was by John Keedwell, who went on after the show closed to produce the Bon Jovi Access All Areas, a documentary film of their world tour from 1988 to 1989. The segment would always start with Krusher's greeting of "Droogies, boozers, strumpets, and losers," featuring CD reviews, competitions, and irreverent comments. Krusher would usually be accompanied by a Jack Russell Terrier named Bullseye (which died in 1995).

Later editions also featured various bands presenting the show, including The Almighty, Thunder, Alice Cooper, Megadeth, Iron Maiden, and Motörhead. Later on, Noisy Mothers, Sepultura, Pride & Glory, Extreme, and Paradise Lost. Raw Power/Noisy Mothers would film band performances and cover the major rock festivals such as Donington Monsters of Rock and Reading. Band performances filmed include The Black Crowes, Blind Melon, and Megadeth. Raw Power and Noisy Mothers won the "Best TV Show" category in Britain's rock music magazines during its run on ITV.
