= Eutelsat I F-3 =

Decommissioned communication satellite

- Names: ECS-3; European Communications Satellite-3; Eutelsat 3
- Mission type: Communications
- Operator: ESA / Eutelsat
- Website: https://www.eutelsat.com/en/home.html
- Mission duration: 7 years (planned); Failed to orbit

Spacecraft properties
- Spacecraft: ECS-3
- Spacecraft type: ECS
- Bus: ECS-Bus
- Manufacturer: British Aerospace
- Launch mass: 1,158 kg (2,553 lb)
- Dry mass: 500 kg (1,100 lb)
- Dimensions: 1.9 m x 1.4 m x 2.3 m Span on orbit: 13.8 m
- Power: 1 kW

Start of mission
- Launch date: 12 September 1985, 23:26:00 UTC
- Rocket: Ariane 3 (V15)
- Launch site: Centre Spatial Guyanais, ELA-1
- Contractor: Arianespace
- Entered service: Failed to orbit

Orbital parameters
- Reference system: Geocentric orbit (planned)
- Regime: Geostationary orbit
- Longitude: 10° East

Transponders
- Band: 12 Ku-band
- Bandwidth: 72 MHz
- Coverage area: Europe, the Middle East and Africa

Eutelsat I F-3, also known as European Communications Satellite 3 (ECS-3) is a communications satellite that was lost after an Ariane 3 launch vehicle failure in 1985. It was the third of five satellites in the European Communications Satellite first-generation satellite programme operated by the European Telecommunications Satellite Organisation.

== History ==
The European Telecommunications Satellite Organization (Eutelsat) has been servicing the European Economic Community (CEE) since 1977, being formally established by a multi-lateral agreement in 1985. In 1979, European Space Agency (ESA) agreed to design, build, and launch five ECS (European Communications Satellite) spacecraft to be assumed by Eutelsat after on-orbit testing.

The Eutelsat I series of satellites was developed by the European Space Agency (ESA) as part of the European Communications Satellite (ECS) programme. Once launched and checked out in a geostationary orbit over Europe, each satellite was handed to Eutelsat for commercial operations. Four Eutelsat I satellites were successfully launched between 1983 and 1988 (1983, 1984, 1987, and 1988). They served both public and private traffic, including telephone services, fax, data, land mobile service, and television and radio programming. Each had a design life of 7 years and a bandwidth of 72 MHz. ECS-3 was lost in an Ariane 3 launch accident in 1985.

== Satellite description ==
The ECS-3 spacecraft had a mass at launch of 1,158 kg (2,553 lb). Constructed by British Aerospace, it was designed to be operated for seven years and carried 12 Ku-band transponders, two of which were set aside as spares. It also only had partial eclipse protection, requiring some channels to be turned off during eclipse periods around the spring and autumn equinoxes. The satellite contained a Mage-2 solid rocket motor to perform orbit circularisation at apogee.

== Launch ==
ECS-3 was launched by Arianespace, using an Ariane 3 launch vehicle, flight number V15. The launch took place at 23:26:00 UTC on 12 September 1985, from ELA-1 at Centre Spatial Guyanais, at Kourou, French Guiana. The Ariane 3 suffered a failure in its upper stage at the start of geosynchronous orbit injection, stranding the satellite in low-Earth orbit and resulting in its atmospheric reentry.
