= EUTELSAT II F-1 =

- Names: EUTELSAT 2-F1; EUTELSAT 2-F1
- Mission type: Communications
- Operator: Eutelsat Communications
- COSPAR ID: 1990-079B
- SATCAT no.: 20777
- Website: https://www.eutelsat.com/en/home.html
- Mission duration: 10 years (planned); 13 years (achieved)

Spacecraft properties
- Spacecraft: EUTELSAT II F-1
- Spacecraft type: Spacebus
- Bus: Spacebus-2000
- Manufacturer: Aérospatiale
- Launch mass: 1,875 kg (4,134 lb)
- Dry mass: 915 kg (2,017 lb)
- Dimensions: 2.8 m x 2.2 m x 2.5 m Span on orbit: 22.4 m
- Power: 3.5 kW

Start of mission
- Launch date: 30 August 1990, 22:46:00 UTC
- Rocket: Ariane 44LP H10 (V38)
- Launch site: Centre Spatial Guyanais, ELA-2
- Contractor: Arianespace
- Entered service: 24 September 1990

End of mission
- Disposal: Graveyard orbit
- Deactivated: October 2003

Orbital parameters
- Reference system: Geocentric orbit
- Regime: Geostationary orbit
- Longitude: 13° East (1990-1998); 36° East (1998-1999); 48° East (1999-2002); 76° East (2003)

Transponders
- Band: 16 Ku-band
- Bandwidth: 14/11 GHz
- Coverage area: Europe

EUTELSAT II F-1, is a decommissioned communications satellite operated by the European Telecommunications Satellite Organisation (EUTELSAT). Launched in 1990, it was operated in geostationary orbit at a longitude of 13° East, before moving to several other locations later in its operational life, before it was finally decommissioned in 2003.

== History ==
The European Telecommunications Satellite Organization (EUTELSAT) has been servicing the European Economic Community (CEE) since 1977, being formally established by a multi-lateral agreement in 1985.

The EUTELSAT II series satellites was launched in a geostationary orbit over Europe. Four EUTELSAT II satellites were successfully launched between 1990 and 1992 (1990, 1991, 1991, and 1992). They served both public and private traffic, including telephone services, fax, data, land mobile service, and television and radio programming. Each had a design life of 10 years and a bandwidth of 14/11 GHz. EUTELSAT II F-5 was lost in an Ariane 4 launch failure in 1994.

== Satellite description ==
The EUTELSAT II F-1 spacecraft, had a mass at launch of 1,875 kg (4,134 lb). Constructed by Aérospatiale, it was designed to be operated for ten years and carried 16 Ku-band transponders, with eight spares. The satellite contained a S400 solid rocket motor to perform orbit circularisation at apogee. Eutelsat II employs two, 1.6 m diameter reflectors, one on each side of the satellite bus.

== Launch ==
Eutelsat II F-1 was launched by Arianespace, using an Ariane 44LP H10 launch vehicle, flight number V38. The launch took place at 22:46:00 UTC on 30 August 1990, from ELA-2 at Centre Spatial Guyanais, at Kourou, French Guiana. Successfully deployed into geostationary transfer orbit (GTO), EUTELSAT II F-1 raised itself into an operational geostationary orbit using its apogee motor.

== Mission ==
Following commissioning operations, the EUTELSAT II F-1 satellite was moved to its operational orbital position at 13° East, entering service on 24 September 1990. The satellite was decommissioned in October 2003. It is in a graveyard orbit.
