= Eutelsat I F-2 =

- Names: ECS-2; European Communications Satellite-2; Eutelsat 2
- Mission type: Communications
- Operator: ESA / Eutelsat
- COSPAR ID: 1984-081A
- SATCAT no.: 15158
- Website: https://www.eutelsat.com/en/home.html
- Mission duration: 7 years (planned); 9 years (achieved)

Spacecraft properties
- Spacecraft: ECS-2
- Spacecraft type: ECS
- Bus: ECS-Bus
- Manufacturer: British Aerospace
- Launch mass: 1,158 kg (2,553 lb)
- Dry mass: 500 kg (1,100 lb)
- Dimensions: 1.9 m x 1.4 m x 2.3 m Span on orbit: 13.8 m
- Power: 1 kW

Start of mission
- Launch date: 4 August 1984, 13:32:54 UTC
- Rocket: Ariane 3 (V10)
- Launch site: Centre Spatial Guyanais, ELA-1
- Contractor: Arianespace
- Entered service: October 1984

End of mission
- Disposal: Graveyard orbit
- Deactivated: December 1993

Orbital parameters
- Reference system: Geocentric orbit
- Regime: Geostationary orbit
- Longitude: 7° East (1984–1990); 4° East (1990–1992); 2° East (1992–1993); 1° East (1993)

Transponders
- Band: 12 Ku-band
- Bandwidth: 72 MHz
- Coverage area: Europe, the Middle East and Africa

Eutelsat I F-2, also known as European Communications Satellite 2 (ECS-2) is a decommissioned communications satellite operated by the European Telecommunications Satellite Organisation (Eutelsat). Launched in 1984, it was operated in geostationary orbit at a longitude of 7° East, before moving to several other locations later in its operational life, before it was finally decommissioned in 1993. It was the second of five satellites launched to form the first-generation Eutelsat constellation.

== History ==
The European Telecommunications Satellite Organization (Eutelsat) has been servicing the European Economic Community (CEE) since 1977, being formally established by a multi-lateral agreement in 1985. In 1979, European Space Agency (ESA) agreed to design, build, and launch five ECS (European Communications Satellite) spacecraft to be assumed by Eutelsat after on-orbit testing.

The Eutelsat I series of satellites was developed by the European Space Agency (ESA) as part of the European Communications Satellite (ECS) programme. Once launched and checked out in a geostationary orbit over Europe, each satellite was handed to Eutelsat for commercial operations. Four Eutelsat I satellites were successfully launched between 1983 and 1988 (1983, 1984, 1987, and 1988). They served both public and private traffic, including telephone services, fax, data, land mobile service, and television and radio programming. Each had a design life of 7 years and a bandwidth of 72 MHz. ECS-3 was lost in an Ariane 3 launch accident in 1985.

== Satellite description ==
The ECS-2 spacecraft, had a mass at launch of 1,158 kg (2,553 lb). Constructed by British Aerospace, it was designed to be operated for seven years and carried 12 Ku-band transponders, two of which were set aside as spares. It also only had partial eclipse protection, requiring some channels to be turned off during eclipse periods around the spring and autumn equinoxes. The satellite contained a Mage-2 solid rocket motor to perform orbit circularisation at apogee.

== Launch ==
ECS-2 was launched by Arianespace, using an Ariane 3 launch vehicle, flight number V10. The launch took place at 13:32:54 UTC on 4 August 1984, from ELA-1 at Centre Spatial Guyanais, at Kourou, French Guiana. Successfully deployed into geostationary transfer orbit (GTO), ECS-2 raised itself into an operational geostationary orbit using its apogee motor.

== Mission ==
Following commissioning operations conducted by the European Space Agency (ESA), the Eutelsat I F-2 satellite was moved to its operational orbital position at 7° East, entering service in October 1984. The satellite was decommissioned in December 1993. It is in a graveyard orbit.
