= Eva Berneke =

Danish engineer and company executive

- Born: 22 April 1969 (age 57)
- Education: Technical University of Denmark; INSEAD
- Title: Former CEO of Eutelsat

Eva Berneke (born 22 April 1969) is a Danish engineer and company executive. She was the CEO of Eutelsat from January 2022 until May 2025.

== Biography ==
=== Early life and education ===
Berneke graduated from Technical University of Denmark in 1992, where she obtained a master's degree in mechanical engineering. She also holds an MBA from INSEAD, obtained in 1995.

=== Career ===
Berneke began her career as a consultant and partner at McKinsey in France. In 2007, she joined TDC, the main Danish telecommunications company, where she held the positions of Chief Strategy Officer in the "Mobiles" subsidiary, TDC A/S, Mobile Nordic and became Vice-Executive President until 2014. In March 2014, she became managing director of KMD, initially a local Internet provider, which became under her leadership the leading Danish software and multi-sector IT solutions company, and a subsidiary of the Japanese group NEC.

On January 1, 2022, Berneke was selected by a headhunter and took over the general management of Eutelsat, the French satellite company. Its main mission is to ensure the transition of the company from its main activity (the "video" transmission for the editors of television channels) to connectivity (Internet, services to businesses, administrations, the army, the research). She considers that the traditional space industry based on geostationary satellites, of which Eutelsat is one of the main representatives, is compatible with the new generation of "constellation" satellites such as OneWeb, in which Eutelsat became a shareholder in 2021 and which deploys an unprecedented constellation of 650 mini-satellites in low orbit to provide internet services.

Berneke is a member of the board of two iconic Danish companies, Lego and wind turbine manufacturer Vestas Wind Systems, and of the National Bank of Denmark. She is also a member of the Board of Directors of the French École polytechnique.

Less than two months after taking office as chief executive officer of Eutelsat, Eva Berneke faced a significant crisis for the company posed by Russia's invasion of Ukraine on February 24, 2022. Russia is an important market and partner for the French company which achieved 6.3% of its turnover there in 2020/2021. OneWeb was forced to cancel its scheduled March 4 launch of 36 satellites on one of Russia's Soyuz rockets after the Russian space agency Roscosmos demanded a guarantee that the technology would not be used for military purposes, and that the British government would sell its stake in the company.

The continuation of activities with two Russian pay-TV platforms, NTV Plus (subsidiary of Gazprom Media Holding) and Trikolor, remains the subject of criticism. These two platforms broadcast the main state channels (Rossiya 1, Perviy Kanal and NTV) to 15 million Russian households, but also, from the beginning of March, interrupted the transmissions of eight international news channels.

The first criticisms came from the Ukrainian press, then took on an international dimension following the action of the Denis Diderot Committee, which published a report and a petition asking for European sanctions against the two Russian customers of Eutelsat. The personal responsibility of Eva Berneke was questioned in the Danish press. Faced with the absence of a break with the Russian propaganda machine that Eva Berneke's position signifies, the influential journalist Birgitte Ehradtsten even went so far as to question the solidarity between women.

Consultant John Strand was even harsher: "As CEO of Eutelsat, Berneke had two choices: leave Russia or stay and support Putin. Berneke not only rejects the direction of the moral compass, but supports Putin's war by censoring information as it requires". Eva Berneke responds to her critics by invoking the neutrality to which her company is bound and by indicating that it is up to French and European regulators to take decisions on possible sanctions in relation to the two platforms.

The Denis Diderot Committee recognizes that the Code of Ethics of Eutelsat S.A. does indeed imply this principle of neutrality but notes that the Russian platforms do not respect the principles of pluralism enshrined in the Convention of the intergovernmental organization EUTELSAT IGO, that the main channels broadcast by the two platforms contain war propaganda or even incitement to genocide, and that Eva Berneke has obviously not asked the regulators to allow the termination of contracts with her two problematic clients.

In July 2022, the Reporters sans Frontières association also urged the leaders of Eutelsat to put an end to the collaboration with Russian propaganda.

On July 18, 2022, the Ukrainian Minister of Culture Oleksandr Tkatchenko challenged his French counterpart Rima Abdul-Malak on the question

After the unofficial announcement of the merger between Eutesalt Communications S.A. and Oneweb, an Indian source indicated that Eva Berneke will remain as CEO. The merger will not impact the collaboration between Eutelsat S.A. and its Russian clients. The UK government has obtained a veto of sales of services that pose a risk to UK national security but it is understood that the UK government hopes to evade criticism by ensuring OneWeb technology is ringfenced in a way that ensures it is not used to support channels that facilitate Kremlin propaganda.

=== Awards and recognition ===
In 2019, she received the Womenomics award which distinguishes Danish women managers.
