= Raw (music magazine) =

British music magazine (published 1988–96)

- Categories: Music
- First issue: 31 August 1988
- Final issue: 16 March 1996
- Company: EMAP
- Country: United Kingdom
- Language: English
- ISSN: 0954-156X

Raw was a British music magazine, which was published from 1988 until 1996. Established to rival Kerrang!, Raw focused on rock music for most of its history.

== Founding ==
Raw was founded in the summer of 1988 by Dante Bonutto, Malcolm Dome, Mark Putterford and Steve McTaggart and photographer Tony Mottram drafted in from Metal Hammer. They had come together on Metal Hammer magazine having split from Kerrang!, where Bonutto had been deputy-editor. The collective feeling there had been that Kerrang! was becoming too narrowly focused on heavy metal and that Metal Hammer would allow them more scope to explore other areas of rock music. This quickly proved not to be the case and the idea for a new magazine was born, a title that would be a true rock magazine, featuring heavy metal acts but not dominated by them.

To that end they teamed up with marketing man Pete Winkleman and created Raw alongside Phil Alexander, Kirk Blows, Dave Dickson, Dave Ling, Sylvie Simmons, Maura Sutton and Paul Suter, most of whom had also worked on Kerrang! under the byline of `RAW` Rock Alive Worldwide.

The first issue went on sale on 31 August that year, as a fortnightly publication, featuring Ozzy Osbourne on the cover tattooing the RAW logo on himself, photographed by Tony Mottram. RAW was based in London and steadily grew to become a serious rival to the more established Kerrang!.

== Acquisition by EMAP ==
But within the year, EMAP publications, having failed in their bid to take over Kerrang!, decided to acquire Raw instead. The idea, at that stage, remained that the new magazine could overcome the heavyweight Kerrang!, and that EMAP's money and publishing clout would allow the Raw team to achieve this. In the end, though, EMAP simply bought Kerrang! wholesale.

The original Raw magazine, the staff, writers and photographers, remained largely intact, with the addition of Liz Evans, until the end of 1989 when Dante Bonutto announced he was leaving. He had been poached as an A&R man by East West Records. The EMAP-appointed publishing director, David Hepworth, was assigned to find a new editor, and Dave Henderson was appointed.

== Decline and discontinuation ==
The beginning of 1990 ushered in a new regime and Raw established itself as a viable alternative to Kerrang!, with a fresh, more contemporary editorial approach, championing bands such as Nirvana, Soundgarden, Hole, L7 and Alice in Chains, alongside the more traditional rock stable. However, as soon as Kerrang! became part of the EMAP stable of publications, Raw's survival, like Sounds, no longer mattered and despite changes of editor and editorial policy, making Raw a Britpop magazine in December 1995, among the proliferation of music magazines during the 1990s, eventually it folded. The magazine published its last issue on 13 March 1996.

== Television programme ==
In 1990, a weekly television programme named Raw Power was launched to accompany the magazine. It later changed its name to Noisy Mothers and was defunct in late 1995.
