= Technopolis Gusev =

Human settlement in Gusevsky District, Kaliningrad Oblast, Russia

Coordinates: 54.5833°N 22.2000°E

Technopolis GS is a project to create a modern electronics industrial park in the Kaliningrad region of Russia.

== Project background ==
In 2007, in Gusev, for the first time in Russia, was established a production of set-top boxes for receiving satellite and terrestrial television broadcasts. Several months later, the General Satellite Corporation started building a plant in Gusev to manufacture household electronics products. The agreement between the mayor of Gusev, Nikolay Tsukanov, and the president of the General Satellite Corporation, Andrey Tkachenko, was signed in 2008, in order to create a modern industrial park in the city. The idea was approved by local authorities and was presented at the International Investment Forum "Sochi-2008".

The decision to locate the new production facilities in Gusev, according to Andrey Tkachenko, was made for two reasons. First, the experience of the first similar plant that had been working in Gusev as part of the special economic zone - the official residence of the Corporation - was successful. Second, the administration of the city took a great interest in cooperation for the creation of Technopolis and in a comprehensive solution to the problem of the territory development.

In 2009, two plants, JSC NPO Digital Television Systems (DTS) and Prankor, Ltd., were run - their products have no analogues in Russia. The plants produce set-top boxes for receiving the satellite and terrestrial TV broadcasts, and the production conveyor ensures a complete production cycle: starting with the motherboard and all the way up to the case and the satellite antennas as well. Formerly, most of these devices in the Russian market were imported, usually from China.

== Project mission ==
To create in Gusev a new effective pole for innovative development of Russia.

== Project objectives ==
- comprehensive economic development of Gusev, improving its social infrastructure, creating conditions for the development of innovative activity in the city and transformation of Gusev into a Technopolis toward 2013.
- establishing in Gusev a radio-electronics industry cluster. The Project envisages the construction of 5 high-tech industries, 2 of which are already running.
- testing an innovative model of small cities development in Russia, which can be applied to revive other towns in the country, according to the Project results.

== Investments ==
- Total investments in the Project (2008–2013): 5 billion rubles.
- Until the February 2010, invested: 1,5 billion rubles.

== Technopolis area ==
400 hectares. Over 3000 jobs.

== Project milestones ==
- 2009:

— Opening the Plant for the household radio-electronics products' manufacture;
— Commissioning the Plant for manufacturing metal and plastic products by stamping.

- 2010:

— Opening a Factory for the production of corrugated cardboard and packaging;
— Commissioning the House-Building Plant.

- 2011:

— Erection of the first stage of the cottage settlement in Gusev;
— Commissioning the social and business center of Technopolis.

- 2012:

— Inaugurating a microelectronics Factory (microprocessors assembly and casing);
— Construction of the second stage of the cottage settlement in Gusev;
— Integrated land improvement and social infrastructure construction;
— Opening a branch of SPSU, organization of educational and research process at the University's Education and Research Complex.

- 2013:

— Inaugurating a printed circuit board producing Plant;
— Setting on foot a Customs Warehouse.

== The anticipated outcomes of the Project ==
=== Development of new industries in Gusev ===
- Household radio-electronics manufacturing Plant
- Television antennas and case manufacturing Plant
- Corrugated cardboard and packaging producing Factory
- House-Building Plant
- Microelectronics Plant.

=== Creation of Educational and Scientific Research Center ===
- Design Bureau
- University Educational and Scientific Park (UESP)
- Venture Fund for supporting and implementing research and development accomplished both within Technopolis and outside of it
- Business Incubator – Industrial Park (BII).

=== Social and economics outcomes for the city and region ===
- increase the level and quality of life for the city and district residents;
- strengthening innovation and business activity in the Kaliningrad region;
- creating in Gusev a new Kaliningrad region growth pole.

=== National-scale results ===
- formation of a modern radio-electronics industry cluster that can be an engine of innovation development of the branch;
- testing an innovative model of development of small cities in Russia according to the example set by Gusev;
- formation of a complex enterprise that can provide for the mobile digitalization of Russian TV;
- creating an innovative growth pole and attracting Russian and foreign investments into domestic high-tech industry;
- formation of Russia's image as a technologically advanced country.

== Criticism of the Project ==
The market observers, in general, welcomed the General Satellite initiative and the investment prospects. "Industrial parks development, on one hand, is very expensive, and on the other – it is extremely knowledge-intensive”, - Pavel Zhavoronkov, an analyst at the investment firm Sovlink, said, while making a comment on the General Satellite Corporation plans. - “Based on the payroll size, 1500 to 2400 million rubles will be spent till the year 2011. The average payroll should be 1.95 billion, which will "swallow" almost 40% of the capital raised. The establishment of such an Industrial Park is possible only if stringent standards and practices are observed in the construction and cash flow. From the perspective of the country, it is an invaluable contribution to the development and science."

While implementing such projects, developers are often faced with many difficulties, of which the most serious are legislation "gaps" and official circumlocution. In this case, the local officials led by Georgi Boos – the Kaliningrad region Governor – proved to be a considerable support for the Project.
