= Eurobird =

Eurobird was a series of satellites owned and operated by Eutelsat. The Eurobird satellites provided broadcasting and telecommunication services primarily to the Western and Central European region from orbital positions of 9, 25.5 and 33 degrees East. The Eurobird brand was phased out on 1 March 2012, with the satellites becoming part of Eutelsat's main fleet in a company-wide rebranding.

Eurobirds still in operation:

- Eutelsat 33C (formerly Eurobird 1 and Eutelsat 28A), located at 33° East, carries no services at the moment.
- Eutelsat 25B / Es'hail (formerly Eurobird 2), located at 25.5° East, was formerly Hot Bird 5 at 13° East. It is more commonly referred to as Arabsat 2D, and carries mostly free-to-air television.
- Eutelsat 33A (formerly Eurobird 3), located at 33° East, mainly used for satellite internet access.
- Eutelsat 9A (formerly Eurobird 9A), located at 9° East, carries the German KabelKiosk package, the Russian Platform HD package, and American Forces Network Europe.

Eurobirds no longer in operation:

- Eutelsat 4A (formerly Eurobird 4A), located at 4° East since June 2009, retired in 2012.

Pending investigation of damage caused to the craft, the retired Hot Bird 3 will become Eurobird 10, positioned at 10E alongside Eutelsat W1.

== List of providers ==
Name	Location	Website
Eutelsat	France	www.eutelsat.com
Globecast	France	www.globecast.com
Wide Network Solutions	United Kingdom	www.widenetworks.net
Sky Italia	Italy	www.sky.it
Arqiva	United Kingdom	www.arqiva.com
