= Eutelsat I F-1 =

- Names: ECS-1; European Communications Satellite-1; Eutelsat 1
- Mission type: Communications
- Operator: ESA / Eutelsat
- COSPAR ID: 1983-058A
- SATCAT no.: 14128
- Website: https://www.eutelsat.com/en/home.html
- Mission duration: 7 years (planned); 13 years (achieved)

Spacecraft properties
- Spacecraft: ECS-1
- Spacecraft type: ECS
- Bus: ECS-Bus
- Manufacturer: British Aerospace
- Launch mass: 1,158 kg (2,553 lb)
- Dry mass: 500 kg (1,100 lb)
- Dimensions: 1.9 m x 1.4 m x 2.3 m Span on orbit: 13.8 m
- Power: 1 kW

Start of mission
- Launch date: 16 June 1983, 11:59:03 UTC
- Rocket: Ariane 1 (L06)
- Launch site: Centre Spatial Guyanais, ELA-1
- Contractor: Arianespace
- Entered service: 12 October 1983

End of mission
- Disposal: Graveyard orbit
- Deactivated: 16 December 1996

Orbital parameters
- Reference system: Geocentric orbit
- Regime: Geostationary orbit
- Longitude: 13° East (1983–1988); 16° East (1988–1991); 17.5° East (1991–1992); 25.5° East (1992–1993); 48° East (1993–1996); 36° East (1996)

Transponders
- Band: 12 Ku-band
- Bandwidth: 72 MHz
- Coverage area: Europe, the Middle East and Africa

Eutelsat I F-1, also known as European Communications Satellite 1 (ECS-1) is a decommissioned communications satellite operated by the European Telecommunications Satellite Organisation (Eutelsat). Launched in 1983, it was operated in geostationary orbit at a longitude of 13° East, before moving to several other locations later in its operational life, before it was finally decommissioned in 1996. It was the first of five satellites launched to form the first-generation Eutelsat constellation.

== History ==
The European Telecommunications Satellite Organization (Eutelsat) has been servicing the European Economic Community since 1977, being formally established by a multi-lateral agreement on 1 September 1985. In 1979, European Space Agency (ESA) agreed to design, build, and launch five ECS (European Communication Satellite) spacecraft to be assumed by Eutelsat after on-orbit testing.

The Eutelsat I series of satellites was developed by the European Space Agency (ESA) as part of the European Communications Satellite (ECS) programme. Once launched and checked out in a geostationary orbit over Europe, each satellite was handed to Eutelsat for commercial operations. Four Eutelsat I satellites were successfully launched between 1983-1988 (1983, 1984, 1987, and 1988). They served both public and private traffic, including telephone services, fax, data, land mobile service, and television and radio programming. Each had a design life of 7 years and a bandwidth of 72 MHz. ECS-3 was lost in an Ariane 3 launch accident in 1985.

== Satellite description ==
The Eutelsat I F-1 spacecraft, had a mass at launch of 1,158 kg (2,553 lb). Constructed by British Aerospace, it was designed to be operated for seven years and carried 12 Ku band transponders, two of which were set aside as spares. Unlike the later Eutelsat I satellites, F-1 did not have the two additional "SMS beam" transponders in the 12 GHz band. It also only had partial eclipse protection, requiring some channels to be turned off during eclipse periods around the spring and autumn equinoxes. The satellite contained a Mage-2 solid rocket motor to perform orbit circularisation at apogee.

== Launch ==
ECS-1 was launched by Arianespace, using an Ariane 1 launch vehicle, flight number L06. The launch took place at 11:59:03 UTC on 16 June 1983, from ELA-1 at Centre Spatial Guyanais, at Kourou, French Guiana. Successfully deployed into geostationary transfer orbit (GTO), ECS-1 raised itself into an operational geostationary orbit using its apogee motor.

== Mission ==
Following commissioning operations conducted by the European Space Agency (ESA) at a longitude of 10° East, the satellite was moved to its operational orbital position at 13° East, entering service on 12 October 1983. After five years in service, Eutelsat I F-1 was replaced by the newly launched Eutelsat I F-4. For the next three years it covered a new slot at 16° East until the launch of Eutelsat II F-3. After brief operations at 17.5° and 25.5° between 1991 and 1993, the satellite was moved to 48° East for most of its last three years of service. Between February and March 1996, the spacecraft was moved to 36° East, where it remained until November 1996. The satellite was decommissioned in December 1996; leaving geosynchronous orbit on 11 December 1996 before deactivation on 16 December 1996. It is in a graveyard orbit.
