= Amanda Redington =

British presenter and actress (born 1962)

Amanda Redington (born January 1962) is a British presenter and actress. She has been a presenter for TV channels such as Music Box and Sky Channel, during the mid and late 1980s, on GMTV in 1993 and on The Warehouse on Anglia TV.

Redington was a member of the music trio called K-Ram (their only hit was Menage à trois in 1984) and she took part in The Rap Pack. In 1988 she released a solo single entitled Fatal Attraction.

She married Dutch singer Frank Boeijen in 1990; they divorced in 1994. In March 1999 she married Glen Warriner, a businessman.

She has acted on the stage in Wife Begins at 40, playing Linda Harper; in Bedside Manners as Sally; in Snow White as the Wicked Queen; and in Jack and the Beanstalk as the fairy. Redington played the title role in Peter Pan at the Lewisham Theatre; she also played Jack in Jack and the Beanstalk; and she played Sandy in Grease at the Palace Theatre in Manchester.

Her film roles include Miss February in Sahara Sandwich (1991); Dorothy Rosenbaum in Flodders in America (1992); and Mandy in The Best Thing in Life (1993).
