= Platform HD =

Russian satellite TV company

LLC Platforma HD
- Company type: Limited liability company
- Industry: Telecommunications
- Founded: 2008
- Defunct: July 1, 2012
- Headquarters: Saint Petersburg, Russia
- Key people: Nikolai Gubbenet (Director General)
- Services: Satellite TV
- Website: platformahd.ru

Platforma HD (Russian: Платформа HD) was a Russian operator of satellite TV which broadcasts a package of HD-quality channels over the European territory of Russia. In addition, the package of channels of high-definition was available for retransmission in cable networks. On July 1, 2012, the service was shut down without giving any reason and has not been available since then.

== Channels ==
Platforma HD broadcasts the programs via satellite Eurobird 9A (9,0°E).

Main package (13 channels)

- 3DV
- Sport 1
- Eurosport HD
- HD Life
- HD Sport
- High Life
- MTVNHD
- National Geographic HD
- Women's world
- Nat Geo Wild
- Kinopokaz HD-1
- Kinopokaz HD-2
- Тeleputeshestviya HD

Platform DV (22 channels)

Terrestrial

- Bibigon
- Kultura
- Muz-TV
- NTV (Russia)
- Channel 5 (St. Petersburg)
- REN TV
- Russia 1
- Russia 2
- Russia 24
- TNT (Russia)
- STS
- RBC TV

Thematic

- 365 Days TV
- Zoo TV
- Auto Plus
- Kinopokaz
- Comedy TV
- Kitchen TV
- Teleputeshestvia
- Tonus TV
- Hunter & Fisherman
- 24 Techno

=== Other available channels ===
Besides channels from the packages of Platform HD and Platform DV, every subscriber can receive the un-encrypted TV and radio channels free of charge.

=== Recommended equipment ===
For viewing channels in HD quality the company recommends to use the following receiving equipment:
Satellite:

- General Satellite HD-9300.

Cable:

- General Satellite HD-9320.
- General Satellite HD-9322.

=== Subscribing ===
Subscribers can receive Platform HD signal directly from the satellite or through the cable network.

== Satellite coverage parameters ==
In the European part of Russia Platform HD was available via satellite on Eurobird 9А.

=== Orbital slot ===
9 degrees east longitude

=== Broadcast parameters ===
Platform HD

- Transponder #84

Frequency: 12,380 MHz
Polarization: Vertical (V)
Transmission standard: DVB-S2
Modulation: 8PSK
Symbol rate: 26,400
FEC: 2/3

- Transponder #80

Frequency: 12,303 MHz
Polarization: Vertical (V)
Transmission standard: DVB-S2
Modulation: 8PSK
Symbol rate: 26,400
FEC: 2/3

Platform DV

- Transponder #75

Frequency: 12,207 MHz
Polarization: Horizontal (H)
Transmission standard: DVB-S2
Modulation: 8PSK
Symbol rate: 27,500
FEC: 2/3

== 3D Television in Russia ==
In February 2010, Platform HD and its technological partners – General Satellite and Samsung Electronics – announced at the International professional exhibition CSTB 2010, they began working over the first 3D television project in Russia. However, the 3D channel is currently at a preparatory stage.
