= Gusev, Kaliningrad Oblast =

Town in Kaliningrad Oblast, Russia

Gusev Гусев
- Town
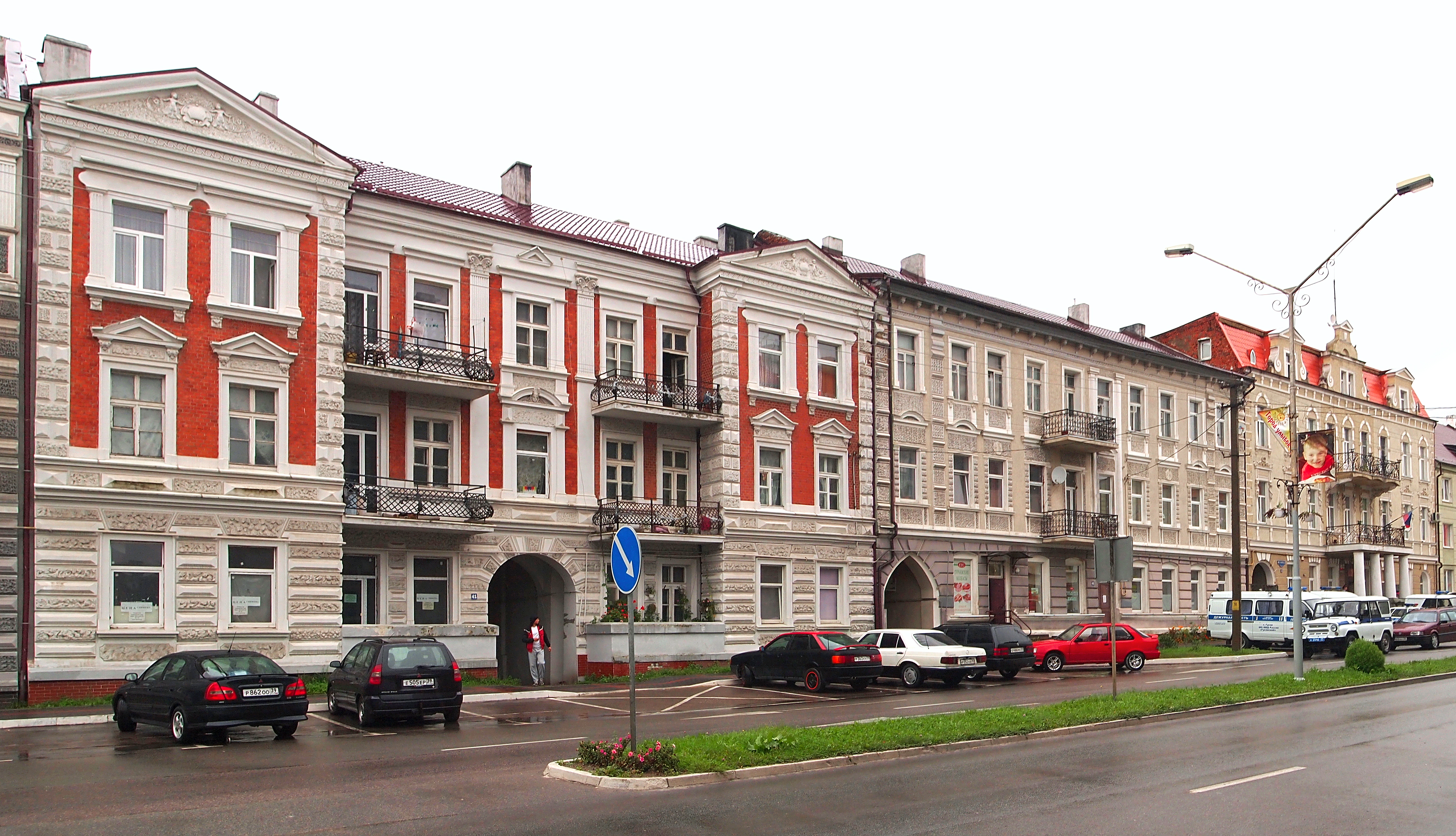
- Old tenement houses

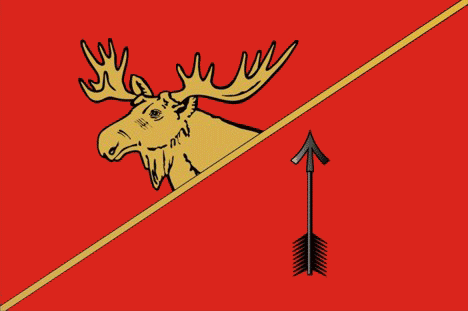
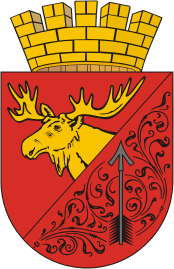
- Flag Coat of arms
- Interactive map of Gusev
- Location of Gusev Gusev (European Russia) Gusev (Russia)
- Coordinates: 54°35′N 22°12′E
- Country: Russia
- Federal subject: Kaliningrad Oblast
- Administrative district: Gusevsky District
- Town of district significanceSelsoviet: Gusev
- First mentioned: 1580
- Town status since: 1724
- Elevation: 45 m (148 ft)

Population (2010 Census)
  - Total: 28,260
  - Estimate (2023): 28,820 (+2%)

Administrative status
  - Capital of: Gusevsky District, town of district significance of Gusev

Municipal status
  - Urban okrug: Gusevsky Urban Okrug
  - Capital of: Gusevsky Urban Okrug
- Postal code: 238051
- Website: www.admgusev.ru

Gusev (Russian: Гу́сев; German: Gumbinnen; Lithuanian: Gumbinė; Polish: Gąbin) is a town and the administrative center of Gusevsky District of Kaliningrad Oblast, Russia, located at the confluence of the Pissa and Krasnaya Rivers, near the border with Poland and Lithuania, east of Chernyakhovsk. It is part of the historic region of Lithuania Minor. Population: 28,177 (2021 census); 28,260 (2010 census); 28,467 (2002 census); 27,031 (1989 Soviet census).

== History ==
The settlement of Gumbinnen (from Lithuanian: Gumbinė: pumpkin) in the Duchy of Prussia, a vassal duchy of the Kingdom of Poland, was first mentioned in a 1580 deed. A Protestant parish was established in Gumbinnen at the behest of the Hohenzollern thanks to Duke Albert of Prussia about 1545 and the first church was erected in 1582. It became part of Brandenburg-Prussia in 1618, remaining a fief of Poland.

=== 18th and 19th centuries ===
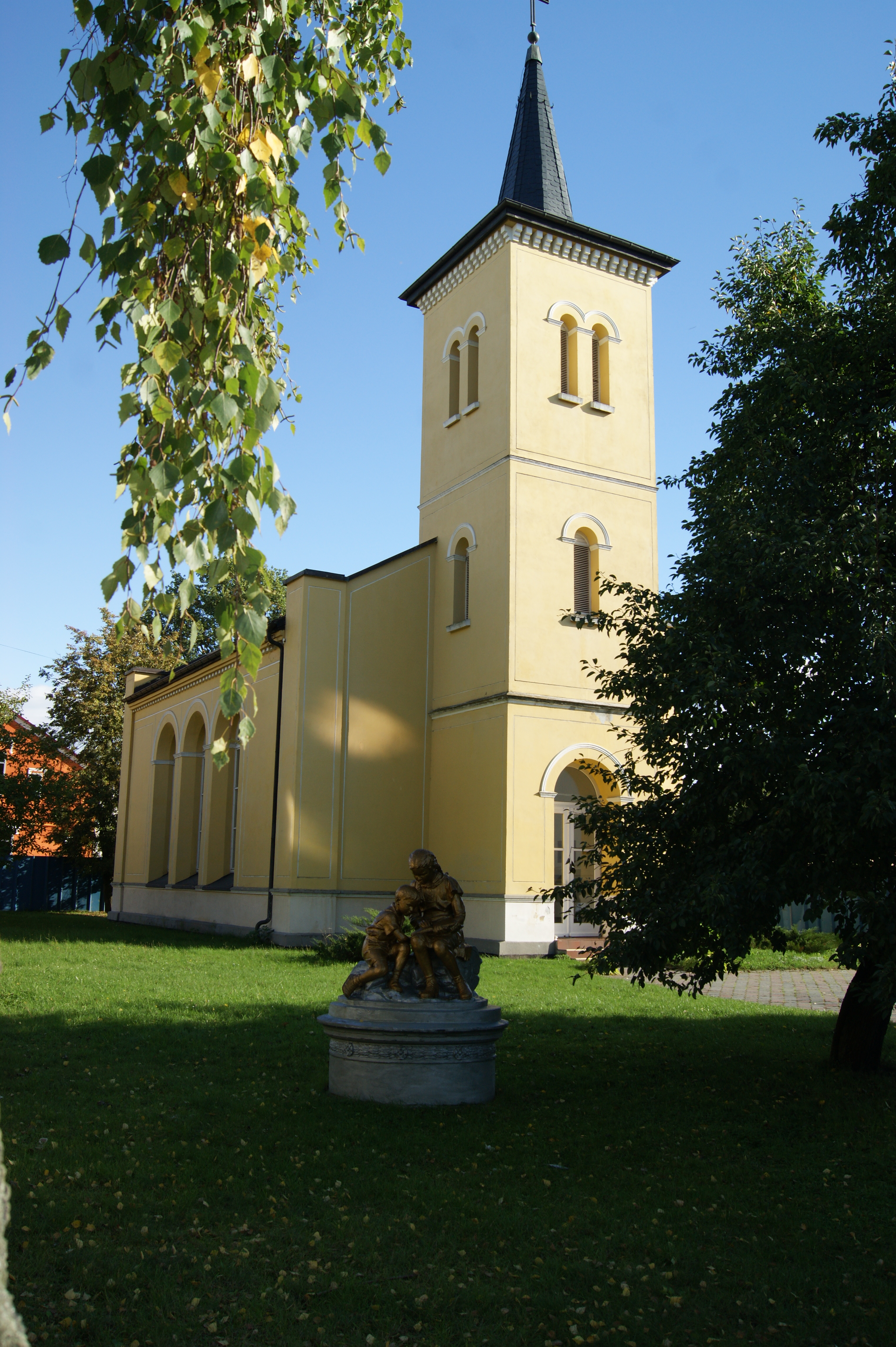
Salzburg Lutheran Church

From the 18th century, it was part of the Kingdom of Prussia. Between 1709 and 1711 the area was devastated by the Great Northern War plague outbreak and had to be redeveloped under the rule of the "Soldier King" Frederick William I of Prussia, who granted Gumbinnen town privileges in 1724 and from 1732 resettled the area with Salzburg Protestants, refugees from Salzburg, who had been expelled by Prince-Archbishop Count Leopold Anton von Firmian. From 1710, the French Reformed congregation was formed, whereas the German Reformed congregation was founded in 1739, and in 1808 the French congregation was incorporated into the German one. The first filial church of the Salzburg Protestants was erected in 1752, and was rebuilt in 1840 in a Neoclassical style according to plans designed by Karl Friedrich Schinkel. The church was restored in 1995 by the Evangelical Lutheran Church in Russia, Ukraine, Kazakhstan and Central Asia. In 1810, a public library was opened.

From 1815, Gumbinnen was the capital of Regierungsbezirk Gumbinnen, an administrative district of the Province of East Prussia, and became part of the German Empire upon the unification of Germany in 1871. In 1860 the Prussian State railway line from Königsberg to Stallupönen (now Nesterov) was built and the route passed through Gumbinnen, causing the town to grow in economic importance in the region. By the end of the 19th century, Gumbinnen had a foundry, a machine shop, a furniture factory, a clothing mill, two sawmills, several brickworks, and a dairy.

=== 20th century ===
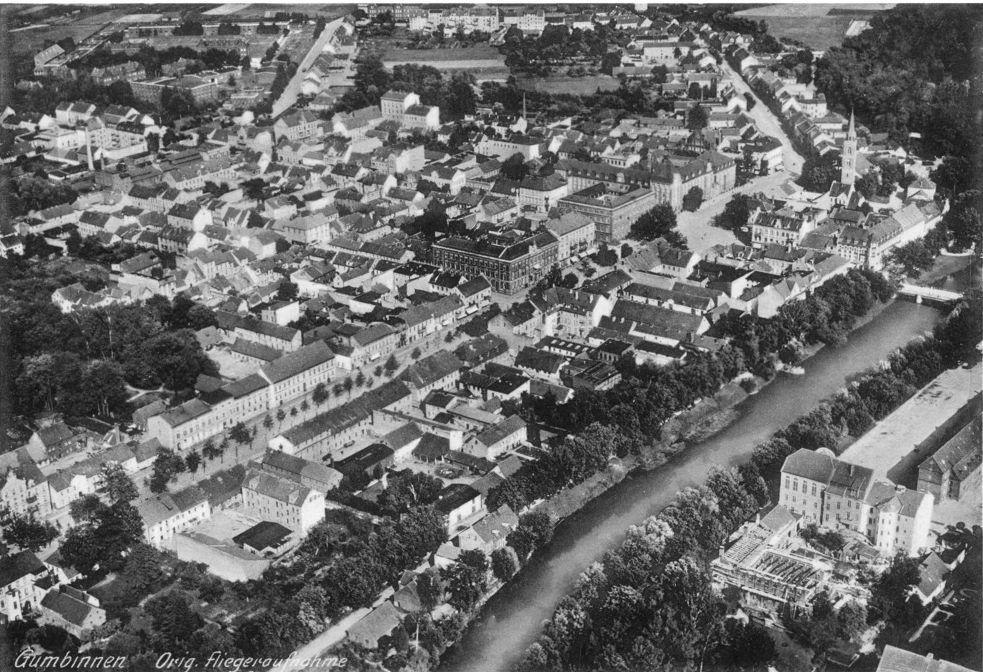
Aerial view in the early 20th century

During World War I the town was the site of the Battle of Gumbinnen, a major battle on the Eastern Front. The battle took place nearby in the opening days of the war in August 1914, and Gumbinnen was subsequently occupied by the Russian Army for several months. After the war, a power plant, the Ostpreußenwerk, was built in Gumbinnen and powered much of East Prussia. At the beginning of the Nazi era, Gumbinnen was designated a military sub-region of the Königsberg military area. Near the end of World War II, in 1944, the first of Gumbinnen's 24,000 residents began to flee from the advancing Red Army, and a Soviet air attack on 16 October 1944, caused heavy damage to the inner town area. On 22 October 1944, the town was taken by Soviet forces, who engaged in numerous vengeful atrocities against the civilian population before the Wehrmacht retook the town two days later. Although the German forces retook Gumbinnen and managed in late October to stabilize the battle line east of the town, it was quickly re-conquered by the Red Army during the great Soviet East Prussia offensive on 21 January 1945. During the Evacuation of East Prussia, the surviving German residents fled or were forcibly expelled.

Following the end of the war, under border changes promulgated at the Potsdam Conference in 1945, the northern part of the former province of East Prussia became a part of the Soviet Union, including Gumbinnen. The town was renamed Gusev, in honour of a Red Army captain, Sergei Ivanovich Gusev, who was killed in action near Gumbinnen in January 1945, and was posthumously given the award of Hero of the Soviet Union on 19 April 1945.

== Administrative and municipal status ==
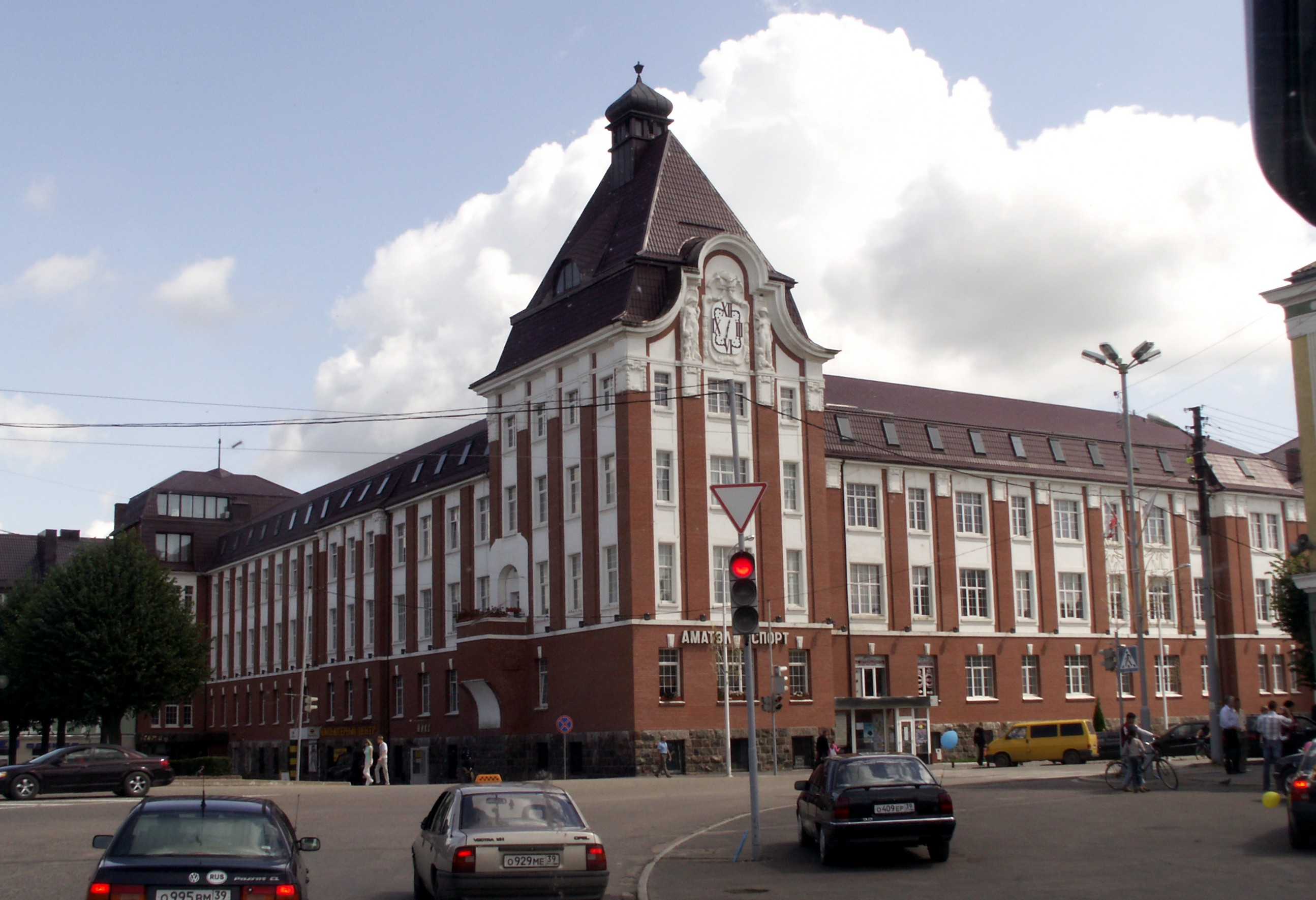
Administrative building

Within the framework of administrative divisions, Gusev serves as the administrative center of Gusevsky District. As an administrative division, it is incorporated within Gusevsky District as the town of district significance of Gusev.

Within the framework of municipal divisions, since 10 June 2013, the territories of the town of district significance of Gusev and of four rural okrugs of Gusevsky District are incorporated as Gusevsky Urban Okrug. Before that, the town of district significance was incorporated within Gusevsky Municipal District as Gusevskoye Urban Settlement.

== Economy ==
=== Transportation ===
Gusev lies on the double-track, broad-gauge rail line connecting the Kaliningrad Oblast exclave through Lithuania and Belarus with the main contiguous territory of Russia. The train line Yantar (Russian for "Amber") runs from Kaliningrad to Moscow and back again.

=== The Yantar Special Economic Zone ===
In the 1990s the Yantar Special Economic Zone was established in Kaliningrad Oblast. Some of projects in the zone are located in Gusev, such as NPO CTS.

== Notable people ==
- Kristijonas Donelaitis (1714–1780) a Prussian Lithuanian Lutheran pastor and poet
- Christian Daniel Rauch (1777–1857), German sculptor
- Otto von Corvin (1812–1886), German writer
- Gustav Albert Peter (1853–1937) a German botanist
- Richard Friese (1854–1918) German animal and landscape painter
- Konrad Grallert von Cebrów (1865–1942), divisional commander in the Austro-Hungarian Army
- Gotthard Heinrici (1886–1971), German general
- Bruno Bieler (1888–1966), German general
- Max Liedtke (1894-1955), German army officer, one of the Righteous Among the Nations
- Werner Dankwort (1895–1986), German diplomat
- Winfried Mahraun (1907–1973) German diver who competed in the 1936 Summer Olympics
- Wilhelm Schöning (1908–1987) Oberstleutnant, commander of the 66th Panzergrenadier Regiment
- Karin Krebs (born 1943), German athlete
- Oleg Gazmanov (born 1951), Russian pop-singer, composer and poet
- Nikolay Tsukanov (born 1965) a Russian politician, psychologist, businessman, electrical welder and former governor of Kaliningrad Oblast
- Vladimir Vdovichenkov (born 1971), Russian actor

== Twin towns and sister cities ==
Former twin towns:

Gusev had been twinned with:

- Kazlų Rūda, Lithuania
- Gołdap, Poland
- Pabianice, Poland

In March 2022, the Polish cities of Pabianice and Gołdap ended their partnership with Gusev as a response to the Russian invasion of Ukraine.
