= Eutelsat =

French-based satellite provider

Eutelsat Group

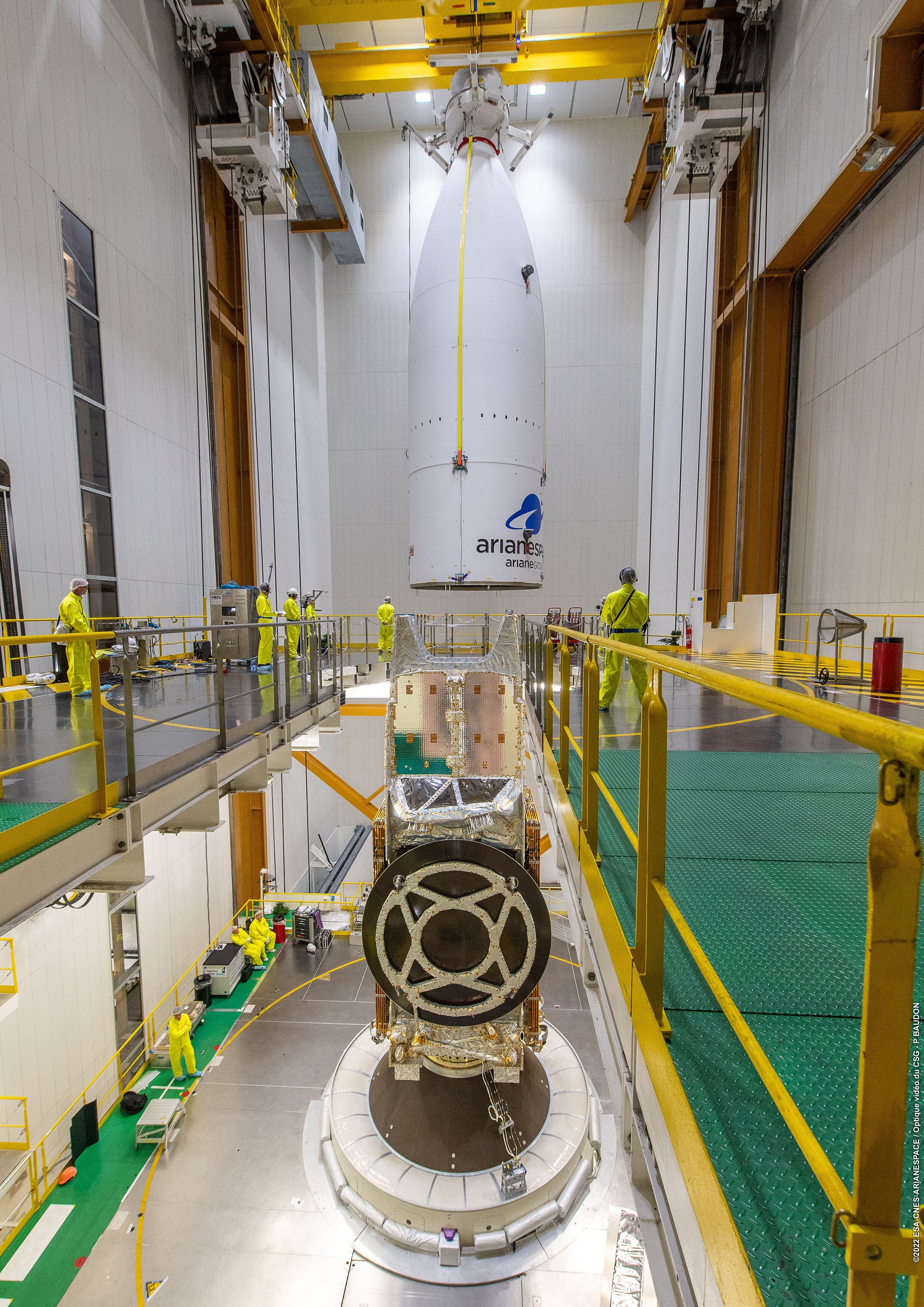
- The Eutelsat Konnect VHTS satellite being installed in Arianespace's Ariane 5 rocket prior to launch.
- Type: Société Anonyme
- Traded as: Euronext Paris: ETL; LSE: ETL; CAC Mid 60 Component
- Industry: Communications satellite
- Founded: 1977; 49 years ago
- Headquarters: Paris, France
- Key people: Jean-Francois Fallacher (CEO)
- Revenue: ▼€1.23 billion (2025/26)
- Operating income: ▲€-220 million (2025/26)
- Net income: ▲€-458 million (2025/26)
- Total assets: ▲€8.09 billion (2025/26)
- Total equity: ▲€3.68 billion (2025/26)
- Subsidiaries: Eutelsat OneWeb; Satmex; Skylogic; Fransat
- Website: www.eutelsat.com

Eutelsat Communications S.A., trading as Eutelsat Group (commonly referred to as Eutelsat) is a French satellite operator. Providing coverage over the entire European continent, the Middle East, Africa, Asia and the Americas, it has been the world's third-largest satellite operator in terms of revenues.

Eutelsat's satellites are used for broadcasting nearly 7,000 television stations, of which 1,400 are in high-definition television, and 1,100 radio stations to over 274 million cable and satellite homes. They also serve requirements for TV contribution services, corporate networks, mobile communications, Internet backbone connectivity and broadband access for terrestrial, maritime and in-flight applications. Eutelsat is headquartered in Paris, France. Eutelsat Communications' Chief Executive Officer is currently Jean-Francois Fallacher.

In October 2017, Eutelsat acquired Noorsat, one of the leading satellite service providers in the Middle East, from Bahrain's Orbit Holding Group. Noorsat is the premier distributor of Eutelsat capacity in the Middle East, serving blue-chip customers and providing services for over 300 TV channels almost exclusively from Eutelsat's market-leading the Middle East and North Africa neighbourhoods at 7/8° West and 25.5° East.

On 26 July 2022, Eutelsat announced a merger with LEO satellite internet operator OneWeb. When the merger was completed in September 2023, the company became a subsidiary of a new entity, "Eutelsat Group". It has 35 geostationary satellites alongside more than 600 satellites in it's OneWeb low Earth orbit constellation; the only active LEO constellation in the world, behind SpaceX's Starlink.

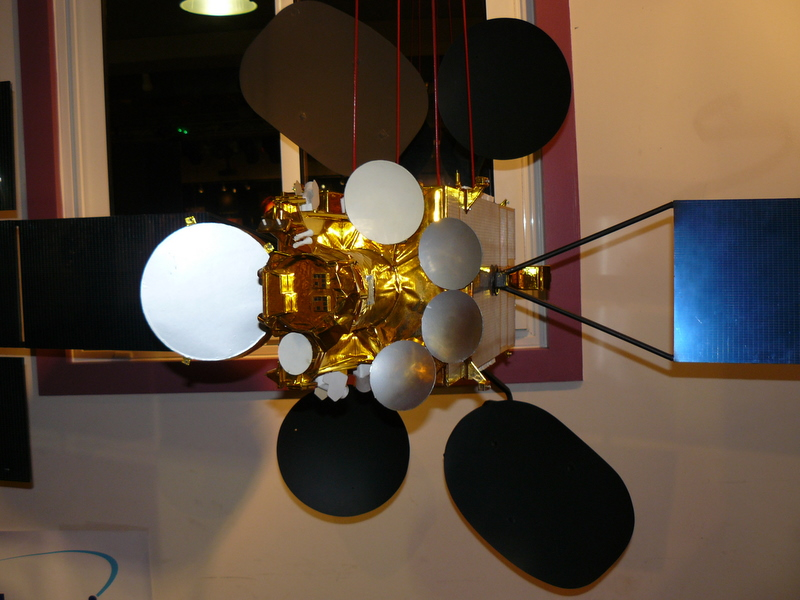
1/10 scale mockup of a Eutelsat W3 satellite, a Spacebus 4000C3

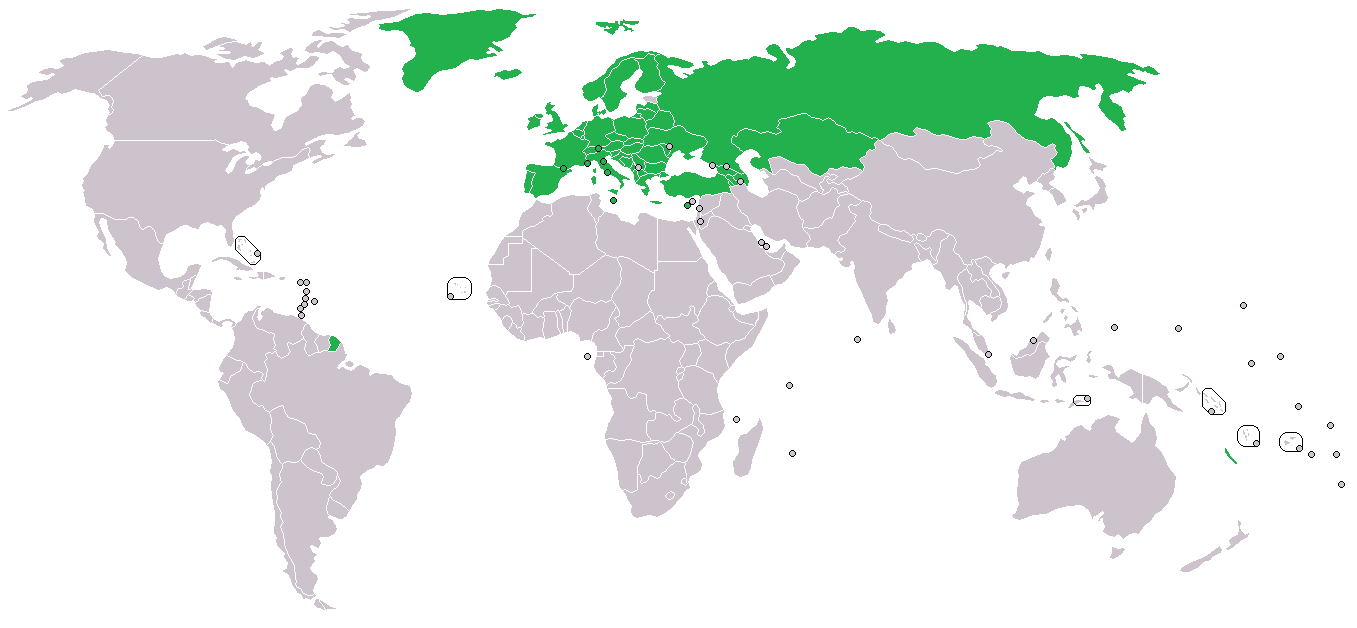
European Telecommunications Satellite Organization membership

== History ==
The European Telecommunications Satellite Organization (Eutelsat) was originally set up in 1977 (49 years ago), by 17 European countries as an intergovernmental organisation (IGO). Its role was to develop and operate a satellite-based telecommunications infrastructure for Europe. The Convention establishing the European Telecommunications Satellite Organization Eutelsat was opened for signature in July 1982 and entered into force on 1 September 1985.

In 1982, Eutelsat decided to start operations of its first TV channel (Satellite Television) on the Orbital Test Satellite (OTS) in cooperation with European Space Agency (ESA). This was the first satellite-based direct-to-home TV channel launched in Europe. In 1983, Eutelsat launched its first satellite to be used for telecommunications and TV distribution

Initially established to address satellite telecommunications demand in Western Europe, Eutelsat rapidly developed its infrastructure to expand coverage to additional services (i.e. TV) and markets, such as Central and Eastern Europe in 1989, and the Middle East, the African continent, and large parts of Asia and the Americas from the 1990s.

Eutelsat was the first satellite operator in Europe to broadcast television channels direct-to-home. It developed its premium neighbourhood of five Hot Bird satellites in the mid-1990s to offer capacity that would be able to attract hundreds of channels to the same orbital location, appealing to wider audiences for consumer satellite TV.

With the general liberalisation of the telecommunications sector in Europe, Eutelsat's assets, liabilities and operational activities were transferred to a private company called Eutelsat S.A. established for this purpose in July 2001. The structure role and activities of the new intergovernmental organisation Eutelsat IGO evolved. According to Eutelsat IGO's amended constitution in 2016, the main purpose of Eutelsat IGO has been to ensure that Eutelsat S.A. observes the Basic Principles set forth in the Eutelsat Amended Convention entered into force in November 2002. These Basic Principles refer to public service/universal service obligations, pan European coverage by the satellite system, non-discrimination and fair competition. The Executive Secretary of Eutelsat IGO participates in all meetings of the Board of Directors of Eutelsat Communications S.A. and Eutelsat S.A. as an observer to the Board (censeur).

In April 2005, the principal shareholders of Eutelsat S.A. grouped their investment in a new entity (Eutelsat Communications), which is now the holding company of the Group owning 95.2% of Eutelsat S.A. on 6 October 2005. As of 2009, the holding company owned 96.0% of Eutelsat S.A.

=== 2010s ===
On 31 July 2013, Eutelsat Communications announced the 100% acquisition of Satélites Mexicanos, S.A. de C.V. ("Satmex") for US$831 million in cash plus the assumption of US$311 million in Satmex debt, pending government and regulatory approvals. The transaction was finalized on 2 January 2014. Based in Mexico, Satmex operates three satellites at contiguous positions, 113° West (Satmex 6), 114.9° West (Satmex 5) and 116.8° West (Satmex 8) that cover 90% of the population of the Americas.

In December 2015, the company announced a partnership with Facebook to launch an internet satellite over Africa by 2016 where Facebook lease all of a satellite's high throughput Ka-band capacity, however, the satellite was destroyed during launch preparations.

=== 2020s ===
In December 2020, Eutelsat launched Eutelsat Konnect, a domestic broadband service targeting remote localities, in the United Kingdom with a planned subsequent launch across Europe.

In July 2021, Eutelsat launched Eutelsat Quantum, the first full software-defined satellite. It will enable users, notably in the Government and Mobility markets, to actively define and shape performance and reach thanks to its software-based design.

In December 2021, Eva Berneke was appointed Chief Executive Officer to replace Rodolphe Belmer. She will take up her position on 1 January 2022.

In March 2022, in the context of the 2022 Russian invasion of Ukraine and growing censorship in Russia, two of the Russian packagers active on the 36°E Eutelsat satellites, NTV Plus (a subsidiary of Gazprom Media) and Trikolor, unilaterally interrupted broadcasting of 8 international news channels (BBC World, CNN, Deutsche Welle, Euronews, France 24, NHK World, RAInews 24, TV5 Monde). This interruption was denounced by the Denis Diderot Committee, made up of academics and professionals from the European audiovisual sector, which published a report and launched a petition asking for sanctions from the European Union and Eutelsat IGO against the two operators. The petition is signed by all members of the Ukrainian regulatory body, the National Radio and Television Council.

== Distribution of Russian TV and radio channels sanctioned by the European Union ==
Eutelsat continues to collaborate with Russian TV platforms such as NTV-Plus and Tricolor. In France, the association Denis Diderot Committee has started a petition to put pressure on the EU to get Eutelsat to drop cooperation with the Russian channels due to a war in Ukraine. In a press release, the association writes that it is 'paradoxical and unforgivable' that European satellites are used to broadcast Russian channels, which 'only spread the Kremlin's official state propaganda.

As top manager of French Eutelsat, Danish Eva Berneke defended the strategy in a podcast interview with Techmediet Radar: "It is clear that then we would have to wave goodbye to some Russian customers, who would then move on to some Russian satellites or something else". Media spokesman Kasper Sand Kjær of the Danish Social Democrats comments this decision with: "I think everyone should decide for themselves which side you want to stand on in the story. I do not believe that one can get through the time we are in right now by saying that one is neutral".

Jim Phillipoff, co-founder of the Denis Diderot Committee explained further that Eutelsat's declared "neutrality" is rather dubious granted the fact that Eutelsat only offers channels on 36°E to Russian customers but not independent Russian-language broadcasts, which could help break information monopoly of the Russian state. As described above, Russian customers already actively censored western channels in their broadcasts on 36°E, which made the claims of Eutelsat's neutrality even more absurd.

On 14 December 2022, the French media regulatory authority Arcom formally ordered Eutelsat to cease broadcasting three Russian channels, Rossiya 1, Perviy Kanal, and NTV, whose programs devoted to the Russian invasion of Ukraine contain repeated incitement to hatred and violence and numerous breaches of fair reporting. This decision followed a ruling by the interim relief judge of the Council of State dated 9 December 2022, who asked the Authority to reexamine the situation of these three channels in light of additional evidence presented during the investigation. It emerged that they were broadcast not only in Russia, but also in the Ukrainian territories annexed by Russia. Since, unlike Russia, Ukraine has signed and ratified the European Convention on Transfrontier Television, as has France, Arcom therefore has a legal basis to require Eutelsat to cease broadcasting these channels.

On 16 December 2022, the European Union adopted sanctions against the Russian TV channels Perviy Kanal, Rossiya 1, NTV and REN-TV, as well as sanctions against the Russian media companies VGTRK, National Media Group and the Russian Armed Forces. Eutelsat said on 22 December that it stood to lose up to 15 million euros ($16 million) in annual revenues from restricting broadcasts in Russia and Iran to comply with sanctions.

On 5 March 2024, RSF has launched the Svoboda Satellite package on the Eutelsat Hotbird 13G. The package proposes 8 TV channels and 3 radio channels provided by Russian media in exile in Western Europe, RFE, Deutsche Welle, the Moldovan TV8 and the Ukrainian Gordon Live.

Eutelsat has implemented the French and EU sanctions against Russian channels, but has not implemented the sanctions against Russian media groups adopted by the European Union since 16 December 2022 (VGTRK, National Media Group, and in later Zvezda the broadcasting company of the Russian Army, and SPAS Telekanal, the broadcasting company of the Russian Orthodox Church. Answering to shareholders' questions during the General Assembly of 21 November 2024, the company argued that it cannot decide to exclude channels without clear instructions of the French media regulatory authority Arcom.

On 2 March 2025, the Diderot Committee and three associations (Union des Ukrainiens de France, Russie-Libertés, Pour l'Ukraine, leur liberté et la nôtre) contacted the French Ombudsman to alert on the fact that the French media regulatory authority Arcom lacks of diligence in ordering the company to respect the EU sanctions against Russian media companies. According to the Diderot Committee, as at early March 2025, 192 frequencies on Eutelsat satellites are still occupied by TV and radio channels provided by Russian sanctioned companies, including channels of the Russian Army and of the Orthodox Church and distributed in Russia in the illegally annexed territories of Ukraine.

== Services ==
In June 2021, Eutelsat launched Eutelsat Advance, an end-to-end managed connectivity service, including network interconnection, a management portal and APIs for service providers and their clients. Available via Eutelsat's certified network of partners, Eutelsat Advance enables service providers in Enterprise, Maritime, Aviation, Government and Telecoms to enhance their service portfolio by increasing the range of connectivity services they offer.

In September 2018, Eutelsat announced Cirrus, which enabled broadcasters to deliver content to satellite and over-the-top media service. Viewers can watch content on screens, phones and tablets, access multiple programmes, record and rewind and view detailed programme information.

With a global fleet of satellites and associated ground infrastructure, Eutelsat enables clients across Video, Data, Government, Fixed and Mobile Broadband markets to communicate effectively to their customers, irrespective of their location. Over 6800 television channels operated by leading media groups are broadcast by Eutelsat to one billion viewers across the world equipped for DTH reception or connected to terrestrial networks

As of March 2025, the company stated that it offers the same capacities as Starlink in Europe. However the operation of Eutelsat terminals is many times more expensive than that of Starlink.

== Satellites ==
Eutelsat sells capacity on 36 satellites located in geosynchronous orbit between 139° West and 174° East. On 1 March 2012, Eutelsat changed the names of its satellites. The group's satellites mostly take the Eutelsat name, with the relevant figure for their orbital position and a letter indicating their order of arrival at that position. On 21 May 2014, Eutelsat Americas (formerly Satmex) aligned its satellite names with the Eutelsat brand.

Satellite	COSPAR ID	Location	Launch Vehicle	Regions served	Launch	Comments
Eutelsat Konnect VHTS	2022-110A	2.7°E	Ariane 5 ECA	Europe	7 September 2022	Very High Throughput Satellite. Hosting the most powerful on-board digital processor ever put in orbit.
Eutelsat 3B	2014-030A	3°E	Zenit-3SL	Europe, Africa, the Middle East, Central Asia, Brazil	26 May 2014	Entered service in July 2014
Eutelsat 5 West B	2019-067A	5°W	Proton-M/Briz-M	Europe, North Africa	9 October 2019	
Eutelsat 7B (Eutelsat W3D/Eutelsat 3D)	2013-022A	7°E	Proton-M/Briz-M	Europe, Middle East, Africa	14 May 2013	
Eutelsat 7C	2019-034B	7°E	Ariane 5 ECA	Europe, Middle East, Africa	20 June 2019	
Eutelsat Konnect	2020-005B	7°E	Ariane 5 ECA	Europe, Africa	17 January 2020	First satellite to use Thales Alenia Space's all-electric Spacebus NEO platform
Eutelsat 7 West A (Atlantic Bird 7/Nilesat-104)	2011-051A	7.3°W	Zenit-3SL	Middle East, North Africa	24 September 2011	Formerly named Atlantic Bird 7 until March 2012
Eutelsat 8 West B (Nilesat-104B)	2015-039A	8°W	Ariane 5 ECA	Africa, Middle East	20 August 2015	
Eutelsat KA-SAT 9A	2010-069A	9°E	Proton-M/Briz-M	Europe	26 December 2010	
Eutelsat 9B (EDRS A)	2016-005A	9°E	Proton-M/Briz-M	Europe, North Africa, Middle East	30 January 2016	
Eutelsat 10A (Eutelsat W2A)	2009-016A	10°E	Proton-M/Briz-M	Europe, Africa, Middle East	3 April 2009	Formerly named Eutelsat W2A until March 2012; S-band payload not yet entered into service due to an anomaly. Solaris Mobile filed the insurance claim and should be able to offer some, but not all of the services it was planning to offer.
Eutelsat 10B	2022-157A	10°E	Falcon 9 Block 5	North Atlantic corridor, Europe, Mediterranean basin, Middle East	23 November 2022	
Hot Bird 13B (Hot Bird 8)	2006-032A	13°E	Proton-M/Briz-M	Europe, North Africa, Middle East	5 August 2006	Formerly named Hot Bird 8 until March 2012
Hot Bird 13C (Hot Bird 9)	2008-065D	13°E	Ariane 5 ECA	Europe, North Africa, Middle East	20 December 2008	Formerly named Hot Bird 9 until March 2012
Hot Bird 13E (Hot Bird 7A/Eurobird 9A/Eutelsat 9A)	2006-007B	13°E	Ariane 5 ECA	Europe, North Africa, Middle East	11 March 2006	Formerly named Eurobird 9A until March 2012; former Hot Bird 7A satellite / Eutelsat 9A
Hotbird 13F	2022-134A	13°E	Falcon 9 Block 5	Europe, North Africa, Middle East	15 October 2022	All-electric Eurostar Neo bus
Hotbird 13G	2022-146A	13°E	Falcon 9 Block 5	Europe, North Africa, Middle East	3 November 2022	All-electric Eurostar Neo bus
Eutelsat 16A (Eutelsat W3C)	2011-057A	16°E	Long March 3B	Europe, Sub-Saharan Africa, Indian Ocean Islands	7 October 2011	Formerly named Eutelsat W3C until March 2012
Eutelsat 21B (Eutelsat W6A)	2012-062B	21.5°E	Ariane 5 ECA	Europe, Middle East, North Africa, West Africa, Central Asia	10 November 2012	Fully operational since 19 December 2012.
Eutelsat 33C (Eurobird 1/Eutelsat 133 West A/Eutelsat 28A)	2001-011A	33°E	Ariane 5G	Europe	8 March 2001	Satellite is currently being redeployed at 33° East where it will be co-located with Eutelsat 33B. Formerly named Eurobird 1 until March 2012 and Eutelsat 28A until July 2015
Eutelsat 33E (Hot Bird 10/Atlantic Bird 4A/Hot Bird 13D/Eutelsat 3C)	2009-008B	33°E	Ariane 5 ECA	Europe, South-West Asia	12 February 2009	Formerly Hot Bird 10 and Atlantic Bird 4A
Eutelsat 36A (Eutelsat W4/Eutelsat 70C)	2000-028A	36°E	Atlas IIIA	Africa, Russia	24 May 2000	Formerly named Eutelsat W4 until March 2012.
Eutelsat 36B (Eutelsat W7)	2009-065A	36°E	Proton-M/Briz-M	Europe, Africa, Middle East, Russia	24 November 2009	Formerly named Eutelsat W7 until March 2012
Eutelsat 36C (Ekspress AMU1)	2015-082A	36°E	Proton-M/Briz-M	Russia, Africa	2015	
Eutelsat 36D	2024-059A	36°E	Falcon 9 Block 5	Europe, Africa, Russia	30 March 2024	Replacement for Eutelsat 36B
Eutelsat 36 West A (Atlantic Bird 1/Eutelsat 12 West A/Eutelsat 59A)	2002-040A	36.5°W	Ariane 5G	Europe, Middle East, Americas	28 August 2002	Formerly named Atlantic Bird 1 until March 2012, and Eutelsat 12 West A
Eutelsat 48D (Afghansat 1/Eutelsat W2M/Eutelsat 48B/Eutelsat 38B)	2008-065B	48°E	Ariane 5 ECA	Afghanistan, Central Asia	20 December 2008	Co-branded Afghansat 1. Formerly named Eutelsat 28B until January 2014, Eutelsat 48B until August 2012, W2M until March 2012.
Eutelsat Quantum	2021-069B	48°E	Ariane 5 ECA+	Middle East, North Africa	30 July 2021	First in-orbit reprogrammable satellite
Eutelsat 65 West A	2016-014A	65°W	Ariane 5 ECA	Americas	9 March 2016	
Eutelsat 70B (Eutelsat W5A)	2012-069A	70.5°E	Zenit-3SL	Europe, Middle East, Africa, Central Asia, South East Asia, Australia	3 December 2012	
Eutelsat 113 West A (Satmex 6)	2006-020A	113°W	Ariane 5 ECA	Americas	27 May 2006	Formerly Satmex 6 until May 2014
Eutelsat 115 West B (Satmex 7)	2015-010B	114.9°W	Falcon 9 v1.1	Americas	2 March 2015	
Eutelsat 117 West A (Satmex 8)	2013-012A	116.8°W	Proton-M/Briz-M	Americas	26 March 2013	Formerly Satmex 8 until May 2014
Eutelsat 117 West B (Satmex 9)	2016-038B	116.8°W	Falcon 9 FT	Americas	15 June 2016	Formerly Satmex 9
Eutelsat 139 West A (Eutelsat W3A/Eutelsat 7A)	2004-008A	139°W	Proton-M/Briz-M	Americas	16 March 2004	Formerly named Eutelsat W3A until March 2012, then Eutelsat 7A
Eutelsat 172B	2017-027A	172°E	Ariane 5 ECA	Asia-Pacific	1 June 2017	
Eutelsat 174A (Eutelsat 172A/AMC 23/GE-23)	2005-052A	174°E	Proton-M/Briz-M	Asia-Pacific	29 December 2005	Formerly Eutelsat 172A, and GE-23 satellite

=== Rented capacity ===
Satellite	Location	Launch Vehicle	Regions served	Launch
Eutelsat 28E (Astra 2E)	28.2°E	Proton-M/Briz-M	Europe	29 September 2013
Eutelsat 28F (Astra 2F)	28.2°E	Ariane 5 ECA	Europe	28 September 2012
Eutelsat 28G (Astra 2G)	28.2°E	Proton-M/Briz-M	Europe	27 December 2014
Eutelsat 53A (Ekspress AM 6)	56°E	Proton-M/Briz-M	Europe, Asia	21 October 2014
Ekspress-AT1	56°E	Proton-M/Briz-M	Europe, Asia	16 March 2014
Ekspress-AT2	140°E	Proton-M/Briz-M	Europe, Asia	16 March 2014
SESAT 2	15°W	Proton-M/Briz-M	Europe, Americas	19 October 1999

=== Former satellites ===
Satellite	COSPAR ID	Location	Launch Vehicle	Launched	Inclined	Retired	Lost	Comments
Eutelsat I F-1 (ECS 1)	1983-058A	13°E	Ariane 1	1983	1989	1996	—N/a	
Eutelsat I F-2 (ECS 2)	1984-081A	7°E	Ariane 3	1984	1990	1993	—N/a	
Eutelsat I F-4 (ECS 4)	1987-078B	7/13°E	Ariane 3	1987	1993	2002	—N/a	
Eutelsat I F-5 (ECS 5)	1988-063B	10°E	Ariane 3	1988	1994	2000	—N/a	
Eutelsat 2 F-1	1990-079B	13°E	Ariane 44LP H10	1990	1999	2003	—N/a	
Eutelsat 2 F-2	1991-003B	10°E	Ariane 44LP H10	1991	2000	2005	—N/a	
Eutelsat 2 F-3	1991-083A	16°E	Atlas II	1991	2000	2004	—N/a	
Eutelsat 2 F-4	1992-041B	7°E	Ariane 44L H10	1992	2001	2003	—N/a	
Hot Bird 1 (Eutelsat 2 F-6)	1995-016B	13°E	Ariane 44LP H10+	1995	2006	2007	2012	
Hot Bird 6 (Hot Bird 13A/Eutelsat 8 West C/Eutelsat 33D/Eutelsat 70D)	1995-016B	—N/a	Atlas V 401	2002	—N/a	2016	—N/a	
Eutelsat 21A (Eutelsat W6/Eutelsat W3/Eutelsat 48C)	1995-016B	—N/a	Atlas IIAS	1999	—N/a	—N/a	—N/a	
Eutelsat 8 West D (Sinosat-3/Chinasat-5C/Eutelsat 3A)		—N/a	Long March 3A	2007	—N/a	—N/a	—N/a	
Eutelsat 59A (Atlantic Bird 1/Eutelsat 12 West A/Eutelsat 36 West A)	2002-040A	—N/a	Ariane 5G	2002	—N/a	2018	—N/a	
Eutelsat W2	1998-056A	16°E	Ariane 44L H10-3	1998	—N/a	2010	—N/a	
Eutelsat W3B	2010-056A	16°E	Ariane 5 ECA	2010	—N/a	2010	—N/a	
Eutelsat W75 (Eurobird 10/Eurobird 4/Hot Bird 3/ABS 1B)	1997-049A	4°E	Ariane 44LP H10-3	1997	—N/a	2011	—N/a	Former Hot Bird 3 and Eurobird 4 satellite
Eutelsat 4A (Eurobird 4A/Eutelsat W1)	2000-052A	4°E	Ariane 44LP H10-3	2000	—N/a	2012	—N/a	Former Eutelsat W1 satellite
Eutelsat 4B (Hot Bird 5/Eurobird 2/Arabsat 2D/Badr-2/Eutelsat 25A)	1998-057A	4°E	Atlas IIA	1998		2014	—N/a	Formerly named Eurobird 2 until March 2012, now at 4E and called Eutelsat 4B
Eutelsat 5 West A (Atlantic Bird 3)	2002-035A	5°W	Ariane 5G	5 July 2002		January 2023	—N/a	Formerly named Atlantic Bird 3 until March 2012, was also called Stellat 5
Eutelsat 16B (Hot Bird 4/Nilesat-103/Atlantic Bird 4/Eurobird 16)	1998-013A	16°E	Ariane 42P H10-3	1998		2015	—N/a	Formerly named Eurobird 16 until March 2012; former Atlantic Bird 4 and Hot Bird 4 satellite
Eutelsat 16C (SESAT 1)	2000-019A	16°E	Proton-K/Blok DM-2M	2000		2018	—N/a	Formerly named SESAT 1 until March 2012. Operated in inclined orbit at 16° East
Eutelsat 12 West B (Atlantic Bird 2/Eutelsat 8 West A)	2001-042A	12.5°W	Ariane 44P H10-3	2001		2020		Formerly named Atlantic Bird 2 until March 2012 and Eutelsat 8 West A until October 2015, when it was redeployed to 12.5° West
Eutelsat 31A (eBird 1/Eutelsat 33A/Eurobird 3)	2003-043A	31°E	Ariane 5G	2003		2018	—N/a	Formerly named Eurobird and Eutelsat 33A
Eutelsat 33B (Eutelsat W5/Eutelsat 70A/Eutelsat 25C)	2002-051A	33°E	Delta IV Medium+(4,2)	2002		2015	—N/a	Formerly named Eutelsat W5 until March 2012; lost one of two solar panels 16 June 2008. Now at 25° East and called Eutelsat 25C.
Eutelsat 115 West A (Satmex 5)	1998-070A	114.8°W	Ariane 42L H10-3	1998		2015	—N/a	Formerly Satmex 5 until May 2014
Eutelsat 48A (Eurobird 9/Eutelsat W48/Hot Bird 2)	1996-067A	48°E	Atlas IIA	21 November 1996		2017	—N/a	Formerly named Eutelsat W48 until March 2012; former Hot Bird 2 and Eurobird 9 satellite; operating in inclined orbit.
Eutelsat 25B (Es'hail 1)	2013-044A	25.5°E	Ariane 5 ECA	29 August 1998				Eutelsat's share in the satellite sold to Es'hailSat in 2018.

=== Failures of Eutelsat satellites ===
Satellite	COSPAR ID	Location	Launch Vehicle	Launched	Inclined	Retired	Lost	Comments
Eutelsat I F-3 (ECS 3)		—N/a	Ariane 3	1985	—N/a	—N/a	—N/a	Launch Failure
Eutelsat 2 F-5		—N/a	Ariane 44LP H10+	1994	—N/a	—N/a	—N/a	Launch Failure
Hot Bird 7		—N/a	Ariane 5 ECA	2002	—N/a	—N/a	—N/a	Launch Failure

=== Future satellites ===
Satellite	COSPAR ID	Location	Launch Vehicle	Launched	Inclined	Retired	Lost	Comments
Flexsat		TBA	TBA	2026	—N/a	—N/a	—N/a	

== Organization ==
=== Shareholders ===
Major Shareholders	Equity %
Government of France	29.65
Bharti Enterprises	17.88
Government of the United Kingdom	10.89
CMA CGM	7.46
SB Investment Advisers (UK)	7.27
Fonds stratégique de participations	4.99
Free float	21.86

== Bibliography ==
- (in French and English) Guy Lebègue, (trad. Robert J. Amral), «Eutelsat II: OK For West-to-East Service!», in Revue aerospatiale, n° 73, November 1990
