= Ariane 3 =

European medium-lift space launch vehicle (1984–1989)

- Function: Medium-lift launch vehicle
- Manufacturer: Aérospatiale for European Space Agency (ESA) and Arianespace

Size
- Height: 49.13 m (161.2 ft)
- Diameter: 3.8 m (12 ft)
- Mass: 234,000 kg (516,000 lb)
- Stages: 3

Capacity

Payload to GTO (200 km x 36,000 km at i=7 deg)
- Mass: 2,700 kg (6,000 lb)

Associated rockets
- Family: Ariane
- Based on: Ariane 1
- Derivative work: Ariane 4

Launch history
- Status: Retired
- Launch sites: Guiana, ELA-1
- Total launches: 11
- Success(es): 10
- Failure: 1
- First flight: 4 August 1984
- Last flight: 12 July 1989

Boosters – SPB 7.35
- No. boosters: 2
- Height: 8.32 m (27 ft 4 in)
- Diameter: 1.07 m (3 ft 6 in)
- Empty mass: 2,313 kg (5,099 lb)
- Gross mass: 9,663 kg (21,303 lb)
- Maximum thrust: 690 kN (160,000 lb_{f}) each
- Total thrust: 1,380 kN (310,000 lb_{f})
- Specific impulse: 263 s (2.58 km/s)
- Burn time: 29 seconds
- Propellant: CTPB

First stage – L-140B
- Height: 18.4 m (60 ft)
- Diameter: 3.8 m (12 ft)
- Empty mass: 13,750 kg (30,310 lb)
- Gross mass: 160,030 kg (352,810 lb)
- Powered by: 4 × Viking 2B
- Maximum thrust: 2,580 kN (580,000 lb_{f})
- Specific impulse: 281 s (2.76 km/s)
- Burn time: 140 seconds
- Propellant: N_{2}O_{4} / UH 25

Second stage – L-33B
- Height: 11.5 m (37 ft 9 in)
- Diameter: 2.6 m (8 ft 6 in)
- Empty mass: 3,625
- Gross mass: 37,130 kg (81,860 lb)
- Powered by: 1 × Viking 4B
- Maximum thrust: 805 kN (181,000 lb_{f})
- Specific impulse: 296 s (2.90 km/s)
- Burn time: 125 seconds
- Propellant: N_{2}O_{4} / UH 25

Third stage – H-10
- Height: 11.53 m (37 ft 10 in)
- Diameter: 2.66 m (8 ft 9 in)
- Empty mass: 1,600 kg (3,500 lb)
- Gross mass: 12,000 kg (26,000 lb)
- Powered by: 1 × HM7B
- Maximum thrust: 62.7 kN (14,100 lb_{f})
- Specific impulse: 446 s (4.37 km/s)
- Burn time: 731 seconds
- Propellant: LH_{2} / LOX

Ariane 3 (French: [aʁjan tʁwɑ]) was a European expendable carrier rocket, which was used for eleven launches between 1984 and 1989. It was a member of the Ariane family of rockets. The principal manufacturer for the Ariane 3 was Aérospatiale, while the lead agency for its development was the Centre National d'Études Spatiales (CNES).

Development of the Ariane 3 was authorised in July 1979, months prior to the Ariane 1's first flight. Drawing heavily upon both the design and infrastructure of the Ariane 1, the new launcher was concurrently developed alongside the Ariane 2, with which it shared much of its design. It represented an advancement of the Ariane 1 rather than a replacement, but was capable of lifting even heavier payloads into geostationary transfer orbit (GTO) as well as launching two satellites via one launch. Developed largely within a two year window, the Ariane 3 performed its maiden flight on 4 August 1984, actually flying in advance of its Ariane 2 sibling. During its brief service life, having performed its final launch on 12 July 1989, the Ariane family had become increasingly commercially competitive, becoming the market leading heavy launch vehicle in the world by the late 1980s.

== Development ==
In 1973, eleven nations decided to pursue joint collaboration in the field of space exploration and formed a new pan-national organisation to undertake this mission, the European Space Agency (ESA). Six years later, in December 1979, the arrival of a capable European expendable launch system was marked when the first Ariane 1 rocket launcher was successfully launched from the Guiana Space Centre at Kourou, French Guiana. The Ariane 1 soon became considered to be a capable and competitive launcher in comparison to the rival platforms offered by the Soviet Union and the United States. However, even prior to the launcher having entering service, there was a strong desire to quickly produce improved derivatives that would be able to handle even greater payloads than Ariane 1 could. These desires would result in the creation of both the Ariane 2 and Ariane 3.

While the initiative was first proposed in 1978, prior to the Ariane 1's first flight, approval to commence the first phase of development was not received until July 1979. The bulk of development work on the new launcher occurred between 1980 and 1982. The Ariane 3 was designed to satisfy the future demand for the delivery of two tonne payloads into a geosynchronous transfer orbit (GTO). According to aerospace historian Brian Harvey, in spite of the numbering sequence adopted, the Ariane 3 was the direct successor to the Ariane 1, rather than the Ariane 2, as could be logically assumed. The principal agency behind the development of the Ariane 3 was the Centre National d'Études Spatiales (CNES), while the lead company for its production was the French aerospace manufacturer Aérospatiale.

In order to keep costs down, CNES directed that only tested technologies could be implemented in the launcher's improvements; in fact, no budget was provided for new test series to be performed. Furthermore, it was restricted to using the existing launch pad and handling facilities established for the Ariane 1, and that there was to be no allowance for retooling of the Ariane production line. However, one new piece of infrastructure that was permitted was the establishment of tracking equipment in the Ivory Coast; the existing infrastructure based in Brazil used by the Ariane 1 was less suitable due to the increased performance of the Ariane 3, which flew a different ascent profile that reached 250 km, rather than 200 km before coasting into orbit. Performance boosts were achieved via several different ways, such as the elongated third stage fuel tanks to carry 30 per cent more fuel, elevated combustion pressure in multiple stages, a new intertank structure that supported the addition of solid-fuel boosters, and the adoption of a new fuel mixture.

The finalised Ariane 3 followed the same basic design as the earlier Ariane 1, but incorporated numerous modifications that had been made for the Ariane 2. Unlike the Ariane 2, two solid-fuelled PAP strap-on booster rockets were used to augment the first stage at liftoff. The core of the Ariane 3 was essentially identical to that of the Ariane 2. The first stage was powered by four Viking 2B bipropellant engines, burning UH 25 (25% straight hydrazine, 75% UDMH) in a dinitrogen tetroxide oxidiser. The second stage was powered by a Viking 4B, which used the same fuel-oxidiser combination. The third stage used a cryogenically fuelled HM7B engine, burning liquid hydrogen in liquid oxygen. On some flights, a Mage 2 kick motor was flown as a fourth stage. One atypical modification for the era was the revised satellite deployment system, which could facilitate the launch of two smaller satellites as well as one larger one.

The Ariane 3's design heavily influenced that of its successor, the Ariane 4; while the design team considered various approaches for achieving such a launcher, one of the studied concepts had involved the addition of a fifth engine to an enlarged first stage of the Ariane 3. However, this was determined to have involved a very high level of redesign work; an alternative approach was instead adopted, in which the first stage was elongated to hold 210 tonnes of propellant instead of the 145 tonnes present on the Ariane 3. While the second and third stages of the Ariane 4 remained identical to the Ariane 3, a range of strap-on boosters were developed to be applied to the type, designed to gradually increase the rocket's payload capacity. Overall, the Ariane 4 was 15 per cent smaller than the Ariane 3. It was effectively an improved and developed derivative of the earlier Ariane 3, primarily differing through the application of various solid-fuelled and liquid-fuelled boosters, the latter being the only all-new design feature of the Ariane 4.

== Launch history ==
The Ariane 3 made its maiden flight on 4 August 1984, almost two years before the Ariane 2's first launch, placing the ECS-2 and Télécom 1A satellites into geosynchronous transfer orbit (GTO). The ESA opted for a calculated risk on the first launch, saving €60 million, by performing a commercial launch with the very first flight of the Ariane 3. This was perhaps even more daring as not only was this flight using a new launcher but also the new capability to launch two satellites at once. The gamble paid off, as the launch was a complete success. At the time of the Ariane 3's maiden flight, the United States still held a majority of the global launcher market; by the end of the year, the order books were shifting in favour of the Ariane family, having outstanding orders to launch 30 satellites at a cumulative cost of €1 billion.

Eleven Ariane 3 launchers were launched with ten successes and one failure. The failure occurred on the fifth flight, launched on 12 September 1985, when the third stage failed to ignite resulting in the rocket failing to achieve orbit. The ECS-3 and Spacenet-3 satellites were lost in the failure. Despite this sole loss, the reliability of the Ariane family meant that insurance costs for the launcher were actually less than that of rival American launchers. Throughout the 1980s, the platform became increasingly competitive on the global stage.

According to Harvey, the Ariane family had become the dominant series of launchers on the world market as early as 1986. Despite its relative success, the Ariane 3 was quickly replaced by the even more capable Ariane 4, resulting in the launcher only conducting a comparatively small number of launches. The Ariane 3 conducted its final flight on 12 July 1989, carrying the Olympus F1 satellite.
