= Satellites of Turkey =

List of national programs

This is a list of satellites of Turkey.

== Satellites ==
Large Communications Satellites

Satellite	Developed/Built by	Launch Date	Launch site	Launcher	Mass	Status	Note
(Turkey) Türksat 1A	(France) Aérospatiale	24 January 1994	(European Union) ELA-2 Guiana Space Centre	(European Union) Ariane-44LP H10+	1,743 kg (3,843 lb)	Failed	
(Turkey) Türksat 1B	(France) Aérospatiale	10 August 1994	(European Union) ELA-2 Guiana Space Centre	(European Union) Ariane-44LP H10+	1,743 kg (3,843 lb)	Decommissioned (2006)	
(Turkey) Türksat 1C	(France) Aérospatiale	9 July 1996	(European Union) ELA-2 Guiana Space Centre	(European Union) Ariane-44L H10-3	1,743 kg (3,843 lb)	Decommissioned (2010)	
(Turkey) Türksat 2A	(France) (Italy) Thales Alenia Space	10 January 2001	(European Union) ELA-2 Guiana Space Centre	(European Union) Ariane-44P H10-3	3,530 kg (7,780 lb)	Decommissioned (2016)	Eurasiasat 1
(Turkey) Türksat 3A	(France) (Italy) Thales Alenia Space	12 June 2008	(European Union) ELA-3 Guiana Space Centre	(European Union) Ariane 5ECA	3,110 kg (6,860 lb)	In Service	
(Turkey) Türksat 4A	(Japan) Mitsubishi Electric (MELCO)	14 February 2014	(Kazakhstan) Baikonur Cosmodrome Site 81/24	(Russia) Proton-M/Briz-M	4,850 kg (10,690 lb)	In Service	
(Turkey) Türksat 4B	(Japan) Mitsubishi Electric (MELCO)	16 October 2015	(Kazakhstan) Baikonur Cosmodrome Site 200/39	(Russia) Proton-M/Briz-M	4,924 kg (10,856 lb)	In Service	
(Turkey) Türksat 5A	(European Union) Airbus Defence and Space	8 January 2021	(United States) Cape Canaveral SLC-40	(United States) Falcon 9 Block 5	3,500 kg (7,700 lb)	In Service	
(Turkey) Türksat 5B	(European Union) Airbus Defence and Space	19 December 2021	(United States) Cape Canaveral SLC-40	(United States) Falcon 9 Block 5	4,500 kg (9,900 lb)	In Service	
(Turkey) Türksat 6A	(Turkey) TÜBİTAK Space Technologies Research Institute	9 July 2024	(United States) Cape Canaveral SLC-40	(United States) Falcon 9 Block 5	4,250 kg (9,370 lb)	In Service	

Earth Observation/Reconnaissance Satellites
Satellite	Developed by	Launch Date	Launch site	Launcher	Mass	Status	Note
(Turkey) BİLSAT-1	(Turkey) TÜBİTAK Space Technologies Research Institute	27 September 2003	(Russia) Plesetsk 132/1	(Russia) Kosmos-3M	130 kg (290 lb)	Decommissioned (2006)	
(Turkey) RASAT	(Turkey) TÜBİTAK Space Technologies Research Institute	17 August 2011	(Russia) Dombarovsky 370/13	(Russia) Dnepr	93 kg (205 lb)	Decommissioned (2022)	
(Turkey) GÖKTÜRK-2	Scientific and Technological Research Council of Turkey/ TÜBİTAK Space Technologies Research Institute	18 December 2012	(China) Jiuquan LA-4/SLS-2	(China) Chang Zheng 2D	400 kg (880 lb)	In Service	
(Turkey) GÖKTÜRK-1	(Italy) (France) Telespazio / (Turkey) Turkish Aerospace Industries	5 December 2016	(Europe) Kourou ELV	(Europe) Vega flight VV08	1,060 kg (2,340 lb)	In Service	
(Turkey) İMECE	(Turkey) TÜBİTAK Space Technologies Research Institute	15 April 2023	(United States) Cape Canaveral SLC-40	(United States) Falcon 9 Block 5	800 kg (1,800 lb)	In Service	
(Turkey) Fergani FGN-100-d1	(Turkey) Fergani Space	14 January 2025	(United States) Vandenberg Space Force Base	(United States) Falcon 9 Block 5	100 kg (220 lb)	In Service	Launched with Transporter 12 mission.
(Turkey) Micro Satellite	(Turkey) Turkish Aerospace Industries	2027 (Planned)	N/A	N/A	150 kg (330 lb)	Planned	
(Turkey) GÖKTÜRK-Y	(Turkey) Turkish Aerospace Industries	2026-2027 (Planned)	N/A	N/A	1,000 kg (2,200 lb)	Planned	It will replace GÖKTÜRK-1. Göktürk-1Y variant is expected to launch in 2026.
(Turkey) GÖKTÜRK-3	(Turkey) Turkish Aerospace Industries/ TÜBİTAK Space Technologies Research Institute/Aselsan	2028 (Planned)	N/A	N/A	1,000 kg (2,200 lb)	Planned	Göktürk-3 developed by TAI, Aselsan and TUBITAK UZAY was aiming for a 2025 launch, which was later postponed to 2028.
(Turkey) İMECE-2	(Turkey) TÜBİTAK Space Technologies Research Institute	2027 (Planned)	N/A	N/A	N/A	Planned	
(Turkey) İMECE-3	(Turkey) TÜBİTAK Space Technologies Research Institute	2028 (Planned)	N/A	N/A	N/A	Planned	
(Turkey) ULUĞ BEY	(Turkey) Fergani Space	2025-2030 (Planned)	N/A	N/A	N/A	Planned	Fergani Space is planning to launch 100 satellites, which will form the ULUĞ BEY national global positioning system.

Cube/Nano/Pico Satellites
Satellite	Developed by	Mission type	Launch Date	Launch site	Launcher	Mass	Status	Note
(Turkey) ITUpSAT1	(Turkey) Istanbul Technical University/Faculty of Aeronautics and Astronautics	Educational and technology demonstration/Earth observation	23 September 2009	(India) Satish Dhawan FLP	(India) PSLV-C14	990 g (35 oz)	in service	
(Turkey) TürkSAT-3USAT	(Turkey) Istanbul Technical University/ Space Systems Design and Test Laboratory and Radio Frequency Electronics Laboratory	Amateur radio communications and engineering data collection	26 April 2013	(China) Jiuquan LA-4/SLS-2	(China) Chang Zheng 2D	4 kg (8.8 lb)	Decommissioned	
(Turkey) BeEagleSAT	(Turkey) Istanbul Technical University	Scientific research	18 April 2017	(United States) Cape Canaveral SLC-40	(United States) Atlas V	1 kg (2.2 lb)	Decommissioned	
(Turkey) HAVELSAT	(Turkey) Istanbul Technical University	Technology demonstration and scientific research	18 April 2017	(United States) Cape Canaveral SLC-40	(United States) Atlas V	1 kg (2.2 lb)	Decommissioned	
(Turkey) UBAKUSAT	(Turkey) Istanbul Technical University	Technology demonstration and amateur radio communications	2 April 2018	(United States) Kennedy LC-39A	(United States) Falcon 9 FT, CRS-14	3 kg (6.6 lb)	Decommissioned	
(Turkey) ASELSAT	(Turkey) ASELSAN	Technology demonstration	13 January 2021	(United States) Kennedy LC-39A	(United States) Falcon 9 Block 5	3 kg (6.6 lb)	In Service	
(Turkey) GRIZU-263A	(Turkey) Bülent Ecevit University	Scientific research and educational purposes	13 January 2022	(United States) Cape Canaveral SLC-40	(United States) Falcon 9 Block 5	1 kg (2.2 lb)	In Service	
(Turkey) Plan-S Connecta-T1.1	(Turkey) PLAN-S	IoT Communication and Earth Observation	25 May 2022	(United States) Cape Canaveral SLC-40	(United States) Falcon 9 Block 5	4 kg (8.8 lb)	In Service	Test satellite
(Turkey) Plan-S Connecta-T1.2	(Turkey) PLAN-S	IoT Communication and Earth Observation	3 January 2023	(United States) Cape Canaveral SLC-40	(United States) Falcon 9 Block 5	4 kg (8.8 lb)	In Service	Test satellite
(Turkey) TÜBITAK UZAY SSS-2B	(Turkey) TÜBİTAK Space Technologies Research Institute	Technology demonstration	14 April 2023	(United States) Vandenberg Space Force Base	(United States) Falcon 9 Block 5	3 kg (6.6 lb)	In Service	
(Turkey) Plan-S Connecta-T2.1	(Turkey) PLAN-S	Earth observation and IoT connectivity	15 April 2023	(United States) Cape Canaveral SLC-40	(United States) Falcon 9 Block 5	6 kg (13 lb)	In Service	
(Turkey) Plan-S Connecta-T3.1	(Turkey) PLAN-S	IoT Communication and Earth Observation	11 November 2023	(United States) Vandenberg Space Force Base	(United States) Falcon 9 Block 5	6 kg (13 lb)	In Service	
(Turkey) Plan-S Connecta-T3.2	(Turkey) PLAN-S	IoT Communication and Earth Observation	11 November 2023	(United States) Vandenberg Space Force Base	(United States) Falcon 9 Block 5	6 kg (13 lb)	In Service	
(Turkey) Plan-S IoT Connecta - 1,2,3,4	(Turkey) PLAN-S	IoT Communication and Earth Observation	16 August 2024	(United States) Vandenberg Space Force Base	(United States) Falcon 9 Block 5	6U	In Service	First four were launched in 16 August 2024 with Transporter 11 mission.
(Turkey) Plan-S IoT Connecta - 5,6,7,8	(Turkey) PLAN-S	IoT Communication and Earth Observation	14 January 2025	(United States) Vandenberg Space Force Base	(United States) Falcon 9 Block 5	6U	In Service	Second four were launched in 14 January 2025 with Transporter 12 mission.
(Turkey) SkyLink-1 & 2	(Turkey) Hello Space	IoT Communication and Earth Observation	14 January 2025	(United States) Vandenberg Space Force Base	(United States) Falcon 9 Block 5	3P	In Service	Launched with Transporter 12 mission.
(Turkey) ITU SSDTL	(Turkey) Istanbul Technical University	Rubidium Atomic Frequency Standard (RAFS) based atomic clock in low earth orbit towards (LEO) use in national GNSS satellites	14 January 2025	(United States) Vandenberg Space Force Base	(United States) Falcon 9 Block 5	6U	In Service	Launched with Transporter 12 mission.
(Pakistan) PAUSAT-1	(Turkey) Istanbul Technical University/ Pakistan Air University	High-resolution multispectral imager in Low Earth Orbit	14 January 2025	(United States) Vandenberg Space Force Base	(United States) Falcon 9 Block 5	16U	In Service	Launched with Transporter 12 mission.
(Turkey) Plan-S IoT Connecta - 4 satellites	(Turkey) PLAN-S	IoT Communication and Earth Observation	2025 (Planned)	N/A	N/A	N/A	Planned	PLAN-S will launch more than 100 satellites
(Turkey) Plan-S IoT Connecta - 8 satellites	(Turkey) PLAN-S	IoT Communication and Earth Observation	2025 (Planned)	N/A	N/A	N/A	Planned	PLAN-S will launch more than 100 satellites
(Turkey) Plan-S IoT Connecta - 8 satellites	(Turkey) PLAN-S	IoT Communication and Earth Observation	2025 (Planned)	N/A	N/A	N/A	Planned	PLAN-S will launch more than 100 satellites
(Turkey) Plan-S IoT Connecta - 16 satellites	(Turkey) PLAN-S	IoT Communication and Earth Observation	2026 (Planned)	N/A	N/A	N/A	Planned	PLAN-S will launch more than 100 satellites
(Turkey) Plan-S IoT Connecta - 16 satellites	(Turkey) PLAN-S	IoT Communication and Earth Observation	2027 (Planned)	N/A	N/A	N/A	Planned	PLAN-S will launch more than 100 satellites
