= Gölbaşı Ground Station =

The Gölbaşı Ground Station (Turkish: Gölbaşı Uydu Yer Kontrol Merkezi) is a ground station designed as a terminal for telecommunication with Türksat spacecraft. Owned and operated by the state-owned telecommunications provider Türksat company, it is situated in Gölbaşı district of Ankara Province in Turkey. The earth station was launched on 11 August 1994 to service Turkey's first communications satellite Türksat 1B. Its backup facility was on the campus of Middle East Technical University (ODTÜ), about 40 km (25 mi) away. The ground station consists of equipment including 9-meter (30 ft) and 11-meter (36 ft) parabolic antennas, electronic devices, data processing system and uninterrupted power supply unit for telecommunication with the Türksat 1C, 2A 3A satellites in orbit. The backup station has a 9-meter (30 ft) antenna available.

The facility features, in full backup, a satellite control center, an observation and control center, a communications observation center and a data encryption center. A satellite simulator provides training for the operators, and is also used for approval of procedures to be applied on the spacecraft.

Since the ground station in Gölbaşı is capable of servicing no more than three satellites at a time, it is projected to expand its capacity with regard of the launch of Türksat 4A satellite in 2014. The construction of a backup ground station in Konya is planned.

== Earthquake risk ==
On December 20, 2007, an earthquake of 5.7 magnitude occurred in Balâ, Ankara, about 15 km (9.3 mi) far from Gölbaşı Ground Station. Although the ground station was not affected by the earthquake, the incident showed the possible risk of telecommunication blackout and loss of satellites in orbit in case of an earthquake. Due to proximity of the backup facility to the ground station, the earthquake risk is much high. It is required that the backup facility's location should be at least 200 km (120 mi) away.

A report states that when the link between the spacecraft and the earth station is interrupted for a period of 48 hours, the reestablishment of the link is unlikely.
