= Türksat =

Türksat may refer to:

- Türksat (company)
- Türksat (satellite)
