= Türksat (satellite) =

Turkish communications satellites

Türksat is the name of a series of Turkish communications satellites operated or projected by the state-owned Türksat A.Ş.

Satellite telecommunication is provided by the Gölbaşı Ground Station in Ankara, Turkey.

== Missions ==
Satellite	Launch Date	Launch site	Launcher	Mass	Status	Note
(Turkey) Türksat 1A	24 January 1994	(European Union) ELA-2 Guiana Space Centre	(European Union) Ariane-44LP H10+	1,743 kg (3,843 lb)	Failed	
(Turkey) Türksat 1B	10 August 1994	(European Union) ELA-2 Guiana Space Centre	(European Union) Ariane-44LP H10+	1,743 kg (3,843 lb)	Decommissioned (2006)	
(Turkey) Türksat 1C	9 July 1996	(European Union) ELA-2 Guiana Space Centre	(European Union) Ariane-44L H10-3	1,743 kg (3,843 lb)	Decommissioned (2010)	
(Turkey) Türksat 2A	10 January 2001	(European Union) ELA-2 Guiana Space Centre	(European Union) Ariane-44P H10-3	3,530 kg (7,780 lb)	Decommissioned (2016)	Eurasiasat 1
(Turkey) Türksat 3A	12 June 2008	(European Union) ELA-3 Guiana Space Centre	(European Union) Ariane 5ECA	3,110 kg (6,860 lb)	In Service	
(Turkey) Türksat 4A	14 February 2014	(Kazakhstan) Baikonur Cosmodrome Site 81/24	(Russia) Proton-M/Briz-M	4,850 kg (10,690 lb)	In Service	
(Turkey) Türksat 4B	16 October 2015	(Kazakhstan) Baikonur Cosmodrome Site 200/39	(Russia) Proton-M/Briz-M	4,924 kg (10,856 lb)	In Service	
(Turkey) Türksat 5A	8 January 2021	(United States) Cape Canaveral SLC-40	(United States) Falcon 9 Block 5	3,500 kg (7,700 lb)	In Service	
(Turkey) Türksat 5B	19 December 2021	(United States) Cape Canaveral SLC-40	(United States) Falcon 9 Block 5	4,500 kg (9,900 lb)	In Service	
(Turkey) Türksat 6A	8 July 2024	(United States) Cape Canaveral SLC-40	(United States) Falcon 9 Block 5	4,250 kg (9,370 lb)	In Service	

== Satellites ==
=== Türksat 1A ===
Türksat 1A was the first attempt of the project and launched by Ariane 4 from Centre Spatial Guyanais in Kourou, French Guiana on 24 January 1994. Due to the failure of the launcher, the satellite exploded in the atmosphere before reaching its orbit.

=== Türksat 1B ===
After the loss of Turksat 1A, Türksat 1B was successfully located at 42°E orbit on 11 August 1994. After the orbital tests, Turksat 1B was put into service on 10 October 1994. Turksat 1B has three different coverage areas, Turkey, Central Europe and Central Asia. The satellite carries 16 transponders, 10 of 36 MHz, 6 of 72 MHz operating in K_{u}-band (11–14 GHz). There are 4 transponder switching capability between Turkey and Central Europe, and 3 between Turkey and Central Asia. Turksat 1B provides TV and radio broadcasting, data and telephone transmissions. On the other hand, TES (Telephony Earth Station) Project and Internet Broadcasting Systems (including 40 southeast rural area IBS) are also transmitting from Türksat 1B.

=== Türksat 1C ===
After the Turksat 1A launch failure, Aérospatiale Company started building a new satellite under the insurance terms of the Turkey system contract. Modifying the contract with Aérospatiale, Türksat 1C coverage area was enlarged by two big zones different from Turksat 1B coverage areas. Turksat 1C was designed for covering Turkey on west spot and Europe on east spot so as to serve simultaneously between Turkey and Europe with Turkey and Central Asia and to provide direct connection between Europe and Central Asia. Turksat 1C was successfully launched at 31.3°E position on 10 July 1996. Completing the orbital tests, this satellite shifted from longitude 31.3°E to 42°E. After this process which took 17 days, the broadcast traffic of the Turksat 1B was transferred to Turksat 1C. Finally when these processes finished Turksat 1B was shifted with similar orbital manoeuvres to 31.3°E position. On 16 July 2008, all traffic on Turksat 1C was transferred to Turksat 3A. After this date Turksat 1C was shifted at 31.3°E. It is being used in inclined orbit.

=== Türksat 2A ===
Turksat Satellite Systems continued progress regarding the need of new satellites having multiple channels, larger coverage, and backup capability like the other satellite operator satellites in the international market. To serve with a larger coverage area for resident customers and to compete with the other satellite operators in the literal sense, the new satellite would be located at the same position with Turksat 1C. Türk Telekom set up a joint venture company with Aérospatiale (merged by Alcatel Space, then Thales Alenia Space), called EurasiaSat, which would be in charge of purchasing a new-generation satellite named Turksat 2A (also known as Eurasiasat 1). Turksat 2A started commercial service on 1 February 2001, with the same 42°E location as Turksat 1C.

Turksat 2A satellite carries a payload of 34 high-powered transponders consisting of 22 - 33 MHz fixed-beam transponders and 12 36 - MHz transponders with two steerable beams.

Turksat 2A BSS Band fixed-beam transponders have two coverage zones like Turksat 1C:

1. West Zone covers the British Isles in the west, Scandinavian countries in the north, North Africa in the south, and Caspian Sea in the east.
2. East Zone covers the Balkan Peninsula in the west, Russian Federation in the north, Pakistan in the south, and China national boundary in the east.

Inside of the footprint such as south Asia and Republic of South Africa can be accessed over the Turksat 2A FSS Band steerable-beam transponders.

On 18 September 2014, all traffic on Turksat 2A was transferred to Turksat 4A. However, Turksat 2A will broadcast a few TV channels until its end of mission in 2016.

=== Türksat 3A ===
Turksat 3A satellite will enable Turksat to offer telecommunication services as well as direct TV broadcasting services through a broader area than its existing satellites covering Turkey, Europe, Middle East, North Africa and Central Asia. With the help of its switchable transponders, Turksat 3A will act as a bridge between Europe and Asia. Türksat 3A's Turkey coverage has been specially designed to provide very efficient gain for broadband applications like VSAT services giving customers low-cost, up-link systems.

Based on Thales Alenia Space Spacebus 4000B2, Turksat 3A is fitted with 24 Ku-band transponders and offers beginning of life power of about 8 kW. Positioned at 42°E, Turksat 3A will weight 3060 kg at launch and will replace Turksat 1C satellite.

Turksat 3A was launched by Arianespace atop an Ariane 5ECA launch vehicle, along with the British Skynet 5C satellite, in a dual-payload launch on 12 June 2008 at 22:05:02 UTC, from ELA-3 at the Centre Spatial Guyanais.

=== Türksat 4A ===
Turksat 4A was successfully launched from the Baikonur Cosmodrome at 23:09 UTC on 14 February 2014. After three months of orbital and subsystem tests, Turksat 4A was successfully transferred from its temporary orbit at 50°E to a position at 42°E. The satellite started broadcasting on 15 July 2014.

With Turksat 4A, Turksat AS offers telecommunication and direct TV broadcasting services throughout Turkey, as well as in Europe, Central Asia, the Middle East and Africa. Turksat 4A provides Ku-band high-power direct TV broadcasting channels and both C- and Ka-band communications channels.

=== Türksat 4B ===
Turksat 4B was successfully launched from the Baikonur Cosmodrome at 20:40 UTC on 16 October 2015.

== Bibliography ==
- (in French and English) Guy Lebègue, Aérospatiale, Cannes, France, (trad. Robert J. Amral), « Turksat: A Turnkey Satellite », in Revue aerospatiale, N°72, October 1990, ISSN 0994-9003
