= Timeline of broadcasting in Turkey =

Below is the milestones of Turkish radio TV broadcasting. The oldest broadcaster in Turkey is TRT, the public broadcaster, which now broadcasts 6 nationwide, 6 regional, 1 local and 2 international radio channels as well as 11 TV nationwide and 2 international TV channels. But after the 1990s, many private radio and TV companies began broadcasting, some nationwide and some local.

Date	Event
6.5.1927	First radio broadcast in Istanbul
8.9.1936	Radio broadcasting monopoly transferred to Turkish PTT
22.5.1940	Law (3837) about transferring Radio broadcasting monopoly to General Directorate of Press (Old Turkish:Matbuat Umum Müdürlüğü)
3.9.1952	First television channel (Istanbul Technical University trial broadcasting) ITU TV
2.1.1964	Turkish Radio Television law (359) establishing General Directorate of Turkish Radio and Television Corporation (TRT)
31.1.1968	First monochrome TV broadcast on VHF band
19.5.1969	First live broadcast from a location out of Ankara where the continuity studio is. ( A program about the anniversary of Atatürk’s arrival in Samsun.)
29.2.1972	Law (1568) about the neutrality of TRT.
26.8.1972	First international live broadcast from Munich Olympics
9.9.1974	First 24-hour radio broadcast
22.3.1975	TRT represents Turkey in the Eurovision Song Contest. (Turkish performer takes the last place. But in later years, Turkish performers receive better results: in 1997 third place, in 2003 first place, in 2004 fourth place and in 2010 second place.)
14.4.1978	First FM radio broadcast
14.1.1983	Radio television law (2954) establishing Radio and Television Supreme Council (RTÜK)
15.3.1984	First color TV (PAL system)
1.10.1984	First stereophonic broadcast in FM radio transmitters (Zenith GE pilot tone system)
11.7.1986	Protocol with PTT about satellite transmission
15.9.1986	A second channel in TV, first utilization of UHF band
21.1.1989	Law (3517) about transferring radio and TV transmitters to PTT. (By this law hundreds of Radio and TV transmitters and more than 1300 operating personnel were transferred to PTT on 28.2.1989)
20.5.1989	First private TV in Turkey (using satellite broadcasting, DBS) The name of the company: Magic box and the name of the channel: Star
3.5.1993	Amendment of the Turkish constitution (art. 133) to enable private radio TV broadcasting
10.6.1994	Law (4000) to issue Türk Telekom from PTT. Along with telephone infrastructure, both the transmitters and the satellite infrastructure in Türk Telekom. The transfer on 24.4.1995
11.8.1994	First Turkish satellite. Turksat 1B operated by Türksat, an affiliated company of PTT (Türk Telekom). Both TRT and the private companies began using satellite both for Direct broadcast satellite (DBS) and for TVRO/RRO.
6.7.1999	Law (4397) about transferring radio and TV transmitters back to TRT. (By this law more than 2000 transmitters and more than 1500 operating personnel were transferred to TRT on 31.12.1999.)
21.4.2005	According to law (5335) Türksat is also responsible in cable television distribution.

== See also ==
- Radio and television technology in Turkey
