= Turkish Aerospace Industries headquarters attack =

Suicide attack in Turkey

- Part of the Kurdish–Turkish conflict and the Kurdistan Workers' Party insurgency
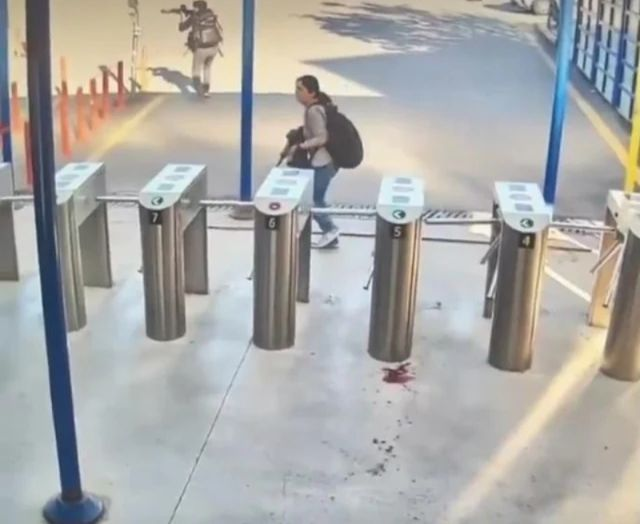
- Attackers on security cameras
- Location: 40°04′57″N 32°35′03″E; Kahramankazan, Ankara, Turkey
- Date: 23 October 2024; 3:26 p.m. (TRT)
- Target: Turkish Space Systems, Integration and Test Center
- Attack type: Bombings, Suicide Bombing and mass shooting
- Weapons: AKS-74Us, M67 grenades and explosives
- Deaths: 7 (including both perpetrators)
- Injuries: 22
- Perpetrator: Kurdistan Workers' Party
- Assailants: Ali "Rojger" Örek †; Mine Sevjin Alçiçek †

On 23 October 2024, seven people were killed and twenty-two people were injured in an armed attack on the headquarters of Turkish Aerospace Industries (TAI) in Kahramankazan, Ankara, Turkey. The two attackers were later killed. The Kurdistan Workers' Party (PKK) claimed responsibility for the attack. The attack was widely condemned and has been considered an act of terrorism by Turkish officials. In retaliation, the Turkish military conducted airstrikes on positions in Iraq and Syria, which killed at least 12 civilians and wounded 25 more according to the Syrian Democratic Forces.

== Background ==
TAI is one of Turkey's major companies specializing in defense and aviation manufacturing. Its projects include the TAI TF Kaan, Turkey's first domestically produced fighter jet. The incident happened as a major trade fair for the defense and aerospace industries was being held in Istanbul, which had received a visit from Ukrainian foreign minister Andrii Sybiha the week before.

The attack happened a day after the leader of the Nationalist Movement Party, Devlet Bahçeli, who is an ally of President Recep Tayyip Erdoğan, suggested that Abdullah Öcalan, the imprisoned leader of the Kurdistan Workers' Party (PKK), might be given parole if he agreed to stop using violence and dissolves his group.

== Attack ==
On 23 October 2024, at around 3:26 p.m. (TRT), the attack coincided with the shift change of approximately 7,500 employees at the Space Systems, Integration and Test Center at the headquarters of Turkish Aerospace Industries in Kahramankazan, Ankara, Turkey.

Two attackers arrived by a taxi before detonating an explosive beside it, firing automatic rifles and entering the complex. A large fire later broke out at the site. In a separate video verified by CNN, CCTV footage shows attackers wearing plainclothes carrying a backpack and holding an assault rifle. Staff were evacuated to shelters, while firefighters and medical teams were dispatched to the scene. Clashes were also reported in a nearby car park. The female attacker blew herself up after being injured in a shootout at the entrance of the complex, while the male attacker also blew himself up inside a restroom after being surrounded by security forces and throwing hand grenades at them.

At least seven people were killed in the attack, including the two assailants and the driver of the taxi they rode in, who is believed to have been killed after the attackers boarded his vehicle. They then hid his body in the trunk of the car. The remaining four fatalities were employees of TAI. Twenty-two others were injured, one critically. Seven were police officers assigned to the responding tactical unit.

=== Perpetrators ===
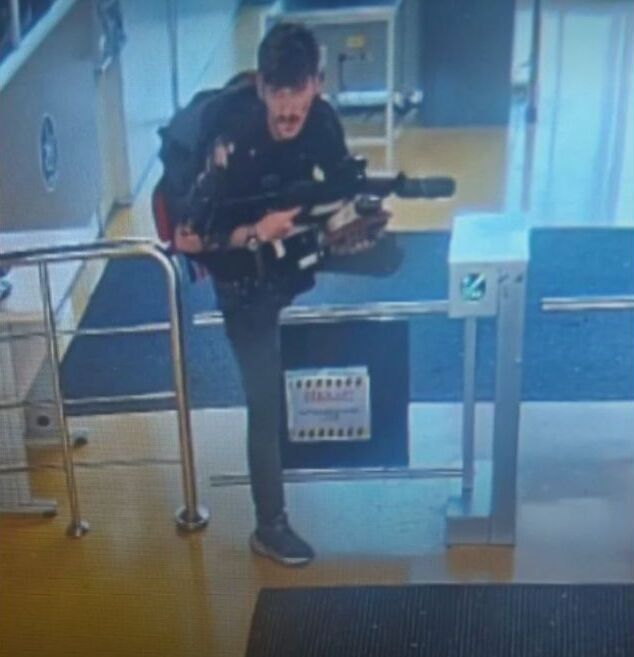
A photo of Örek during the attack

According to the Turkish government, the perpetrators of the attack were members of the PKK, a group designated as a terrorist organization by Turkey, the European Union, and the United States. The male perpetrator was identified as Ali Örek, who had the codename "Rojger" and was born in 1992 in Beytüşşebap, Şırnak Province. The female perpetrator was identified as Mine Sevjin Alçiçek. AKS-74Us, compact assault rifles with optics known to be frequently used by the PKK, were used in the attack.

The PKK claimed responsibility for the attack two days later on 25 October 2024, saying that the attackers were members of its Immortal Battalion. However, the group said that the attack had been planned even before Devlet Bahçeli's offer of parole to Abdullah Öcalan, and said that TAI was targeted for its role in producing weapons that were used in attacks in Kurdish areas.

== Aftermath ==
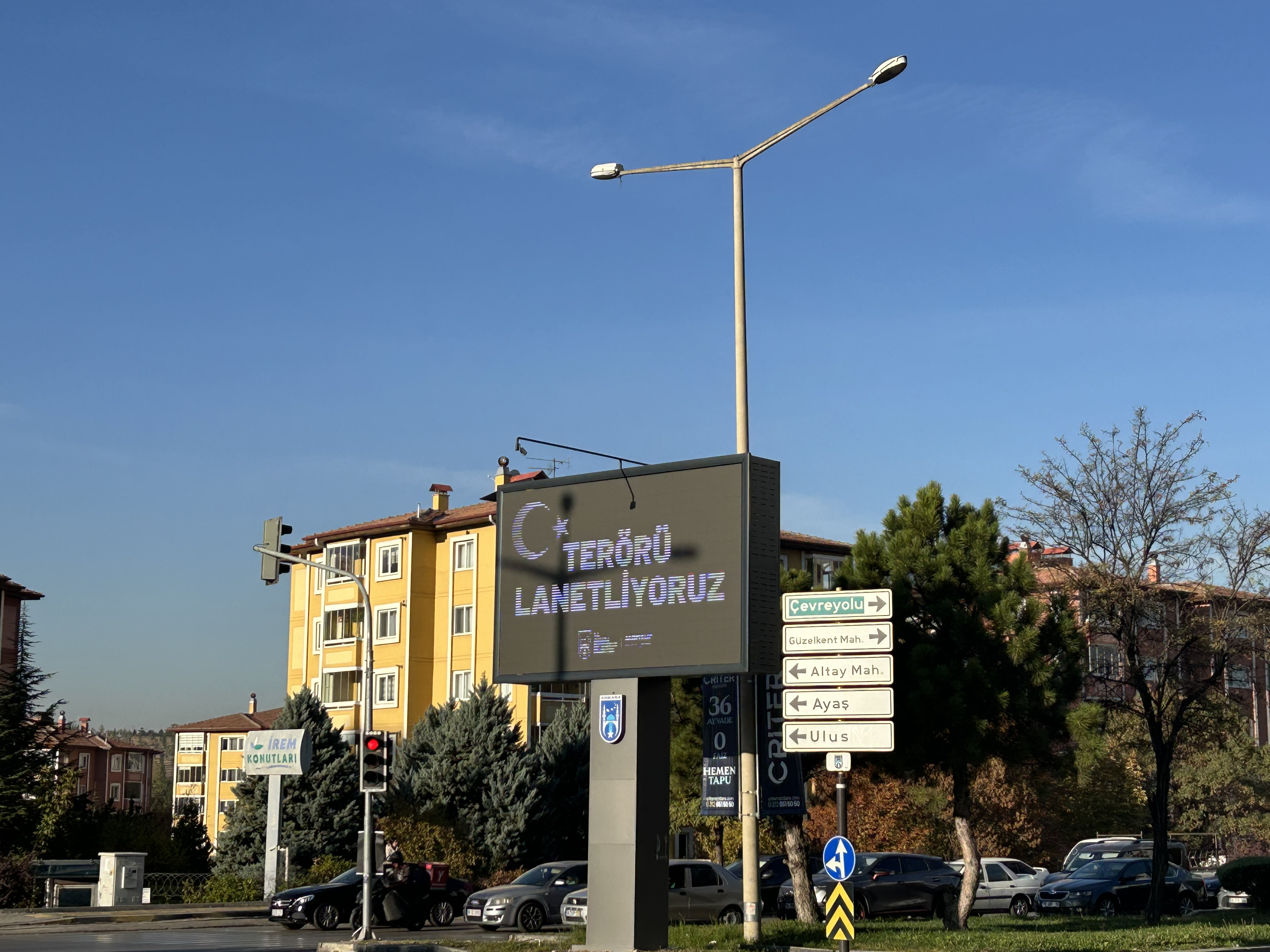
A digital billboard in the Ankara Metropolitan Municipality which translates to "We Condemn Terrorism" after the attack

Ebubekir Şahin, Chairman of the Radio and Television Supreme Council (RTÜK), announced that a broadcasting ban was imposed on the attack. In addition, social media platforms were bandwidth throttled and access to platforms such as X, Instagram, Facebook and YouTube were restricted.

In response, the Turkish military launched strikes on 47 Kurdish rebel positions, including 29 in northern Iraq and 18 in northern Syria. The day after the attacks, the Syrian Democratic Forces accused Turkey of launching a "new wave" of attacks that killed 12 civilians and injured 25 others and struck two train stations and an oil refinery in Al-Malikiyah and Qamishli. Meanwhile, Kamiran Hassan, the mayor of Mawat district in the Sulaymaniyah Governorate of Iraq, said that Mount Asos was targeted twice by Turkish airstrikes. In response to the strikes, the Syrian Democratic Forces, which is dominated by the People's Defense Units (YPG) claimed by Turkey to be an offshoot of the PKK, said that it had launched an internal investigation and denied it had any involvement in the initial attack.

According to the Syrian Observatory for Human Rights, as of 26 October 2024, 17 Syrian civilians have been killed by Turkish drone attacks since 23 October 2024.

Increased security checks were imposed at TAI headquarters and at Istanbul's main airports following the attack. Funerals for some of the victims were held on 24 October.

=== International arrests ===
On 2 December 2024, Italian security services apprehended a PKK militant identified as Velat Çetinkaya in Ciampino, over connections to the attack. The arrest was conducted in cooperation with Interpol.

== Reactions ==
Interior Minister Ali Yerlikaya called the incident a "terrorist attack" and said "Unfortunately, we have martyrs and injured people." Ankara metropolitan mayor Mansur Yavaş said in a statement that he was "deeply saddened" by the news. Justice Minister Yılmaz Tunç announced that the Ankara Chief Public Prosecutor's Office has launched a "judicial investigation" into the incident. The attack was also condemned by Vice President Cevdet Yılmaz, who said that the attack was aimed against Turkey's "success in the defense industry", as well as transport minister Abdulkadir Uraloğlu and Republican People's Party leader and concurrent leader of the opposition Özgür Özel. TAI general manager Mehmet Demiroğlu cut short his attendance at a defence fair to attend to the situation at company headquarters. President Recep Tayyip Erdoğan condemned the attack during a meeting with Russian president Vladimir Putin at the 16th BRICS summit in Russia. Putin also expressed his condolences.

The pro-Kurdish Peoples' Equality and Democracy Party (DEM) condemned the attack while noting that it occurred "just as Turkish society was talking about a solution and the possibility of dialogue", in reference to Devlet Bahçeli's offer of parole to the PKK's Abdullah Öcalan the previous day.

Mark Rutte, secretary-general of NATO, expressed solidarity with Turkey following the attack. Condemnations were also expressed by Algeria, Bangladesh, Iran, Iraq, Lebanon, the Maldives, Pakistan, the European Union and the United States.

== See also ==
- List of filmed mass shootings
- February 2016 Ankara bombing
- March 2016 Ankara bombing
- 2023 Ankara bombing
