= High tech =

Most advanced technology available

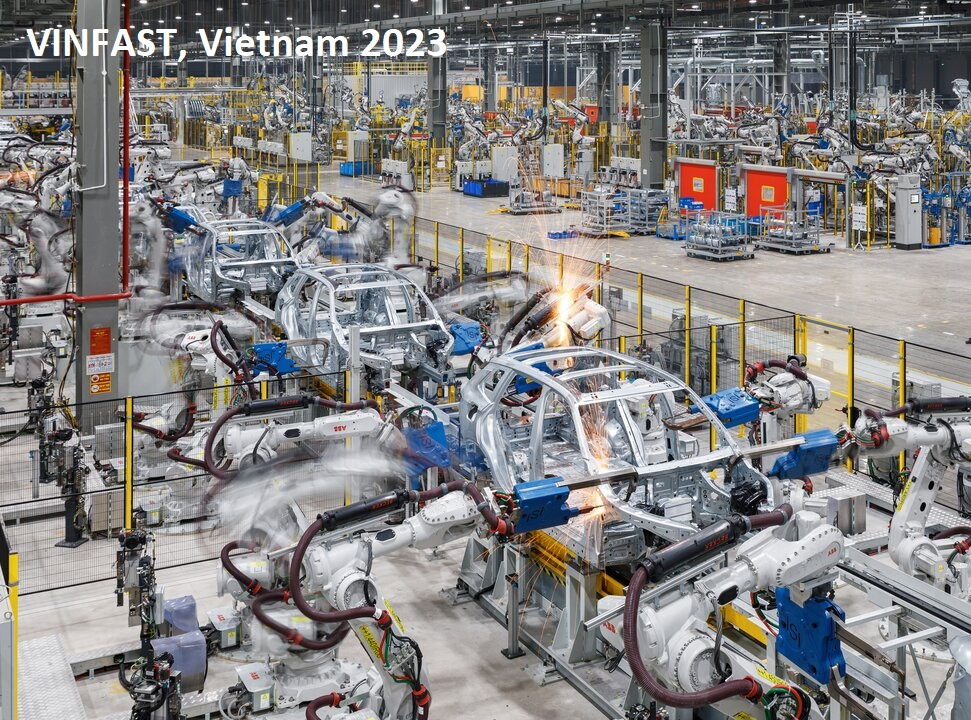
Electrical automotive VinFast plant using industrial robotics technology in Haiphong, Vietnam

High technology (high tech or high-tech), also known as advanced technology (advanced tech), is technology that is at the cutting edge: the highest form of technology available. It can be defined as either the most complex or the newest technology on the market. The opposite of high tech is low technology, referring to simple, often traditional or mechanical technology. When high tech gets old, it can become low tech–for example, vacuum tube electronics. Further, high tech is also in contrast to the concept of mid-tech, technology at a level between the two opposite extreme qualities of low-tech and high tech.

Startups working on high technologies (or developing new high technologies) are sometimes referred to as deep tech; the term may also refer to disruptive innovations or those based on scientific discoveries.

High tech, as opposed to high-touch, may refer to self-service experiences that do not require human interaction.

== History ==
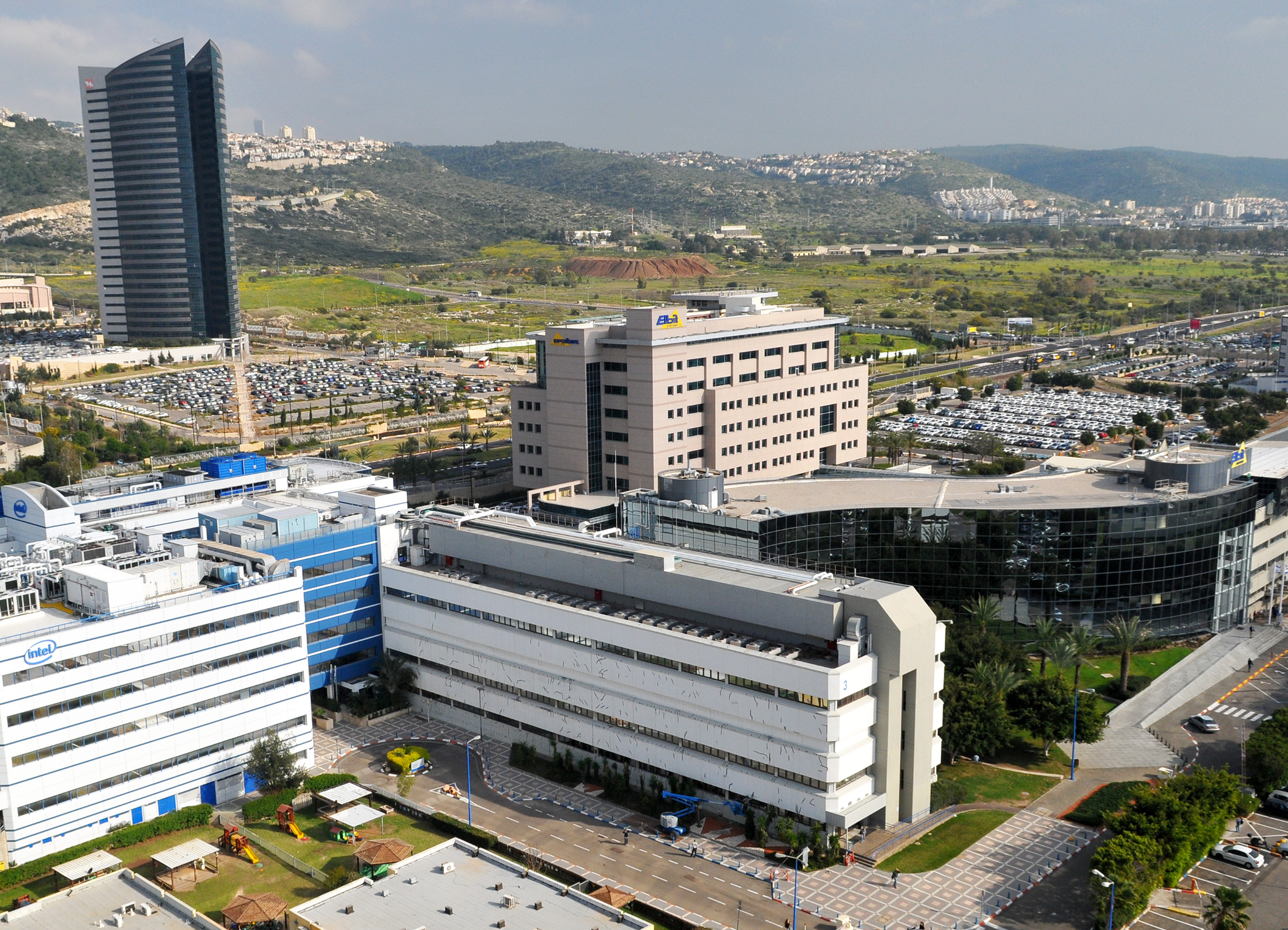
Matam high tech park in Silicon Wadi, Haifa, Israel

The phrase was used in a 1958 The New York Times story advocating "atomic energy" for Europe: "... Western Europe, with its dense population and its high technology ...." Robert Metz used the term in a financial column in 1969, saying Arthur H. Collins of Collins Radio "controls a score of high technology patents in a variety of fields" and in a 1971 article used the abbreviated form, "high tech".

A widely used classification of high-technological industries was provided by the OECD in 2006. It is based on the intensity of research and development activities used in these industries within OECD countries, resulting in four distinct categories.

In the 21st century, the high tech industry is a significant part of several advanced economies. The Israeli economy has the highest ratio in the world, with the high tech sector accounting for 20% of the economy. High tech makes up 9.3% of the American economy according to Statista and CTech.

== Ranking of startup ecosystems ==
Multiple cities and hubs have been described as global startup ecosystems. GSER publishes a yearly ranking of global startup ecosystems. The study does yearly reports ranking the top 40 global startup hubs.

2024 rank	Change from 2023	Hub
1	Steady	(United States) Silicon Valley
2	Steady	(United Kingdom) London
2	Steady	(United States) New York City
4	▲ (1)	(Israel) Tel Aviv
4		(United States) Los Angeles
6		(United States) Boston
7	▲ (1)	Singapore
8	▼ (1)	(China) Beijing
9	▲ (3)	(South Korea) Seoul
10	▲ (5)	(Japan) Tokyo
11	▼ (2)	(China) Shanghai
12	▼ (1)	(United States) Washington, D.C.
13	▲ (1)	(Netherlands) Amsterdam-Delta
14	▲ (4)	(France) Paris
15	▼ (2)	(Germany) Berlin
16	▲ (7)	(United States) Miami
17	▲ (2)	(United States) Chicago
18	▼ (1)	(Canada) Toronto-Waterloo
19	▼ (3)	(United States) San Diego
20	▼ (10)	(United States) Seattle
21		(India) Bengaluru-Karnataka
21		(Australia) Sydney
23		(Sweden) Stockholm
24		(India) Delhi
25	▲ (2)	(United States) Philadelphia
26		(Brazil) São Paulo
27		(United States) Austin
28	▲ (7)	(China) Shenzhen
29		(United States) Atlanta
30		(United States) Denver-Boulder
31	▲ (5)	(Switzerland) Zurich
32	▲ (1)	(Australia) Melbourne
33	▲ (4)	(Germany) Munich
34		(Canada) Vancouver
35		(United States) Salt Lake-Provo
36	▲ (2)	(China) Hangzhou
37		(India) Mumbai
38		(United States) Dallas
39	▲ (1)	(Canada) Montreal
40	▲ (1)	(Denmark) Copenhagen
40		(Finland) Greater Helsinki

== List of countries by high tech exports ==
The following is a list of the 15 largest exporting countries of high tech products by value in billions of United States dollars, according to the United Nations.

#	Country	Value (billion US$)	Year
1	China	825	2023
2	Hong Kong (CN)	369	2023
3	Germany	255	2023
4	United States	232	2024
5	Singapore	197	2023
6	South Korea	163	2023
7	Vietnam	135	2022
8	Malaysia	127	2023
9	France	115	2023
10	Netherlands	110	2023
11	Japan	102	2024
12	Ireland	91	2023
13	Switzerland	89	2024
14	United Kingdom	82	2023
15	Mexico	81	2023

== See also ==
- Electronics
- Electronics industry
- Photonics industry
- Nuclear technology
- Quantum technology
- Intermediate technology – sometimes used to mean technology between low and high technology
- Industrial design
- List of emerging technologies
- Semiconductor industry
- Big Tech
- Innovation
