= Radio and television technology in Turkey =

This article covers the radio and television technology in Turkey.

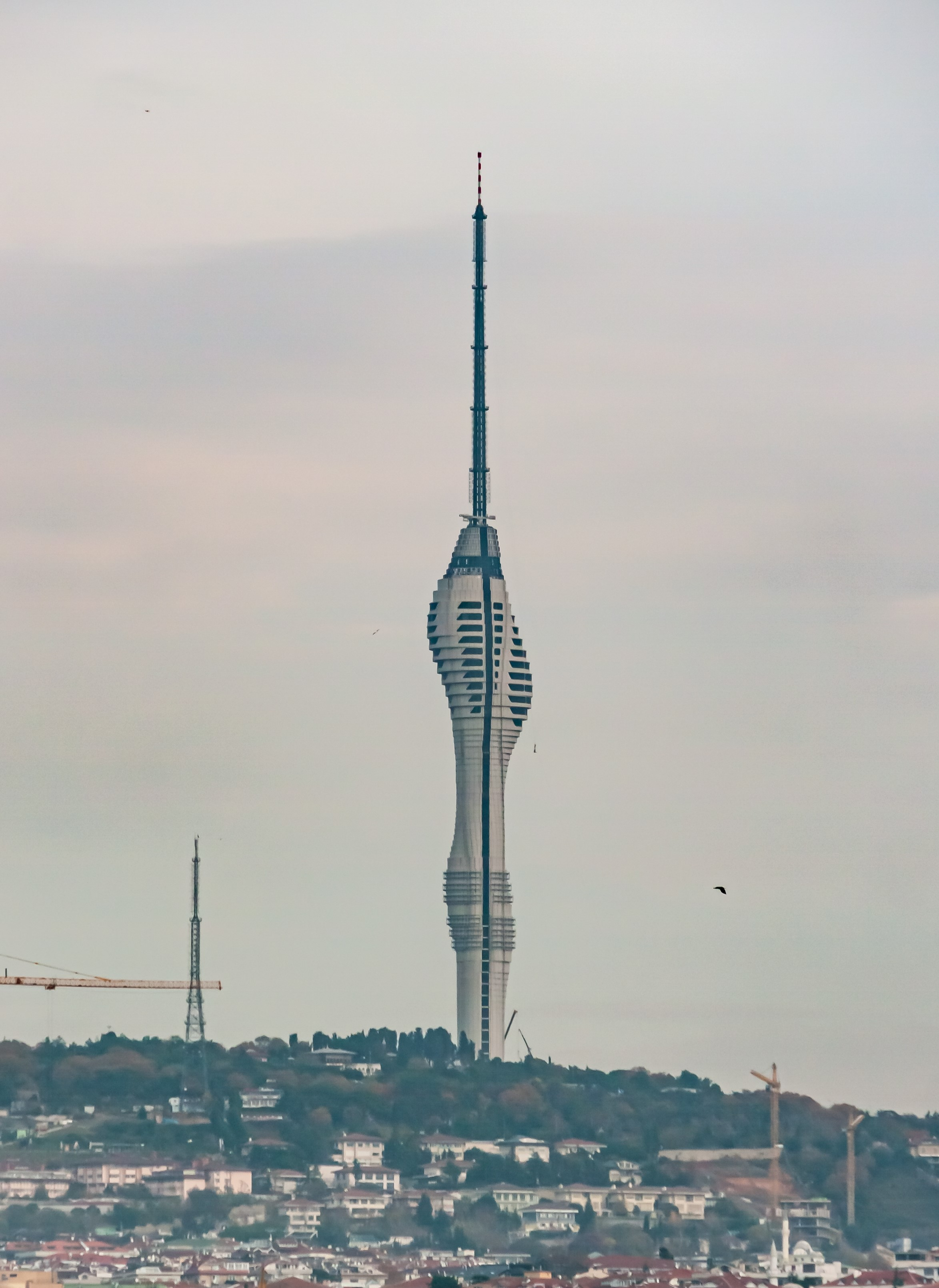
Küçük Çamlıca TV Radio Tower in Istanbul

== Authority ==
The highest authority in radio and television broadcasting is Radio and Television Supreme Council (abbreviated RTÜK). RTÜK is responsible in both the content of the programs and the technical infrastructure of the broadcasting.

== Radio ==
According to Milliyet newspaper total number of radio stations in Turkey is 1078 (2010 figure). The main broadcaster is Turkish Radio and Television Corporation (abbreviated TRT), a public broadcaster. TRT broadcasts 7 national, 6 regional and 5 international radio channels. TRT uses medium wave and FM band for the domestic broadcast. The short wave is reserved for international services (Voice of Turkey). The private companies however prefer FM band. The method of sterephony is zenith tone system.

== Television ==
According to a report by RTÜK, there are 63 nationwide, 113 regional, and 1129 local broadcasters. Turkey uses CCIR System B in VHF Band and CCIR System G in UHF Band. The color information is superimposed by PAL method. TRT uses both the VHF and UHF Bands. VHF is reserved for TRT 1 and UHF for the others. The private broadcasters use UHF band. According to the regulation a channel difference of at least 3 channels (21 MHz in VHF and 24 MHz in UHF) is required in each region. Thus in certain high population-density areas some broadcasters face the problem of shortage in channel availability. The stereophonic sound in analogue transmission is coded by Zweikanalton method.

== DBS ==
TRT has 14 nationwide channels. While the basic transmission is carried on by the Transmitter stations, most are broadcast by satellite. All nationwide private broadcasters as well as a few regional broadcasters also use satellite broadcasting. The Türksat company distributes the satellite channels by cable. The direct broadcast is provided by two companies: Digitürk and D-Smart. Some of their channels are in HDTV format.

== See also ==
- Timeline of broadcast in Turkey
