= Türksat 5A =

Turkish communications satellite

- Türksat 5A satellite
- Mission type: Communications
- Operator: Türksat A.Ş.
- COSPAR ID: 2021-001A
- SATCAT no.: 47306
- Mission duration: 15 years (planned); 5 years, 8 months, 26 days, 23 hours and 3 minutes (elapsed)

Spacecraft properties
- Bus: Eurostar E3000EOR
- Manufacturer: Airbus Defence and Space
- Launch mass: 3,500 kg (7,700 lb)
- Power: 12 kW

Start of mission
- Launch date: 8 January 2021, 02:15:00 UTC
- Rocket: Falcon-9 v1.2 (Block 5)
- Launch site: Cape Canaveral, SLC-40
- Contractor: SpaceX

Orbital parameters
- Reference system: Geocentric orbit
- Regime: Geostationary orbit
- Longitude: 31° East

Transponders
- Band: 42 K_{u}-band
- Coverage area: Western Eurasia and Africa

Türksat 5A, is a Turkish communications satellite, operated by Türksat A.Ş. for commercial and military purposes.

== History ==
According to an agreement signed in September 2011, the satellite was developed by specialists in cooperation with Türksat and Turkish Aerospace Industries (TAI). It was produced in Turkey by Turkish Aerospace Industries (TAI) at its newly established Satellite Assembly Integration and Test Facility (Turkish: Uydu Montaj Entegrasyon ve Test) (UMET) in Ankara with 20% indigenously developed technology. Türksat 5A is the first geostationary communications satellite built in Turkey.

It was reported in early 2013 that Mitsubishi Electric (MELCO) of Japan, which is constructing the satellite platforms of Türksat 4A and Türksat 4B, might join the project to provide a MELCO DS2000 satellite bus for the satellite. But on 9 November 2017, Airbus Defence and Space was selected to construct the satellite platforms for Türksat 5A using Eurostar E3000EOR, an all-electric variant of Eurostar E3000.

== Launch ==
The spacecraft was launched on 8 January 2021 at 02:15:00 UTC from Cape Canaveral (CCSFS), SLC-40. Türksat 5A will be placed in a geosynchronous orbit at 31° East to provide telecommunication and direct TV broadcasting services over a broad geographic region between west of China and east of England stretching over Turkey, as well as Europe, Central Asia, the Middle East and Africa.

It has a launch mass of 3,500 kg (7,700 lb) carrying 42 K_{u}-band transponders. The expected on-orbit life time will be 15 years, but the more efficient electric thrusters will allow Turksat 5A to maintain its position in orbit for more than 30 years, double the life span of many large communications satellites, according to Airbus.

== Controversy ==
On 29 October 2020, Armenian protesters gathered outside of the Hawthorne, California headquarters of the TurkSat 5A launch provider SpaceX to protest the satellite's launch, demanding SpaceX not launch the satellite, claiming that it will be used against military and civilian targets in the disputed Nagorno-Karabakh region. SpaceX did not respond to a request for comment on the protests.

TurkSat 5A would greatly extend the range of drone operations from the west of Europe to the east of Kazakhstan, with more resistance against jamming, rejection and wiretapping; high-definition live streams of targets and commanding of munitions drops.

== See also ==
- Türksat (company)
- Turkish Aerospace Industries
- Türksat (satellite)
