= Türksat 4B =

Turkish communications satellite

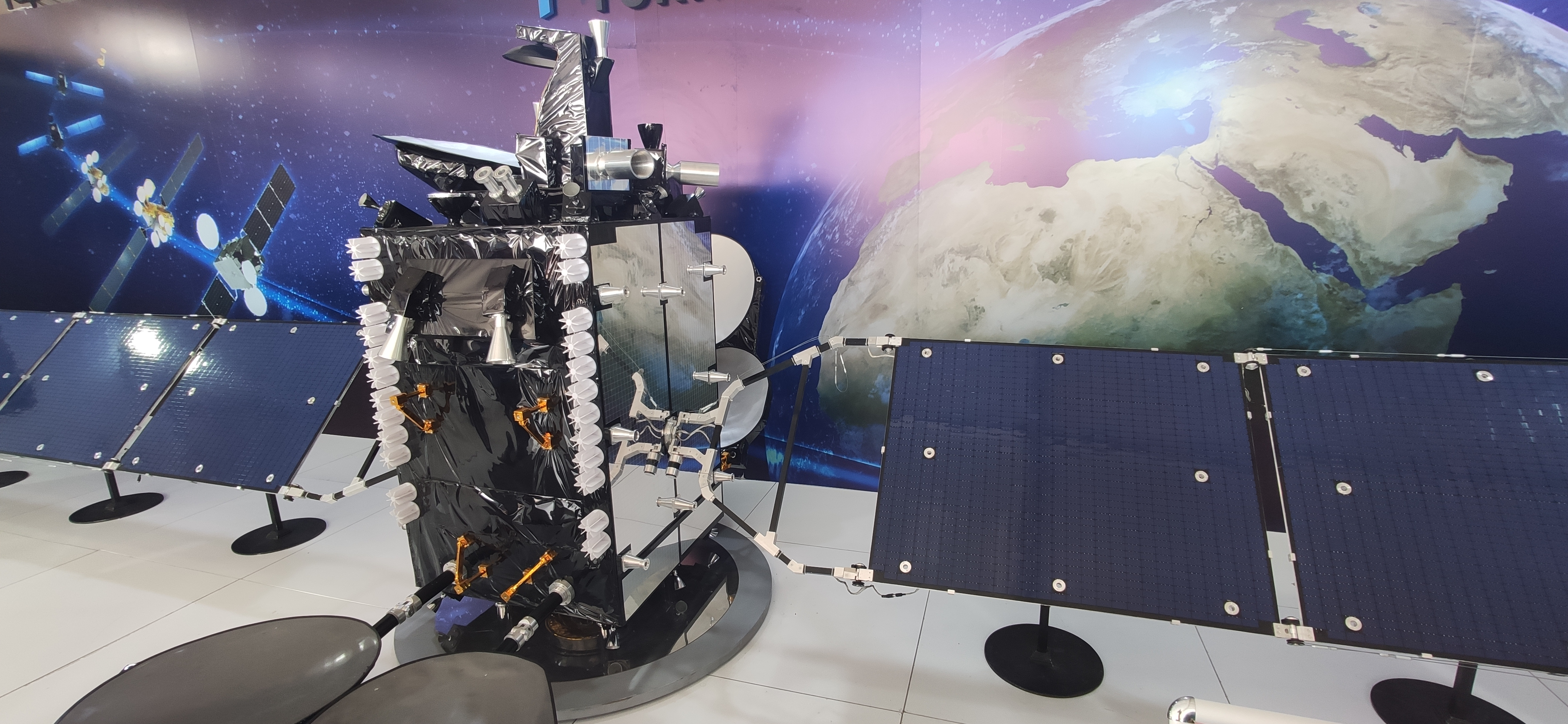
- Mission type: Communication
- Operator: Türksat
- COSPAR ID: 2015-060A
- SATCAT no.: 40984
- Mission duration: 15 years

Spacecraft properties
- Bus: MELCO DS2000
- Manufacturer: MELCO
- Launch mass: 4,924 kg (10,856 lb)

Start of mission
- Launch date: October 16, 2015, 20:40:00 UTC
- Rocket: Proton-M/Briz-M
- Launch site: Baikonur Cosmodrome Pad 39, Kazakhstan
- Contractor: ILS

Orbital parameters
- Reference system: Geocentric
- Regime: Geostationary
- Longitude: 50° East

Türksat 4B is a Turkish communications satellite, operated by Türksat.

== Overview ==
According to the in-orbit delivery contract signed in early 2011, Mitsubishi Electric (MELCO) of Japan was in charge of the construction of the satellite's base MELCO DS2000, and the American-Russian joint-venture company International Launch Services (ILS) provided the launch of the spacecraft atop a Russian Proton-M space launch vehicle from Baikonur Cosmodrome in Kazakhstan scheduled in late 2014. In the scope of the contract, Turkish engineers collaborated in the production of the satellite. The production of Türksat 4B at the Mitsubishi Electric Facility in Kamakura was completed in June 2014.

Türksat 4B is part of the Turksat series of satellites, and is placed in geosynchronous orbit at 50°E to provide telecommunication and direct TV broadcasting services over a wide geographic region between west of China and east of England spanning Turkey, as well as Europe, Central Asia, the Middle East and Africa.

Türksat 4B has a mass of approximately 4,924 kg (10,856 lb) and an expected on-orbit life time of 15 years.

Türksat 4A and Türksat 4B are projected to enable a capacity increase because the satellites currently in service, namely Türksat 2A and Türksat 3A, are at 90% occupied.

== Control of UAV's by SATCOM ==
The Turkish Armed Forces has dedicated channels on the Turksat 4B for use in guidance of it SATCOM equipped Anka-S UCAV systems.

== Launch ==
The spacecraft was launched by the American-Russian joint-venture company International Launch Services (ILS) atop a Russian Proton-M space launch vehicle on October 16, 2015, at 20:40:00 from Baikonur Cosmodrome Pad 39 in Kazakhstan.

After successfully completing the testing process, the satellite was placed on its final orbit on October 24, 2015.

== Features ==
Türksat 4B provides expansion of K_{a} band's 3-Gbps data transfer capacity at spot coverage areas through its 1,800 MHz bandwidth in total. A total of 792 MHz communication capacity is secured by 18 transponders of the K_{u} band.

== See also ==
- Turksat (satellite)
