= TAI Keklik =

Turkish target drone

General information
- Type: Unmanned drone tracking target drone
- Manufacturer: Turkish Aerospace Industries (TAI)
- Status: In use
- Primary user: Turkish Armed Forces

History
- Introduction date: November 2001
- First flight: 1997

TAI Keklik is a radio-controlled tracking target drone introduced in 2001. Designed, developed and built by Turkish Aerospace Industries (TAI), the unmanned aerial vehicle (UAV) is in use by the Turkish Armed Forces for target tracking in non-firing gunnery exercises.

Keklik is the Turkish word for "partridge". TAI produces other UAVs named after birds.

== Overview ==
The Research and Development Department of the Turkish Ministry of National Defence awarded a contract to TAI in August 1995 for the development of a low-cost training target drone for use by the Turkish Army and Navy in target tracking and non-firing gunnery exercises with anti-aircraft guns; and with radar-guided and heat-seeking anti-aircraft missiles. It was also intended for training the operators of the much larger TAI Turna target drone.

== Development ==
The Keklik prototype was completed in July 1997, and it went in production in late 1999. Since November 2001, the Keklik has been in the inventory of the Turkish Air Force and Turkish Army.

The Keklik is propelled by an OS-MAX 91 FX two-stroke engine developing 2.09 kW (2.80 hp), produced by German company Graupner GmbH. The delta-winged, robust and simple UAV takes off from a manually operated bungee catapult, and is recovered by a remotely controlled parachute on land or sea. The drone can be re-launched in 15 minutes. The tractor type aircraft is made of composite material and painted in bright colors for easy visibility.

== Specifications ==
Data from TUSAŞ Türk Havacılık ve Uzaay Sanayii A.Ş.-Network 54

General characteristics

- Crew: 0
- Length: 1.36 m (4 ft 6 in)
- Wingspan: 1.61 m (5 ft 3 in)
- Height: 0.32 m (1 ft 1 in)
- Wing area: 1.05 m^{2} (11.3 sq ft)
- Empty weight: 7 kg (15 lb)
- Max takeoff weight: 10 kg (22 lb)
- Powerplant: 1 × Graupner OS-MAX 91 Fx 2.09 kW two-stroke engine

Performance

- Maximum speed: 150 km/h (93 mph, 81 kn)
- Stall speed: 50 km/h (31 mph, 27 kn)
- Endurance: 30 min
