= TAI Pelikan =

Turkish unmanned aerial vehicle

General information
- Type: Unmanned drone reconnaissance, surveillance, target acquisition
- Manufacturer: Turkish Aerospace Industries (TAI)
- Status: Only prototypes are produced, program ended.

History
- First flight: 15 December 2003

TAI Pelikan, a.k.a. IHA-X2, is a radio-controlled reconnaissance, surveillance and target acquisition drone. Designed, developed and built by Turkish Aerospace Industries (TAI), the unmanned aerial vehicle (UAV) is a half scale model of the tactical drone TAI Baykuş air platform. It was produced as a training and bridge platform to the TAI Baykuş.

Pelikan is the Turkish word for species pelican. TAI has some other UAV's named after birds.

== Development ==
The shoulder-winged UAV has all composite material airframe with metal twin tail booms. The drone is propelled by two 2-cylinder 2-stroke gasoline engines of type Zenoah G38 from Japan with 4 x 2.2 hp (1.6 kW) power. There exist two versions of TAI Pelikan related to propeller configuration, a pusher and a tractor aircraft. The drone carries a two-axis gimbaled EO/IR camera, which relays its video in real-time telemetry. Its guidance/tracking takes place fully autonomous based on INS/GPS integrated waypoint navigation system. Take off and landing of the drone is accomplished in conventional way on wheels.

== Specifications ==
Data from RUVSA Russian Unmanned Vehicle Systems Association - TR Defence

General characteristics

- Crew: 0
- Length: 3.00 m (9 ft 10 in)
- Wingspan: 3.60 m (11 ft 10 in)
- Empty weight: 20 kg (44 lb)
- Max takeoff weight: 35 kg (77 lb)
- Powerplant: 2 × Zenoah G38 2-cylinder two-stroke engine

Performance

- Maximum speed: 120 km/h (75 mph, 65 kn)
- Endurance: 6 hr
- Service ceiling: 1,525 m (5,003 ft)
