= TAI Martı =

Turkish unmanned aerial vehicle

General information
- Type: Unmanned drone surveillance
- Manufacturer: Turkish Aerospace Industries (TAI)
- Status: in use

History
- Introduction date: 2003

TAI Martı is a radio-controlled surveillance unmanned drone designed, developed and built by Turkish Aerospace Industries (TAI) in 2003.

Martı is the Turkish word for "seagull". TAI produces other UAVs named after birds.

== Development ==
The shoulder-winged UAV has all composite material airframe. The drone is propelled by a 2-cylinder 2-stroke gasoline engine of type OS MAX 46 FXi by German company Graupner GmbH with 1.7 hp (1.3 kW) power or Zenoah G38 from Japan with 2.2 hp (1.6 kW) in tractor configuration. The drone carries a two-axis gimbaled EO/IR camera, which relays its video in real-time telemetry. Its guidance/tracking takes place fully autonomous based on INS/GPS integrated waypoint navigation system. Take off of the drone can be accomplished in conventional way on wheels or by catapult and the recovery on wheels or by parachute.

TAI Martı was produced originally for pilot training, and is in service since 2003. The development of aerial-photographic camera as well as studies for digital image analysis and retrieval were carried out in cooperation with Scientific and Technological Research Council of Turkey (TÜBİTAK). In 2004, TAI Martı successfully completed the testing in aerial image retrieval and shootings in Mersin that led to replacement of older retrieval system with balloons.

== Specifications ==
Data from TR Defence

General characteristics

- Crew: 0
- Length: 1.20 m (3 ft 11 in)
- Wingspan: 2.00 m (6 ft 7 in)
- Empty weight: 9 kg (20 lb)
- Max takeoff weight: 12 kg (26 lb)
- Powerplant: 1 × OS MAX 46 FXi or Zenoah G38 2-cylinder two-stroke engine

Performance

- Maximum speed: 100 km/h (62 mph, 54 kn)
- Endurance: 1 hr
- Service ceiling: 900 m (3,000 ft)
