= Türksat 5B =

Turkish communications satellite

- Mission type: Communications
- Operator: Türksat A.Ş.
- COSPAR ID: 2021-126A
- SATCAT no.: 50212
- Mission duration: 15 years (planned); 4 years, 9 months and 15 days (in progress)

Spacecraft properties
- Spacecraft: Türksat 5B
- Spacecraft type: Eurostar
- Bus: Eurostar-3000EOR
- Manufacturer: Airbus Defence and Space
- Launch mass: 4,500 kg (9,900 lb)
- Power: 15 kW

Start of mission
- Launch date: 19 December 2021, 03:58:39 UTC
- Rocket: Falcon 9 B1067-3
- Launch site: Cape Canaveral, SLC 40
- Contractor: SpaceX

Orbital parameters
- Reference system: Geocentric orbit
- Regime: Geostationary orbit
- Longitude: 42° East

Transponders
- Band: 50 Gbps Ku-band, Ka-band and X-band (high-throughput)
- Coverage area: Turkey, Middle East, Europe, Africa

Türksat 5B is a Turkish geostationary high-throughput (HTS) communications satellite of Türksat A.Ş. developed for military and commercial purposes.

== Development ==
The Türksat 5B project started in September 2011. The final production contract for the Turkish Aerospace Industries (TAI) was planned for 2015. After a delay, the contract was realized in October 2017 when Airbus Defence and Space was selected to join the project with the requirement that 25% of the satellite be built in Turkey in order to stimulate the technological sector of the Turkish economy.

In November 2020, it was announced that satellite level tests for Türksat 5B have begun.

== Launch ==
The satellite was launched with a Falcon 9 launch vehicle of SpaceX at Cape Canaveral, Florida, on 19 December 2021 at 03:58:39 UTC. The first-stage booster used on this mission was B1067, making its third flight; the first stage was successfully recovered on A Shortfall of Gravitas.

== Spacecraft ==
Türksat 5B is a communications satellite to serve on a geostationary orbit at 42° East longitude. It was built on a Eurostar-3000EOR satellite bus manufactured by Airbus Defence and Space. It has a mass of 4,500 kg (9,900 lb) and an expected design lifetime of 15 years, maneuver lifetime of more than 35 years. Powered by two deployable solar panels and batteries at 15 kW, the 50 Gbps high-throughput satellite consists of Ku-band, Ka-band and X-band transponders.

The 3 military X-band transponders have global coverage and were developed by Aselsan for use by the Turkish Presidency of Defense Industries (SSB/SSM).

== See also ==
- Türksat 5A
