= Türksat 6A =

Turkish communications satellite

- Mission type: Communications
- Operator: Türksat A.Ş.
- COSPAR ID: 2024-127A
- SATCAT no.: 60233
- Mission duration: 15 years (planned)

Spacecraft properties
- Manufacturer: TÜBİTAK Uzay, TAI, ASELSAN, CTech Bilişim Teknolojileri A.Ş.
- Power: 12 kW

Start of mission
- Launch date: 8 July 2024
- Rocket: Falcon 9 Block 5
- Launch site: Cape Canaveral SLC-40
- Contractor: SpaceX

Orbital parameters
- Reference system: Geocentric orbit
- Regime: Geostationary orbit
- Longitude: 42° East

Transponders
- Band: 16 K_{u}-band (plus 4 in reserve); 2 X-band (plus 1 in reserve)
- Bandwidth: 7.30-18.10 GHz uplink 11.70-12.75 GHz downlink
- Coverage area: Turkey, Middle East, Europe and Africa

Türksat 6A is Turkey's first fully domestically produced communications satellite, successfully launched on July 8, 2024.

== History ==
According to an agreement signed on 15 December 2014, the satellite will be developed and manufactured indigenously by specialists under the leadership of TÜBİTAK Space Technologies Research Institute (TÜBİTAK Uzay) in cooperation with Turkish Aerospace Industries (TAI), ASELSAN and CTech Bilişim Teknolojileri A.Ş. TAI will be in charge of design and production of the satellite structure and the subsystems such as spacecraft thermal control, chemical propulsion, harness and mechanical ground equipment needed to support the mission. TAI and TÜBİTAK Uzay will cooperate for the development of the software for satellite on-board data handling as well as for satellite command and control. They will perform the assembly, integration and test activities together at the TAI's Satellite Assembly Integration and Test Facility (Turkish: Uydu Montaj Entegrasyon ve Test) (UMET) in Akıncı, Ankara. Türksat 6A will also have X-band satellite communication capability for use by the Turkish Armed Forces.

The satellite was launched on a SpaceX Falcon 9 launch vehicle. It is positioned in geosynchronous orbit positioned at 42° East with an expected on-orbit life time of at least 15 years. It consist of 16 Ku-band transponders, additionally 4 in reserve as well as two active and one in reserve X-band transponders. The Ku-band transponders will have a bandwidth of 7.3-18.1 GHz for uplink and 11.7-12.75 GHz downlink bandwidth. Each of the Ku-band transponders will have a minimum power of 140 watts and the X-band transponders a minimum power of 150 watts each.

While the X-band transponders will cover the territory of Turkey only, the K_{u}-band transponders of Türksat 6A will have three coverage zones:

- Turkey
- "West Zone" covering the British Isles in the west, Scandinavian countries in the north, North Africa in the south, Caspian Sea in the east,
- "East Zone" covering Anatolia in the west, Russian Federation in the north, Saudi Arabia and Pakistan in the south, China national boundary in the east.

The project is estimated to have cost around US$250 million and involved more than 100 ASELSAN personnel, utilizing over 80 space electronic units.
