= Alpaero Exel =

Exel

General information
- Type: Motor glider
- National origin: France
- Manufacturer: ALPAERO Noin Aéronautique, Châteauvieux
- Designer: Claude Noin
- Number built: 9 kits delivered by end 2005 plus prototype

History
- First flight: September 1998

The Alpaero Exel is a French single seat, single engine pusher pod-and-boom kit-built ultralight motor glider. About 10 had been produced by 2005.

== Design and development ==
The Exel was designed to be sold complete or as a rapid-assembly kit. It is a single seat motor glider with a single engine in pusher configuration mounted high behind the cockpit. A T-tail is carried on a low set boom that extends the bottom line of the nose and cockpit pod.

The mid-mounted wings have carbon fibre spar caps and are glass fibre skinned. For most of the span the wings have constant chord, but the final 30% is straight tapered on both edges, with winglets an option. The aspect ratio is 16.5. Flaperons extend from the wing root just into the trapezoidal tip; flap deflections are +5°, 0° and -5°. Upper surface air brakes are placed at mid chord, halfway along the parallel wing region.

The fuselage is formed from two glass fibre half-shells and plywood bulkheads. The pod ends at the trailing edge of the wing; forward, the single piece canopy produces an almost linear profile to the nose. Fin and rudder, the latter fabric covered, are straight edged and slightly tapered, carrying a parallel edged, high aspect ratio tailplane with a single piece elevator. The Exel has a single main landing wheel mounted within an integral fuselage fairing, assisted by a tail wheel mounted in the base of the rudder. A pair of small outboard wheels protect the wingtips.

The standard Exel is powered by an 18 hp (13.4 kW) JPX D-320 flat twin, two-stroke engine, driving a two bladed pusher carbon fibre propeller which can be folded so both blades point aft for gliding flight. Optionally, a 21 kW (28 hp) Hirth F-33 single cylinder two stroke engine, a four-stroke Briggs & Stratton 21 kW (28 hp) or a Zenoah G-25 16 kW (21 hp) single cylinder two stroke powerplant may be fitted. A ballistic recovery parachute is another option.

== Operational history ==
The prototype flew in September 1998 and production started the following year. By the end of 2005, 9 Exels had been delivered.

== Specifications (JPX powered) ==
Data from Jane's All the World's Aircraft 2010/11, p.193

General characteristics

- Crew: 1
- Length: 5.90 m (19 ft 4 in)
- Wingspan: 13.74 m (45 ft 1 in)
- Wing area: 11.62 m^{2} (125.1 sq ft)
- Empty weight: 196 kg (432 lb)
- Max takeoff weight: 310 kg (683 lb)
- Powerplant: 1 × JPX D-320 flat twin, two stroke with 2.38:1 reduction gearing, 13.4 kW (18.0 hp)
- Propellers: 2-bladed carbon fibre, folds rearwards with blades parallel for unpowered flight, 1.28 m (4 ft 2 in) diameter

Performance

- Cruise speed: 120 km/h (75 mph, 65 kn) at 75% power
- Stall speed: 63 km/h (39 mph, 34 kn)
- Never exceed speed: 179 km/h (111 mph, 97 kn)
- Endurance: 3 hr
- g limits: +4.4/-2.2
- Rate of climb: 2 m/s (390 ft/min) at sea level
- Rate of sink: 0.75 m/s (148 ft/min) minimum
- Lift-to-drag: 30:1
