= TAI Baykuş =

Turkish unmanned aerial vehicle

General information
- Type: Reconnaissance, surveillance, target acquisition UAV
- Manufacturer: Turkish Aerospace Industries (TAI)

TAI Baykuş is a radio-controlled tactical unmanned aerial vehicle designed, developed and built by Turkish Aerospace Industries (TAI) between 2003 and 2004.

Baykuş is the Turkish word for "owl". TAI produces other UAVs named after birds.

== Development ==
The UAV was developed based on the experience gained by its half-sized model TAI Pelikan.

The shoulder-winged UAV has all composite material airframe with metal twin tail booms. The drone is propelled by two 2-cylinder 2-stroke gasoline engines of type JPX DC320 from France with 2 x 20 hp (15 kW) power. There exist two versions of TAI Baykuş related to propeller configuration, a pusher and a tractor aircraft.

The drone carries a two-axis gimbaled EO/IR camera, which relays its video in real-time telemetry. Its guidance/tracking takes place fully autonomous based on INS/GPS integrated waypoint navigation system. Take off and landing of the drone is accomplished in conventional way on wheels.

== Specifications ==
Data from TR Defence

General characteristics

- Crew: 0
- Length: 6 m (19 ft 8 in)
- Wingspan: 7 m (23 ft 0 in)
- Empty weight: 100 kg (220 lb)
- Max takeoff weight: 250 kg (551 lb)
- Powerplant: 2 × JPX DC320 2-cylinder two-stroke engine

Performance

- Maximum speed: 200 km/h (120 mph, 110 kn)
- Endurance: 12 hr
- Service ceiling: 4,600 m (15,100 ft)

== See also ==
- Bayraktar Mini UAV
- Bayraktar TB2
- Bayraktar Akıncı
- Bayraktar Tactical UAS
- TAI Anka
- TAI Aksungur
