= Türksat 1C =

Decommissioned Turkish communications satellite

- Mission type: Communication
- Operator: Türksat
- COSPAR ID: 1996-040B
- SATCAT no.: 23949
- Mission duration: 14 years

Spacecraft properties
- Bus: Spacebus 2000
- Manufacturer: Aérospatiale
- Launch mass: 1,062 kg (2,341 lb)
- Power: 2,800 watts

Start of mission
- Launch date: July 9, 1996
- Rocket: Ariane 44L H10-3
- Launch site: Kourou ELA-2

End of mission
- Deactivated: October 3, 2010

Orbital parameters
- Reference system: Geocentric
- Regime: Geostationary
- Longitude: 31.3°E
- Perigee altitude: 35,802.6 kilometres (22,246.7 mi)
- Apogee altitude: 35,835.7 kilometres (22,267.3 mi)
- Period: 1,437.4 minutes

Transponders
- Band: 16 K_{u} band + 8 backup
- Bandwidth: 9×36 MHz; 2×54 megahertz 5×72 megahertz
- EIRP: 53 dBW west spot: Europa & Turkey; 53 decibel-watts east spot: Asia & Turkey

Türksat 1C was a Turkish communications satellite as part of a project to form an instant network with two geosynchronous satellites that is supervised by the companies Türksat A.Ş. in Turkey and Aérospatiale of France.

Türksat 1C was launched by Arianespace atop an Ariane-44L H10-3 launch vehicle along with Saudi Arabian satellite Arabsat-2A in a dual-payload launch on July 9, 1996, from ELA-2 at the Guiana Space Centre in Kourou, French Guiana. It was built under the insurance terms of the turnkey system contract to replace the first Turkish satellite Türksat 1A, which was lost following a launch failure on January 24, 1994. The contract was modified so that the coverage area of Türksat 1C was enlarged by two big zones.

Turksat 1C was successfully placed into geostationary transfer orbit and positioned at 31.3°E on July 10, 1996. Completing the orbital tests, the satellite shifted to longitude 42°E. After this process, which took 17 days, the broadcast traffic of the Türksat 1B was transferred to Türksat 1C. Finally, when these processes completed Türksat 1B was positioned at 31.3°E following similar orbital manoeuvres.

Turksat 1C was designed for covering Turkey and Europe on west spot by vertical emission and Turkey and Central Asia on east spot by horizontal emission so as to serve simultaneously between Europe, Turkey and Central Asia, and to provide direct connection between Europe and Central Asia. It is based on the Aerospatiale Spacebus 2000 series having an on-orbit mass of 1,062 kg (2,341 lb). The communications payload consists of 16 K_{u} band transponders with eight backup, nine with 36Mhz, two with 54Mhz and five 72Mhz bandwidth.

On July 16, 2008, all traffic on Turksat 1C was transferred to Turksat 3A, which was launched on June 13, 2008 and its television broadcast was terminated on October 3, 2010.

== See also ==
- Turksat (satellite)
