= JPX D-320 =

Family of French ultralight aircraft engines

- Type: Two-cylinder two-stroke engine
- National origin: France
- Manufacturer: JPX
- Manufactured: until 2012

The JPX D-320 and D330 are a family of French twin-cylinder, horizontally opposed, two-stroke aircraft engines.

The engine was introduced specifically for the powered paraglider market, as part of the company's comeback efforts following going out of business in the early 1990s. Production of the engine had ended by 2012.

== Design and development ==
The engine has two cylinders in a horizontally opposed configuration, with cooling fins on the cylinders. The single ignition system uses capacitor discharge ignition. Fuel is metered by a single Tillotson carburetor. Starting is only by electric start, without recoil start as an option.

The D-320 has a redline rpm of 6600 and uses a belt reduction drive of 2.38:1. Its weight of just 36 lb (16 kg) gives the engine a high power-to-weight ratio.

== Variants ==
D-320
Twin-cylinder, horizontally opposed aircraft engine introduced in the mid-1990s and currently out of production. Power output is 20 hp (15 kW) at 6600 rpm.
D330
Twin-cylinder, horizontally opposed aircraft engine, improved variant, currently in production. Power output is 20 hp (15 kW) at 6500 rpm.

== Applications ==
- Alpaero Exel
- Alpaero Sirius
- Bailey JPX D330
- D'Yves Yvasion 2000
- Ekolot JK 01A Elf
- Reflex J 320
- TAI Baykuş
- Technic'air Fly Roller

== Specifications (D330) ==
Data from JPX

=== General characteristics ===
- Type: twin-cylinder, two-stroke engine
- Displacement: 319 cc (19.47 cu inches)
- Dry weight: 15.5 kg (34 lb) complete with standard reduction drive, carburettor, air filter, electronic ignition, starter motor and exhaust system.

=== Components ===
- Valvetrain: 6-blade reed valve induction
- Fuel system: Tillotson carburetor
- Oil system: premixed 2.5% oil and fuel
- Cooling system: air cooled

=== Performance ===
- Power output: 20 hp (15 kW) at 6500 rpm
- Compression ratio: 8.5:1
- Fuel consumption: 2.5 litres to 6 litres per hour depending on load and cruising speed

== See also ==
- Kawasaki 440
- Rotax 277
- Hirth F-263
- Hirth F-33
