= Türksat 1A =

Turkish communications satellite

- Mission type: Communications
- Operator: Türksat
- Mission duration: 10 years planned Failed to orbit

Spacecraft properties
- Bus: Spacebus-2000
- Manufacturer: Aérospatiale
- Launch mass: 1,743 kilograms (3,843 lb)

Start of mission
- Launch date: 24 January 1994, 21:37:00 UTC
- Rocket: Ariane 44LP
- Launch site: Kourou ELA-2
- Contractor: Arianespace

Orbital parameters
- Reference system: Geocentric
- Regime: Geostationary
- Epoch: Planned

Türksat 1A was a Turkish communications satellite as part of a project to form an instant network with two geosynchronous satellites that is supervised by the companies Türksat A.Ş. in Turkey and Aérospatiale of France.

Turkey's first spacecraft in its space program, Türksat 1A was launched by Arianespace atop an Ariane-44LP H10+ launch vehicle, along with the French satellite Eutelsat 2F5, in a dual-payload launch on January 24, 1994, at 21:37:00 UTC from ELA-2 at the Guiana Space Centre in Kourou, French Guiana. It failed to reach the orbit as it was lost by falling into ocean due to malfunction of the launch vehicle's last stage 12 minutes and 12 seconds after lift-off.

After successful launching of Türksat 1B the same year, Türksat 1A's mission was replaced by Türksat 1C, which was placed into orbit in 1996.

== See also ==
- Turksat (satellite)
