= Revue Aerospatiale =

Revue aerospatiale
- Categories: Aerospace
- Frequency: Monthly
- Publisher: Aerospatiale
- Founded: 1970
- Final issue: 2000
- Country: France
- Language: English, French
- ISSN: 0994-9003

Revue aerospatiale was a monthly magazine published by the French aerospace company Aerospatiale.

== History ==
Aerospatiale created the magazine Aerospatiale in January 1970 as part of its public relations effort. The publication was a monthly and was published by PEMA-2B. 128 issues were published through 1983. At that point, the magazine was restructured with the addition of professional journalists, became bilingual (English and French), and was renamed Revue aerospatiale. The magazine also covered competing firms, which helped to push circulation to a typical 50,000 copies. Gilles Patri, was the founder and editor-in-chief of Revue aerospatiale for its entire 17-year run.

Publication ceased in 2000, when Revue aerospatiale became part of EADS and the magazine transitioned into Planet Aerospace.

== Special edition ==
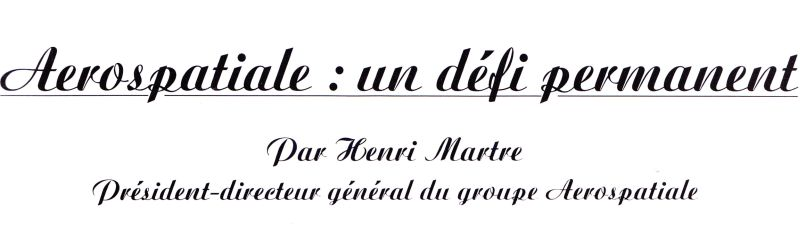
editorial

In March 1990 she published a special edition of 132 pages summarizing its first 20 years of activity from 1970 to 1990. The President Henri Martre signed editorial entitled : Aerospatiale an ongoing challenge. The official company name is clearly written without an accent, and chosen to be as international as possible.
