= Türksat 2A =

Decommissioned Turkish communications satellite

- Mission type: Communication
- Operator: Türksat; Eurasiasat SAM
- COSPAR ID: 2001-002A
- SATCAT no.: 26666
- Mission duration: 15 years

Spacecraft properties
- Bus: Spacebus 3000B3
- Manufacturer: Thales Alenia Space
- Launch mass: 3,530 kilograms (7,780 lb)
- Power: 9,200 watts

Start of mission
- Launch date: January 10, 2001, 21:39 UTC
- Rocket: Ariane 44P H10-3
- Launch site: Kourou ELA-2
- Contractor: Arianespace

End of mission
- Deactivated: September 27, 2016

Orbital parameters
- Reference system: Geocentric
- Regime: Geostationary
- Longitude: 42°E

Transponders
- Band: 34 K_{u} band
- Bandwidth: fixed beam: 22×33 MHz + 10×36 megahertz Steerable beam: 2
- EIRP: 50 dBW

Türksat 2A, a.k.a. Eurasiasat 1, was a Turkish communications satellite as part of a project to form an instant network with two geosynchronous satellites that are supervised by the companies Türksat A.Ş. in Turkey and Eurasiasat SAM in Monaco.

Türksat 2A was launched by Arianespace atop an Ariane-44P H10-3 launch vehicle on January 10, 2001, at 21:39 UTC from ELA-2 at the Guiana Space Centre in Kourou, French Guiana. The spacecraft was successfully placed into geostationary transfer orbit and then shifted to 42°E position, co-locating with Türksat 1C, which was launched in 1996. Its broadcast traffic entered service on February 1, 2001.

Turksat 2A was designed for covering Europe, Turkey on west spot and Turkey and Central Asia including Middle East and Russia on east spot so as to serve simultaneously within that region, and to provide direct connection between Europe and Central Asia. It is based on the Alcatel Spacebus 3000B3 series having an on-orbit mass of 3,530 kg (7,780 lb) with 9,200 W power. The communications payload consists of 36 K_{u} band transponders consisting of 22 pieces of 33 MHz fixed beam transponders and 10 transponders of 36 MHz bandwidth with two additional steerable beams.

== See also ==
- Türksat (satellite)
