= Turkish Space Systems, Integration and Test Center =

Turkish Space Systems, Integration and Test Centre Uzay Sistemleri, Entegrasyon ve Test Merkezi
- Abbreviation: USET
- Purpose: Spacecraft engineering
- Headquarters: Kazan, Ankara, Turkey
- Coordinates: 40.07385°N 32.58484°E
- Main organ: Turkish Ministry of National Defence
- Parent organization: Turkish Aerospace Industries (TAI)

Turkish Space Systems, Integration and Test Centre (Turkish: Uzay Sistemleri, Entegrasyon ve Test Merkezi) (USET) is a spacecraft production and testing facility owned by the Ministry of National Defence and operated by Turkish Aerospace Industries (TAI). It is located in Ankara, Turkey. The facility's official inauguration took place on May 21, 2015, in presence of President Recep Tayyip Erdoğan.

Considered as a critical infrastructure, the centre was established within the framework of the Göktürk-1 project, which started in 2009, for the indigenous realization of satellite assembly, as well as for qualification and acceptance testing from design to launch phase. It was the product of an agreement between the Turkish Ministry of National Defence and the multinational space services company Telespazio in 2010. Situated within TAI's grounds in the Kazan district of Ankara Province, the budgeted cost of the facility is US$100 million.

USET is a technology centre, at which all satellites up to 5,000 kg (11,000 lb) mass can be assembled and tested in simulated space environmental conditions related to the orbit. Two satellites can be produced and tested simultaneously. The centre serves military and civilian institutions.

Development of the Türksat series communication satellites, starting with Türksat 5A, and Göktürk series Earth observation satellites, will be carried out by Turkish engineers at this site.

At the end of November 2014, it was announced that the construction of the facility was completed, and the centre was put into operation. The centre's Class 100,000 clean rooms cover an area of around 3,800 m^{2} (41,000 sq ft). It is capable of the assembly, integration and testing of several satellites of type low Earth orbit (LEO) and geosynchronous orbit (GEO) with a mass up to five tonnes simultaneously. It has a direct connection to the airbase so that a transport by land becomes needless, offering advantages of security, economy and risk management.

The centre has the following capabilities:

- thermal vacuum tests,
- EMI/EMC tests,
- compact antenna measurement range (CATR) tests,
- solar array deployment tests,
- vibration tests,
- mass properties measurement,
- acoustic tests, and
- MLI preparation.

The advanced integration and environmental tests of Göktürk-1 is the first project to be carried out in the centre. After completion, the satellite will be sent to the launch site by TUSAŞ.
