= CTech =

Turkish communication technology company

CTech Information Technologies Industry and Trade Inc. (Turkish: Ctech Bilişim Teknolojileri Sanayi ve Ticaret A.Ş.), a subsidiary of Turkish Aerospace Industries (TUSAŞ), is a Turkish company for satellite and line-of-sight communication technologies. It specializes in products for the communication needs of unmanned aerial, land and sea vehicles.

== History ==
Ctech was founded in Istanbul, Turkey on 21 January 2005. It became a subsidiary of Turkish Aerospace Industries (TUSAŞ) in 2018.

Operating with over 250 employees at a 4,500 m^{2} (48,000 sq ft) production and engineering infrastructure, and a global logistics service network, CTech maintains its headquarters at Teknopark Istanbul, while its [[Ankara]9 office is located on the Bilkent Cyberpark campus.
