= TAI Turna =

Turkish target drone

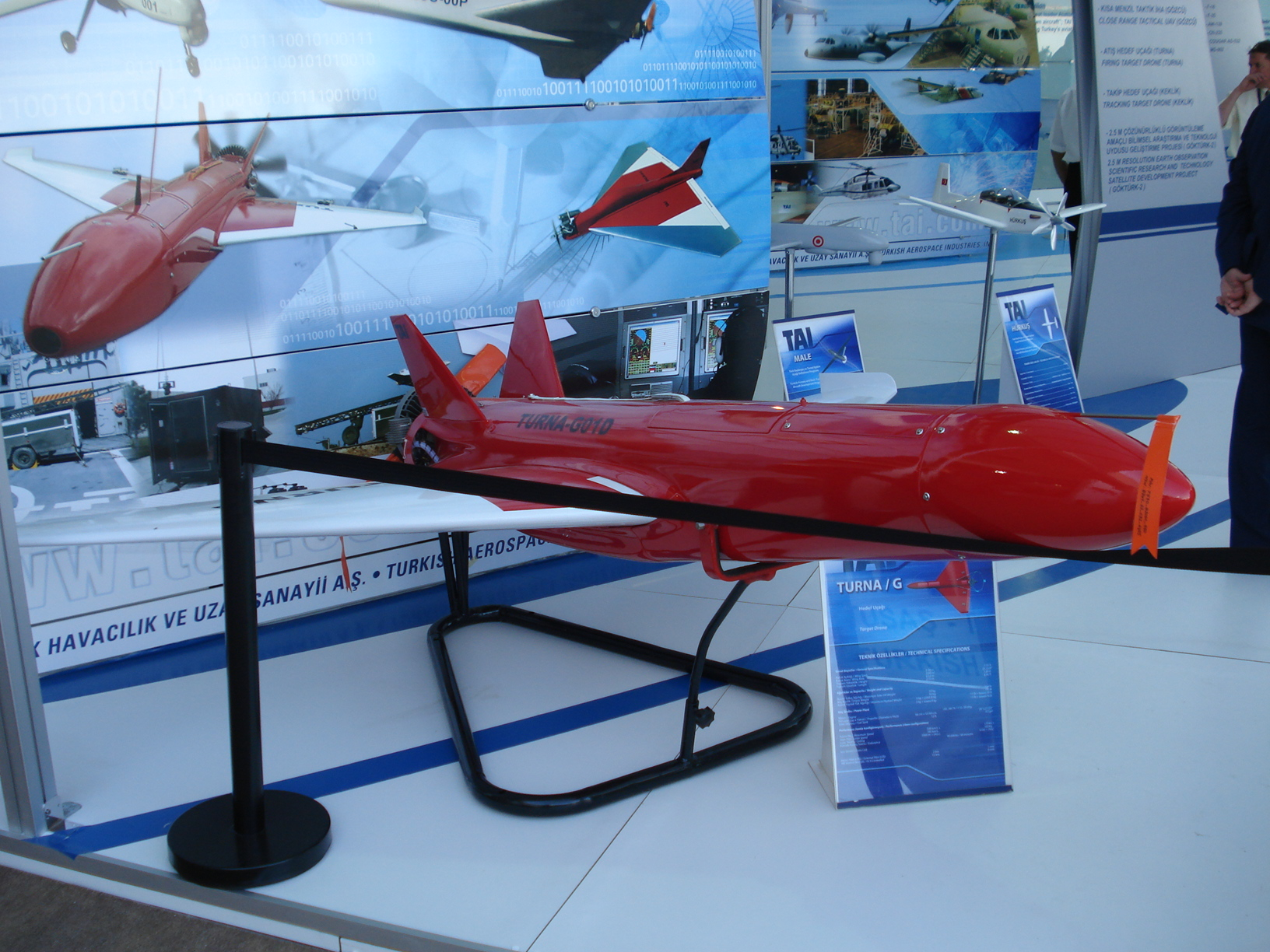
- TAI Turna/G on display in 2007

General information
- Type: Unmanned drone target drone
- Manufacturer: Turkish Aerospace Industries (TAI)
- Status: Not In Production
- Primary user: Turkish Armed Forces

History
- Introduction date: 2001
- First flight: September 1996

TAI Turna is a turboprop-powered radio-controlled target drone introduced in 2001. Designed, developed and built by Turkish Aerospace Industries (TAI) and powered by an engine manufactured by Tusaş Engine Industries (TEI), the unmanned aerial vehicle (UAV) is in use by the Turkish Armed Forces in target tracking and gunnery firing exercises.

Turna is the Turkish word for species crane. TAI has some other UAV's named after birds.

== Overview ==
The Research and Development Department of the Turkish Ministry of National Defence awarded a contract to the TAI in August 1995 for the development of a drone for use by Turkish Air Force and Army in target tracking and gunnery firing exercises. The initial version, named as Turna/S, was first launched in September 1996. Testing of the prototype completed in 1997. Following trials by Turkish Army and Navy ended in 1998.

TAI Turna is used for training with Rapier and Stinger surface-to-air missiles, as well as anti-aircraft guns from 7.62 mm to 76 mm caliber. Firing takes place at a towed sleeve or banner, or even directly at the drone.

== Development ==
Between 2001 and 2003, new versions of Turna/S was developed with designations Turna-101A, -111B and -201C, featuring roll-damping avionics, aerodynamic packages, improved stability and greater reliability.

Based on experience gained by launches from frigates and sorties in bad weather conditions, a new generation was evaluated under the name Tuna/G. Intermediate versions such as Turna-303C, -401C, -411C-501D and-502D served for improvements to autonomy, reliability, aerodynamics, lateral and directional stability as well as available volume for modular payloads. In order to offer alternative configurations, different components such as servos, propeller and engine were also integrated and tested. Turna/G has operational capability of beyond-visual-range (BVR), which its forerunner Turne/S lacked. It was introduced in 2003, and went into production in late 2004.

Turna/G was propelled by an air-cooled rotary engine of type AR741 made by UAV Engines Ltd in the United Kingdom. The single engine developed a power of 38 hp (28 kW). The drone was later fitted with a turboprop engine of type TEI-TP-1X, a small centrifugal gas turbine, manufactured by TAI's subsidiary Tusaş Engine Industries (TEI). This version made its first test flight on April 4, 2008.

The delta-winged UAV with V-tail has all composite material airframe. Payloads of the drone are passive radar cross-section enhancer (Luneburg lens), acoustic miss distance indicator (MDI), infrared flares and smoke. Data link is accomplished by encrypted real-time telemetry, and guidance/tracking takes place fully autonomous based on GPS integrated waypoint navigation system. The target drone takes off from a catapult launcher on land or from naval vessel, and is recovered by parachute or lands on skid in water.

== Variants ==
- Turna/S, standard version
- Turna/G, advanced version

== Specifications (Turna/G) ==
Data from RUVSA Russian Unmanned Vehicle Systems Association

General characteristics

- Crew: 0
- Length: 2.60 m (8 ft 6 in)
- Wingspan: 2.70 m (8 ft 10 in)
- Height: 0.57 m (1 ft 10 in)
- Empty weight: 55 kg (121 lb)
- Max takeoff weight: 70 kg (154 lb)
- Powerplant: 1 × TEI-TP-1X 28 kW turboprop

Performance

- Maximum speed: 330 km/h (210 mph, 180 kn)
- Endurance: 90 min
- Service ceiling: 3,650 m (11,980 ft)
