= Türksat 4A =

Turkish communications satellite

- Mission type: Communication
- Operator: Türksat
- COSPAR ID: 2014-007A
- SATCAT no.: 39522
- Mission duration: 15 years

Spacecraft properties
- Bus: MELCO DS2000
- Manufacturer: MELCO
- Launch mass: ~4,910 kilograms (10,820 lb)
- Power: 7,670 Watts

Start of mission
- Launch date: February 14, 2014, 21:09:03 UTC
- Rocket: Proton-M/Briz-M
- Launch site: Baikonur Site 81/24
- Contractor: ILS

Orbital parameters
- Reference system: Geocentric
- Regime: Geostationary
- Longitude: 42° East

Transponders
- Band: 28 K_{u} band 2 K_{a} band
- Bandwidth: 1,750 megahertz (total)

Türksat 4A is a Turkish communications satellite, operated by Türksat. It was constructed by Mitsubishi Electric (MELCO) of Japan, based on the MELCO DS2000 satellite bus, and was launched by the American-Russian joint-venture company International Launch Services (ILS) atop a Russian Proton-M space launch vehicle on February 14, 2014, at 21:09:03 from Site 81/24 of the Baikonur Cosmodrome in Kazakhstan.

The in-orbit delivery contract for the satellite was signed in March 2011. In the scope of the contract, Turkish engineers were trained in the facilities of MELCO in Japan. During the official visit of Prime Minister Recep Tayyip Erdoğan to Japan, the satellite was handed over by the Mitsubishi Electric to the Turkish officials in a ceremony on January 8, 2014.

The initially planned launch date of Türksat 4A in November 2013 was postponed to February 2014 due to the suspension of the Proton-M launches because of problems, which arose on December 8, 2012.

Türksat 4A is part of the Turksat series of satellites, and was placed in a temporary geosynchronous orbit at 50°E, where it will remain around three months. During this period, orbital and subsystem tests will be conducted. Thenafter, the satellite will be transferred to 42°E to provide telecommunication and direct TV broadcasting services over a wide geographic region between west of China and east of England spanning Turkey, as well as Europe, Central Asia, the Middle East and Africa.

Right after the satellite reached orbit, mission control and operational support was taken over by Gölbaşı Ground Station in Ankara, which will conduct performance tests around month long. The first signal from the satellite is expected to arrive 9 hours and 13 minutes after the launch.

Türksat 4A has a mass of approximately 4,910 kg (10,820 lb) and an expected on-orbit life time of 15 years. It will consist of 28 K_{u} band, two K_{a} band and an undisclosed number of C band transponders. The use of K_{a} band will allow higher bandwidth communication, and thus reaching the southern regions of the Sahara in Africa that was not possible with former Türksat satellites. Türksat 4A will enable to cut cost of internet access, and will be also available for military-purpose broadcasting. It is expected that Türksat 4A will increase the communications capacity of Turkey three-fold.

== See also ==
- Turksat (satellite)
