= Türksat 3A =

Turkish communications satellite

- Mission type: Communication
- Operator: Türksat
- COSPAR ID: 2008-030B
- SATCAT no.: 33056
- Mission duration: 15 years

Spacecraft properties
- Bus: Spacebus 4000B2
- Manufacturer: Thales Alenia Space
- Launch mass: 3,060 kilograms (6,750 lb)
- Power: 8.1 kilowatts

Start of mission
- Launch date: 12 June 2008, 22:05 UTC
- Rocket: Ariane 5ECA
- Launch site: Kourou ELA-3
- Contractor: Arianespace

Orbital parameters
- Reference system: Geocentric
- Regime: Geostationary
- Longitude: 42° East

Transponders
- Band: 24 IEEE K_{u} band (NATO J-band)
- Bandwidth: 12×36 megahertz 12×72 megahertz

Türksat 3A is a Turkish communications satellite, operated by Türksat. It was constructed by Thales Alenia Space, based on the Spacebus 4000B2 satellite bus, and was launched by Arianespace atop an Ariane 5ECA launch vehicle, along with the British Skynet 5C satellite, in a dual-payload launch on 12 June 2008 at 22:05:02 GMT, from ELA-3 at the Guiana Space Centre in Kourou, French Guiana.

It is part of the Turksat series of satellites, and is placed in geosynchronous orbit at 42°E to provide communications services to Turkey, Europe and the Middle East.

The contract for the construction and in-orbit delivery of Türksat 3A was announced in February 2006.

Positioned at 42°E, Türksat 3A replaced the aging Türksat 1C, which entered service in 1996. It consists of 24 K_{u} band transponders, nine with 36Mhz, 12 with 36 MHz and 12 with 72 MHz bandwidth. Turksat 3A was originally intended to start services at the beginning of 2008.

== See also ==
- Turksat (satellite)
