= Türksat (company) =

Communications satellite, internet, and pay television company in Turkey

Türksat A.Ş.
- Industry: Media
- Founded: December 1990, 21; 35 years ago
- Headquarters: Gölbaşı, Ankara, Turkey
- Products: Communications satellites Pay TV services Programming; Cable internet
- Revenue: ₺13.851 billion (2023)
- Net income: ₺1.536 billion (2023)
- Total assets: ₺41.663 billion (2023)
- Total equity: ₺25.411 billion (2023)
- Owner: Turkey Wealth Fund
- Website: turksat.com.tr/en

Türksat Satellite Communications Cable TV and Operations Incorporated (Turkish: Türksat Uydu Haberleşme Kablo TV ve İşletme A.Ş.) is the sole communications satellite operator in Turkey. It was established on 21 December 1990 as a state-owned company named Türksat Milli Haberleşme Uyduları (Türksat National Communications Satellites) in Gölbaşı, Ankara Province; eventually incorporating the satellite services of Türk Telekomünikasyon A.Ş. and becoming Türksat A.Ş. on 22 July 2004. Türksat A.Ş. also owns 100% of the shares of Eurasiasat S.A.M., jointly established as a spin-off company with Aérospatiale in 1996 to manufacture and launch Türksat 2A (Eurasiasat 1) in 2001.

Hasan Hüseyin ERTOK was appointed as the General Manager of Türksat A.Ş on January 21, 2021.

== Satellites ==
Türksat A.Ş. has launched the Türksat series of satellites, and operated in the past Türksat 1C, Türksat 2A, Türksat 3A and Astra 1D (lease capacity) communications satellites. Currently, Türksat 4A is in operation. The company conducts satellite telecommunication at its Gölbaşı Ground Station in Ankara. Türksat 4A was launched on 17 February 2014 in cooperation with Rosoboronexport.

Satellite	Launch Date	Launch site	Launcher	Mass	Status	Note
(Turkey) Türksat 1A	24 January 1994	(European Union) ELA-2 Guiana Space Centre	(European Union) Ariane-44LP H10+	1,743 kg (3,843 lb)	Failed	
(Turkey) Türksat 1B	10 August 1994	(European Union) ELA-2 Guiana Space Centre	(European Union) Ariane-44LP H10+	1,743 kg (3,843 lb)	Decommissioned (2006)	
(Turkey) Türksat 1C	9 July 1996	(European Union) ELA-2 Guiana Space Centre	(European Union) Ariane-44L H10-3	1,743 kg (3,843 lb)	Decommissioned (2010)	
(Turkey) Türksat 2A	10 January 2001	(European Union) ELA-2 Guiana Space Centre	(European Union) Ariane-44P H10-3	3,530 kg (7,780 lb)	Decommissioned (2016)	Eurasiasat 1
(Turkey) Türksat 3A	12 June 2008	(European Union) ELA-3 Guiana Space Centre	(European Union) Ariane 5ECA	3,110 kg (6,860 lb)	In Service	
(Turkey) Türksat 4A	14 February 2014	(Kazakhstan) Baikonur Cosmodrome Site 81/24	(Russia) Proton-M/Briz-M	4,850 kg (10,690 lb)	In Service	
(Turkey) Türksat 4B	16 October 2015	(Kazakhstan) Baikonur Cosmodrome Site 200/39	(Russia) Proton-M/Briz-M	4,924 kg (10,856 lb)	In Service	
(Turkey) Türksat 5A	8 January 2021	(United States) Cape Canaveral SLC-40	(United States) Falcon 9 Block 5	3,500 kg (7,700 lb)	In Service	
(Turkey) Türksat 5B	19 December 2021	(United States) Cape Canaveral SLC-40	(United States) Falcon 9 Block 5	4,500 kg (9,900 lb)	In Service	
(Turkey) Türksat 6A	8 July 2024	(United States) Cape Canaveral SLC-40	(United States) Falcon 9 Block 5	4,250 kg (9,370 lb)	In Service	

== Cable TV and internet service ==
Turksat founded Teledünya, a digital cable TV and internet service, on 1 November 2008.

== See also ==
- Türksat (satellite)
