= Türksat 1B =

Decommissioned Turkish communications satellite

- Mission type: Communication
- Operator: Türksat
- COSPAR ID: 1994-049B
- SATCAT no.: 23200

Spacecraft properties
- Bus: Spacebus 2000
- Manufacturer: Aérospatiale

Start of mission
- Launch date: August 10, 1994, 23:05 UTC
- Rocket: Ariane 44LP H10+
- Launch site: Kourou ELA-2

End of mission
- Deactivated: October 17, 2006

Orbital parameters
- Reference system: Geocentric
- Regime: Geostationary
- Longitude: 42°E

Transponders
- Band: 16 K_{u} band

Turksat 1B was a Turkish communications satellite as part of a project to form an instant network with two geosynchronous satellites that is supervised by the companies Türksat A.Ş. in Turkey and Aérospatiale of France.

Türksat 1B was launched by Arianespace atop an Ariane-44LP H10+ launch vehicle, along with Brazilian satellite Brasilsat B1, in a dual-payload launch on August 10, 1994, at 23:05 UTC from ELA-2 at the Guiana Space Centre in Kourou, French Guiana. The satellite was successfully placed into geostationary transfer orbit and positioned at 42°E.

It is based on the Aerospatiale Spacebus 2000 series having an on-orbit mass of about one ton. The communications payload consists of 16 K_{u} band transponders with six wideband channels of 72 MHz and ten narrowband of 36 MHz.

In addition to Turkey, the satellite covered a geographical range from Europe to Central Asia before completing its mission in 2006.

== See also ==
- Turksat (satellite)
