= Turkish Aerospace Industries =

Turkish aerospace and defense company

Turkish Aerospace Inc.
- Native name: Türk Havacılık Ve Uzay Sanayi Anonim Şirketi (TUSAŞ)
- Type: Incorporated company
- Industry: Aerospace and arms industry
- Predecessor: Turkish Aircraft Industries Corporation; TUSAS Aerospace Industries, Inc.
- Founded: 28 June 1973 (Note: current form)
- Headquarters: Kahramankazan, Ankara, Turkey
- Area served: Worldwide
- Key people: Ömer Cihad Vardan (chairman); Mehmet Demiroğlu (president & CEO)
- Products: Aircraft, helicopters, satellites, unmanned aerial vehicles
- Revenue: ₺63.58 billion (US$1.61 billion) (2023)
- Owner: Turkish Armed Forces Foundation (54.49%); Defence Industry Agency (45.45%); Turkish Aeronautical Association (0.06%)
- Number of employees: 17,000 (7000 engineers 6000 technicians) (January 2024)
- Divisions: Aerostructures Group; Aircraft Group; Helicopter Group; UAS Group; Space Systems Group
- Website: www.tusas.com

Turkish Aerospace Industries Inc. (Turkish: Türk Havacılık ve Uzay Sanayi A.Ş., abbr. TAI or TUSAŞ) is a state-owned arms company in Turkey.

== History ==
Turkish Aerospace was incorporated under the Ministry of Industry and Technology on June 28, 1973 to reduce Turkey’s foreign dependence in defense industry.

With the decision to use F-16 aircraft to meet the Turkish Air Force's fighter aircraft need, Turkish Aerospace was incorporated by TAI in 1984 for a period of 25 years as a Turkish-U.S. joint investment company to carry out the manufacture of F-16 aircraft, integration of on-board systems and flight tests .

Before the end of the 25-year period, Turkish Aerospace was restructured through the purchase of Turkish Aerospace's foreign shares by Turkish shareholders in 2005. Thereunder, TAI and TUSAŞ were merged under Turkish Aerospace Inc. to broaden its activities and has become Turkey's technology center for the development, modernization, manufacture, system integration and lifecycle support of the aviation and space industry systems.

Being among the top hundred global players in aviation and space industry, Turkish Aerospace is organized under six strategic business centers depending on the projects, including:

- Aviation Structurals Group
- Aircraft Group,
- Helicopter Group,
- Unmanned Aerial Vehicle (UAV) Systems Group,
- Space Systems Group,
- National Combat Aircraft (NCA) Group
- Engineering Group

In addition, integrated logistics support is provided for all products designed/manufactured by Turkish Aerospace

== Projects ==
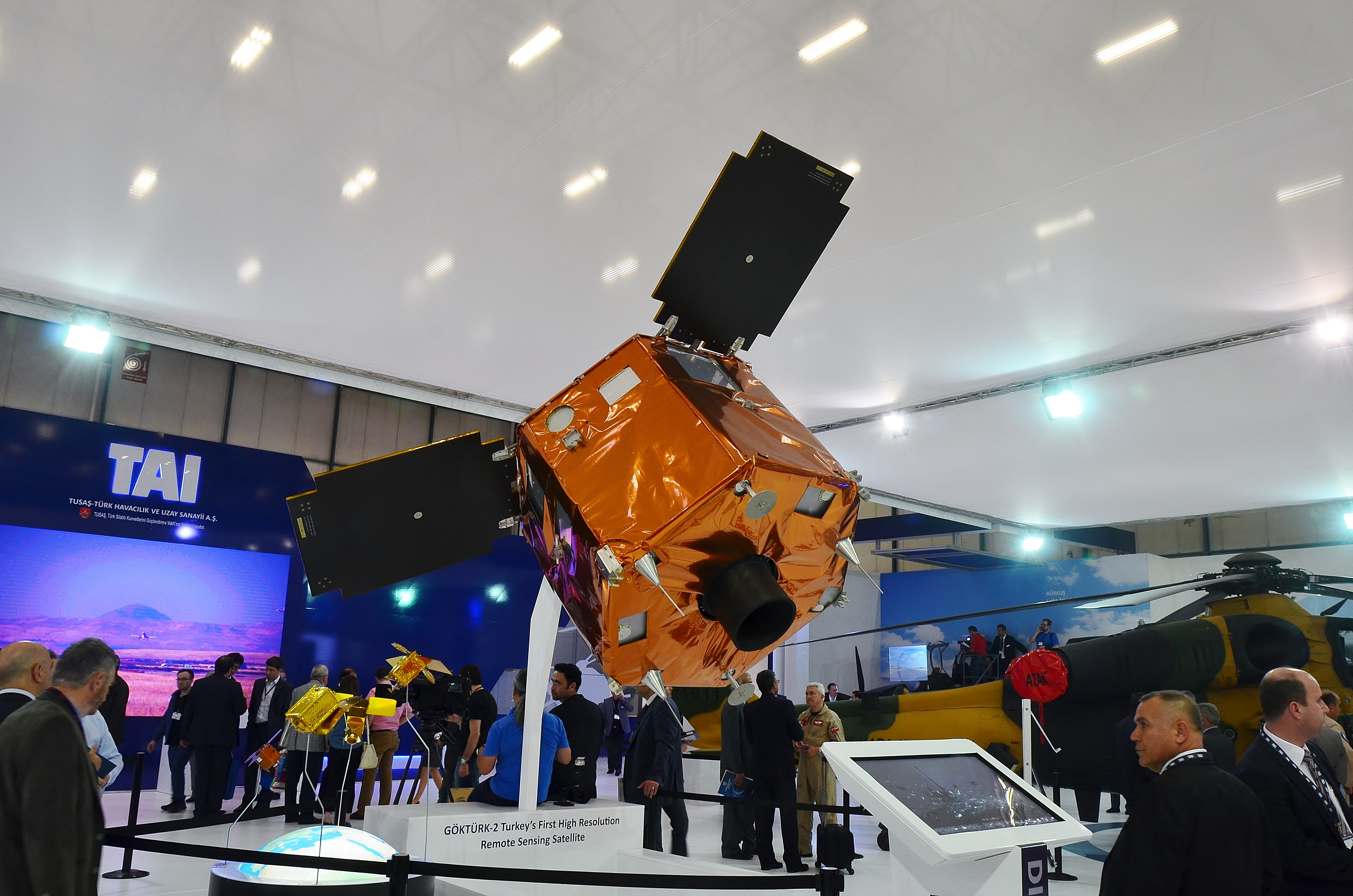
Model of reconnaissance and military satellite Göktürk-2 during the IDEF 2015

TAI, which had a single program (the co-production of the F-16 Fighting Falcon) at its establishment phase, is working on over 50 military and commercial programs today. As a partner of the Airbus Defence and Space, TAI has been participating in the design and development activities of the Airbus A400M program with the leading European aerospace companies; namely Airbus (France, Germany, Spain and UK), EADS CASA (Spain) and FLABEL (Belgium) from the beginning of the project. TAI has accepted the production of A350XWB's winglets with the new cooperation.

TAI's experience includes the licensed production of General Dynamics F-16 Fighting Falcon jets, CASA/IPTN CN-235 light transport/maritime patrol/surveillance aircraft, SIAI-Marchetti SF.260 trainers, Cougar AS-532 search and rescue (SAR), combat search and rescue (CSAR) and utility helicopters as well as the design and development of Unmanned aerial vehicles (UAVs), target drones and agricultural aircraft.

TAI manufactures Section 18 fuselage panels for Airbus 319/320/321 aircraft, wing tips and flight deck panels for Boeing 737 aircraft, rear doors and engine cowlings for Eurocopter EC135 helicopters, MD 902 fuselage for MD Helicopters, horizontal stabilizers, tail rotor pylons and tail booms for Sikorsky S-70A and MH-60 helicopters, horizontal stabilizers for Sikorsky S-76 helicopters and AB139 fuselages for Agusta. Furthermore, TAI manufactures nose landing gear doors for the Boeing 747, dorsal fin for 777 and parts/subassembly parts for 737/767/777. It also manufactures seven components of the Eurocopter AS 532 helicopter.

TAI is engaged in manufacturing aerostructures for fixed and rotary wing, military and commercial aircraft for worldwide customers. TAI is in various partnership arrangements with AgustaWestland, Airbus, Alenia Aermacchi, Boeing, IAI, Lockheed Martin, Northrop Grumman, MD Helicopters, Sikorsky, Indonesian Aerospace and numerous other companies in aerospace sector.

TAI's core business also includes modernization, modification and systems integration programs and after sales support of both fixed and rotary wing military and commercial aircraft that are in the inventory of Turkey and its allies.

=== National Products Projects ===
Since the 2010s, TAI has focused on developing domestic products. Priority was given to unmanned aerial systems. In 2010, the unmanned aerial vehicle Anka was produced and its first flight was made. In 2013, the turboprop training aircraft Hürkuş was produced and its first flight was made. In 2018, the T625 Gökbey utility helicopter was produced and its first flight was made. In 2019, the first flight of the twin-engine Aksungur, an advanced version of Anka, took place. In 2023, TAI realized two major projects. Hürjet, the first Turkish jet trainer fighter aircraft, and the Anka-3, a jet-powered stealth unmanned combat aerial vehicle, made their first flights in 2023. In 2024, TAI's fifth-generation stealth fighter aircraft project, Kaan, made its first flight.

TAI, as a major partner, has initiated numerous domestic engine projects through Tusaş Engine Industries (TEI), the engine company it established in collaboration with GE Aerospace. The company has produced the PD170 engine for unmanned aerial vehicles, the TS1400 engine for helicopters, and the TF6000 engine for jet aircraft. In 2025, the TF35000 project was announced for the Kaan fifth-generation fighter jet.

TAI's Hürkuş basic trainer aircraft has been granted air worthiness type certification, the company announced at the 2016 Farnborough International Airshow.

=== Other projects ===
In May 2015 the Turkish regional jet project was launched, which consisted of the indigenous production of two regional aircraft in different sizes. The 32-seat TRJ-328 jet with a range up to 2,000 nmi (2,300 mi; 3,700 km) was planned to enter service in 2019. It was a Fairchild Dornier 328JET-based, modernized aircraft with new cockpit and engines. The larger, 70-seat TRJ-628 jet would be ready in 2023. The project has since been cancelled.

Turkish Aerospace/TUSAS produced 46 F-16s for the Egyptian Air Force between 1993 and 1995 under the agreement signed between the Governments of Turkey and the Arab Republic of Egypt. A contract to produce 46 Block 40 F-16C/D's for the Egyptian Air Force was placed with TUSAS Aerospace Industries (TAI) of Turkey. 34 of them will be F-16C's, 12 will be F-16D's. This was carried out under the auspices of the Peace Vector IV program, and marked the first sale of a foreign-built Fighting Falcon to a third-party nation in the history of the F-16 program.

In June 2024 news media reported that TAI was responsible for introducing questionable titanium into the supply chain for aircraft parts which ultimately were used to manufacture some Boeing and Airbus passenger planes built between 2019 and 2023. The titanium sold by TAI included falsified authenticity documents that originated from a metals supplier in China, calling into question whether the titanium was of suitable aviation-grade. However, Spirit's testing has confirmed that the titanium is the appropriate grade for airplane manufacturers.

=== Major programs ===
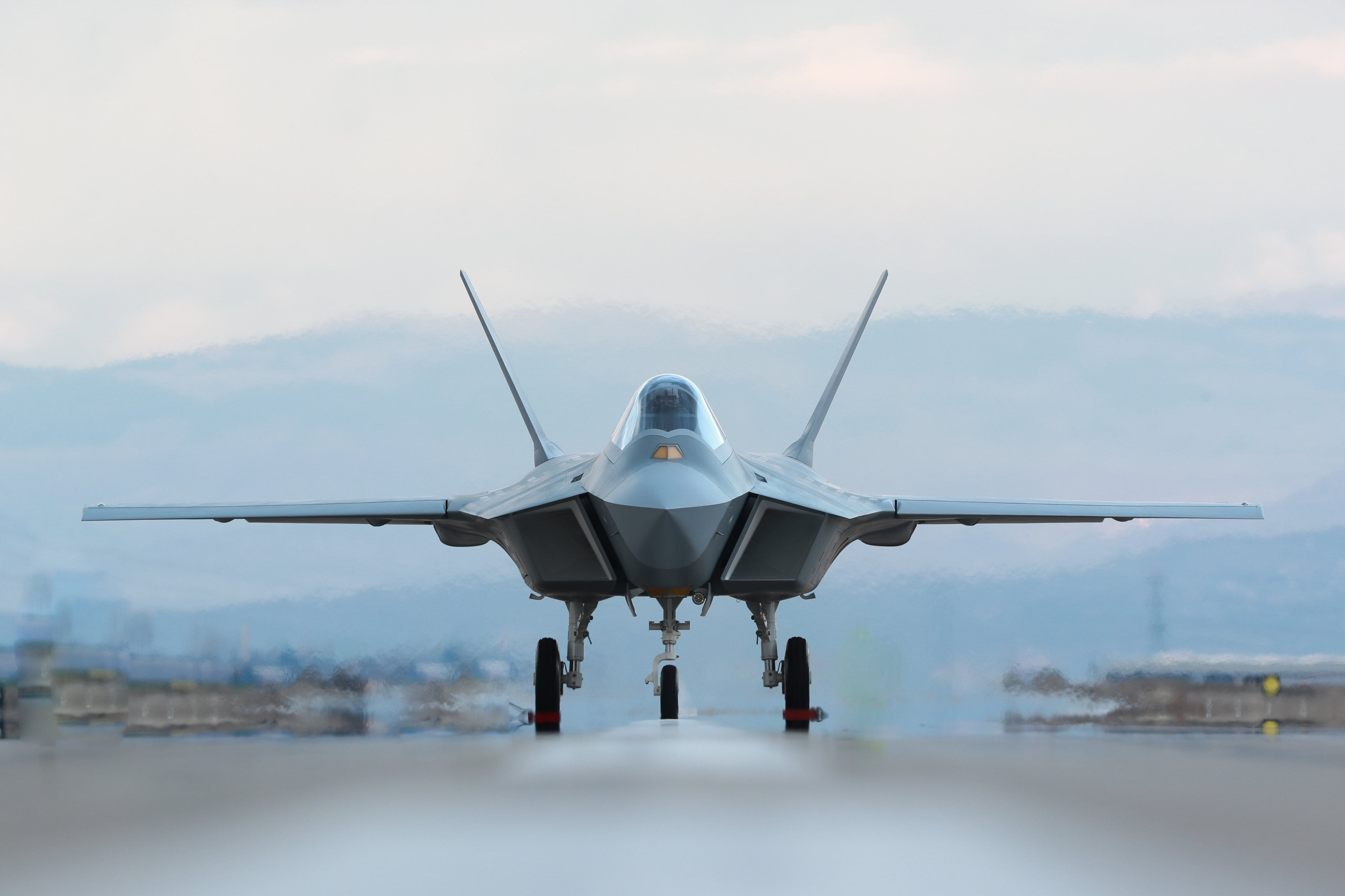
TAI Kaan

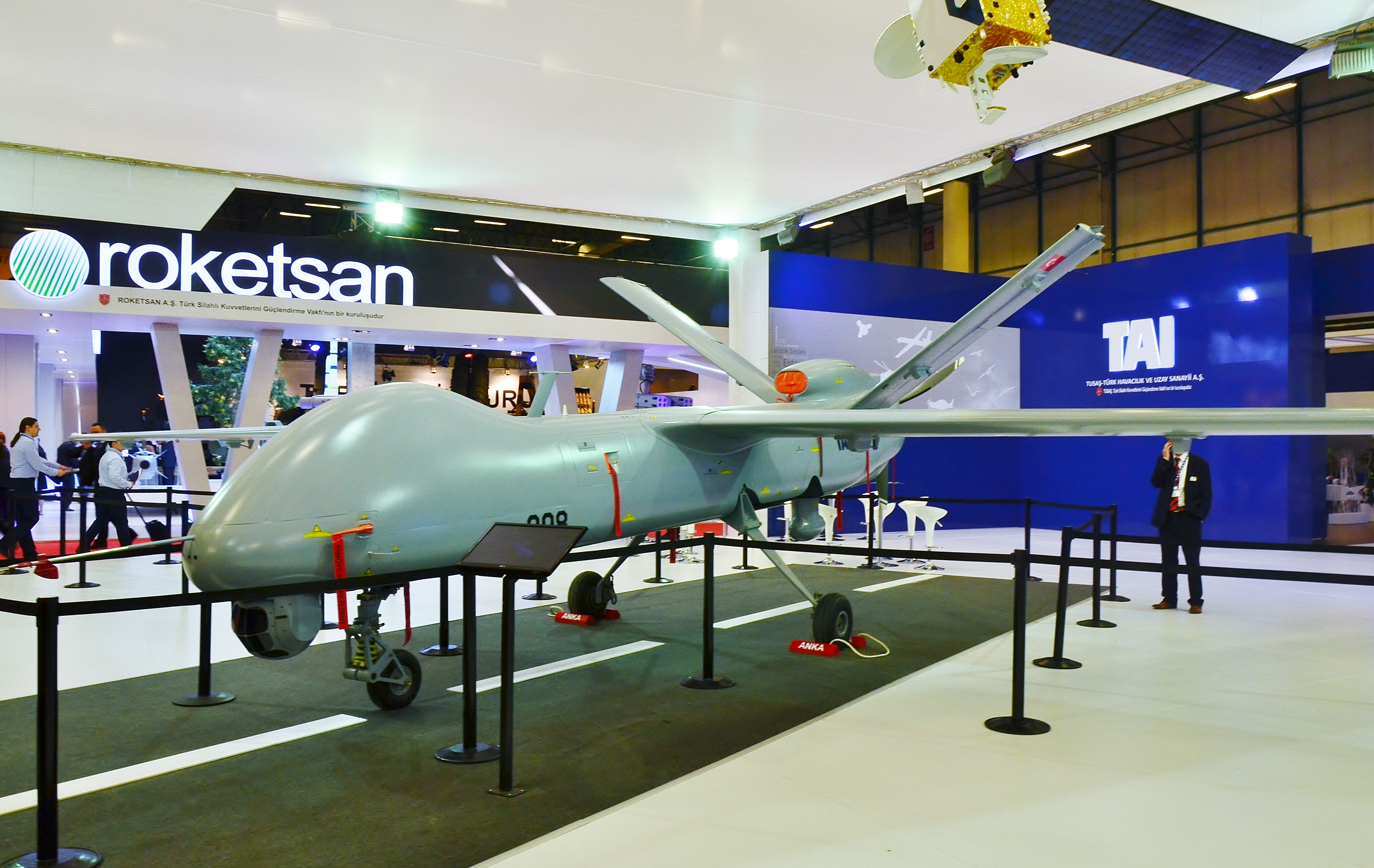
TAI Anka during the IDEF 2015

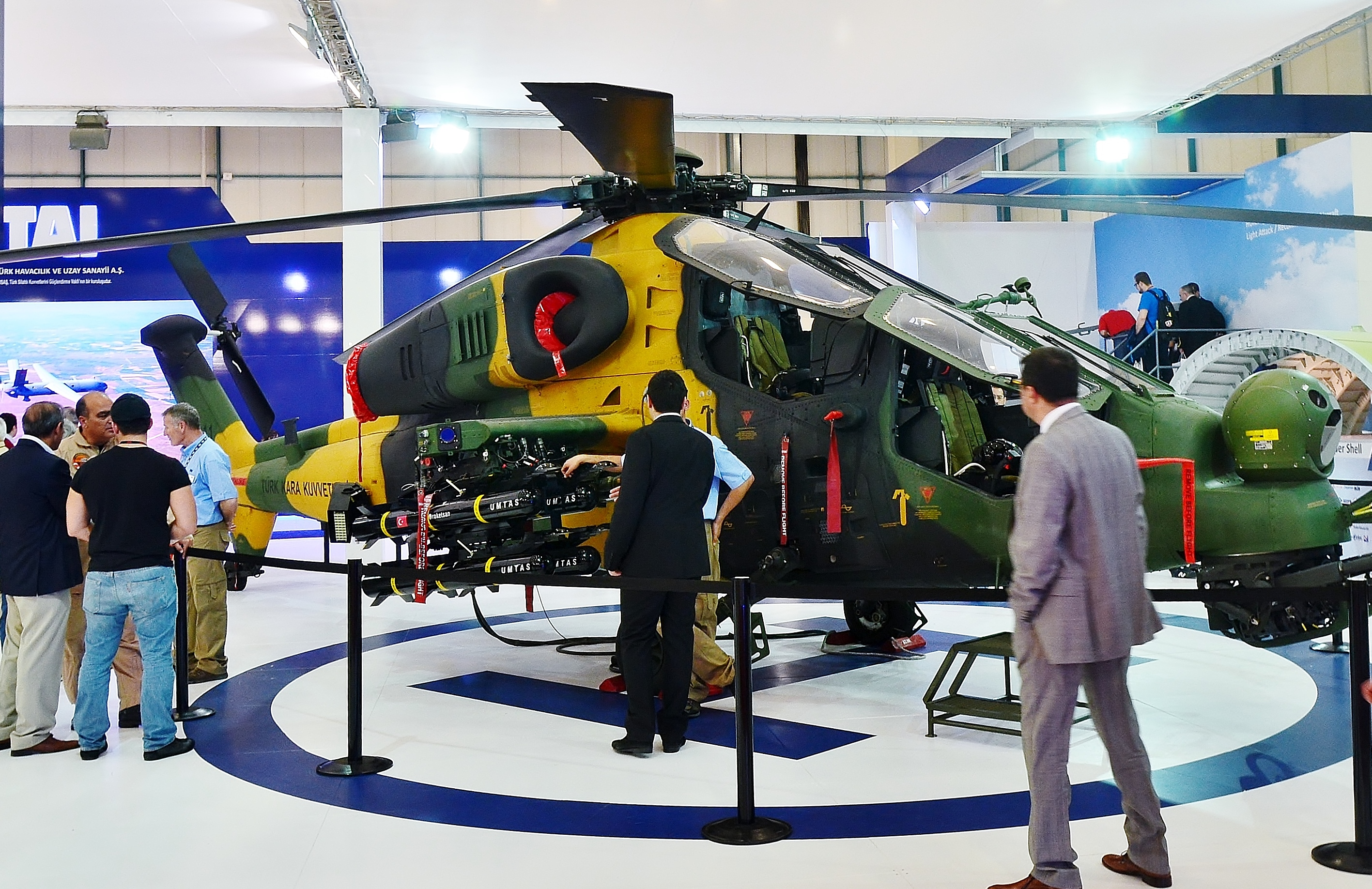
T129 ATAK helicopter of the Turkish Army during the IDEF 2015

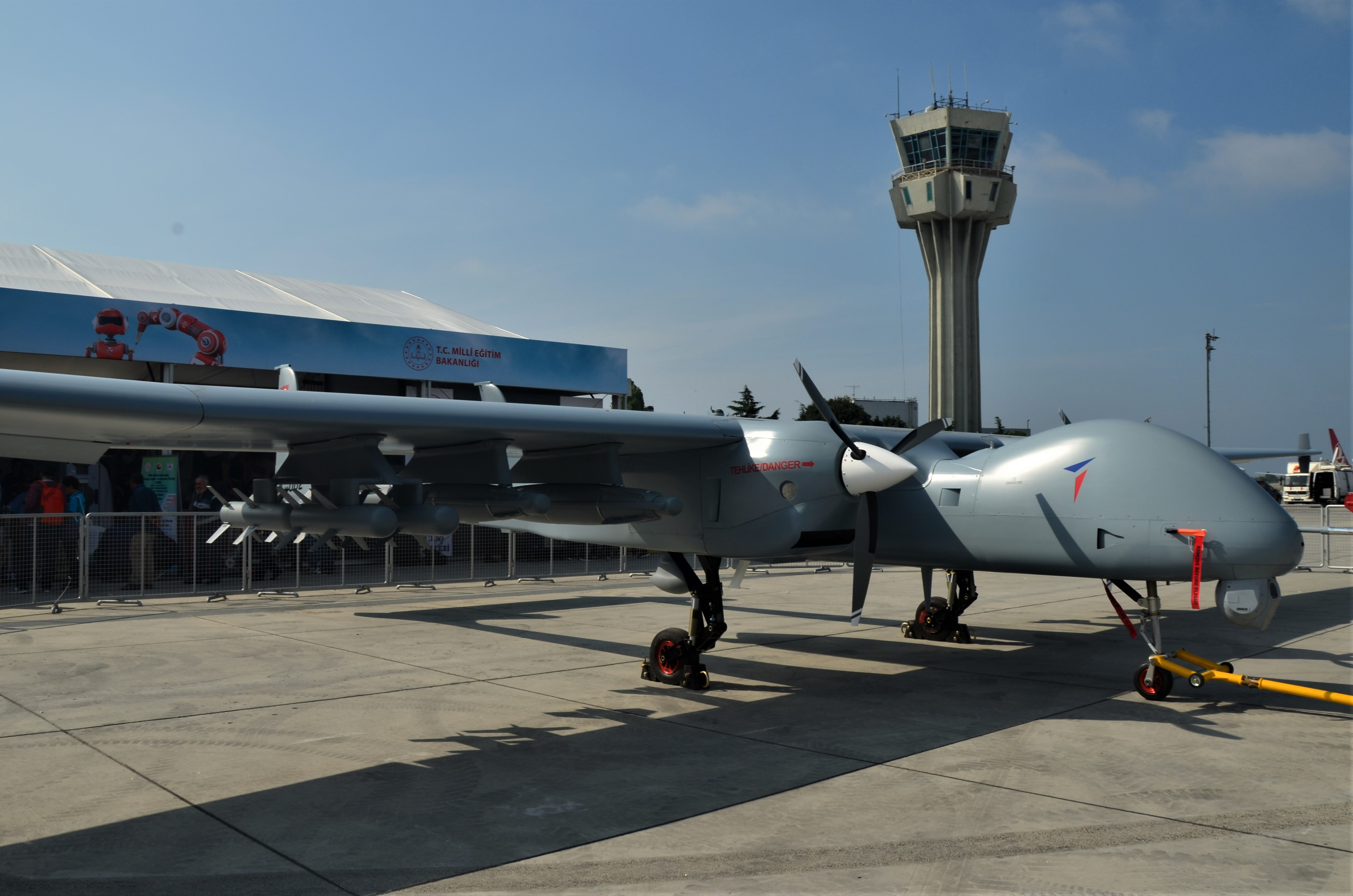
TAI Aksungur at Teknofest 2019

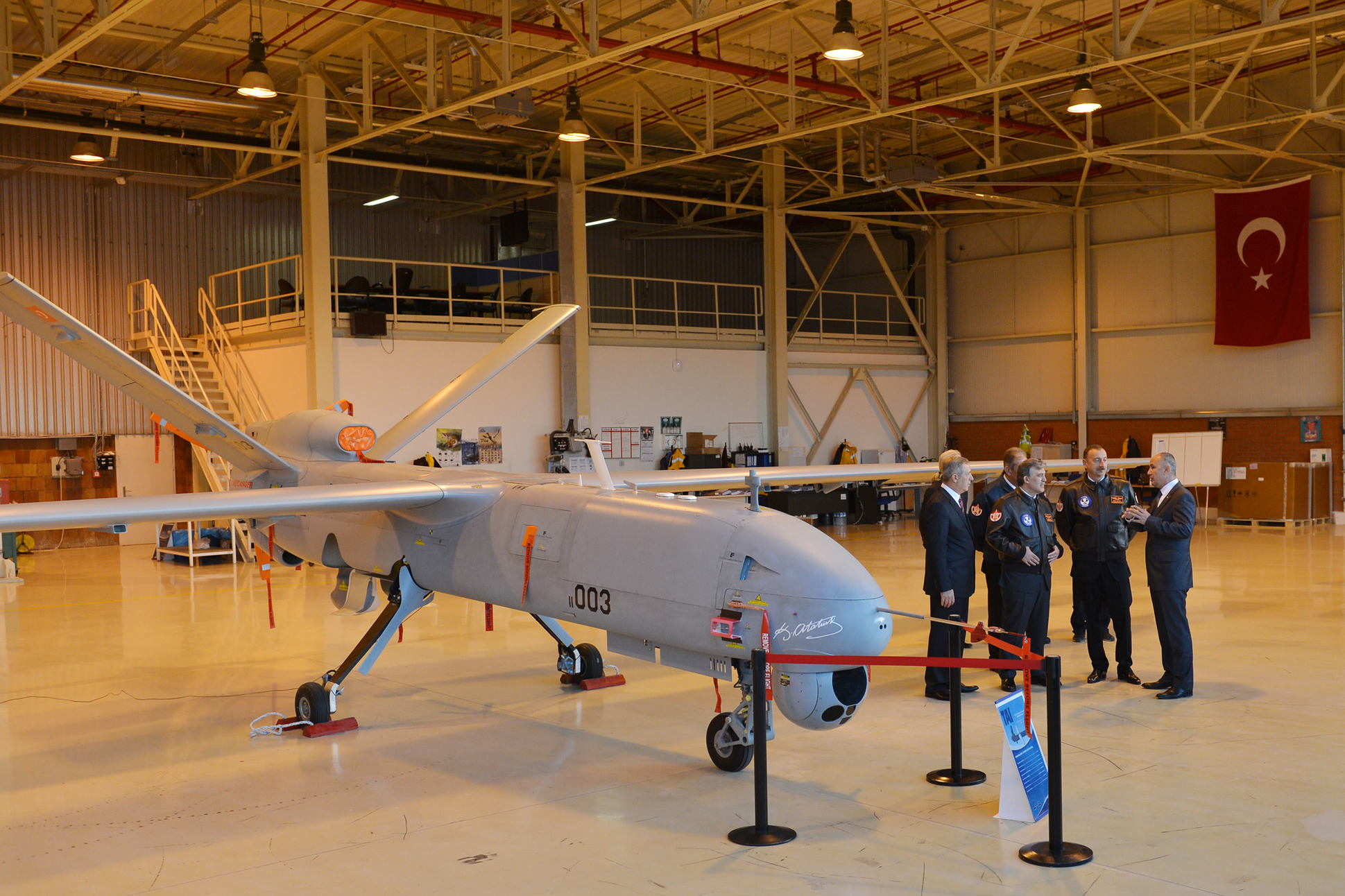
President Abdullah Gül and Ilham Aliyev at Turkish Aerospace Industries, 2013

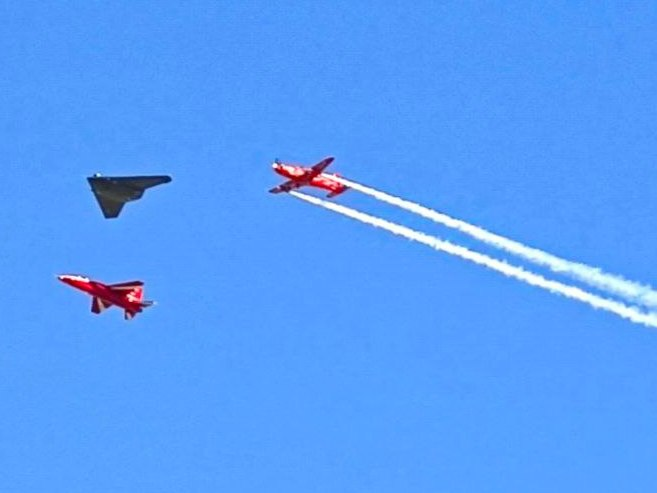
TAI Anka-3 (center) flying in formation with a TAI Hürjet (left) and a TAI Hürkuş (right) in 2024

- Electronic warfare retrofit and structural modifications on Turkish Air Force (TuAF) F-16s.
- MLU, Falcon-Up and Falcon Star Modifications on the Royal Jordanian Air Force (RJAF) F-16s,
- Modifications of 41 F-16A/B Block 15 aircraft of the Pakistan Air Force to F-16AM/BM Block 15 MLU standard.
- Modification of the S-2E Tracker Maritime Patrol Aircraft into Fire Fighting Aircraft
- CN-235 and Black Hawk modifications for the Turkish Special Forces
- Modification of CN-235 platforms for MPA/MSA missions for the Turkish Navy and Coast Guard
- Modification and modernization of Eurocopter AS 532,
- Glass Cockpit Retrofit of S-70 helicopters,
- Conversion of B737-700 aircraft AEW&C aircraft,
- Avionics modernization of C-130 aircraft for the Turkish Air Force (TuAF),
- Production and Maintenance, Repair and Overhaul (MRO) of the center fuselage of Joint Strike Fighter F-35 aircraft,
- Participating in the design and development of the A400M military transport and tanker aircraft,
- Avionics modernization of T-38 aircraft for the TuAF,
- License production of the attack helicopter Agusta A129 Mangusta as T-129 for the Turkish Armed Forces (TAF).
- Design, development and production of TAI Hürkuş (Turkish Primary and Basic Training Aircraft) with EASA CS-23 certification.
- Design, development and production of Anka unmanned aerial vehicle for the TuAF.

== Products ==
=== Aircraft ===
- TAI Kaan, stealth twin-engine all-weather fifth generation air superiority fighter
- TAI Hürjet, advanced jet trainer and light attack aircraft
- TAI Hürkuş, two-seat, single engine, turboprop aircraft for training and ground attack
- TAI General Aviation Aircraft, for airline pilot training

=== Helicopters ===
- TAI/AgustaWestland T129 ATAK, light attack helicopter, based on Agusta A129 Mangusta
- TAI T629, medium attack helicopter
- TAI T929 ATAK 2, heavy attack helicopter
- TAI T625 Gökbey, light utility helicopter
- TAI T-70, medium utility helicopter, Turkish variants of Sikorsky S-70i
- TAI T925, heavy utility helicopter

=== Unmanned aerial vehicles ===
- TAI Aksungur MALE ISTAR
- TAI Anka-A (TIHA-A) (2013), MALE ISTAR UAV
- TAI Anka-B (TIHA-B) (2013), MALE UAV
- TAI Anka-S, MALE UCAV
- TAI Anka-3, flying wing design stealth uncrewed fighter
- TAI Anka-4, stealth uncrewed fighter
- TAI Baykuş (2004), tactical surveillance drone
- TAI Gözcü (2007), short-range tactical ISTAR drone
- TAI Gölge, Stealth, Propeller-driven, ISR&EW UAV.
  - TAI Gölge was unveiled at the SAHA Expo 2026 in Istanbul. Gölge is a compact tactical UAV designed for ISR and EW missions. It has a stealth, flying-wing–influenced delta configuration with internal payload bays. The aircraft is powered by a 14 hp two-cylinder piston engine in a pusher configuration, driving a two-bladed propeller. It is launched via a ground-based catapult system and recovered using a parachute-assisted landing system. Gölge incorporates a modular payload architecture that allows the integration of EO/IR sensors and EW systems. It uses autonomous flight control with GNSS-based navigation, anti-jamming capabilities, and a line-of-sight datalink for communication with the ground control station. According to TAI and exhibition sources, Gölge has a wingspan of approximately 5 metres, a maximum take-off weight of around 100 kg (including a payload capacity of up to 15 kg), an endurance of up to 10 hours, a range of approximately 1,300 km, and a service ceiling of around 12,000 feet (3,660 m). Its maximum speed is reported to be approximately 165 km/h.

- TAI Keklik (2001), target drone for tracking and non-firing exercise
- TAI Martı (2003), surveillance drone
- TAI Pelikan (IHA-X2), tactical ISTAR drone
- TAI Şimşek, high-speed target drone
- TAI Turna (2001), target drone for tracking and live firing
- TAI UAV-X1 (1982), surveillance drone

=== Satellites ===
- Göktürk-1, Earth observation satellite
- Göktürk-2 (launched 2012), Earth observation satellite
- Göktürk-3 satellite
- Türksat 6A, communications satellite

TAI operates Turkish Satellite Assembly, Integration and Test Center.

== See also ==
- CTech, a subsidiary for satellite and line-of-sight communication technologies
- TEI
