= 42nd meridian east =

Line of longitude

42nd meridian east

The meridian 42° east of Greenwich is a line of longitude that extends from the North Pole across the Arctic Ocean, Europe, Asia, Africa, the Indian Ocean, the Southern Ocean, and Antarctica to the South Pole.

The 42nd meridian east forms a great circle with the 138th meridian west.

== From Pole to Pole ==
Starting at the North Pole and heading south to the South Pole, the 42nd meridian east passes through:

Co-ordinates	Country, territory or sea	Notes
90°0′N 42°0′E	Arctic Ocean	
80°30′N 42°0′E	Barents Sea	
68°29′N 42°0′E	White Sea	
66°23′N 42°0′E	Russia	
43°13′N 42°0′E	Abkhazia or Georgia	Abkhazia is a partially recognised state. Most nations consider its territory to be part of Georgia.
43°1′N 42°0′E	Georgia	
41°30′N 42°0′E	Turkey	
37°10′N 42°0′E	Syria	
36°44′N 42°0′E	Iraq	
31°9′N 42°0′E	Saudi Arabia	
17°42′N 42°0′E	Red Sea	
16°51′N 42°0′E	Saudi Arabia	Farasan Islands
16°38′N 42°0′E	Red Sea	
13°48′N 42°0′E	Eritrea	
12°50′N 42°0′E	Ethiopia	
11°52′N 42°0′E	Djibouti	
10°55′N 42°0′E	Ethiopia	
4°6′N 42°0′E	Somalia	
0°59′S 42°0′E	Indian Ocean	
60°0′S 42°0′E	Southern Ocean	
68°22′S 42°0′E	Antarctica	Queen Maud Land, claimed by Norway

== See also ==
- 41st meridian east
- 43rd meridian east
