= List of Spacebus satellites =

== Satellite orders ==
=== Spacebus-300 ===
Satellite	Country	Operator	Type	Coverage	Launch date (UTC)	Rocket	Changes	Status
TDF 1	France	TDF Group	Television broadcasting	5 Ku-band	28 October 1988	Ariane 2		Retired
TDF 2	France	TDF Group	Television broadcasting	5 Ku-band	24 July 1990	Ariane 44L		Retired
Tele-X	Sweden	SES Sirius	Communications	5 Ku-band	2 April 1989	Ariane 2		Retired
TV-SAT 1	Germany	Deutsche Bundespost	Television broadcasting	5 Ku-band	21 November 1987	Ariane 2		Retired
TV-SAT 2	Germany	Deutsche Bundespost	Television broadcasting	5 Ku-band	8 August 1989	Ariane 44LP		Active

=== Spacebus-1000 ===
Satellite	Country	Operator	Type	Coverage	Launch date (UTC)	Rocket	Changes	Status
Arabsat 1A	Saudi Arabia	Arabsat	Television broadcasting	25 C-band, 2 S-band	8 February 1985	Ariane 3		Retired
Arabsat 1B	Saudi Arabia	Arabsat	Television broadcasting	25 C-band, 2 S-band	17 June 1985	Space Shuttle		Retired
Arabsat 1C	Saudi Arabia	Arabsat	Television broadcasting	25 C-band, 2 S-band	26 February 1992	Ariane 44L	Known as INSAT-2DT	Retired

=== Spacebus-2000 ===
Satellite	Country	Operator	Type	Coverage	Launch date (UTC)	Rocket	Changes	Status
Eutelsat-2 F1	International	Eutelsat	Communications	16 Ku-band	30 August 1990	Ariane 44LP		Retired
Eutelsat-2 F2	International	Eutelsat	Communications	16 Ku-band	15 January 1991	Ariane 44L		Retired
Eutelsat-2 F3	International	Eutelsat	Communications	16 Ku-band	7 December 1991	Atlas II		Retired
Eutelsat-2 F4	International	Eutelsat	Communications	16 Ku-band	9 July 1992	Ariane 44L		Retired
Eutelsat-2 F5	International	Eutelsat	Communications	16 Ku-band	24 January 1994	Ariane 44L		Launch failure
GE 5	United States	SES Americom	Television broadcasting	16 Ku-band	28 December 1998	Ariane 44L	Known as AMC-5	Retired
Hotbird 1	International	Eutelsat	Television broadcasting	16 Ku-band	28 March 1995	Ariane 44LP		Retired
Nahuel 1A	Argentina	Nahuelsat	Communications	18 Ku-band	30 January 1997	Ariane 44L		Retired
Türksat 1A	Turkey	Türksat	Communications	16 Ku-band	24 January 1994	Ariane 44LP		Launch failure
Türksat 1B	Turkey	Türksat	Communications	16 Ku-band	10 August 1994	Ariane 44LP		Retired
Türksat 1C	Turkey	Türksat	Communications	16 Ku-band	9 July 1996	Ariane 44L		Active

=== Spacebus-3000A ===
Satellite	Country	Operator	Type	Coverage	Launch date (UTC)	Rocket	Changes	Status
Arabsat 2A	Saudi Arabia	Arabsat	Television broadcasting	22 C-band, 12 Ku-band	9 July 1996	Ariane 44L		Retired
Arabsat 2B	Saudi Arabia	Arabsat	Television broadcasting	22 C-band, 12 Ku-band	13 November 1996	Ariane 44L		Retired
Sinosat 1	China	Sino Satellite Communications	Television broadcasting	24 C-band, 14 Ku-band	18 July 1998	Long March 3B		Retired
Thaicom 3	Thailand	Thaicom	Television broadcasting	25 C-band, 14 Ku-band	16 April 1997	Ariane 44LP		Retired
Thaicom 5	Thailand	Thaicom	Television broadcasting	24 C-band, 14 Ku-band	27 May 2006	Ariane 5 ECA		Retired

=== Spacebus-3000B2 ===
Satellite	Country	Operator	Type	Coverage	Launch date (UTC)	Rocket	Changes	Status
Atlantic Bird 2	International	Eutelsat	Television broadcasting	26 Ku-band	25 September 2001	Ariane 44P	Known as Eutelsat 12 West B	Retired
Arabsat 3A	Saudi Arabia	Arabsat	Television broadcasting	26 Ku-band	26 February 1999	Ariane 44L		Retired
COMSAT Bw 1	Germany	MilSat Services GmbH for Bundeswehr	Military communications	4 SHF, 5 UHF	1 October 2009	Ariane 5 ECA		Active
COMSAT Bw 2	Germany	MilSat Services GmbH for Bundeswehr	Military communications	4 SHF, 5 UHF	21 May 2010	Ariane 5 ECA		Active
Eurobird 1	International	Eutelsat	Communications	24 Ku-band	8 March 2001	Ariane 5 G		Retired
Eutelsat W2	International	Eutelsat	Communications	24 Ku-band	5 October 1998	Ariane-44L		Retired
Eutelsat W3	International	Eutelsat	Communications	24 Ku-band	12 April 1999	Atlas IIAS	Known as Eutelsat 21A	Retired
Eutelsat W4	International	Eutelsat	Communications	31 Ku-band	24 May 2000	Atlas IIIA	Known as Eutelsat 21A	Retired
Eutelsat W5	International	Eutelsat	Communications	24 Ku-band	20 November 2002	Delta IV (4,2)	Known as Eutelsat 33B	Retired
Hispasat 1C	Spain	Hispasat	Television broadcasting	28 Ku-band	3 February 2000	Atlas IIAS	Known as Hispasat 84W-1	Retired
Hispasat 1D	Spain	Hispasat	Television broadcasting	28 Ku-band	18 September 2002	Atlas IIAS	Known as Hispasat 136W-1	Retired
Sirius 2	Spain	Hispasat	Television broadcasting	28 Ku-band	12 November 1997	Ariane-44L	Known as Astra 5A	Retired

=== Spacebus-3000B3 ===
Satellite	Country	Operator	Type	Coverage	Launch date (UTC)	Rocket	Changes	Status
AMC-9	United States	SES Americom	Television broadcasting	24 C-band, 24 Ka-band	6 June 2003	Proton-K Briz-M		Retired
Eurasiasat 1	Turkey	SES Americom	Television broadcasting	32 Ku-band	10 January 2001	Ariane-44P		Retired
Galaxy 17	United States	Intelsat	Television broadcasting	24 C-band, 24 Ku-band	4 May 2007	Ariane 5 ECA		Active
Hotbird 6	International	Eutelsat	Television broadcasting	28 Ku-band, 4 Ka-band	21 August 2002	Atlas V 401	Known as Eutelsat 70D	Retired
Hotbird 7A	International	Eutelsat	Television broadcasting	38 Ku-band	11 March 2006	Ariane 5 ECA	Known as Hotbird 13E	Active
Star One C1	Brazil	Star One	Communications	28 C-band, 16 Ku-band, 1 X-band	14 November 2007	Ariane 5 ECA		Retired
Star One C2	Brazil	Star One	Communications	28 C-band, 16 Ku-band, 1 X-band	18 April 2008	Ariane 5 ECA		Active
Stellat 5	France	Eutelsat	Communications	35 Ku-band, 10 C-band	5 July 2002	Ariane 5 G		Retired
Stentor	France	Eutelsat	Experimental communications	6 Ku-band, 1 EHF	11 December 2002	Ariane 5 G		Launch failure

=== Spacebus-3000B3S ===
Satellite	Country	Operator	Type	Coverage	Launch date (UTC)	Rocket	Changes	Status
Astra 1K	Luxembourg	SES Astra	Television broadcasting	52 Ku-band, 2 Ka-band	25 November 2002	Proton-K Blok-DM3		Launch failure

=== Spacebus-4000B2 ===
Satellite	Country	Operator	Type	Coverage	Launch date (UTC)	Rocket	Changes	Status
Athena-Fidus	France, Italy	CNES, DGA, ASI	Military communications	EHF, Ka-band	6 February 2014	Ariane 5 ECA		Active
Bangabandhu 1	Bangladesh	BTRC	Communications	14 C-band, 26 Ku-band	11 May 2018	Falcon 9	Known as BD 1	Active
Inmarsat-5 F5	International	Inmarsat	Satellite internet	72 Ka-band	26 November 2019	Ariane 5 ECA	Known as GX 5	Active
Koreasat 5A	South Korea	KT Corporation	Communications	Ku-band	30 October 2017	Falcon 9	Known as Mugungwha 5A	Active
Koreasat 6A	South Korea	KT Corporation	Communications	20 Ku-band, 6 Ka-band	2025	Falcon 9	Known as Mugungwha 6A	Awaiting launch
Koreasat 7	South Korea	KT Corporation	Communications	30 Ku-band, 30 Ka-band	4 May 2017	Ariane 5 ECA	Known as Mugungwha 7	Active
Nilesat 201	Egypt	Nilesat	Communications	28 Ku-sat, 4 Ka-band	4 August 2010	Ariane 5 ECA		Active
Nilesat 301	Egypt	Nilesat	Communications	38 Ku-band, 6 Ka-band	8 June 2022	Falcon 9		Active
SES 22	United States	SES S.A.	Communications	C-band	29 June 2022	Falcon 9		Active
SES 23	United States	SES S.A.	Communications	C-band	202x			Awaiting launch
SICRAL 2	Italy, France	DGA	Military communications	UHF, SHF	26 April 2015	Ariane 5 ECA		Active
Telkom-3S	Indonesia	Telkom Indonesia	Television broadcasting	24 C-band, 10 Ku-band	14 February 2017	Ariane 5 ECA		Active
Merah Putih 2	Indonesia	Telkom Indonesia	Communications	C-band, Ku-band	20 February 2024	Falcon 9		Active
Thor 6	Norway	Telenor	Television broadcasting	36 Ku-band	29 October 2009	Ariane 5 ECA		Active
Türksat 3A	Turkey	Türksat	Television broadcasting	24 Ku-band	12 June 2008	Ariane 5 ECA		Active

=== Spacebus-4000B3 ===
Satellite	Country	Operator	Type	Coverage	Launch date (UTC)	Rocket	Changes	Status
Palapa-D	Indonesia	Indosat	Communications	35 C-band, 5 Ku-band	31 August 2009	Long March 3B		Retired
RASCOM-QAF 1	Africa	RascomStar-QAF	Satellite internet	12 Ku-band, 8 C-band	21 December 2007	Ariane 5GS		Retired
RASCOM-QAF 1R	Africa	RascomStar-QAF	Satellite internet	12 Ku-band, 8 C-band	4 August 2010	Ariane 5 ECA		Active
Syracuse 3A	France	DGA	Military communications	SHF, EHF	13 October 2005	Ariane 5 ECA		Active
Syracuse 3B	France	DGA	Military communications	SHF, EHF	11 August 2006	Ariane 5 ECA		Active

=== Spacebus-4000C1 ===
Satellite	Country	Operator	Type	Coverage	Launch date (UTC)	Rocket	Changes	Status
Koreasat 5	South Korea	KT Corporation, ADD	Satellite internet and military communications	24 Ku-band, 8 SHF-band, 4 Ka-band	22 August 2006	Zenit-3SL	Known as ANASIS 1	Active

=== Spacebus-4000C2 ===
Satellite	Country	Operator	Type	Coverage	Launch date (UTC)	Rocket	Changes	Status
Apstar 6	China	APT Satellite Holdings	Communications	38 C-band, 12 Ku-band	12 April 2005	Long March 3B		Retired
Apstar 7	China	APT Satellite Holdings	Communications	28 C-band, 28 Ku-band	31 March 2012	Long March 3B		Active
TürkmenÄlem 52°E / MonacoSAT	Turkmenistan, Monaco	Turkmenistan National Space Agency	Communications	38 Ku-band	27 April 2015	Falcon 9		Active
ZX 6B	China	Chinasat	Television broadcasting	38 C-band	5 July 2007	Long March 3B		Active
ZX 9	China	Chinasat	Television broadcasting	22 C-band	9 June 2008	Long March 3B		Active
ZX 12	China	Chinasat	Television broadcasting	28 C-band, 28 Ku-band	27 November 2012	Long March 3B	Known as ZX 15A	Active

=== Spacebus-4000C3 ===
Satellite	Country	Operator	Type	Coverage	Launch date (UTC)	Rocket	Changes	Status
AMC-12	United States	SES Americom	Television broadcasting	72 C-band	3 February 2005	Proton-M		Active
Eutelsat W3B	International	Eutelsat	Communications	53 Ku-band, 3 Ka-band	28 October 2010	Ariane 5 ECA		Launch failure
Eutelsat W3C	International	Eutelsat	Communications	53 Ku-band, 3 Ka-band	7 October 2011	Long March 3B	Eutelsat 16A	Active
Eutelsat 16A	International	Eutelsat	Communications	53 Ku-band, 3 Ka-band	14 May 2013	Proton-M		Active
Eutelsat 8 West B	International	Eutelsat	Communications	10 C-band, 40 Ku-band	20 August 2015	Ariane 5 ECA	Known as Nilesat 104B	Active
Eutelsat 21B	International	Eutelsat	Communications	53 Ku-band, 3 Ka-band	16 November 2012	Ariane 5 ECA		Active
Yamal-402	Russia	Gazprom Space Systems	Communications	10 C-band, 40 Ku-band	8 December 2012	Proton-M		Launch failure

=== Spacebus-4000C4 ===
Satellite	Country	Operator	Type	Coverage	Launch date (UTC)	Rocket	Changes	Status
Ciel-2	Canada	Ciel Satellite Group	Communications	32 Ku-band	10 December 2008	Proton-M		Retired
Eutelsat W7	International	Eutelsat	Communications	70 Ku-band	24 November 2009	Proton-M		Active
HellasSat 3 / Inmarsat-S-EAN	International	Inmarsat, Arabsat	Satellite internet	S-band, 44 Ku-band, 1 Ka-band	28 June 2017	Ariane 5 ECA		Active
SGDC-1	Brazil	Telebrás	Communications & military communications	50 Ka-band, 7 X-band	4 May 2017	Ariane 5 ECA		Active
Yamal-601	Russia	Gazprom Space Systems	Communications	18 C-band, 19 Ku-band, 26 Ka-band	30 May 2019	Proton-M		Active

=== Spacebus-Neo-100 ===
Satellite	Country	Operator	Type	Coverage	Launch date (UTC)	Rocket	Changes	Status
Eutelsat Konnect	International	Eutelsat	Communications	Ka-band	16 January 2020	Ariane 5 ECA		Active
Syracuse 4A	France	DGA	Communications	X-band, Ka-band	24 October 2021	Ariane 5 ECA		Active
SICRAL 3A	Italy, France	Italian Minister of Defence, DGA	Military communications	UHF, SHF	202x			Awaiting launch
SICRAL 3B	Italy, France	Italian Minister of Defence, DGA	Military communications	UHF, SHF	202x			Awaiting launch

=== Spacebus-Neo-200 ===
Satellite	Country	Operator	Type	Coverage	Launch date (UTC)	Rocket	Changes	Status
SES-17	Luxembourg	SES S.A.	Communications	Ka-band	24 October 2021	Ariane 5 ECA		Active
Eutelsat Konnect VHTS	International	Eutelsat	Communications	Ka-band	7 September 2022	Ariane 5 ECA		Active
Amazonas Nexus	Spain	Hispasat	Communications	Ku-band, Ka-band	7 February 2023	Falcon 9 Block 5		Active
Astra 1P	Luxembourg	SES S.A.	Communications	Ku-band	20 June 2024	Falcon 9 Block 5		en route to orbit
Eutelsat 10B	International	Eutelsat	Communications	2 HTS Ku-band, 36 Ku-band, 20-band	23 November 2022	Falcon 9 Block 5		Active
SATRIA-1	Indonesia	PSN	Communications	Ka-band	18 June 2023	Falcon 9 Block 5		Active

=== Space-Inspire ===
Satellite	Country	Operator	Type	Coverage	Launch date (UTC)	Rocket	Changes	Status
Arabsat 7A	Saudi Arabia	Arabsat	Communications	Reconfigurable C-Band, Ku-band	2026	Falcon 9		Awaiting launch
Astra 1Q	Luxembourg	SES	Communications	Reconfigurable Ku-band	2027			Awaiting launch
Flexsat	International	Eutelsat	Communications	Reconfigurable C-Band, Ku-band	2026			Awaiting launch
Intelsat 41	United States	Intelsat	Communications	Reconfigurable Multiband	2025	Ariane 64		Awaiting launch
Intelsat 44	United States	Intelsat	Communications	Reconfigurable Multiband	2025	Ariane 64		Awaiting launch
SES 26	Luxembourg	SES S.A.	Communications	Reconfigurable C-Band, Ku-band	202x			Awaiting launch

== Satellite cancellations ==
Type	Satellite	Country	Operator	Type	Coverage	Year	Status
Spacebus-3000B3	AMC-17	United States	SES Americom	Communications		2001	Cancelled
Spacebus-4000B3	AirTV 1	United States	AirTV	Television broadcasting	4 S-band	2000	Cancelled
Spacebus-4000B3	AirTV 2	United States	AirTV	Television broadcasting	4 S-band	2000	Cancelled
Spacebus-4000B3	AirTV 3	United States	AirTV	Television broadcasting	4 S-band	2000	Cancelled
Spacebus-4000B3	AirTV 4	United States	AirTV	Television broadcasting	4 S-band	2000	Cancelled
Spacebus-4000B3	Syracuse 3C	France	DGA	Military communications	SHF, EHF	2007	Cancelled
Spacebus-4000C3	AMC-14	United States	SES Americom	Communications		2001	Cancelled
Spacebus-4000C3	AMC-22	United States	SES Americom	Communications		2000	Cancelled
Spacebus-4000C3	AMC-23	United States	SES Americom	Communications		2002	Cancelled
Spacebus-4000C3	EuropaSat 1	International	Inmarsat	Mobile communications	S-band	2008	Cancelled
Spacebus-4000C3	Yamal 401	Russia	Gazprom Space Systems	Communications	36 Ku-band, 17 C-band	2014	Cancelled

== See also ==
- Spacebus
