= Arabsat-1B =

Saudi Arabian communications satellite

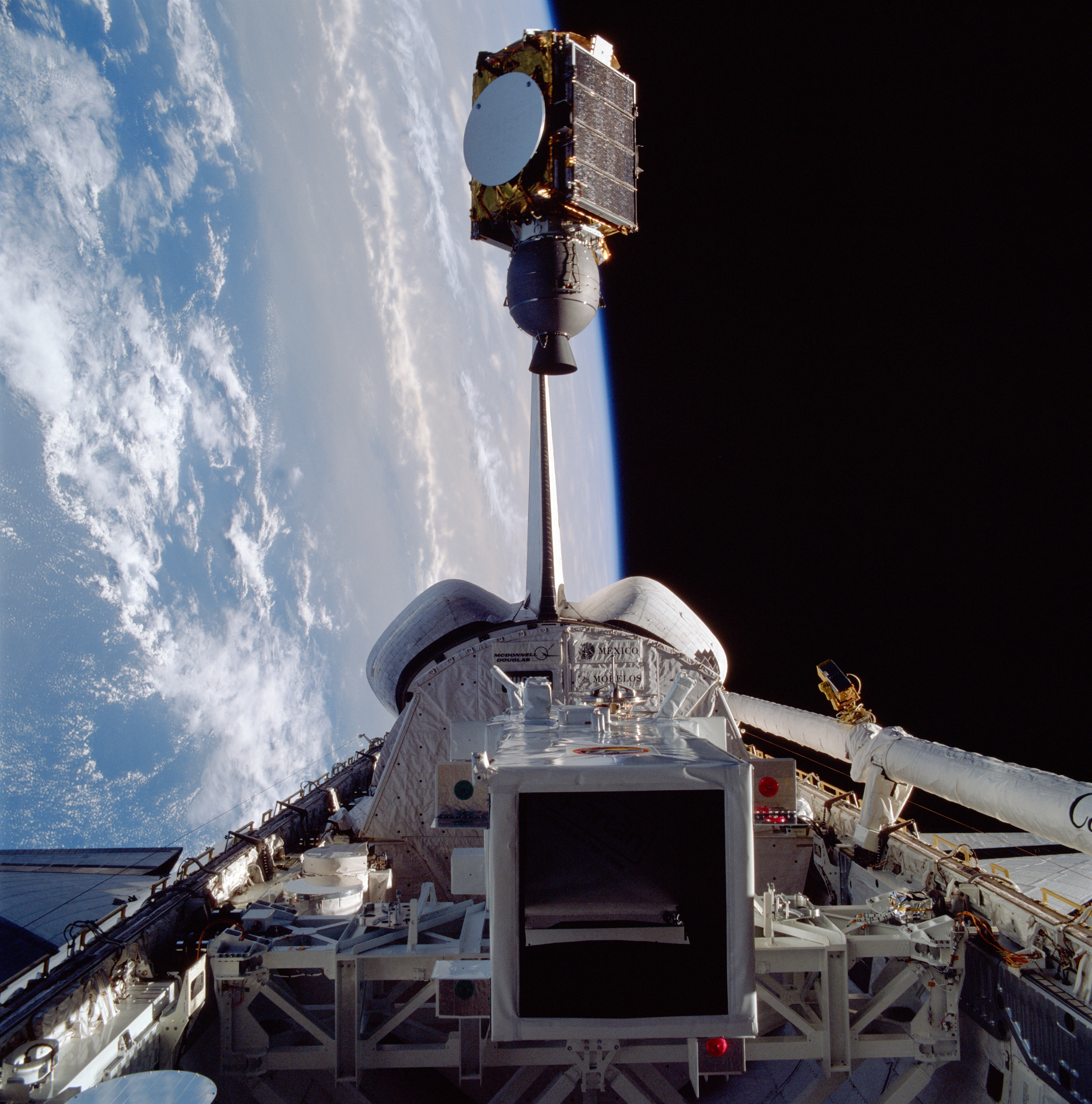
- Deployment of Arabsat-1B from STS-51-G
- Mission type: Communication
- Operator: Arabsat
- COSPAR ID: 1985-048C
- SATCAT no.: 15825
- Mission duration: 7 years

Spacecraft properties
- Bus: Spacebus 100
- Manufacturer: Aérospatiale
- Launch mass: 1,270 kilograms (2,800 lb)

Start of mission
- Launch date: 17 June 1985, 11:33:00 UTC
- Rocket: Space Shuttle Discovery; STS-51-G / PAM-D
- Launch site: Kennedy LC-39A
- Contractor: NASA

Orbital parameters
- Reference system: Geocentric
- Regime: Geostationary
- Longitude: 26° East
- Period: 24 hours

Transponders
- Band: 2 E/F-band; 25 G/H-Band

Arabsat-1B was a Saudi Arabian communications satellite which was operated by Arabsat. It was used to provide communication services to the Arab States. It was constructed by Aérospatiale, based on the Spacebus 100 satellite bus, and carried two NATO E/F-band (IEEE S band) and twenty five NATO G/H-Band (IEEE C band) transponders. At launch, it had a mass of 1,270 kilograms (2,800 lb), and an expected operational lifespan of seven years.

== History ==
Arabsat-1B was launched aboard Space Shuttle Discovery on mission STS-51-G. Discovery was launched from LC-39A at the Kennedy Space Center at 11:33:00 GMT on 17 June 1985. It was deployed from Discovery, and boosted to a geosynchronous transfer orbit by means of a PAM-D upper stage. Sultan bin Salman bin Abdulaziz Al Saud flew aboard the Shuttle to supervise deployment, becoming the first Saudi citizen and first member of royalty to fly in space. Morelos 1 and Telstar 303 were also deployed on the same mission.

Arabsat 1B was placed into a geosynchronous orbit at a longitude of 26° East. In October 1991, a problem developed with the spacecraft's attitude control system, causing it to drift eastward out of control. The same fault had developed aboard its sister satellite, Arabsat-1A, a month earlier. It failed completely in early 1992.

== See also ==
- 1985 in spaceflight
