= Comparison of satellite buses =

This page includes a list of satellite buses, of which multiple similar artificial satellites have been, or are being, built to the same model of structural frame, propulsion, spacecraft power and intra-spacecraft communication. Only commercially available (in present or past) buses are included, thus excluding series-produced proprietary satellites operated only by their makers.

== Satellite buses ==
Satellite bus	Origin	Manufacturer	Maximum Satellite Payload Mass (kg)	Total Mass (fueled bus plus sat payload) (kg)	Price (Mil US$)	Launched	Status	First flight	Last flight	Comment
A2100	United States	Lockheed Martin				56	Operational	1996	2019	GEO
Alphabus	France	Thales Alenia and EADS Astrium		6,550 kg		1	Operational	2013		Alphabus
AMOS (original)	Israel	IAI		2,000		3	Retired	2008		GEO
AMOS-4000	Israel	IAI		5,500		1	Operational	2013		GEO
Aprize	United States	SpaceQuest, Ltd.		13 kg	1.25	2	Operational	2002	2014	
ARSAT-3K	Argentina	INVAP	350 kg (770 lb)	3,000 kg (6,600 lb)	190	2	Operational	2014	2015	GEO
ATK 100	United States	ATK Space Systems and Services	15 kg	77 kg		5	Operational	2007	2007	used in THEMIS constellation only
ATK 200	United States	ATK Space Systems and Services	200 kg	573 kg		3	Operational	2000	2012	Formerly named, "Responsive Space Modular Bus";scaled-down ATK 150 option is also available
ATK 500	United States	ATK Space Systems and Services	500 kg			0	Development	2015		MEO/GEO/HEO/GSO; formerly named, "High End Modular Bus"; planned for DARPA Phoenix
ATK 700	United States	ATK Space Systems and Services	1,700 kg			0	Development			GEO/LEO/MEO/HEO/GTO; ViviSat
Ball Configurable Platform 100	United States	Ball Aerospace	70 kg	180 kg		3	Operational	1994		BCP 100
Ball Configurable Platform 300	United States	Ball Aerospace		750 kg		3	Operational	1999	2009	
Ball Configurable Platform 2000	United States	Ball Aerospace		2,200 kg		5	Operational	1999	2011	
Ball Configurable Platform 5000	United States	Ball Aerospace		2,800 kg		3	Operational	2007	2014	Used by all WorldView satellites
Boeing 601	United States	Boeing Satellite Development Center				75	Operational	1993	2014	4.8 kW standard, 10 kW for Boeing 601HP
Boeing 702	United States	Boeing Satellite Development Center				47	Operational	1999	2019	power range 3–18 kW in four sub-models
TubeSat Kit	United States	Interorbital Systems	0.5 kg	0.75 kg	0.008	0	Development			LEO
CubeSat Kit	United States	Pumpkin Inc.	1.65 kg	3 kg	0.194	23	Operational	2007	2012	LEO;
CubeSat GOMX	Denmark	GomSpace	1.50 kg	3 kg		1	Operational	2013	2013	LEO;
DFH-3	China	China Academy of Space Technology	230 kg – 450 kg	2,320 kg – 3,800 kg		47	Operational	1994	2020	
DFH-4	China	China Academy of Space Technology	800 kg – 1,000 kg	5,100 kg – 5,300 kg		41	Operational	2006	2022	
DFH-5	China	China Academy of Space Technology	1,200 kg – 2,200 kg	6,500 kg – 9,000 kg		41	Operational	2017	2022	
DS2000	Japan	MELCO		5,800 kg		9	Operational	2015		GEO
Eurostar	France, United Kingdom,	Airbus (former EADS Astrium)		6,400 kg		76	Operational	1990	2019	GEO, models E1000, E2000, E2000+, E3000
HS-333	United States	Hughes Space and Communications	54 kg	560 kg		8	Retired	1972	1979	GEO; first satellite series; 300 watt, 12-channel, single-antenna
HS-376	United States	Hughes Space and Communications		1,450 kg		58	Retired	1978	2003	GEO
HS-393	United States	Hughes Space and Communications		2,478 kg		3	Retired	1985	1990	GEO
I-1K	India	ISRO		1,425 kg		4	Operational	2002	2014	
I-2K	India	ISRO	1,400 kg	2,800 kg		20	Operational	1992	2014	DC power up to 3KW
I-3K	India	ISRO		3,460 kg		5	Operational	2005	2012	DC power up to 6.5KW
I-4K	India	ISRO		4,000 kg – 5,000 kg		0	Development	2014		DC power up to 13KW
I-6K	India	ISRO		5,000 kg – 6,500 kg		1	Operational	2018	2018	DC power up to 15KW
IMS 1	India	ISRO	30 kg	100 kg		2	Operational	2008	2011	220 W power
IMS 2	India	ISRO	200 kg	450 kg		1	Operational	2013	2013	800 W power
PSLV Orbital Experiment Module	India	ISRO	30 kg	930 kg		4	Operational	2022	2024	200 - 500 W power
SSL 1300	United States	SSL (company)		3,000–6,700 kg (approx.)		118	Operational	1984	2017	GEO; previously named the LS-1300
Modular Common Spacecraft Bus	United States	NASA Ames Research Center	50 kg	383+ kg	4.0	1	Operational	2013 LADEE		Low-cost interplanetary bus.
Photon	United States	Rocket Lab	170 kg			2	Development	2020		LEO, SSO and interplanetary versions. First operational mission, NASA's CAPSTONE mission occurred in June 2022.
RS-300	United States	Ball Aerospace		125+ kg		2	Operational (as of 2009)			RS-300
SI-100	Korea	Satrec		100 kg		0	Development			SI-100
SI-200	Korea	Satrec		200 kg		1	Operational	2009	2009	copy of RazakSAT, used in DubaiSat-1
SI-300	Korea	Satrec		300 kg		2	Operational	2013	2014	SI-200 with larger battery, used for Deimos-2 and DubaiSat-2
SNC-100	United States	SNC Space Systems	100 kg–172 kg	116 kg-277 kg		9	Operational	2006		SNC-100A (OG2), SNC-100B, SNC-100C, Trailblazer was lost in launch failure
SNC-100-L1	United States	SNC Space Systems	100 kg			0	Development			Optimized for LauncherOne
Spacebus 100	France	Aerospatiale		1,170 kg		3	Unknown	1981	1981	GEO
Spacebus 300	France	Aerospatiale	2,100 kg (approx.)			5	Retired	1987	1990	GEO
Spacebus 2000	France	Aerospatiale	1,900 kg (approx.)			11	Retired	1990	1998	GEO
Spacebus 3000	France	Aerospatiale	2,800-3200 kg (approx.)			27	Operational	1996	2010	GEO
Spacebus 4000	France	Alcatel Space – Thales Alenia Space	3,000-5700 kg (approx.)			33	Operational	2005	2019	GEO
STAR-1	United States	Orbital Sciences				1	Retired	1997	2001	GEO
STAR-2 (GEOStar-2)	United States	Orbital Sciences	500 kg	3,325 kg		33	Operational	2002	2013	GEO, 5550 W
GEOStar-3	United States	Orbital Sciences	800 kg	5,000 kg		0	Development			GEO, 8000 W
SSTL-70 (Microsat-70)	United Kingdom	Surrey Satellite Technology	30 kg	70 kg		16	Retired	1992	2001	
SSTL-100	United Kingdom	Surrey Satellite Technology	15 kg	100 kg	10.0	8	Operational	2003	2012	
SSTL-100LO	United Kingdom	Surrey Satellite Technology		100 kg		0	Development			Optimized for LauncherOne
SSTL-150	United Kingdom	Surrey Satellite Technology	50 kg	177 kg	16.5	11	Operational	2005	2014	
SSTL-300	United Kingdom	Surrey Satellite Technology	150 kg	300 kg	23.5	1	Operational	2011	2011	
SSTL-400 (Minisat-400)	United Kingdom	Surrey Satellite Technology		400 kg		1	Retired	1999	1999	
SSTL-600 Satellite Platform	United Kingdom	Surrey Satellite Technology	200 kg	600 kg	36.0	1	Operational	2005	2005	

Legend for abbreviations in the table:

- GEO – Geostationary orbit
- GSO – Geosynchronous orbit
- GTO – Geostationary transfer orbit
- HCO – Heliocentric orbit
- HEO – High Earth orbit
- LEO – Low Earth orbit
- MEO – Medium Earth orbit
- SSO – Sun-synchronous orbit
- TLI – Trans Lunar Injection
- TMI-Trans Mars Injection

== See also ==
- Category:Satellite buses
- Space tug – Spacecraft used to transfer cargo from one orbit to another
- Launch vehicle – Rocket used to carry a spacecraft into space
- Product model – Anything that can be offered to a market

== Notes ==
It is not clear from the sources if the Spacebus 100 satellite bus is still on offer.
