= Eutelsat 36B =

Communications satellite

- Names: Eutelsat W7 (2009–2012); Eutelsat 36B (2012–present)
- Mission type: Communications
- Operator: EUTELSAT
- COSPAR ID: 2009-065A
- SATCAT no.: 36101
- Mission duration: 15 years (planned); 15 years, 3 months and 10 days (in progress)

Spacecraft properties
- Spacecraft: Eutelsat W7
- Spacecraft type: Spacebus
- Bus: Spacebus-4000C4
- Manufacturer: Alcatel Alenia Space
- Launch mass: 5,627 kg (12,405 lb)
- Power: 12 kW

Start of mission
- Launch date: 24 November 2009, 14:19:10 UTC
- Rocket: Proton-M / Briz-M
- Launch site: Baikonur, Site 200/39
- Contractor: Khrunichev State Research and Production Space Center
- Entered service: January 2010

Orbital parameters
- Reference system: Geocentric orbit
- Regime: Geostationary orbit
- Longitude: 36° East

Transponders
- Band: 70 Ku-band
- Coverage area: Europe, Africa, Middle East, Russia, Central Asia

Eutelsat 36B (formerly Eutelsat W7) is a communications satellite in the W series operated by Eutelsat. It is co-located with Eutelsat 36A satellite at 36° East. It was launched on 24 November 2009, at 14:19:10 UTC, by a Proton launch vehicle.

== Description ==
Eutelsat and Alcatel Alenia Space announced in December 2006 that the two companies have signed a contract under which Alcatel Alenia Space will manufacture and deliver the Eutelsat W7 communications satellite. Manufactured by Thales Alenia Space in its Cannes Mandelieu Space Center, based on a Spacebus-4000C4 satellite bus, it features up to 70 Ku-band transponders, 12 kW of power, a weight of 5,627 kg (12,405 lb), and has a lifetime of about 17 years (2009-2026).

Eutelsat 36B is one of the most powerful spacecraft in the fleet of Eutelsat. Digital broadcasting and direct-to-home (DTH) video services is beamed to customers in Russia and Sub-Saharan Africa. The new satellite replaced all the capacity on the SESAT 1 (now Eutelsat 16C) satellite, which was redeployed to 16° East after nearly 10 years of operations at 36° East. Eutelsat 36B communications payload is connected to five downlink beams for Europe, Russia, Africa, the Middle East, and Central Asia.

Eutelsat 36B is expected to be replaced by Eutelsat 36D, currently scheduled for launch in late 2024.
