= Telstar 301 =

American communications satellite

- Names: Telstar 301 (1983–1995); Arabsat 1E (1995–1996)
- Mission type: Communication
- Operator: AT&T Corporation; Leased to Arabsat 1995–1996
- COSPAR ID: 1983-077A
- SATCAT no.: 14234
- Mission duration: 10 years

Spacecraft properties
- Bus: HS-376
- Manufacturer: Hughes
- Launch mass: 653 kilograms (1,440 lb)
- Power: 917.0 watts

Start of mission
- Launch date: 28 July 1983, 22:49 UTC
- Rocket: Delta 3920/PAM-D D171
- Launch site: Cape Canaveral LC-17A

End of mission
- Disposal: Decommissioned
- Deactivated: September 1996

Orbital parameters
- Reference system: Geocentric
- Regime: Geostationary
- Perigee altitude: 35,442 kilometres (22,023 mi)
- Apogee altitude: 36,132 kilometres (22,451 mi)
- Inclination: 0.1 degrees
- Period: 1436.11 minutes
- Epoch: 28 August 1983

Telstar 301 is an American communications satellite launched in July 1983 and operated by AT&T. It was one of three Telstar 3 satellites, followed by Telstar 302 in 1984 and Telstar 303 in 1985.

The satellite served as the east coast home satellite for the ABC network from 1984 to 1993. The CBS network also used the satellite from 1985 to 1993. It also served as the first home of Fox Broadcasting Company until the late 1980s.

Other entities that also used the satellite included Group W, Wold/Keystone Communications (which used the satellite to feed Paramount Television's syndicated output including Entertainment Tonight, Star Trek: The Next Generation, and Star Trek: Deep Space Nine), Compact Video, Lorimar-Telepictures, and Warner Bros. Television.

The satellite was retired in 1993 and replaced by Telstar 401. As of June 2009, Telstar 301 (along with Telstar 302 and Telstar 303) was still in orbit.
