= AMC-5 =

Former direct-broadcast satellite

- Names: GE-5; Nahuel-1B
- Mission type: Communications
- Operator: GE Americom (1998–2001); SES Americom (2001–2009); SES World Skies (2009–2011); SES (2011-2014)
- COSPAR ID: 1998-063B
- SATCAT no.: 25516
- Mission duration: 12 years (planned); 15 years, 6 months (achieved)

Spacecraft properties
- Spacecraft: GE-5
- Bus: Spacebus 2000
- Manufacturer: Dornier (prime contractor); Aérospatiale (bus)
- Launch mass: 1,698 kg (3,743 lb)

Start of mission
- Launch date: 28 October 1998, 22:15:00 UTC
- Rocket: Ariane 44L (V113)
- Launch site: Centre Spatial Guyanais, ELA-2
- Contractor: Arianespace

End of mission
- Disposal: Graveyard orbit
- Deactivated: 17 May 2014

Orbital parameters
- Reference system: Geocentric orbit
- Regime: Geostationary orbit
- Longitude: 79° West

Transponders
- Band: 16 Ku-band
- Coverage area: United States, Canada, Mexico

The AMC-5, originally called GE-5, was a geosynchronous direct-broadcast satellite (DBS) located at 79° West longitude, operated by SES Americom in the Ku-band. It was used by a variety of television customers, including being home to the CBS Newspath service.

The satellite was retired and moved to a graveyard orbit on 17 May 2014 after 15 years of service.

== Payload and specifications ==
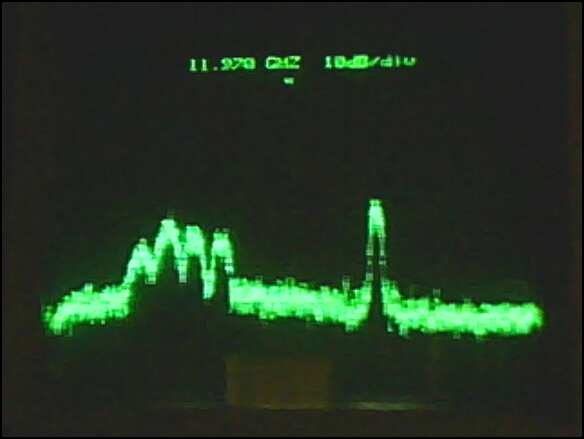
AMC-5 Horizontal Transponders On Scope

- Spacecraft design: Aérospatiale Spacebus 2000
- Orbital location: 79° West
- Launch date: 28 October 1998
- Vehicle: Ariane 44L
- Design life: 15 years
- Band: Ku-band
- Ku-band payload: 16 × 54 MHz
- Transponder type: TWTA, 55 W
- Transponder redundancy: 11 for 8
- Receiver redundancy: 4 for 2
- Coverage: United States, Canada, Mexico
