= Arabsat-5A =

Communications satellite

- Mission type: Communication
- Operator: Arabsat
- COSPAR ID: 2010-032B
- SATCAT no.: 36745
- Website: arabsat.com/pages/Arabsat5A.aspx
- Mission duration: 15 years

Spacecraft properties
- Bus: Eurostar-3000
- Manufacturer: Astrium
- Launch mass: 4,800 kilograms (10,600 lb)
- Power: 11-12 kilowatts

Start of mission
- Launch date: 26 June 2010, 21:41 UTC
- Rocket: Ariane 5ECA
- Launch site: Kourou ELA-3
- Contractor: Arianespace

Orbital parameters
- Reference system: Geocentric
- Regime: Geostationary
- Longitude: 30.5° East
- Perigee altitude: 35,779 kilometres (22,232 mi)
- Apogee altitude: 35,807 kilometres (22,249 mi)
- Inclination: 0.05 degrees
- Period: 23.93 hours
- Epoch: 24 December 2013, 06:06:12 UTC

Transponders
- Band: 16 G/H band (IEEE C band); 24 J band (IEEE K_{u} band)

Arabsat-5A is a Saudi Arabian communications satellite operated by Arabsat. It will be used to provide television, internet and telephone services to Arabia, Africa and Europe.

== History ==
Arabsat-5A was constructed by Astrium, and is based on the Eurostar-3000 satellite bus. It has a mass of 4,800 kilograms (10,600 lb), and carries forty transponders; sixteen broadcasting in the G/H band of the NATO-defined spectrum, or the C band of the IEEE-defined spectrum, and twenty four operating in the NATO J band or the IEEE K_{u} band. Its solar arrays are expected to generate around 12 kilowatts of power at the beginning of the satellite's design life, and around 11 kilowatts at the end of it.

Arabsat-5A was launched by Arianespace using an Ariane 5ECA carrier rocket lifting off from ELA-3 at the Guiana Space Centre in Kourou, French Guiana. The first attempt to launch it occurred on 23 June 2010, however the launch was scrubbed due to a problem with one of the rocket's subsystems. A subsequent attempt on 24 June was also scrubbed, due to a problem with the pressurisation of the rocket's fuel tanks. The launch occurred at 21:41 UTC on 26 June 2010. The South Korean COMS-1 satellite was launched by the same rocket, with a SYLDA adaptor being used to separate the spacecraft. Arabsat-5A was mounted atop the SYLDA, with COMS-1 underneath it.

Following launch, Arabsat-5A separated into a geosynchronous transfer orbit. It then use an apogee motor to raise itself into geostationary orbit. Once it reached geostationary orbit, it underwent testing before beginning operations at a longitude of 30.5 degrees East, where it replaced Arabsat-2B. It is expected to operate for fifteen years.
