= Eutelsat 16C =

Communications satellite

- Names: SESAT-1 (2000–2012); Eutelsat 16C (2012–2018); Eutelsat SESAT
- Mission type: Communications
- Operator: Eutelsat Communications
- COSPAR ID: 2000-019A
- SATCAT no.: 26243
- Website: https://www.eutelsat.com/en/home.html
- Mission duration: 10 years (planned); 17.8 years (achieved)

Spacecraft properties
- Spacecraft: SESAT-1
- Spacecraft type: KAUR
- Bus: MSS-2500-GSO
- Manufacturer: NPO PM; Alcatel Alenia Space
- Launch mass: 2,500 kg (5,500 lb)
- Power: 5.6 kW

Start of mission
- Launch date: 17 April 2000, 21:06:00 UTC
- Rocket: Proton-K / DM-2M
- Launch site: Baikonur, Site 200/39
- Contractor: Khrunichev State Research and Production Space Center
- Entered service: June 2000

End of mission
- Disposal: Graveyard orbit
- Deactivated: 13 February 2018

Orbital parameters
- Reference system: Geocentric orbit
- Regime: Geostationary orbit
- Longitude: 36° East (2000–2010); 16° East (2010–2018)

Transponders
- Band: 18 Ku-band
- Bandwidth: 72 MHz
- Coverage area: Europe, Africa, Russia

Eutelsat 16C (formerly SESAT 1) was a satellite operated by Eutelsat Communications, originally the first of a series of SESAT (Siberia - Europe SATellite) satellites. It provided a wide range of telecommunications services over a very large geographical coverage area that extends from the Atlantic Ocean to Eastern Russia, including a large part of Siberia. The satellite also provided broadcasting services to Africa by means of steerable spotbeams.

On 29 January 2010, the satellite moved to 16° East to take over some services from the malfunctioning Eutelsat W2 satellite. The satellite was deactivated on 13 February 2018, after 17 years and 10 months of service, setting a record for in-orbit life.
