= INSAT-2DT =

Decommissioned Indian geostationary communications satellite

Arabsat-1C → INSAT-2DT
- Mission type: Communication
- Operator: Arabsat → INSAT
- COSPAR ID: 1992-010B
- SATCAT no.: 21894
- Mission duration: 7 years (planned); 12¾ years (achieved)

Spacecraft properties
- Bus: Spacebus 100
- Manufacturer: Aérospatiale/MBB
- Launch mass: 1,360 kilograms (3,000 lb)

Start of mission
- Launch date: 26 February 1992, 23:58:10 UTC
- Rocket: Ariane 44L
- Launch site: Kourou ELA-2
- Contractor: Arianespace

End of mission
- Disposal: Decommissioned
- Deactivated: October 2004

Orbital parameters
- Reference system: Geocentric
- Regime: Geostationary
- Longitude: 31° East; 55° East; 82.5° East
- Period: 24 hours

Transponders
- Band: 2 E/F-band; 25 G/H-Band

INSAT-2DT, previously Arabsat-1C and also known as INSAT-2R, was a Saudi Arabian and subsequently Indian communications satellite which was operated initially by Arabsat, and then by the Indian National Satellite System.

== Launch and Arabsat service ==
Launched in 1992 as Arabsat-1C, it was operated at 31° East longitude in geostationary orbit, from where it was used to provide communication services to the Arab States. It was constructed by Aérospatiale, based on the Spacebus 100 satellite bus, and carried two NATO E/F-band (IEEE S band) and 25 NATO G/H-Band (IEEE C band) transponders. At launch, it had a mass of 1,170 kilograms (2,580 lb), and an expected operational lifespan of seven years.

It was launched by Arianespace using an Ariane 4 rocket in the 44L configuration, flying from ELA-2 at the Guiana Space Centre in Kourou. The launch took place at 22:58:10 UTC on 26 February 1992. It was the final Spacebus 100 satellite to be launched.

== Indian operations ==
In November 1997, Arabsat-1C was sold to India as INSAT-2DT. In December, it was moved to a new slot at 55°E longitude, where it replaced the INSAT-2D satellite which had failed in orbit. It remained at 55°E until August 2003, when it was moved to 85.2°E, arriving in November. By the time of its departure from 55°E, its orbital inclination had increased somewhat.

INSAT-2DT remained at 85.2°E until October 2004, when it was retired from service and placed into a graveyard orbit.

== See also ==
- 1992 in spaceflight
