= Telstar 303 =

Communications satellite launched in 1985

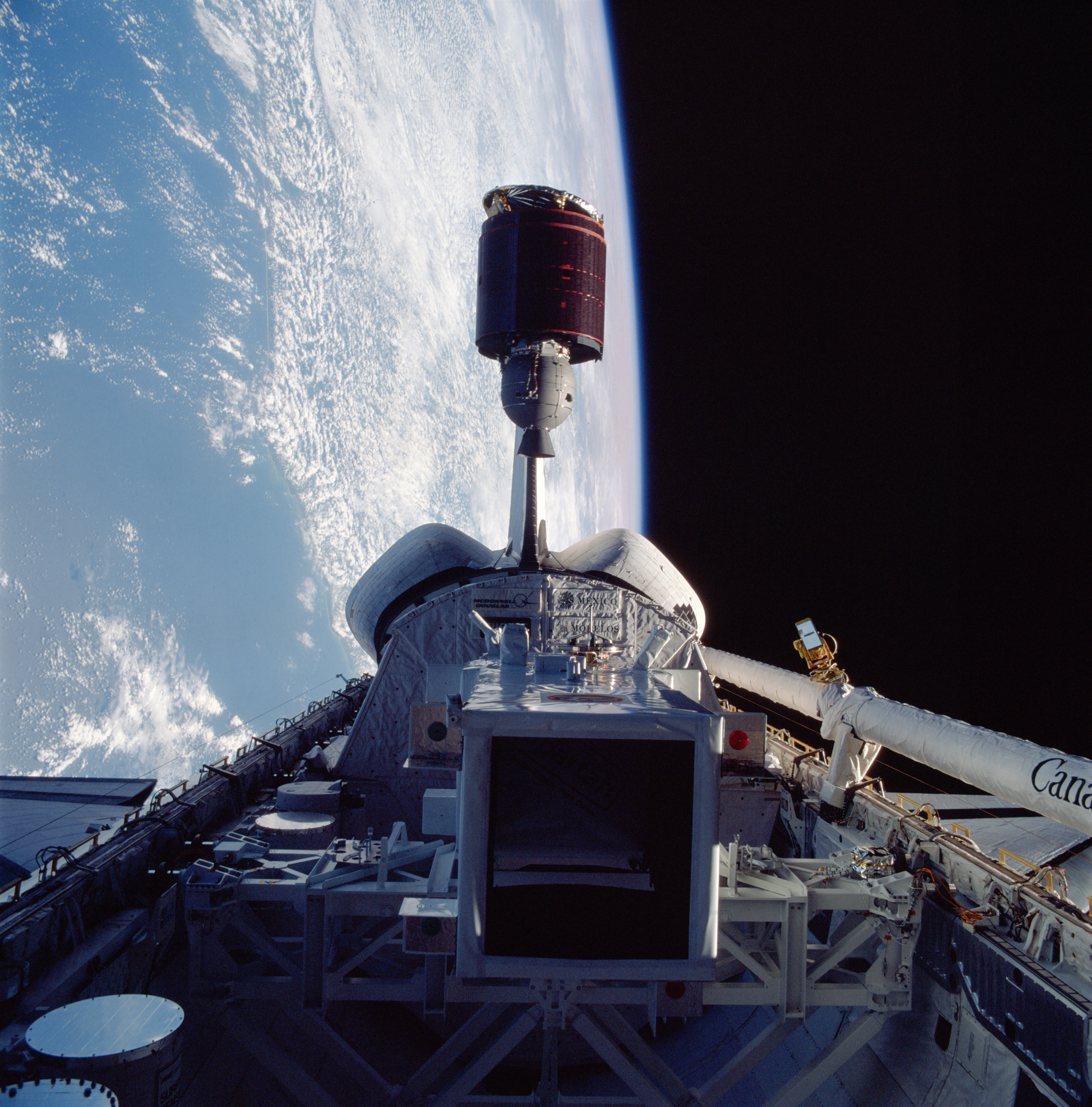
- Telstar 303 satellite in orbit
- Mission type: Communications satellite
- Operator: AT&T → Loral Skynet
- COSPAR ID: 1985-048D
- SATCAT no.: 15826
- Mission duration: 10 years (planned)

Spacecraft properties
- Bus: HS-376
- Manufacturer: Hughes Communications
- Launch mass: 1,140 kg (2,510 lb)
- BOL mass: 653 kg (1,440 lb)

Start of mission
- Launch date: 17 June 1985, 11:33:00 UTC
- Rocket: Space Shuttle Discovery
- Launch site: John F. Kennedy Space Center, LC-39A
- Contractor: Rockwell International

End of mission
- Disposal: Graveyard orbit
- Deactivated: 1999

Orbital parameters
- Reference system: Geocentric orbit
- Regime: Geostationary orbit
- Longitude: 125° West

Transponders
- Band: C-band
- Coverage area: North America, Hawaii, Puerto Rico

Telstar 303 is a U.S. communications satellite launched from Space Shuttle Discovery during STS-51-G on 17 June 1985. Owned by AT&T and operated by Loral Skynet Hughes Communications, it was one of three Telstar 3 satellites, preceded by Telstar 301 in 1983 and Telstar 302 in 1984.

== Description ==
The satellite served as the U.S. west coast and mid-west home satellite (C-band) with 48 transponders for the ABC network from 1984 to 1993. The CBS network used the satellite from 1985 to 1993. It also served as telephone call transfer for remote areas until 1993.

Other entities that used the satellite included Group W, Wold/Keystone Communications (which used the satellite to feed Paramount Television's syndicated output including Entertainment Tonight, Star Trek: The Next Generation, and Star Trek: Deep Space Nine), Compact Video, Lorimar-Telepictures, and Warner Bros. Television.

In 1987, Melvin Rosen and Stuart Levin acquired 17 transponders on Telstar 303 satellite for the purpose of creating the first and largest multi-channel pay-per-view satellite TV system to serve the C-band satellite TV market. In 1993, as the satellite was about to retire, a group of business owners including General Instruments, TVN Entertainment, Parallex Data Systems, and Enterprises put together programs systems and home units to bring affordable IPPV (Impulse-Pay-Per-View) and PPV (Pay-per-view) entertainment to the home. Acquiring Telstar 303 required moving it from 125° to 104° West and a little changing of internal code to extend battery life and accept its new job parameters.

The satellite was retired in 1999 and replaced by Telstar 401. All three of the Telstar 4 series satellite met with disaster, and are still in orbit in a graveyard orbit.
