= TV-SAT 1 =

Decommissioned West German communication satellite

- Names: TVSAT-1
- Mission type: Communication
- Operator: Deutsche Bundespost
- COSPAR ID: 1987-095A
- SATCAT no.: 18570
- Website: https://www.telekom.com/en
- Mission duration: 8 years (planned); Failed on orbit

Spacecraft properties
- Spacecraft type: Spacebus
- Bus: Spacebus 300
- Manufacturer: Eurosatellite (Aérospatiale) and Messerschmitt-Bölkow-Blohm (MBB)
- Launch mass: 2,144 kg (4,727 lb)
- Dimensions: 2.4 x 1.64 x 6.4 m
- Power: 4.5 kW

Start of mission
- Launch date: 21 November 1987, 02:19:00 UTC
- Rocket: Ariane 2 (V20)
- Launch site: Centre Spatial Guyanais, Kourou, ELA-2
- Contractor: Arianespace
- Entered service: Failed on orbit

End of mission
- Disposal: Graveyard orbit
- Deactivated: February 1988

Orbital parameters
- Reference system: Geocentric orbit
- Regime: Geostationary orbit
- Longitude: 19.2° West

Transponders
- Band: 5 Ku-Band
- Bandwidth: 27 MHz
- Coverage area: Europe, Germany

TV-SAT 1 or TVSAT-1 was a West German communications satellite, which was to have been operated by Deutsche Bundespost. It was intended to provide television broadcast services to Europe, but it failed before entering service. It was built by Aérospatiale, was based on the Spacebus 300 satellite bus, and carried five Ku-band transponders. At launch it had a mass of 2,144 kg (4,727 lb), and an expected operational lifespan of eight years.

== Launch ==
TV-SAT 1 was launched by Arianespace using an Ariane 2 rocket flying from ELA-2 at Centre Spatial Guyanais, Kourou, French Guiana. The launch took place at 02:19:00 UTC on 21 November 1987. It was the first Spacebus 300 satellite to be launched. Immediately after launch, one of its solar panels failed to deploy, so that the main uplink antenna, behind the solar panel, could not deploy either. This failure was caused by the presence of two hold-down bolts, which should have been removed before launch.

== Mission ==
Despite the failure, TV-SAT 1 was placed into a geostationary orbit at a longitude of 19.2° West. It was briefly used for a series of tests to verify the satellite's systems, before it was retired to a graveyard orbit in February 1988.

TV-Sat 2 followed on 8 August 1989.

== See also ==
- 1987 in spaceflight
