= Badr-4 =

- Mission type: Communication
- Operator: Arabsat
- COSPAR ID: 2006-051A
- SATCAT no.: 29526

Spacecraft properties
- Manufacturer: EADS Astrium; Thales Alenia Space
- Launch mass: 3,341 kilograms (7,366 lb)
- Power: 12.5 watts

Start of mission
- Launch date: 8 November 2006
- Rocket: Proton-M/Briz-M
- Launch site: Baikonur 200/39
- Contractor: ILS

Orbital parameters
- Reference system: Geocentric
- Regime: Geostationary
- Longitude: 26.0º East
- Period: 24 hours

Badr-4 (a.k.a. Arabsat 4B) is an EADS Astrium-built communications satellite operated by Arabsat, launched 8 November 2006 on a Proton-M/Briz-M rocket. It provides fixed satellite communications services in C- and K_{u}-bands from the 26° East orbital position.

The satellite is based on the Eurostar E2000+ platform. Its payload was supplied by Alcatel Alenia Space. The Badr-4-payload consists of 28 active channels in K_{u} band (16 in BSS and 12 in FSS). Payload power is about 6 kW. The satellite has two 2.5 m deployable antennas and one 1.35 m top floor antenna.

Due to success of the satellite, Arabsat let another agreement for an upgraded version of Badr-4 communication satellite: in June 2006, Arabsat gave the contract to EADS Astrium for construction of Badr-6, a high-power broadcast satellite to cover the Middle East and Africa. Badr-6 was launched by an Ariane 5 on 7 July 2008.

== Description ==
This satellite carries 32 transponders in K_{u} band/FSS & K_{u} band/BSS. The spacecraft utilizes Astrium's Eurostar E2000+ platform to carry 22 C-band transponders (including eight 52 W moderate power transponders) and 12 K_{u} band transponders.
