= King Fahd Satellite Telecommunications City =

Satellite communications facility in Saudi Arabia

- Established: 1988
- Research type: Satellite ground station
- Location: Makkah Region, Saudi Arabia; 21°23′50.30″N 39°22′59.00″E
- Operating agency: Arab Satellite Communications Organization

The King Fahd Satellite Telecommunications City is a satellite communications facility located between Mecca and Jeddah in Saudi Arabia. The facility is the control center for the Arab Satellite Communications Organization, one of the largest SATCOM operators in the Middle East/North Africa region. Named after King Fahd who ruled Saudi Arabia from 1982 to 2005, the facility was established in 1988 and consists of four ground stations. It is situated right off the Mecca-Jeddah Road.
