= Eutelsat 12 West B =

Communications satellite

- Names: Atlantic Bird 2 (2001–2012); Eutelsat 8 West A (2012–2015)
- Mission type: Communications
- Operator: Eutelsat
- COSPAR ID: 2001-042A
- SATCAT no.: 26927
- Website: www.eutelsat.com/en/home.html
- Mission duration: 12 years (planned); 19 years (achieved)

Spacecraft properties
- Spacecraft: Atlantic Bird 2
- Spacecraft type: Spacebus
- Bus: Spacebus-3000B2
- Manufacturer: Alcatel Space
- Launch mass: 3,150 kg (6,940 lb)
- Dry mass: 1,368 kg (3,016 lb)

Start of mission
- Launch date: 21 September 2001, 23:21 UTC
- Rocket: Ariane 44P H10-3 (V144)
- Launch site: Centre Spatial Guyanais, ELA-2
- Contractor: Arianespace
- Entered service: November 2001

End of mission
- Disposal: Graveyard orbit
- Deactivated: October 2020

Orbital parameters
- Reference system: Geocentric orbit
- Regime: Geostationary orbit
- Longitude: 8° West (2001–2015); 12.5° West (2015–2020)

Transponders
- Band: 26 Ku-band
- Coverage area: Americas, Europe

Eutelsat 12 West B, known as Atlantic Bird 2 prior to 2012 and Eutelsat 8 West A from 2012 to 2015, was a geostationary communications satellite. Operated by Eutelsat, it provides direct-to-home (DTH) broadcasting services from geostationary orbit. The satellite is part of Eutelsat constellation at a longitude of 8° West, then 12.5° West. Eutelsat announced the order of a new Spacebus-3000B2 satellite bus from Alcatel Space in October 2012.

== Satellite description ==
Atlantic Bird 2 was a 3,150 kg (6,940 lb) satellite with a design life of 12 years. It is equipped with an S400-12 apogee motor which was used for initial orbit-raising manoeuvres and an S10-18 engine for station keeping burns. The spacecraft has 26 Ku-band transponders.

== Launch ==
Atlantic Bird 2 was launched on the Ariane 44P launch vehicles from Centre Spatial Guyanais at the Kourou in French Guiana. Liftoff occurred at 23:21 UTC on 21 September 2001, with the launch vehicle successfully injecting its payload into geosynchronous transfer orbit (GTO). The launch was conducted by Arianespace.

== Mission ==
Following launch, the satellite Atlantic Bird 2 used its apogee motor to raise itself into geostationary orbit, positioning itself at a longitude of 8° West. In December 2011, Eutelsat announced, that their satellite assets will be renamed under a unified brand name effective from March 2012. This satellite became Eutelsat 8 West A at 8° West. In 2015, it was moved to 12.5° West and named Eutelsat 12 West B. It has been moved to a graveyard orbit in October 2020.
