= Arab Satellite Communications Organization =

Arab satellite operator

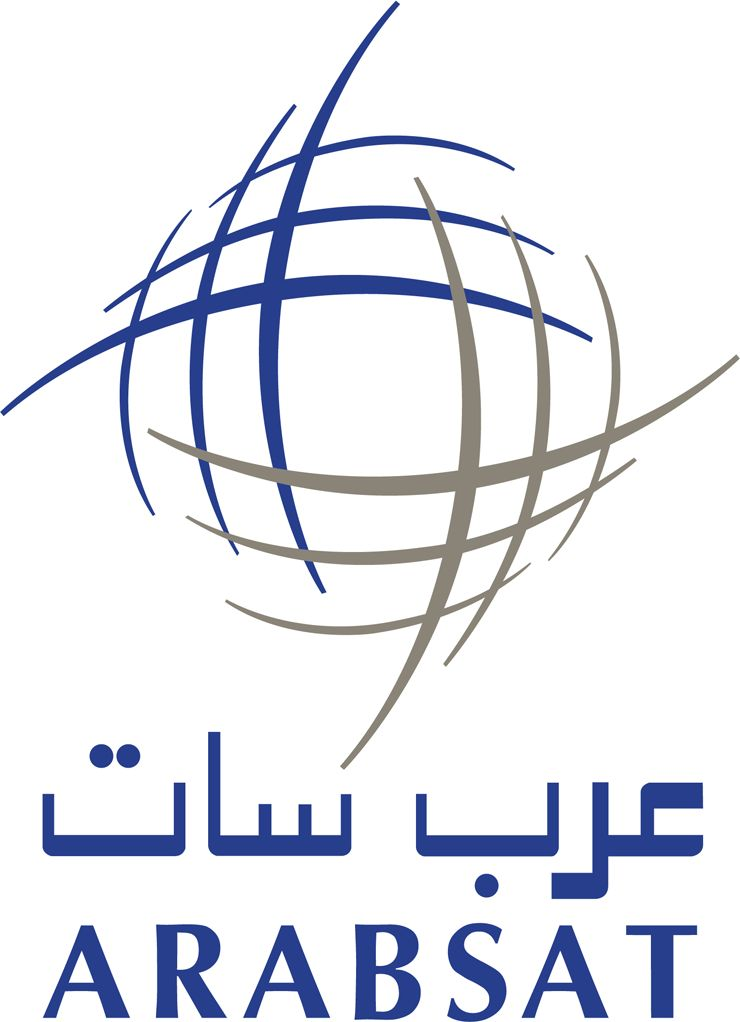
- Industry: Satellite communications
- Founded: 1976
- Headquarters: Riyadh, Saudi Arabia
- Website: www.arabsat.com

The Arab Satellite Communications Organization (often abbreviated as Arabsat) is a communications satellite operator in the Arab world, headquartered in the city of Riyadh, Saudi Arabia. Arabsat was created to deliver satellite-based, public and private telecommunications services to the Arab States, in accordance with International Standards. With 21 member countries, the organization plays a vital role of enhancing communications in the Arab World.

The Arabsat satellites are a series of geostationary communications satellites launched from 1985 through 2019. Some of the later satellites in the series remain operational in orbit, while others have been retired and are derelict.

== History ==
The foundation of Arab Satellite Communications Organization (Arabsat) dates from the late 1960s. In 1967, information ministers of Arab states developed a series of principles in relation to a satellite network, to create an integration of social and cultural activities among the Arab League countries. On the other hand, the Arab States Broadcasting Union (ASBU) was established in 1969. Saudi Arabia did not join this Egypt-led and Cairo-based union until 1974, most probably due to the tense relationship between Saudi Arabia and Egypt at the time.

On 14 April 1976, Arabsat was formed under Arab League jurisdiction with the goal of serving the information, cultural and educational needs of its member states. Saudi Arabia was the main financier of the new organization due to its expanded financial resources as a result of its flourishing oil-exporting industry. Riyadh housed Arabsat's headquarters.

The first launch Arabsat-1A was performed by a French Ariane rocket. The American Space Shuttle Discovery launched Arabsat's second satellite, Arabsat-1B, in 1985. Arabsat-1A and -1B were switched off in 1992 and 1993, respectively.

== Shareholders ==
Arab League members and Arabsat shareholders

All Arab League states except for Comoros are shareholders of Arabsat:

- Saudi Arabia 36.7%
- Kuwait 14.6%
- Libya 11.3%
- Qatar 9.8%
- United Arab Emirates 4.7%
- Jordan 4%
- Lebanon 3.8%
- Bahrain 2.5%
- Syria 2.1%
- Iraq 1.9%
- Algeria 1.7%
- Yemen 1.7%
- Egypt 1.6%
- Oman 1.2%
- Tunisia 0.7%
- Morocco 0.6%
- Sudan 0.3%
- Mauritania 0.3%
- Palestine 0.2%
- Somalia 0.2%
- Djibouti 0.1%

== Satellites ==
Satellite	Launch Date	Launch site	Launcher	Mass	Status	Note
(Saudi Arabia) Arabsat-1A	8 February 1985	(European Union) ELA-1 Guiana Space Centre	(European Union) Ariane 3		Decommissioned	
(Saudi Arabia) Arabsat-1B	17 June 1985	(United States) LC-39A Kennedy Space Center	(United States) Space Shuttle/PAM-D		Decommissioned	
(Saudi Arabia) Arabsat-1C	26 February 1992	(European Union) ELA-2 Guiana Space Centre	(European Union) Ariane-44LP H10		Decommissioned	
(Saudi Arabia) Arabsat-1D	8 November 1984	(United States) LC-39A Kennedy Space Center	(United States) Space Shuttle/PAM-D		Decommissioned	
(Saudi Arabia) Arabsat-1E	28 July 1983	(United States) SLC-17A Cape Canaveral	(United States) Delta 3920/PAM-D		Decommissioned	
(Saudi Arabia) Arabsat-2A	9 July 1996	(European Union) ELA-2 Guiana Space Centre	(European Union) Ariane-44LP H10-3		Decommissioned	
(Saudi Arabia) Arabsat-2B	13 November 1996	(European Union) ELA-2 Guiana Space Centre	(European Union) Ariane-44LP H10-3		Decommissioned	
(Saudi Arabia) Arabsat-2C (Badr C)	28 August 1997	(Kazakhstan) Site 81/23 Baikonur Cosmodrome	(Russia) Proton-K/DM-03		Decommissioned	
(Saudi Arabia) Arabsat-2D (Badr-2)	9 October 1998	(United States) SLC-36B Cape Canaveral	(United States) Atlas-2A		Decommissioned	
(Saudi Arabia) Arabsat-3A (Badr-3)	26 February 1999	(European Union) ELA-2 Guiana Space Centre	(European Union) Ariane-44LP H10-3		Decommissioned	
(Saudi Arabia) Arabsat-4A (Badr-1)	28 February 2006	(Kazakhstan) Site 200/39 Baikonur Cosmodrome	(Russia) Proton-M/Briz-M		Failed	
(Saudi Arabia) Arabsat-4B (Badr-4)	8 November 2006	(Kazakhstan) Site 200/39 Baikonur Cosmodrome	(Russia) Proton-M/Briz-M		In Service	
(Saudi Arabia) Arabsat-4AR (Badr-6)	7 July 2008	(European Union) ELA-3 Guiana Space Centre	(European Union) Ariane 5 ECA		In Service	Replacement Satellite for Arabsat- 4A
(Saudi Arabia) Arabsat-5A	26 June 2010	(European Union) ELA-3 Guiana Space Centre	(European Union) Ariane 5 ECA		In Service	
(Saudi Arabia) Arabsat-5B (Badr-5)	3 June 2010	(Kazakhstan) Site 200/39 Baikonur Cosmodrome	(Russia) Proton-M/Briz-M		In Service	
(Saudi Arabia) Arabsat-5C	21 September 2011	(European Union) ELA-3 Guiana Space Centre	(European Union) Ariane 5 ECA		In Service	
(Saudi Arabia) Arabsat-6A	11 April 2019	(United States) LC-39A Kennedy Space Center	(United States) Falcon Heavy		In Service	
(Saudi Arabia) Arabsat-6B (Badr-7)	10 November 2015	(European Union) ELA-3 Guiana Space Centre	(European Union) Ariane 5 ECA		In Service	
(Saudi Arabia) Arabsat-6C	TBA	(United States) TBA	(United States) TBA		Planned	
(Saudi Arabia) Arabsat-6D	TBA	(United States) TBA	(United States) TBA		Planned	
(Saudi Arabia) Arabsat-6E	TBA	(United States) TBA	(United States) TBA		Planned	
(Saudi Arabia) Arabsat-7A	2026	(United States) SLC-40 Cape Canaveral	(United States) Falcon 9 Block 5		Planned	
(Saudi Arabia) Arabsat-7B (Badr-8)	27 May 2023	(United States) SLC-40 Cape Canaveral	(United States) Falcon 9 Block 5		In Service	

=== Arabsat-1 ===
Arabsat-1 was the model designator for a series of first-generation satellites built by an international team led by Aérospatiale of France. It is a satellite with three-axis stabilized Spacebus 100 spacecraft with two deployable solar array wings, making it almost 68 ft (21 m) long and over 18 ft (5.5 m) wide when deployed in orbit. It weighs about 2,800 lb (1,300 kg) in its initial orbit, but some 1,490 lb (680 kg) of this is propellant. It has an onboard low-thrust motor that utilizes hydrazine and nitrogen tetroxide, and transfers from an initial elliptical to geosynchronous orbit by firing this motor. The remaining propellant is then used for station-keeping or moving over the life of the satellite.

Arabsat-1A, the first Arabsat satellite, was launched by Ariane on 8 February 1985. Shortly after launch it suffered a solar panel extension malfunction. Coupled with other failures, the satellite was soon relegated to backup status until it was abandoned completely in late 1991.

Arabsat-1B, the second flight model, was deployed in June 1985, from the Space Shuttle Discovery on mission STS-51-G, and placed into service near 26.0° east, and remained in operation until mid-1992.

Arabsat-1C, the third satellite of the series, was launched by Ariane on 26 February 1992, as a stop-gap measure to maintain network services until the Arabsat second generation spacecraft became available.

Arabsat-1D, was renamed from the Anik-D2 (a Hughes HS-376 bus originally carrying 24 active C-band transponders).

=== Arabsat-2 ===
By the end of 1994, the Arabsat system had been reduced to only one operational satellite. A contract for two Arabsat second-generation satellites was signed with Aérospatiale in April 1993, to build several additional comsats based on the Spacebus 3000A platform.

Arabsat-2A, was launched on 9 July 1996.

Arabsat-2B, was launched on 13 November 1996.

Arabsat-2C was leased from PAS-5 in May 2002 and moved from the Western Hemisphere during November 2002 to a position at 26.0° E.

Arabsat-2D was leased from Hot Bird 5 and moved from the position 13.0° E during November 2002 to a position at 26.0° E.

=== Arabsat-3 ===
On 7 November 1996, a contract was signed with Aérospatiale (Alcatel) to provide the first of the third-generation satellites, to be based on a Spacebus 3000B2 platform.

Badr-3 (technically: Arabsat-3A), weighed 2,708 kilograms (5,970 lb) (at launch) and 1,646 kilograms (3,629 lb) (in orbit), was launched by a launcher Ariane-44L (# 28) (V-116) from ELA-2 at Centre Spatial Guyanais at 26.0° East with a lifespan of 15 years, as the first satellite of the third generation, on 26 February 1999 at 22:44:00 UTC. Half of its 20 transponders K_{u} were switched off on 7 December 2001 after a solar-panel malfunction.

=== Arabsat-4 ===
Arabsat let a contract on 22 October 2003 for the manufacture and launch of the fourth generation of Arabsat satellites, based on the Astrium's Eurostar E2000+ platform and Alcatel Space payload. The first of these, Arabsat-4A, was lost in space due to a launcher failure. This led to the ordering of Badr-6 (technically: Arabsat-4AR) on 31 May 2006. The second fourth generation satellite, named Badr-4 (technically: Arabsat-4B), was launched on 8 November 2006. BADR-6 was launched on 7 July 2008 on an Ariane 5, to replace the lost Arabsat-4A.

=== Arabsat-5 ===
Arabsat let a contract on 16 June 2007 for the manufacture and launch of the fifth generation of Arabsat satellites, based on the Astrium's Eurostar E3000 platform and Thales Alenia Space payloads:

- The first of the fifth-generation satellites, named Badr-5 (technically: Arabsat-5B), was launched by Proton at Arabsat's 26.0° East Direct-to-Home television "Hot Spot" on 3 June 2010.
- The second of the fifth-generation satellites, Arabsat-5A, was launched by Ariane at the 30.5° East orbital location on 26 June 2010.
- The third of the fifth-generation satellites, Arabsat-5C, was launched to the new 20.0° East orbital location on 21 September 2011, on an Ariane 5.

=== Arabsat-6 ===
- Badr-7 (Arabsat-6B) was launched successfully in tandem with GSat-15 on 10 November 2015 from the Spaceport in Kourou, French Guiana, atop an Ariane 5 launcher.
- The launch of Arabsat-6A with a Falcon Heavy rocket was on 11 April 2019.

=== Arabsat-7 ===
Arabsat signed a contract on 29 April 2022 with Europe's Thales Alenia Space, which will build the Arabsat 7A satellite based on its Space Inspire platform. The satellite is Arabsat's first fully software-defined geostationary satellite and will provide coverage across the Middle East, Africa and parts of Europe. It is expected to replace most of the existing C and Ku-band capacity at 30.5 East that is provided by Arabsat 5A and is approaching end-of-life.

Arabsat 7B (Badr 8) launched on a Falcon 9 on May 27, 2023.

== Controversies ==
In July 2019, some of the biggest football authorities that control the Premier League, World Cup and Champions League, called on the Kingdom of Saudi Arabia to stop its homegrown piracy of TV and streaming service, illicitly broadcasting matches globally via Arabsat. Saudi was strongly criticized in a letter issued by sports bodies including, FIFA, UEFA, Spain's La Liga, Germany's Bundesliga and Italy's Serie A along with the Asian Football Confederation. The letter was issued after 18 months of failed efforts at legally challenging Saudi Arabia to block beoutQ for pirate broadcasting the entire World Cup 2018. The authorities said in a joint statement, "We collectively condemn in the strongest possible terms the ongoing theft of our intellectual property by the pirate broadcaster known as beoutQ and call on the authorities in Saudi Arabia to support us in ending the widespread and flagrant breaches of our intellectual property rights".

The sporting bodies have also accused nine Saudi Arabian legal firms of not taking on their copyright infringement case, following which the authorities are seeking to adopt other means for the shut down of the state-run broadcaster.

== Services ==
- Direct To Home (DTH) television broadcasting
- Broadband and Telephony backbone connectivity
- Satellite Internet
- VSATs

== Fleet ==
In January 2023, Arabsat owned eight operational satellites, at three orbital positions: 20° East, 26° East and 30.5° East.

- Arabsat-5C (20° E)
- Badr-4/Arabsat-4B (26° E)
- Badr-5/Arabsat-5B (26° E)
- Badr-6/Arabsat-4AR (26° E)
- Badr-7/Arabsat-6B (26° E)
- Arabsat-5A (30.5° E)
- Arabsat-6A (30.5° E)
- Arabsat-7B (Badr-8)

=== Planned Launches ===
- Arabsat-7A scheduled 2026

== See also ==
- Economy of the Arab League
- King Fahd Satellite Telecommunications City
