= Koreasat 5 =

South Korea's satellite launched in 2006

- Names: ANASIS-I; Mugungwha 5
- Mission type: Military Communications
- Operator: KT Corporation, Agency for Defense Development (ADD)
- COSPAR ID: 2006-034A
- SATCAT no.: 29349
- Mission duration: 15 years (planned); 19 years, 8 months and 25 days (in progress)

Spacecraft properties
- Bus: Spacebus-4000C1
- Manufacturer: Alcatel Alenia Space
- Launch mass: 4465 kg

Start of mission
- Launch date: 22 August 2006, 03:27:01 UTC
- Rocket: Zenit-3SL
- Launch site: Ocean Odyssey, Pacific Ocean near Kiritimati
- Contractor: Sea Launch

Orbital parameters
- Reference system: Geocentric orbit
- Regime: Geostationary orbit
- Longitude: 113° E

Koreasat 5 (also known as ANASIS-I (Army Navy Air Force Satellite Information System-I) and Mugunghwa 5 (무궁화 5호)) is a South Korean communications satellite operated by Koreasat.

== See also ==
Korea Aerospace Research Institute (KARI)
