= Regional African Satellite Communication Organization =

Organization which provides telecommunications services to rural Africa

- Abbreviation: RASCOM
- Purpose: To provide telecommunication services, direct TV broadcast services and Internet access in rural areas of Africa

The Regional African Satellite Communication Organization (RASCOM) will provide telecommunication services, direct TV broadcast services and Internet access in rural areas of Africa. Under an agreement with RASCOM, RascomStar-QAF (a private company registered in Mauritius) will implement RASCOM's first 14 communications satellite project. This joint African project is expected to lower the continent's dependency on international satellite networks such as Intelsat.

== RASCOM-QAF1 ==
RASCOM-QAF1 is the first satellite entirely dedicated to the African continent. Thales Alenia Space built the satellite in the Cannes Mandelieu Space Center, France. The company has delivered the satellite in-orbit, and will supply the ground infrastructure needed to operate it. The spacecraft is based on the Spacebus 4000B3 platform, with a payload of twelve Ku-band transponders and eight C-band transponders. It weighed about 3,200 kilograms (7,100 lb) at launch.

Launch aboard an Ariane 5GS rocket took place on 2007-12-21. On 2007-12-29 Thales Alenia Space announced that a helium leak aboard the spacecraft would delay its activation. On 2008-01-08 the company announced the perigee of the satellite's orbit would be raised, and also acknowledged that if the satellite eventually reached geostationary orbit its useful lifetime would be significantly reduced. On 2008-02-04 Thales Alenia Space announced the satellite had reached its intended geostationary orbit at 2.85° East. They expect its lifetime to be slightly over 2 years.

== RASCOM-QAF1R ==
On 2008-09-09 Thales Alenia Space announced it would supply RASCOMSTAR-QAF with a new satellite which will provide continuity of service for RASCOMSTAR-QAF customers. Like RASCOM-QAF1, RASCOM-QAF1R will be based on the Spacebus 4000 B3 platform and will be fitted with twelve Ku-band and eight C-band transponders. Launch aboard an Ariane 5 ECA occurred on August 4, 2010.
