= AMC-9 =

Broadcast communications satellite

- Names: GE-12; AMC-9 (2003-present)
- Mission type: Communications
- Operator: SES Americom (2003-2009); SES World Skies (2009-2011); SES S.A. (2011-2017)
- COSPAR ID: 2003-024A
- SATCAT no.: 27820
- Website: AMC-9
- Mission duration: 15 years (planned); 14 years, 11 days (achieved)

Spacecraft properties
- Spacecraft: GE-12
- Spacecraft type: Spacebus
- Bus: Spacebus-3000B3
- Manufacturer: Alcatel Space
- Launch mass: 4,100 kg (9,000 lb)
- Dry mass: 2,000 kg (4,400 lb)

Start of mission
- Launch date: 6 June 2003, 22:15:15 UTC
- Rocket: Proton-K / Briz-M
- Launch site: Baikonur Cosmodrome, Site 200/39
- Contractor: Khrunichev State Research and Production Space Center
- Entered service: August 2003

End of mission
- Disposal: Graveyard orbit
- Last contact: 17 June 2017

Orbital parameters
- Reference system: Geocentric orbit
- Regime: Geostationary orbit
- Longitude: 83° West

Transponders
- Band: 48 transponders: 24 C-band; 24 Ku-band
- Frequency: 36 MHz
- Coverage area: Canada; United States; Caribbean

AMC-9 (formerly GE-12) is a commercial broadcast communications satellite owned by SES World Skies, part of SES S.A. Launched on 6 June 2003, from Baikonur Cosmodrome, Kazakhstan, on the 300th launch of a Proton family rocket, AMC-9 is a hybrid C-band / Ku-band satellite located at 83° West, covering Canada, United States, Mexico, and Caribbean. It is owned and operated by SES S.A., formerly SES Americom.

== 300th launch of Proton ==
A Proton rocket successfully placed the AMC-9 satellite into orbit for Alcatel Space and SES AMERICOM. The launch was conducted by the U.S.-Russian joint venture International Launch Services (ILS). This marks the 300th flight of a Proton vehicle, including 38 years of Russian federal missions and seven years with commercial flights under the auspices of ILS. Today's mission was the first Proton rocket launch of the year for ILS. The vehicle used today was Proton vehicle with a Briz-M upper stage, which lifted off from the Baikonur Cosmodrome at 22:15 on 6 June 2003 UTC. After 8 hours and 55 minutes, the AMC-9 satellite was separated from the Briz-M and placed into geostationary transfer orbit. Satellite builder Alcatel Space of Cannes, France, contracted for the launch as a delivery-in-orbit mission.

== 17 June 2017 serious anomaly ==
The GEO communications spacecraft AMC-9, formerly known as GE-12, experienced an energetic event estimated to have occurred at approximately 07:10 UTC on 17 June 2017, after approximately 14 years on-orbit. SES S.A., the spacecraft owner-operator, described this event as a "serious anomaly". Following this event, the spacecraft began a westward drift in the GEO belt. Debris fragments have been observed in the vicinity of the AMC-9 spacecraft. The NASA Orbital Debris Program Office (ODPO) characterizes this episode as an anomalous event. The spacecraft bus is the popular Thales Alenia Space (formerly Alcatel Space) Spacebus-3000B3 satellite bus. Spacecraft dry mass is estimated to be on the order of 2000 kg. On-board stored energy sources include fuel and pressurized components, as well as the battery subsystem. SES claims that it re-established contact with the satellite on 1 July 2017, that it poses no risk of a collision with other active satellites, and that by the end of the day following the anomaly, most of AMC-9's traffic had been transferred to other SES satellites. SES regained control of the spacecraft and retired AMC-9 to the long-term super-synchronous graveyard orbit.
