= Arabsat-1A =

Saudi Arabian communication satellite

- Mission type: Communication
- Operator: Arabsat
- COSPAR ID: 1985-015A
- SATCAT no.: 15560
- Mission duration: 7 years

Spacecraft properties
- Bus: Spacebus 100
- Manufacturer: Aérospatiale
- Launch mass: 1170 kg
- Dry mass: 532 kg

Start of mission
- Launch date: 8 February 1985, 23:22:00 UTC
- Rocket: Ariane 3
- Launch site: Kourou, ELA-1
- Contractor: Arianespace

End of mission
- Deactivated: March 1992

Orbital parameters
- Reference system: Geocentric
- Regime: Geostationary
- Longitude: 19.0° East
- Perigee altitude: 33911 km
- Apogee altitude: 35849 km
- Inclination: 0.2°
- Period: 1390.1 minutes
- Epoch: 8 February 1985

Transponders
- Band: 2 S-band; 25 C-Band

Arabsat-1A (Arabic: عربسات-A1) was a Saudi Arabian communications satellite which was operated by Arab Satellite Communications Organization. It was used to provide communication services to the Arab States. It was constructed by Aérospatiale, based on the Spacebus 100 satellite bus, and carries two NATO E/F-band (IEEE S band) and 25 NATO G/H-Band (IEEE C band) transponders. At launch, it had a mass of 1,170 kilograms (2,580 lb), and an expected operational lifespan of seven years.

== History ==
Arabsat-1A was launched by Arianespace using an Ariane 3 rocket flying from ELA-1 at Kourou. The launch took place at 23:22:00 UTC on 8 February 1985. It was the first Spacebus satellite to be launched. Immediately after launch, one of its solar panels failed to deploy, resulting in reduced performance. It was placed into a geosynchronous orbit at a longitude of 19.0° East. Following a series of gyroscope malfunctions, it was retired from active service, and remained operational as a backup. In September 1991, another problem developed with the spacecraft's attitude control system, and it began to drift eastward. It failed completely in March 1992.

== See also ==
- 1985 in spaceflight
