= Apstar 6 =

Communications satellite

Coordinates: 0°N 134°E

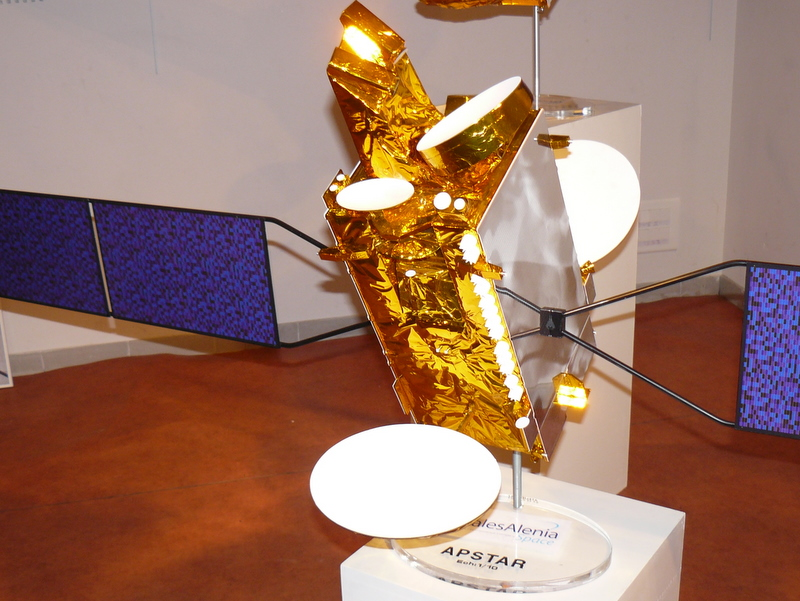
- Scale model of Apstar 6
- Operator: APT Satellite
- COSPAR ID: 2005-012A
- SATCAT no.: 28638
- Mission duration: 15 years (planned); 21 years, 6 months, 6 days (in progress)

Spacecraft properties
- Bus: Spacebus 4000C1
- Manufacturer: Alcatel Space
- Launch mass: 5,000 kilograms (11,000 lb)

Start of mission
- Launch date: April 12, 2005
- Rocket: Long March 3B
- Launch site: Xichang LA-2

Orbital parameters
- Reference system: Geocentric
- Regime: Geostationary
- Longitude: 134° East

Transponders
- Band: 38 C band 12 K_{u} band
- Bandwidth: 36 MHz; 50 MHz
- TWTA power: 64W (C band); 145 (K_{u} band)
- EIRP: at Peak: 42 decibel-watts 60 decibel-watts

Apstar 6 is a communications satellite built by Alcatel Space, a subsidiary of Alcatel, and was boosted into orbit on April 12, 2005, by Long March 3B launcher from Xichang Satellite Launch Center in China. It provides APT Satellite, a satellite operator in the Asia Pacific region, with broadband media and television services. It is fitted with 38 C-band transponders and 12 K_{u} band transponders. China is covered with a dedicated high power K_{u} band beam for broadband multimedia transmission. It is the second model of the Spacebus 4000. The transponders have a reduced C-band receiving dish over a wide footprint, which extends across India, China and Australia.

It is significant in enhancing cooperation between Alcatel Space and China as a - to the SINOSAT satellite. Apstar 6 was built as an ITAR-free satellite, containing no restricted U.S. components. Under the U.S. ITAR regulations, U.S. satellite components may not be exported for launch on Chinese rockets. However, the U.S. Department of State did not accept the ITAR-free status of these satellites and fined the US company Aeroflex $8 million for selling ITAR components. In 2013, Thales Alenia discontinued its ITAR-free satellite line.
