= Telstar 401 =

Communications satellite

- Mission type: Communication
- Operator: AT&T Corporation
- COSPAR ID: 1993-077A
- SATCAT no.: 22927
- Mission duration: 4 years

Spacecraft properties
- Bus: AS-7000
- Manufacturer: Lockheed Martin
- Launch mass: 3,375 kilograms (7,441 lb)

Start of mission
- Launch date: 16 December 1993, 00:40:02 UTC
- Rocket: Atlas IIAS AC-108
- Launch site: Cape Canaveral LC-36B

End of mission
- Last contact: 11 January 1997, 11:15 UTC

Orbital parameters
- Reference system: Geocentric
- Regime: Geostationary
- Perigee altitude: 35,784 kilometers (22,235 mi)
- Apogee altitude: 35,790 kilometers (22,240 mi)
- Inclination: 0.0 degrees
- Period: 1436.11 minutes
- Epoch: 16 January 1994

Telstar 401 is a communication satellite owned by AT&T Corporation, which was launched in 1993, to replace Telstar 301. It was rendered inoperable by a magnetic storm in 1997.

At the time of its loss it served as the home base for TV networks such as Fox Broadcasting, CBS, PBS, ABC, and UPN.

The satellite is now space debris, remaining in geosynchronous orbit.
