= Spacebus =

Brand of satellite bus

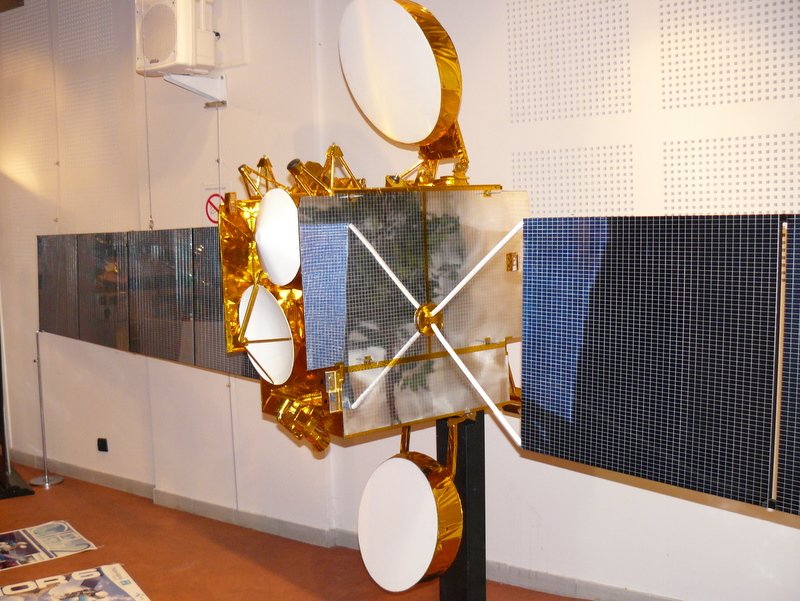
- Eutelsat 28A, a Spacebus 3000
- Manufacturer: Thales Alenia Space
- Country of origin: France
- Applications: Communications

Specifications
- Power: 16 kW
- Regime: Geostationary
- Design life: 15 years

Production
- Status: In production
- On order: 7
- Built: 74
- Launched: 74
- Failed: 1
- Lost: 4
- Maiden launch: 1985
- Last launch: 20 August 2015

Spacebus is a satellite bus produced at the Cannes Mandelieu Space Center in France by Thales Alenia Space. Spacebuses are typically used for geostationary communications satellites, and seventy-four have been launched since development started in the 1980s. Spacebus was originally produced by Aérospatiale and later passed to Alcatel Alenia Space. In 2006, it was sold to Thales Group as Thales Alenia Space.

The first Spacebus satellite, Arabsat-1A, was launched in 1985. Since then, seventy-four have been launched, with one more completed, and six outstanding orders. The launch of the 50th Spacebus satellite, Star One C1, occurred in November 2007. It was a Spacebus 3000B3, launched by an Ariane 5 rocket flying from the Guiana Space Centre in Kourou, French Guiana.

Several variants have been built: the early Spacebus 100 and Spacebus 300; followed by the Spacebus 2000, optimised for launch on the Ariane 4 carrier rocket; and the subsequent modular Spacebus 3000 and 4000 series, designed for use with the Ariane 5 rocket.

== History ==
Aérospatiale had produced a number of satellites, including Symphonie, with the German company Messerschmitt. On 9 December 1983, the two companies signed the Franco-German Spacebus Agreement. The Spacebus designation was first applied to satellites which were under construction by Aérospatiale when the programme started. These included three satellites for Arabsat, which became the Spacebus 100 series, and five further satellites: two for Deutsche Bundespost, two for TéléDiffusion de France, and the Swedish Space Corporation's Tele-X, which became the Spacebus 300 series. Later series' names were followed by a number indicating the approximate mass of the bus in kilograms. Spacebus designations were not retroactively applied to previously launched satellites.

== Architecture ==
Spacebus satellites consist of a satellite bus, which provides power, propulsion, and other subsystems necessary for the satellite's operation, and a payload which is customisable according to the customer's requirements. The bus was designed to be adaptable to perform various missions; however, as of 2009, only communications satellites have been ordered. It was also designed to be adaptable when the capacity of launch systems increased.

The bus is made of carbon fibre with a composite honeycomb structure. It contains fuel tanks, equipment to interface with a carrier rocket, and other critical systems. External panels contain equipment such as solar panels, payload, and engine. The payload, developed separately from the bus, takes up three panels. Once it has been outfitted with transponders or other equipment, it is transported to Cannes-Mandelieu, where it is integrated onto the bus.

The satellites are powered by rigid solar panels. Several configurations are used depending on the amount of power the satellite requires. Batteries to store this power are produced by the Belgian company ETCA. Early satellites used nickel-hydrogen batteries, while later spacecraft use lithium-ion batteries.

Spacebus satellites use bipropellant, liquid-fuelled chemical engines to achieve orbit and subsequently perform station-keeping. Electric propulsion was used on the Stentor and Astra 1K satellites, both of which were subsequently involved in launch failures. Spacebus Neo will be an electric propulsion satellite. A three-axis stabilisation system is used for attitude control.

== Models ==
Spacebus satellites are compatible with a large number of carrier rockets, particularly the Ariane family. As the Ariane's performance has increased, the satellites' capacities have increased accordingly.

=== Spacebus 100 ===
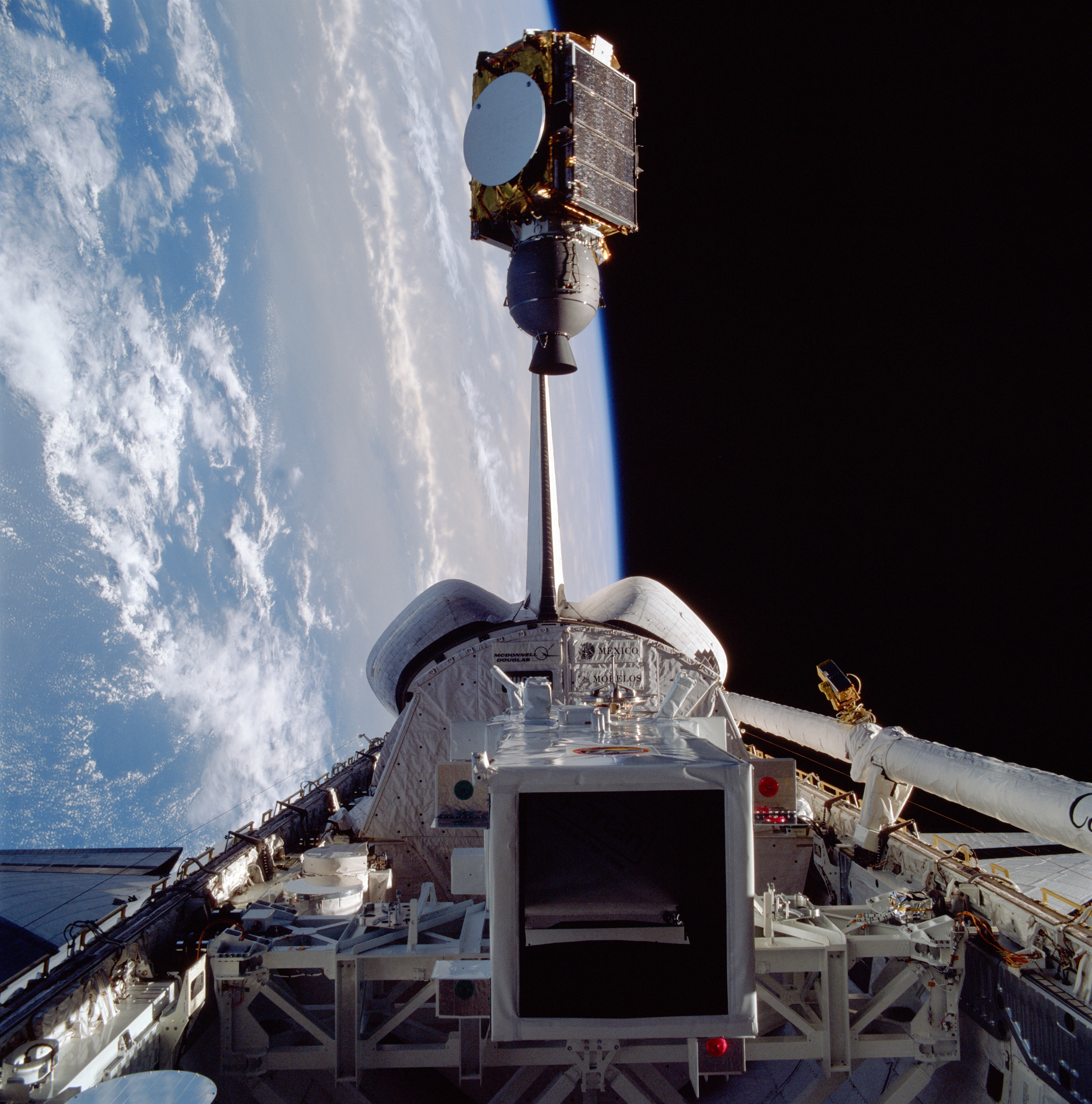
Deployment of Arabsat-1B from Discovery

Three Spacebus 100 satellites were produced for Arabsat to serve the 22 members of the Arab League.

One of the solar panels on the first satellite, Arabsat-1A, failed to deploy, resulting in reduced power. This, combined with gyroscope issues, caused it to spend most of its operational lifespan as a reserve satellite.

=== Spacebus 300 ===
Five direct-to-home television satellites were built using the Spacebus 300 bus, which provided 4.3 kilowatts (5.8 hp) of power.

=== Spacebus 2000 ===
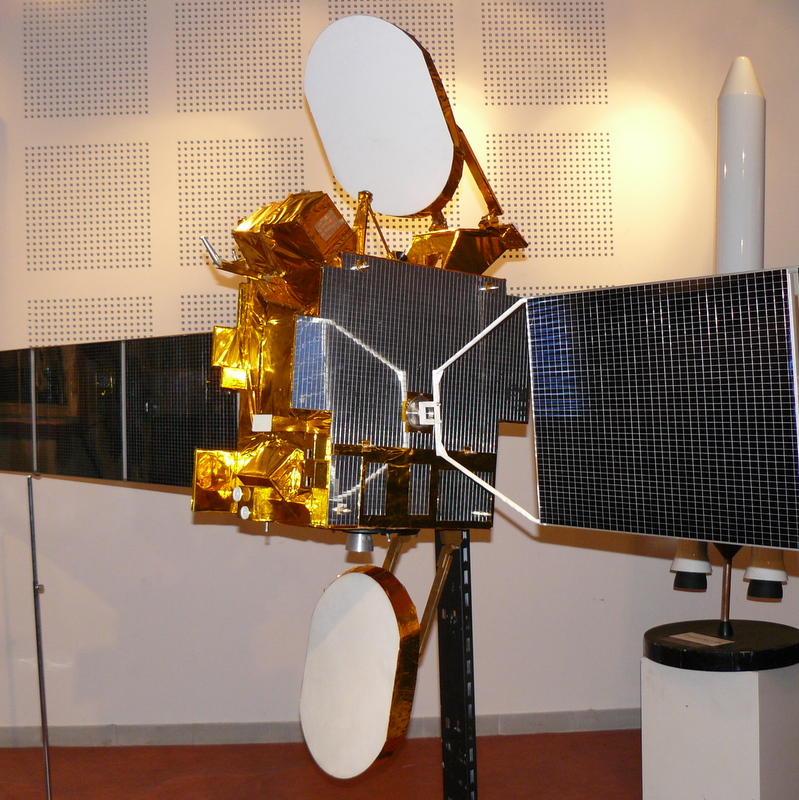
Hotbird-1, a Spacebus 2000

The Spacebus 2000 series was developed to use additional capacity provided by the Ariane 4. Its solar panels generated 3.5 kilowatts (4.7 hp).

=== Spacebus 3000 ===
The Spacebus 3000 was introduced around the time the Ariane 5 entered service. Spacebus 3000 satellites have masses from 2 to 6 tonnes (2.0 to 5.9 long tons; 2.2 to 6.6 short tons) and produce between 5 and 16 kW. Increasingly larger payload fairings allowed larger spacecraft to be produced. In 1991, Aérospatiale, Alenia and Space Systems/Loral joined to form the Satellite Alliance.

The first version of the Spacebus 3000 was the Spacebus 3000A, originally developed for Arabsat. They were also ordered by Shin Satellite of Thailand and China's Sino Satellite Communications Company.

Twelve 3000B2 satellites were ordered, five of them by Eutelsat for their W Series, one of which later became Eutelsat 28A. A sixth order from Eutelsat was for Eutelsat 8 West A. Nordic Satellite AB, a Scandinavian company that later became SES Sirius, ordered Sirius 2, a replacement for the Spacebus 300-based TeleX satellite. Spanish satellite operator Hispasat ordered two satellites, and Arabsat ordered one satellite, Arabsat-3A. The final two were ordered by the German Bundeswehr and were launched on 1 October 2009, and in May 2010, respectively.

Nine B3 satellites were ordered, three for Eutelsat, two for Star One of Brazil, GE-12 for GE Americom, Turksat 2A for Turksat, and the Stentor experimental communications satellite for CNES. Stentor was lost in a launch failure on the maiden flight of the Ariane 5ECA. Galaxy 17 was successfully launched in 2007 for Intelsat.

=== Spacebus 4000 ===
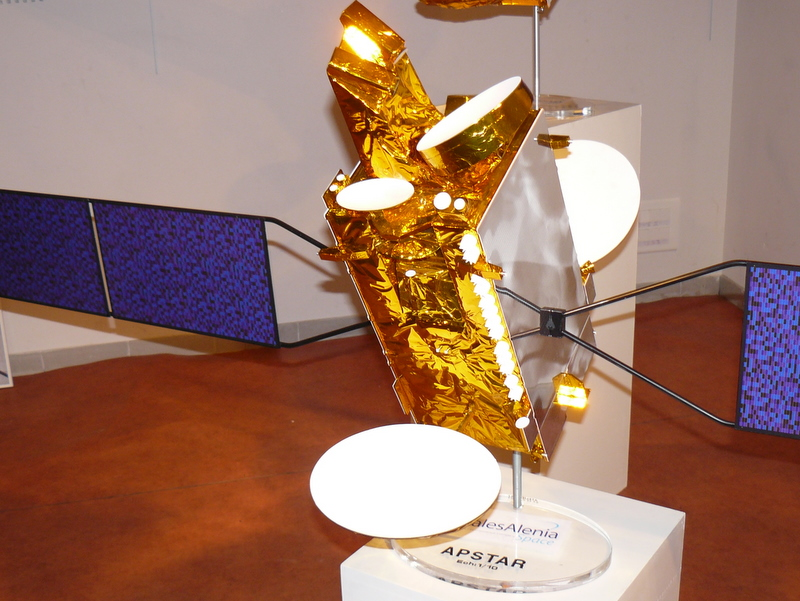
Satellite Apstar VI, a Spacebus 4000C2

The Spacebus 4000 series was derived from the 3000 series but featured upgraded avionics. The voltage of the electrical system was increased from 50 volts to 100 volts, and an integrated onboard computer, designed to be more flexible than previous versions, was added. It was also the first satellite bus to be equipped with an attitude and orbit control system with star trackers designed for use in geostationary orbit.

The B series used the same basic structure as the 3000 series. The C version had a base measuring 2.2 by 2.0 metres (7.2 ft × 6.6 ft).

Eight Spacebus 4000B2 satellites have been ordered: Bangabandhu-1 for Bangabandhu-1 of Bangladesh, Turksat 3A for Turksat, Thor 6 for Telenor of Norway, Nilesat 201 for Nilesat of Egypt, Athena-Fidus for the French and Italian space agencies CNES and ASI, and Sicral-2 for the Italian Ministry of Defence and the French Defence Procurement Agency (DGA), a contract worth about €295m in total, Koreasat-5A and Koreasat-7 for KTSAT and Telkom-3S for PT Telkom Indonesia.

Spacebus 4000B3 satellites are 3.7 metres (12 ft) in height and generate 8.5 kilowatts of power. So far, five have been ordered, including two for the French Délégation Générale pour l'Armement and two for RascomStar-QAF.

The fifth, Palapa D1 for Indosat, uses the ITAR-free configuration, and was launched by a Long March 3B in September 2009, but was initially placed in a low orbit. Thales Alenia Space made corrections allowing the satellite to reach the planned geostationary transfer orbit on 3 September. It finally reached geostationary orbit on 9 September. It is now undergoing on-orbit testing upon its arrival at 113° East about mid-September, where it will be used to provide communications to Asia and Australia. It has enough fuel for 10 years of service, according to Reynald Seznec, President of Thales Alenia Space, instead of the planned 15 years due to the orbit-raising maneuvers.

The first Rascom satellite, Rascom-QAF1, suffered a propulsion system failure during its first apogee manoeuvre on 21 December 2007. It was confirmed to have reached its final geostationary orbit at a longitude of 2.85° east on 4 February 2008, but with only two years of expected operational life, compared to the fifteen expected prior to launch. On 9 September 2008, the Rascom-QAF1R satellite was ordered to replace it, also based on the 4000B3 bus.

The Spacebus 4000C1 has a height of 4 metres (13 ft), and is capable of generating 8.5 kilowatts of electricity. The only C1 to have been ordered so far is Koreasat 5 for Korea Telecom of South Korea. It was launched by a Sea Launch Zenit-3SL from the Ocean Odyssey platform on the equator, at 03:27 GMT on 22 August 2006.

The Spacebus 4000C2, which has a height of 4.5 metres (15 ft), generates 10.5 kilowatts of power. Five have been ordered, all using the ITAR-free option, by companies in the People's Republic of China. Chinasat, a state-owned company ordered two satellites, whilst the APT Satellite ordered three. All were launched by Long March 3B rockets from Launch Area 2 at the Xichang Satellite Launch Centre.

Eight Spacebus 4000C3 satellites, each of which has a height of 5.1 metres (17 ft) and generates 13 kilowatts of power, have been ordered. SES Americom and Eutelsat ordered two spacecraft each. The Eutelsat spacecraft are being built using ITAR-free parts, and one of the satellites, Eutelsat W3B launched on an Ariane 5 on 2010-10-28 and was declared lost on 2010-10-30 due to a fuel leak. Eutelsat 21B was ordered by 9 June 2010.; and launched 10 November 2012; Eutelsat W3D ordered on 3 December 2010;, launched 2013-05-14; Russian satellite operator Gazprom also ordered two satellites for its Yamal (satellite constellation) programme—the first time it had procured Yamal spacecraft that were not manufactured in Russia. Only one will be a Spacebus, the second one is based on an Express-2000 platform.

The Spacebus 4000C4 bus is 5.5 metres (18 ft) high and can generate 16 kilowatts of power with its solar panels. Four have been ordered so far: Ciel 2 for Ciel Satellite of Canada, which was launched on 10 December 2008, and three spacecraft for Eutelsat, W2A, W7, launched by Proton on 23 November 2009. and Eutelsat-8 West B, ordered on 11 October 2012.

=== Ekspress-4000 ===
On 6 December 2007, Thales Alenia Space signed an agreement with NPO PM of Russia to jointly develop the Ekspress-4000 bus, based on the Spacebus 4000. The Ekspress-4000 is designed for direct injection into geostationary orbit by a Proton-M rocket.

== Spacebus NEO ==
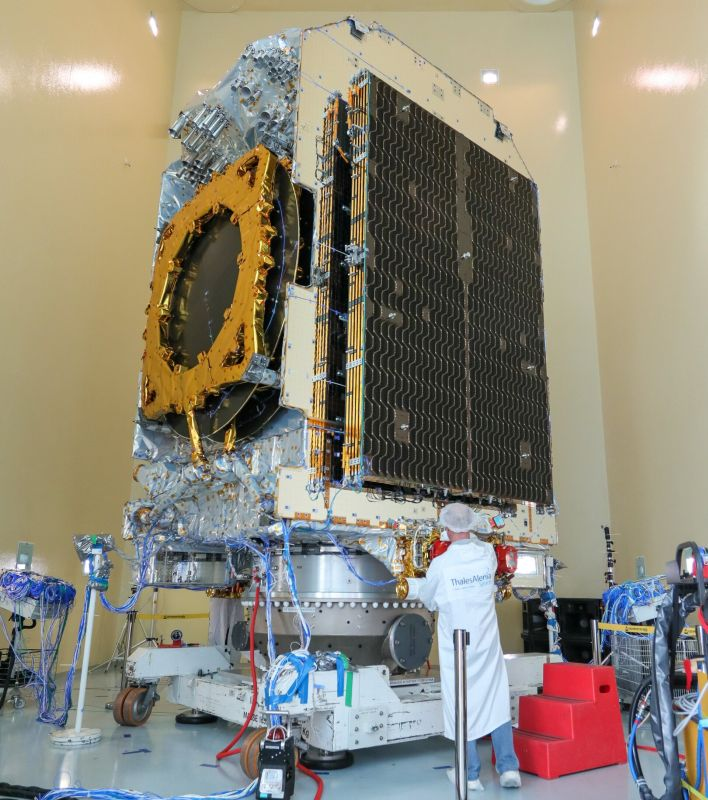
The Konnect satellite, first Spacebus Neo

In 2014, Thales Alenia Space started the development of a new family - Spacebus NEO. These new platforms will be available in various propulsion versions, including an all-electric one. The all-electric Spacebus NEO, capable of carrying payloads weighing over 1,400 kg, and with power exceeding 16 kW, will be available starting in mid-2015.

== See also ==
- List of Spacebus satellites
- Comparison of satellite buses
