= W series (satellites) =

Family of geosynchronous satellites

The W series was a family of geosynchronous satellites operated by Eutelsat which provided various coverage and bandwidth options for consumer and business services in Europe, Asia, and Africa. Some of the services provided by the W series satellites were internet, public telephony, business networks, satellite news gathering, television and radio-programme broadcasting and distribution.

The orbital positions of the satellites ranged from 7° East to 70.5° East, serving many business users, including telecommunication companies, radio and television broadcasters, international news agencies, manufacturing industry and multimedia service providers.

The series was discontinued in 2012 when Eutelsat rebranded its satellites, with the W series, Atlantic Bird, and Eurobird brands being merged to create a single fleet: Eutelsat.
