= March 2016 Ankara bombing =

Terrorist attack in Ankara, Turkey, by Kurdish militants

Coordinates: 39.9200°N 32.8536°E

- Part of Kurdish–Turkish conflict (2015–present)
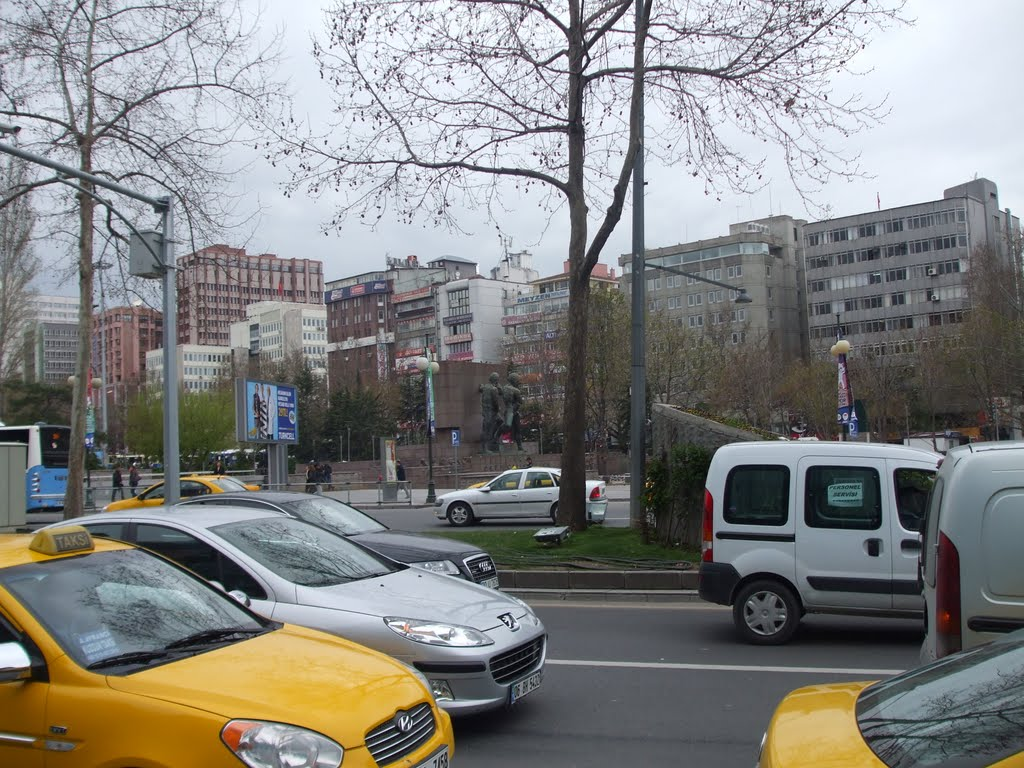
- Place of attack

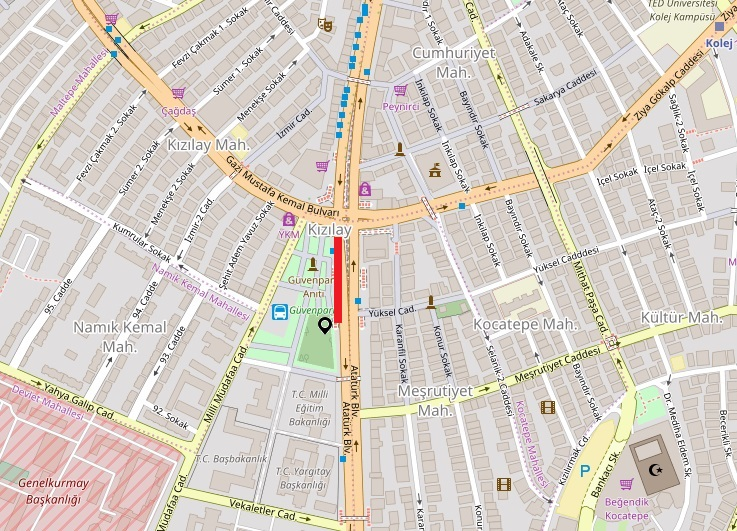
- Location: Kızılay, Ankara, Turkey
- Date: 13 March 2016 about 18:35 (UTC+2)
- Target: Civilians TAK claim: Security forces
- Attack type: Car bombing, suicide bombing
- Deaths: 37 civilians + 1 perpetrator
- Injuries: 127
- Perpetrator: Kurdistan Freedom Hawks (TAK)
- Motive: Anti-Turkish

The March 2016 Ankara bombing killed at least 37 people and injured 125. Of the 125 individuals who suffered injuries, 19 were seriously harmed. Several buildings were also damaged during the event, and a bus and many cars were reportedly completely destroyed.

The bombing took place on Atatürk Boulevard, near Güvenpark, at a point where several bus stops were located. A car laden with explosives was used for the attack, and the buses carrying civilians were targeted. The area was subsequently evacuated as a precaution against the possibility of further attacks.

Following the attack, Turkish authorities reportedly imposed media restrictions: journalists said some broadcast media were subject to a ban on covering aspects of the attack, and the Turkish broadcasting authority, RTÜK, issued a ban on covering aspects of the explosion. Analysts also said that access to social media sites such as Facebook and Twitter was "extremely slow or blocked after the explosion," as social media sites in Turkey were reportedly blocked with the justification that the sites contained graphic images of the explosion.

The daily Sözcü reported that the Ministry of the Interior identified the assailant as Seher Çağla Demir, a Kurdish militant studying at Balıkesir University. A few days later on 17 March 2016, the Kurdistan Freedom Hawks (TAK) claimed responsibility. The group had already claimed the previous Ankara bombing in February.

== Background ==
The attack came at a time when Turkey was facing multiple security threats. It was a member of the coalition fighting against the Islamic State of Iraq and the Levant. There was also an ongoing conflict in the country's southeast with the Kurdistan Workers' Party (PKK), following the collapse of a truce in July 2015. This attack was the third major attack in Ankara in six months, less than a month earlier on 17 February, another bombing had killed 30 in central Ankara. That attack was claimed by the Kurdistan Freedom Hawks (TAK).

=== Intelligence ===
On 27 February, Ankara Police conducted searches for a car bomb in the Kızılay area. There had been Turkish intelligence about 6 bomb-laden cars that were being prepared for an attack by the PKK and there was an active search at the time of the attack for these vehicles in eastern and southeastern Turkey.

The United States embassy in Ankara had warned its citizens about a possible attack in the city on 11 March. However, the warning had indicated the Bahçelievler area as the likely site of the attack, which is located at the same district as Kızılay where the attack took place. The Intelligence Department of the Turkish Armed Forces also reported in a document a "specific warning to a possible terror attack in Ankara, mentioning areas near the blast site of the explosion".

== Attack ==
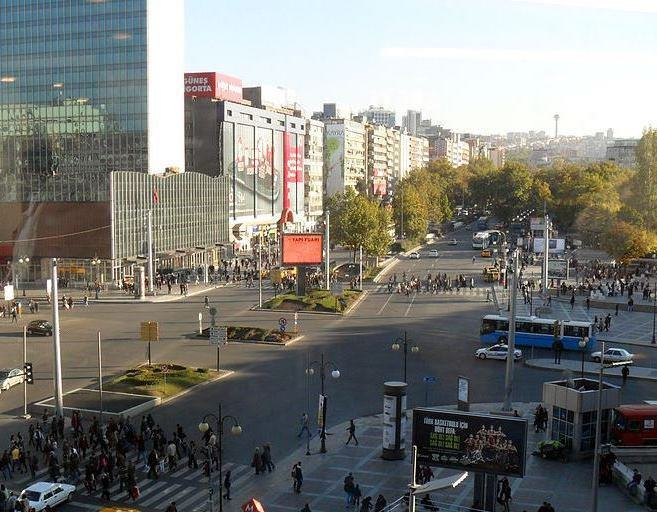
Bus stops on Atatürk Boulevard, targets of the bombing

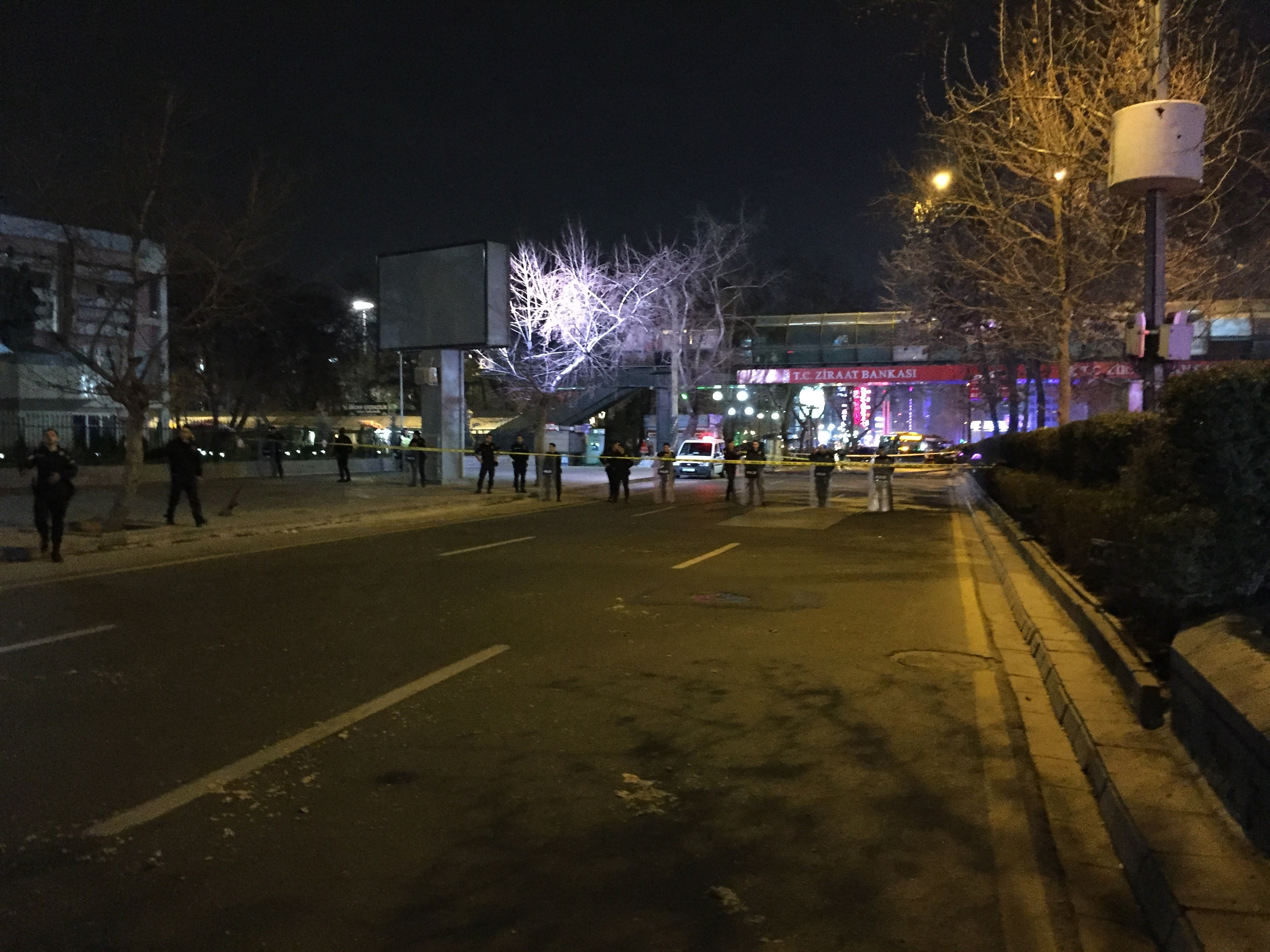
Police have restricted access to Güvenpark and Kızılay Square after the attack.

The area hit serves as a transport hub in the city, where a number of bus lines meet. A number of bus stops are present at the site, which is next to Güvenpark and next to the Kızılay Square, considered the heart of Ankara. It is one of the most crowded areas of Ankara with metro and Ankaray stations also having exits at the area. The Ministry of National Education, the Court of Cassation and the former Prime Ministry building are all close to the site of the bombing.

A car bomb was used for the attack. According to the state channel, TRT, the car hit a bus carrying 20 civilians. An eyewitness stated that while a bus, carrying 40 people, slowed down, the car exploded whilst going by it. The bomb was packed with nails and pellets to maximise the damage. The explosions could be heard from kilometers away and resulted in a shower of debris in an area extending for a few hundred meters.

A car laden with explosives was used for the attack and buses carrying civilians were targeted. On 17 March 2016, the Kurdistan Freedom Hawks (TAK), that had also been responsible for the previous Ankara bombing in February, claimed responsibility for the attack. TAK also identified the bomber as Seher Çağla Demir. The TAK claimed that they targeted security forces and they apologized for civilian casualties but warned that further civilian casualties were inevitable. The location of the bombing was 10 to 20 metres from the closest police station. The correspondent of France24 in Turkey commented on TAK's statement by saying "morally that holds no water because there were scores of civilians at that bus terminus". TAK claims that it has split from the PKK, but it is controversial whether the groups are linked; many sources consider TAK to be affiliated to the PKK.

== Victims ==
The reported casualties include:

- Elif Gizem Akkaya (19): a first year computer engineering student at the University of Turkish Aeronautical Association in Ankara. Akkaya volunteered at Losev, a foundation for children with leukaemia, and TEMA, a foundation that works to protect natural habitats. In memoir of Akkaya, her friends launched the Elif Gizem Akkaya Science and Technology Project which visit high schools to teach students basic robotics and coding skills.
- Ozan Can Akkus (20): a first year Electrical Engineering student at ODTU university. Akkus had recently lost a close friend (Ali Deniz Uzatmaz) in another bombing in Ankara the year prior.
- Feyza Acisu (20): a fourth year student at Gazi University in the Foreign Languages Department of the Faculty of Education. Acisu died waiting for transport after attending a course.
- Nevzat Alagoz (42): a father-of-two, and a police officer. Alagoz died trying to get home after being on duty at a Genclerbirligi-Galatasaray match.
- Mehmet Alan (26): worked at Tabiat Tarihi Museum since 2015.
- Elvin Bugra Arslan (20): born in Ankara, Arslan graduated from Gazi Çiftliği High School, and in 2004 started his bachelor's degree at Çankaya University studying International Commerce. Arslan developed an amateur interest in music in his high school years and played basketball in Fenerbahçe Sports Club Youth Team then football in Gençlerbirliği SC youth team. Arslan had an interest in philosophy, history and mythology.
- Feyyaz Aydin (24): a student at Gazi University. Aydin died in hospital after the blast.
- Berkay Bas (20): a first year metallurgical engineering student at ODTU University.
- Ayse Bilgilioglu (66): originally from Sivas. Bilgilioglu was the mother of 3 and died while waiting at the bus stop. Bilgilioglu lived in Ankara during the winters and worked with her husband servicing an apartment building in Cankaya.
- Turgay Bulut (28): the father of a daughter and worked as a taxi driver. Bulut had just dropped off his last passenger and was returning to the taxi stop when caught in the bombing.
- Kemal Bulut: on his way home after watching his son's team play in the Genclerbirligi-Galatasaray football match. Bulut's son Umut Bulut was a player on the Galatasaray team.
- Mehmet Emir Cakar (16): a high school student who had moved to Ankara from Kütahya in 2010 because he needed a liver transplant. He was due to receive a liver donation from his father. Cakar died while waiting at the bus stop.
- Sumeyra Cakmak (22): in her final year of study at Gazi University, studying chemistry at the Faculty of Education. Cakmak was the second of three children and was on her way back from attending a course.
- Nusrettin Can Çalkınsın (20): a first year student of Gazi University, Faculty of Law. Çalkınsın was with his girlfriend Zeynep Başak Gülsoy at the time of the blast. She also died in the bombing.
- Bagdat Cermik (75), Muharrem Cermik (80) and Perihan Cermik (55): a mother, father and daughter who died after getting caught in the blast. Muharrem Cermik was retired from working with the National Lottery company.
- Fehmi Cetinkaya (67)
- Hamide Sibel Cetinkaya (55): worked at the Ministry of Education. She had just come off the metro and was waiting for a minibus when the explosion took place. Cetinkaya had lost her husband three years earlier to cancer and left behind two daughters.
- Yasar Durakoglu (69): an Assistant Principal of Ankara Bahçelievler Deneme high school where he taught art history.
- Oguzhan Dura (42): had been working as the Chief Supervisor of General Directorate of Foundations and was originally from Samsun.
- Murat Gul (26): was working as a private security officer at the Turkish Treasury. Gul died while waiting for a bus after working over-time on the day.
- Zeynep Basak Gulsoy: a first year law student at the Gazi University Faculty of Law. She was with her boyfriend, Nusrettin Can Calkinsin, also a law student, at the time of the bombing. He also died in the attack.
- Kemal Kalic (49): a retired specialised sergeant. He sold lottery tickets after his retirement.
- Taner Kilic (45): worked as a tea maker in an office.
- Ferah Onder: an engineer working for the head of Department for General Directorate of Agricultural Reform Administrative Affairs and Coordination Department. Onder's husband Orhan Onder was heavily injured during the blast.
- Durukhan Yusuf Ozdemir (18): a high school student and captain of youth basketball team of Ankara Altinel sports club.
- Cemal Ozdiker (58): died after being caught in the blast while waiting at the bus stop.
- Atakan Eray Ozyol (15): a high school student at Golbasi Doctor Serfaettin Tombuoglu Anadolu high school.
- Destina Peri Parlak (16): a high school student She was an only child raised by her mother Hacer Parlak after her father died in a car accident before she was born. Parlak's dream was to become a teacher and she was a very good student. Parlak was out in Kizilay to meet her friends and died while waiting for the bus to go home. A park was built in her name "Destina Peri Parlak Park" in Cankaya which includes a children's playground and sports and recreation areas.
- Kerim Saglam (23): had been visiting his older sister and mother in Ankara. He was a student at Eskisheir Osmangazi University at the Faculty of Education Psychological Counseling and Guidance. Saglam was planning on going to Italy the following month as an Erasmus student. He was waiting at the bus station in Kızılay to go to his sister who lived in the Sincan district.
- Erdem Soydan: a taxi driver who died in the bombing.
- Eyup Ensar Ulas: a married father of two. Ulas worked at his relative's tea shop and was riding on the bus to get to his home in Balgat after work.
- Mehmet Yurtsever: the former district head of Republican People's Party (CHP) in Keçiören district of Ankara. Yurtsever had been waiting at the shared taxi station at Güvenpark to get to his home in Balgat after an activity organized by CHP.

=== Perpetrator ===
Turkish Prime Minister Ahmet Davutoğlu said that there was "very serious evidence" that suggested that PKK was responsible for the attack. The Ministry of the Interior identified Seher Çağla Demir, a PKK affiliate studying at Balıkesir University, as the assailant. Demir was born in 1992 in Kağızman, Kars Province and had reportedly joined the organization in 2013. She was being tried, along with four others, for spreading PKK propaganda. Turkish sources claimed that she had allegedly crossed into Syria to be trained by the YPG. According to her father, Demir's family had lost contact with her when she enrolled in Balıkesir University in 2012. The claims about Demir's identity as the perpetrator were first reported by the newspaper Sözcü. It has been claimed by the Turkish media that there was a male militant accompanying Demir. 11 people were arrested in connection to the attack, and arrest warrants issued for 10 others. As PKK had only directly struck security forces during the period prior to the attack and claimed that it does not target civilians, The Guardian commented that if PKK claimed responsibility for the attack, it would represent a major tactical shift.

According to Turkish media, the car used was a 1995 model BMW that had been stolen in Viranşehir on 10 January and taken that day to Diyarbakır. It reportedly had an Istanbul plate number, and was owned by an elderly woman. On 26 February, the car reportedly arrived in Ankara.

== Reactions ==
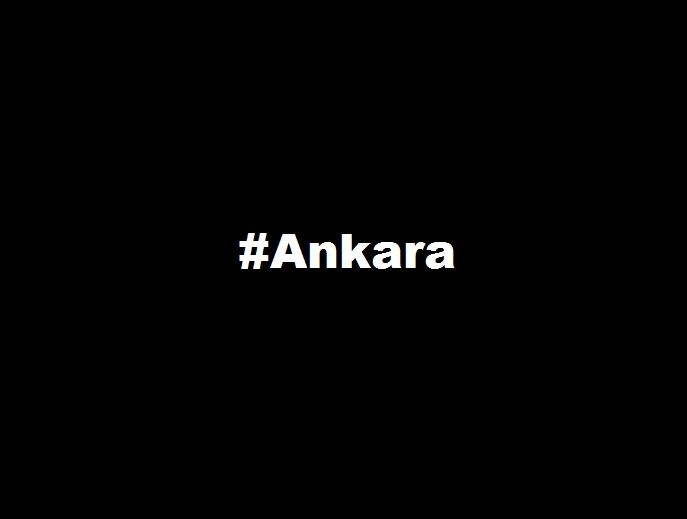
Attack shared by social media users post pictures

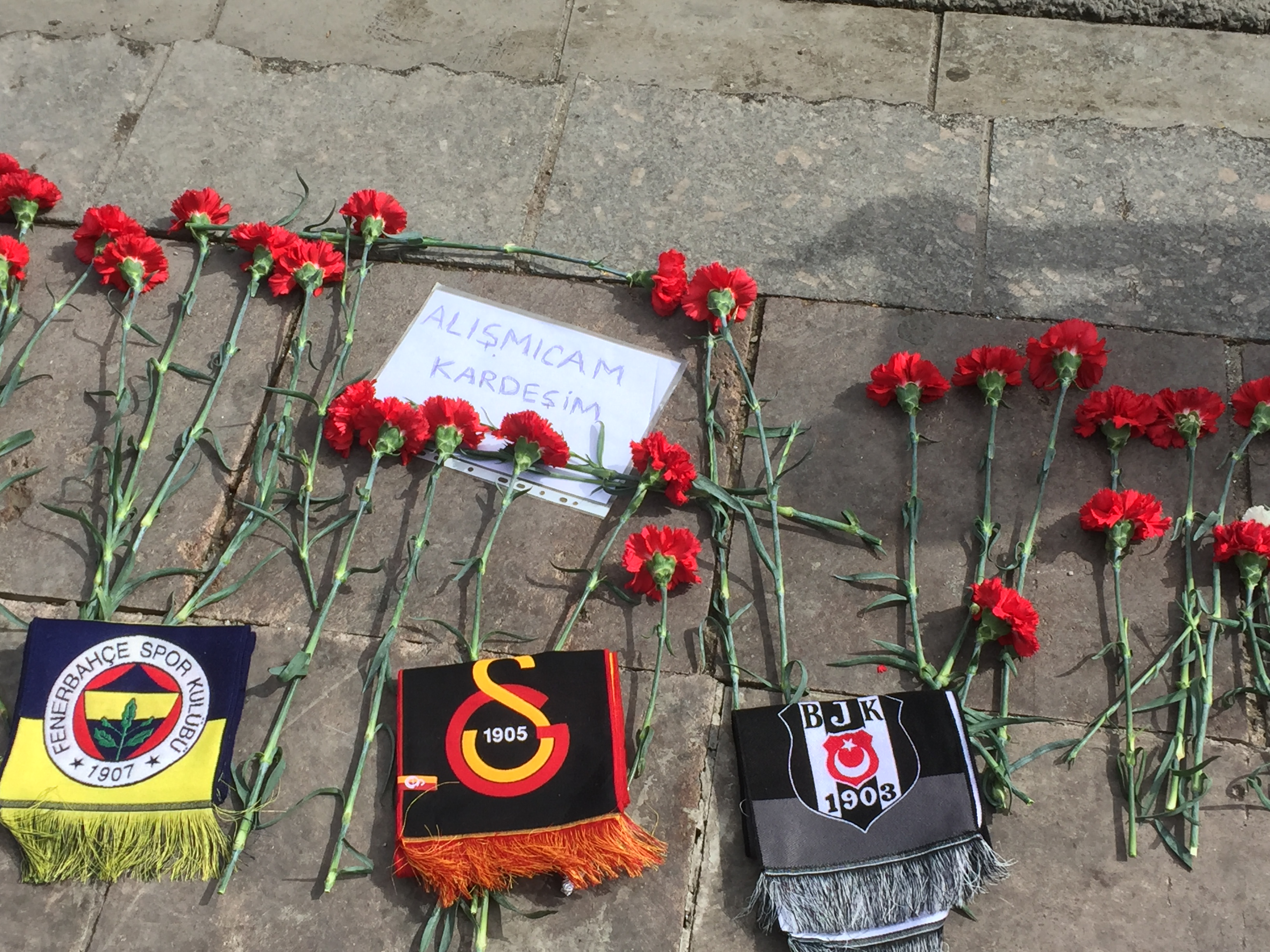
Memorial at the site of the attack

=== Domestic ===
- A security summit headed by Prime Minister Ahmet Davutoğlu convened after the attack. After the summit, Efkan Ala, the Minister of the Interior, deplored the attack and said that although solid evidence had been reached about the perpetrators of the attack, a certain announcement would be made the next day.
- President Recep Tayyip Erdoğan made a statement, in which he said "terror is resorting to the most immoral and heartless ways" and "our citizens should not fear, for the fight against terrorism all our national institutions are carrying out in solidarity with the nation will indubitably end in success".
- Kemal Kılıçdaroğlu, the leader of the main opposition Republican People's Party (CHP), wrote that this was a "terrorist attack that should be condemned without saying 'but' or 'however'".
- The pro-Kurdish Peoples' Democratic Party (HDP) issued a statement condemning the attack. In the statement it shared "the huge pain felt along with our citizens".
- Devlet Bahçeli, head of the Nationalist Movement Party, wrote that "no terrorist attack can bring Turkey on its knees", that the Turkish nation was united against "the plans of the brutes, the calculations of the troublemakers and the merchants of death" and that "the hotbeds of treason will not only be humiliated, but will also pay for this".
- Protesters in Istanbul's Taksim Square attempted to hold a commemoration for the victims. The protesters were dispersed by the police using pepper spray and some protesters were arrested.
- Following the bombing, national mourning was not declared. Mahmut Tanal, a member of the parliament from the CHP, proposed three days of national mourning to the parliament.
- Abdülkadir Selvi, Ankara representative of the pro-government newspaper Yeni Şafak, said "Yes, it hurts, but we have to learn to live with terror for a while" on the TV channel NTV. His words were widely criticized on social media.
- Pro-government newspaper Milat covered the attack only as a sub-heading on its main page. Its main story was the results of a poll that indicated majority support for the executive presidency of Erdoğan, with the title "President Erdoğan". The newspaper was heavily criticized as the topic became one of the most popular on Twitter.

=== International ===
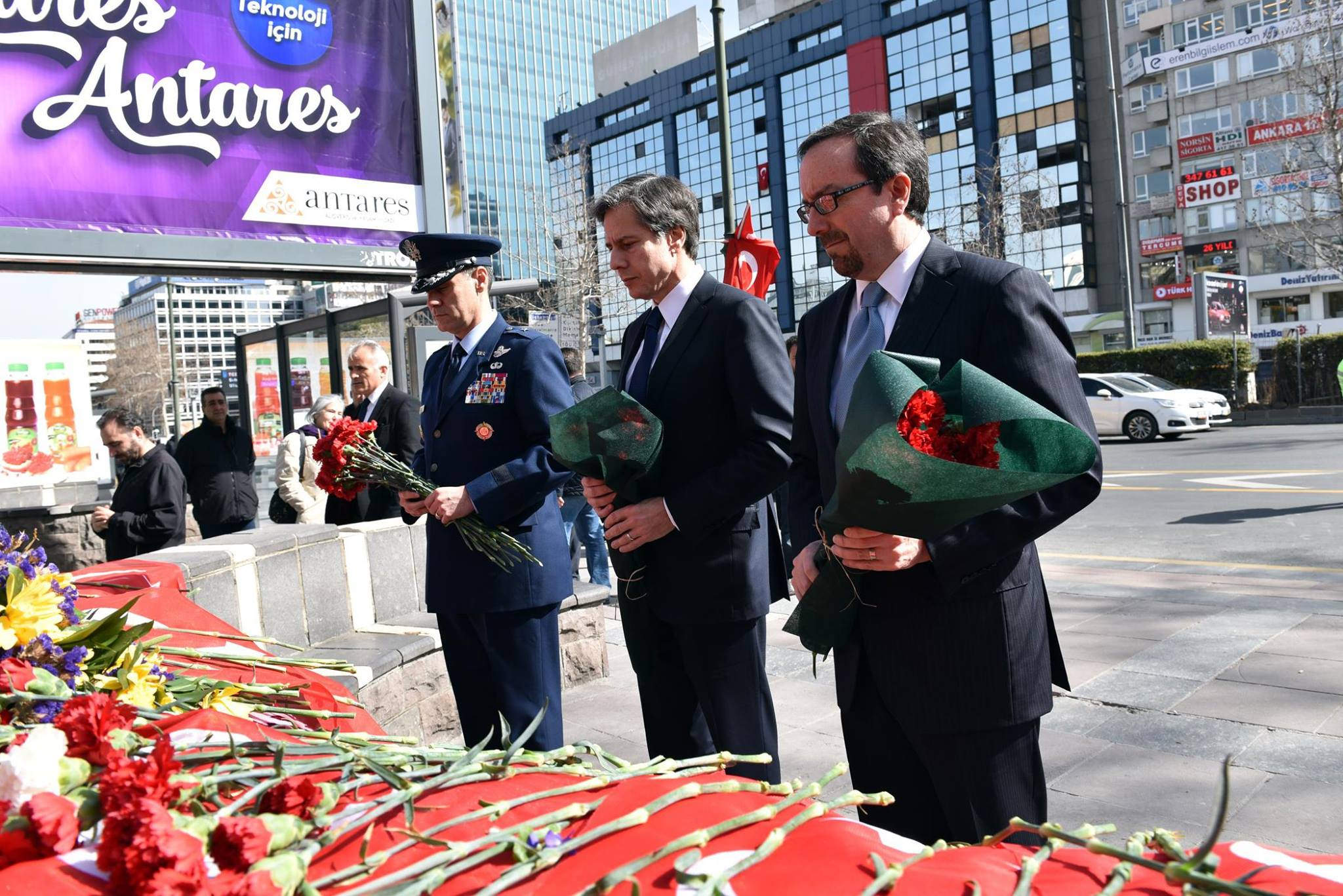
US Deputy Secretary of State Tony Blinken, US Ambassador to Turkey John Bass and Defense Attaché Brig. Gen. Marc H. Sasseville pay their respects to the victims in a memorial

- Argentina: Argentinian Ministry of Foreign Affairs and Worship condemned the attack and called it "brutal".
- Australia: Australia's Ambassador to Turkey, James Larsen, was in his car with his daughter about 20m from the explosion when the bomb went off on the other side of the traffic lights where they were stopped. The Foreign Minister of Australia Julie Bishop spoke to the Ambassador soon after the incident, got his first hand report, and condemned the bombing.
- Canada: Global Affairs Canada stated that "Canada is appalled by this latest, senseless attack in Ankara. Our thoughts are with our friend and ally Turkey."
- Egypt: A statement released by the Ministry of Foreign Affairs condemned the bombing in Ankara, saying that the country "stands with the Turkish people at this critical moment", the statement further stressed the need for the "international community to stand side by side to confront the phenomenon of terrorism and uproot it".
- European Union: High Representative for Foreign Affairs Federica Mogherini and European Commissioner for Enlargement and European Neighbourhood Policy Johannes Hahn sympathized with the people of Turkey in a joint statement and reiterated the union's commitment to enhance international efforts against terrorism.
- Iran: Iran's Foreign Ministry has strongly condemned the deadly terrorist explosion in Turkey's capital, Ankara, calling for a collective fight against terrorism.
- India: Prime Minister Narendra Modi condemned the attacks and stated that his thoughts were with the families of the victims and wished the injured a speedy recovery.
- Indonesia: The Ministry of Foreign Affairs issued a statement saying "The people and government of Indonesian offer sympathy and deep condolences to the Turkish people and government, particularly to the victims and victims' families."
- Philippines: The Department of Foreign Affairs issued a statement condemning the attack. The statement says "The Philippines condemns in the strongest possible terms the inhumane and dastardly terrorist attack on innocent civilians in Ankara, Turkey on 10 October 2015, who were gathering in support of peace. We share the grief and sorrow of the Turkish nation". The statement also said that "The Philippines affirms its commitment to peace and adherence to the rule of law and, together with the international community, stands by Turkey in its fight against terrorism".
- Russia: In a statement made by spokesman Dmitry Peskov, Russian President Vladimir Putin condemned the attack and sent condolences to the people of Turkey.
- Spain: A statement was released which condemned the bomb attack.
- Tunisia: Tunisia condemns the attack.
- Ukraine: President Petro Poroshenko stated that he is "shocked with another horrible attack in Ankara", continuing: "Terror can't be justified, just be condemned. Ukraine stands with Turkey and its people".
- United Kingdom: Prime Minister David Cameron tweeted "My thoughts are with all those affected," saying that he was "appalled" by the bombing.
- United States: The White House released a statement condemning the terror attack. The statement said: "Our thoughts and prayers go out to those killed and injured as well as to their loved ones. This horrific act is only the most recent of many terrorist attacks perpetrated against the Turkish people". The statement continued with: "The United States stands together with Turkey, a NATO ally and valued partner, as we confront the scourge of terrorism."

== Aftermath ==
Following the attack, nine F-16s and four F-4s of the Turkish Air Force raided 18 PKK positions in Iraqi Kurdistan. The areas raided included the Qandil Mountains, the base of PKK leadership. 36 suspected members of PKK or the affiliated Group of Communities in Kurdistan (KCK) were arrested in 45 different operations in Adana Province. Overall, 79 people were taken into custody throughout the country.

There was not a major response from the financial markets to the attack as the value of the Turkish lira receded slightly against US dollar. However, the deteriorating safety situation in Turkey caused major concerns about tourism and led to the analysis that the country is "not yet safe for long-term investors". Following the attack, residents of Ankara were in panic about their security and in the week after the attack, streets were almost "deserted" and malls were "quiet", with Ankamall reporting a decrease in visitors of at least 50%. Shop managers were worried that security concerns could have long-term effects that could destroy small businesses and also said that "the customers' return to the shopping malls will take much longer this time."

== See also ==
- List of terrorist incidents, January–June 2016
