= Bakanlıklar =

Coordinates: 39.913792°N 32.854704°E

Bakanlıklar (literally "Ministries") is a neighborhood in central Ankara, the capital of Turkey. It's a section of the larger Kizilay neighborhood, centered around nearby Kizilay Square.

As the name suggests, the area is the location of several agencies of the Turkish government, most notably the Grand National Assembly, the Turkish parliament, which has met here since 1960. The Supreme Court of Appeals, the Interior Ministry and the General Staff of the Turkish Armed Forces are also located in the neighborhood, as well as the popular Güvenpark.

== Gallery ==
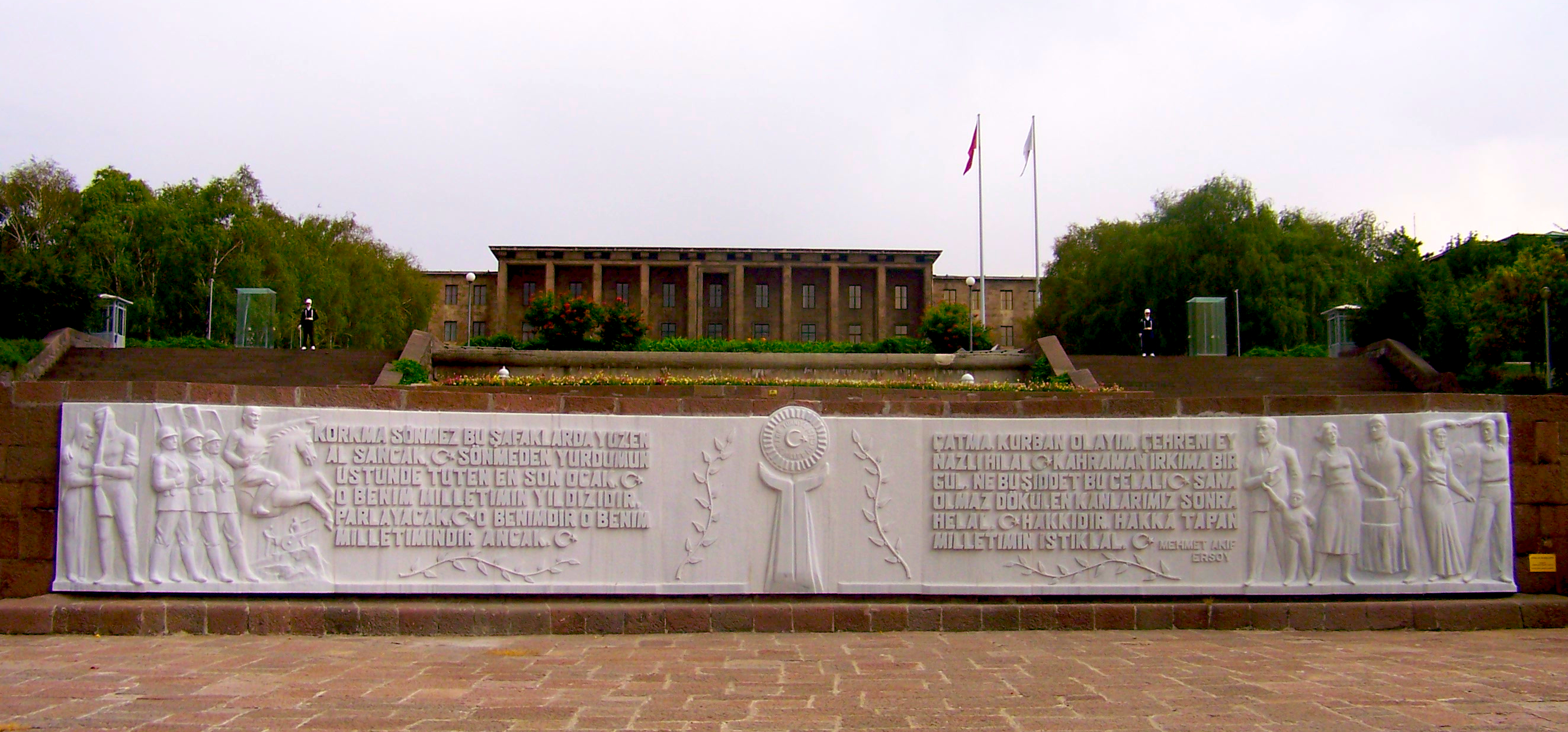
Grand National Assembly of Turkey

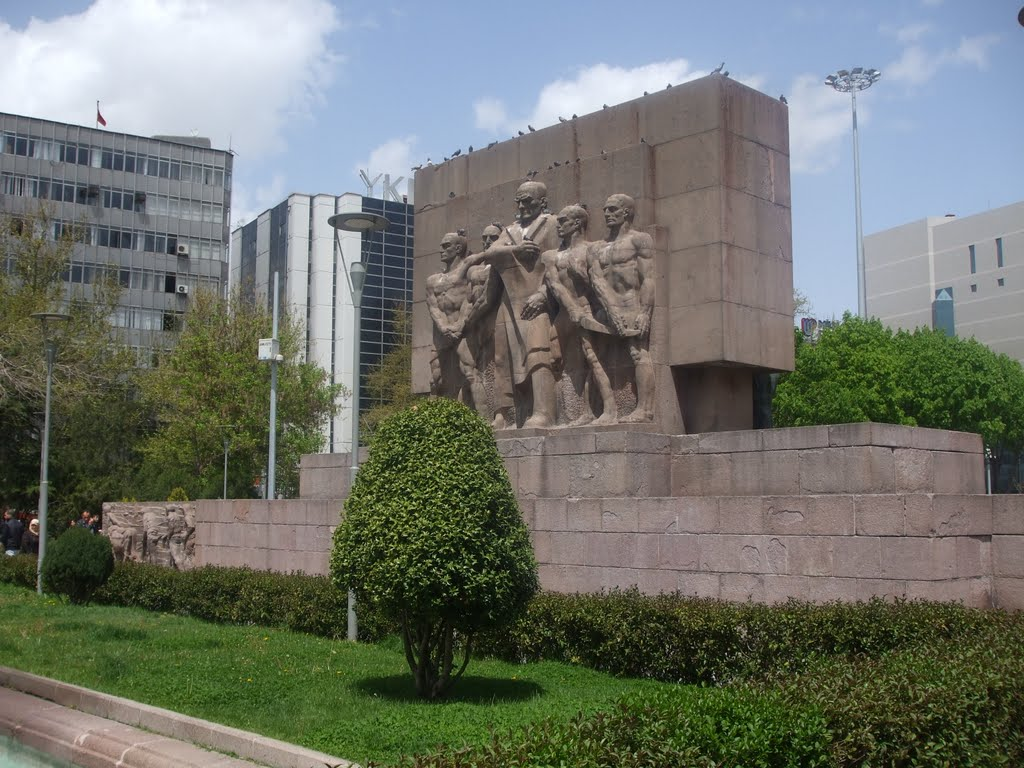
Güvenpark

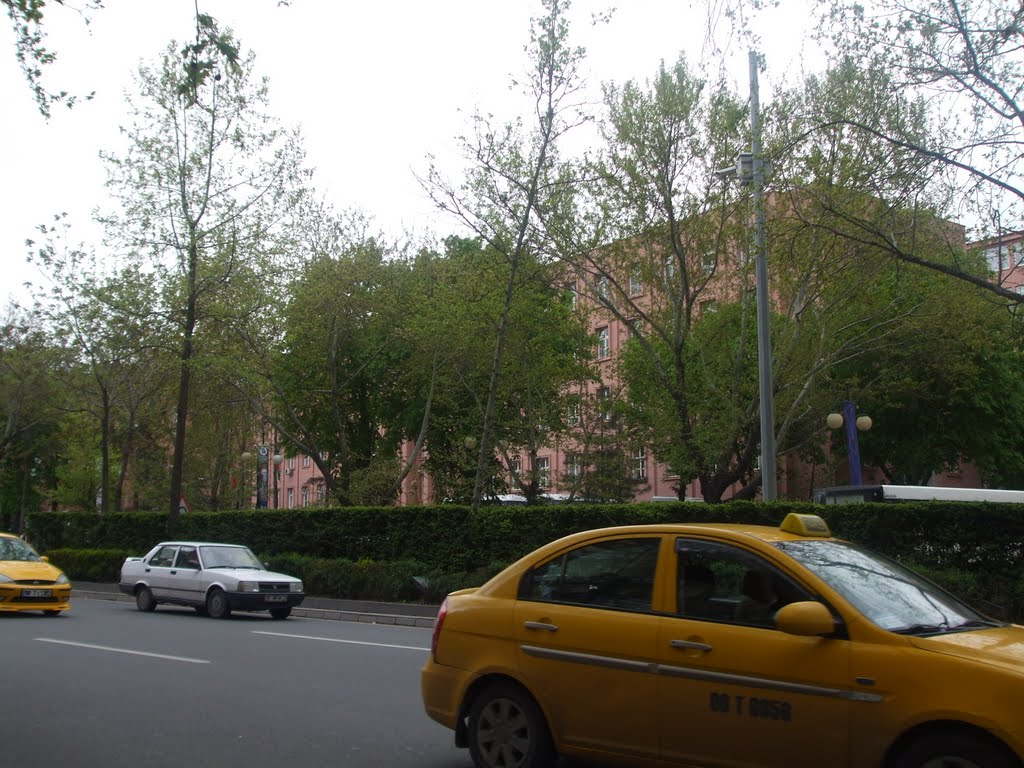
Court of Cassation (Yargıtay)

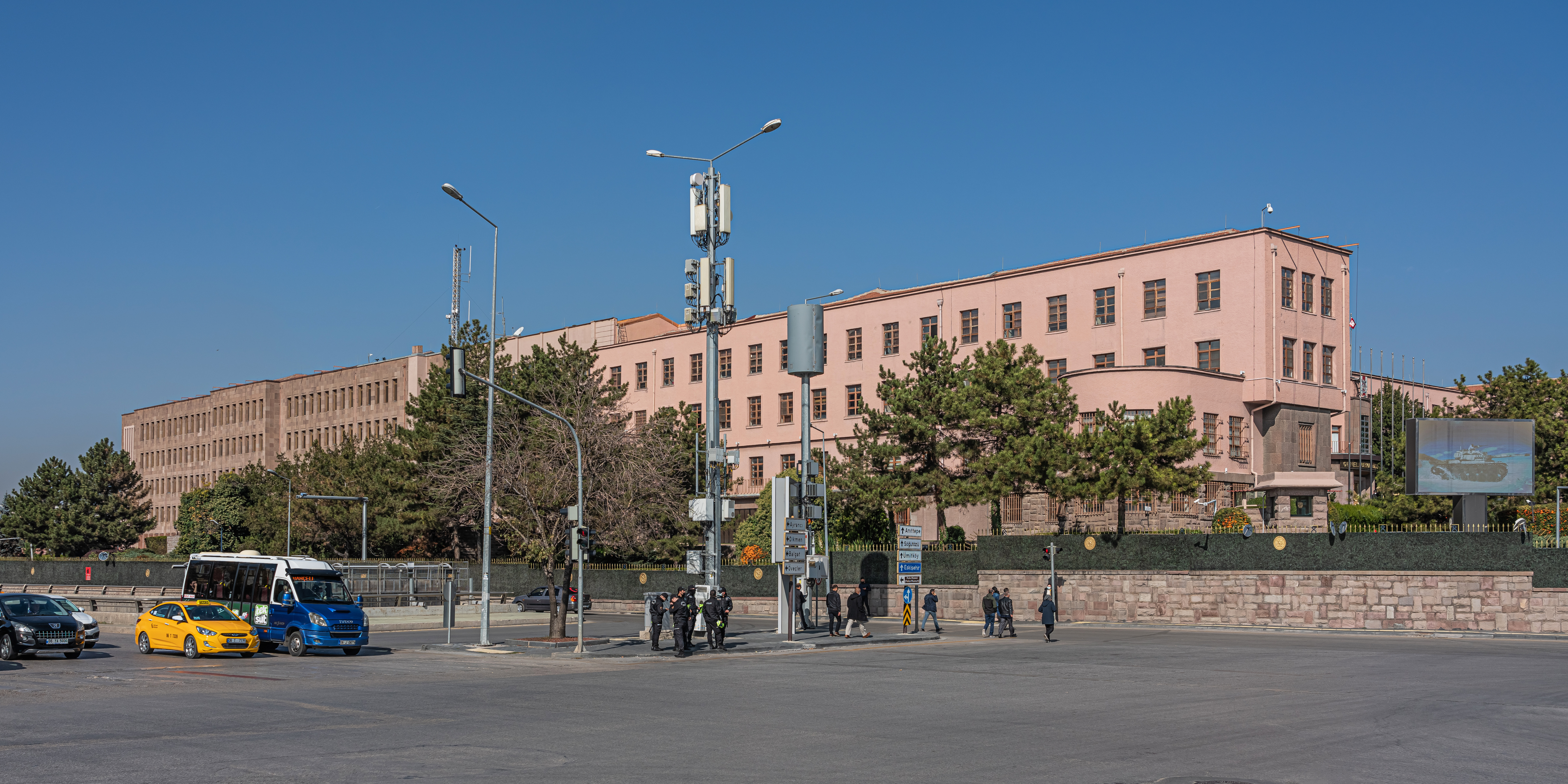
General Staff of the Republic of Turkey

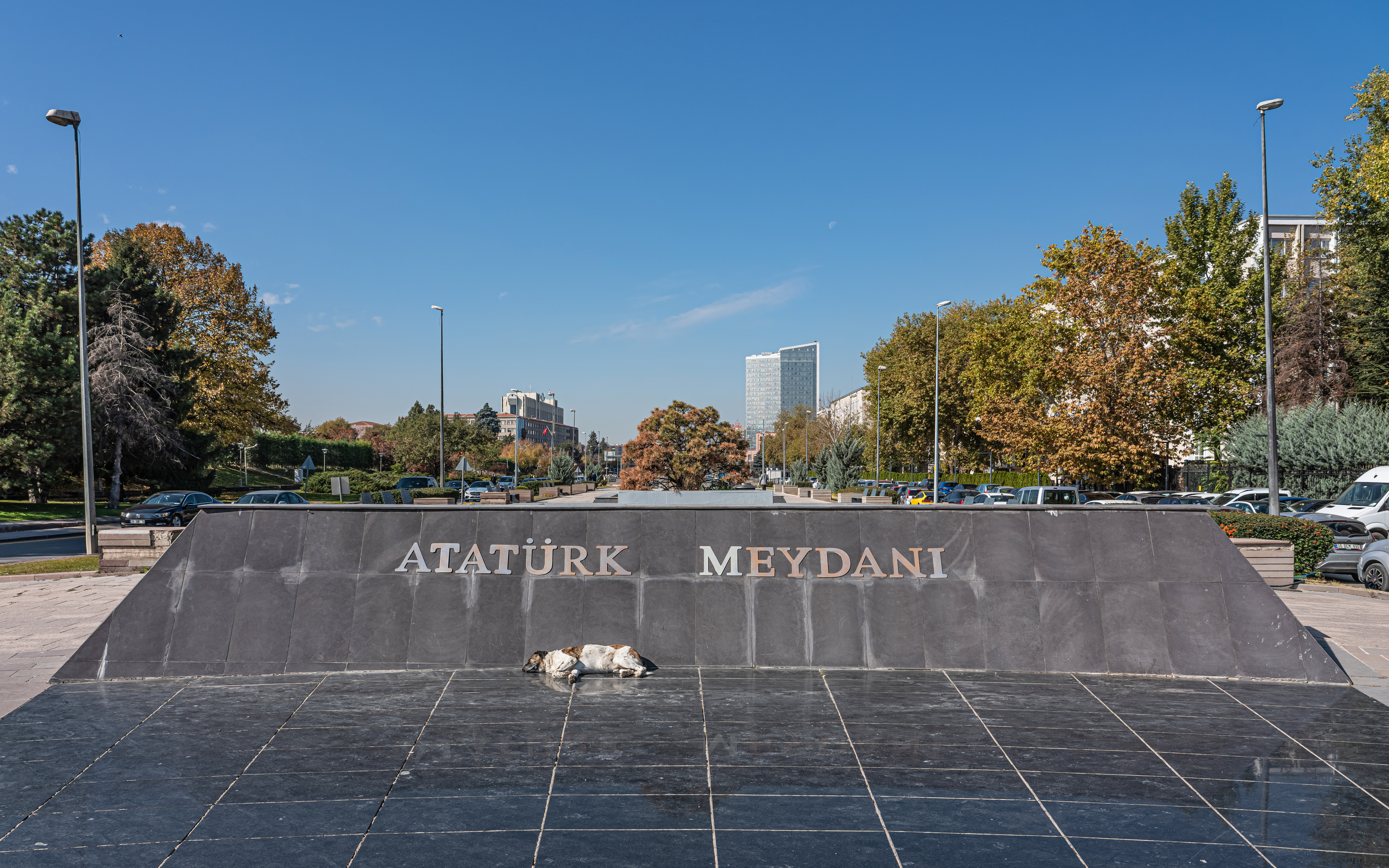
Atatürk Square

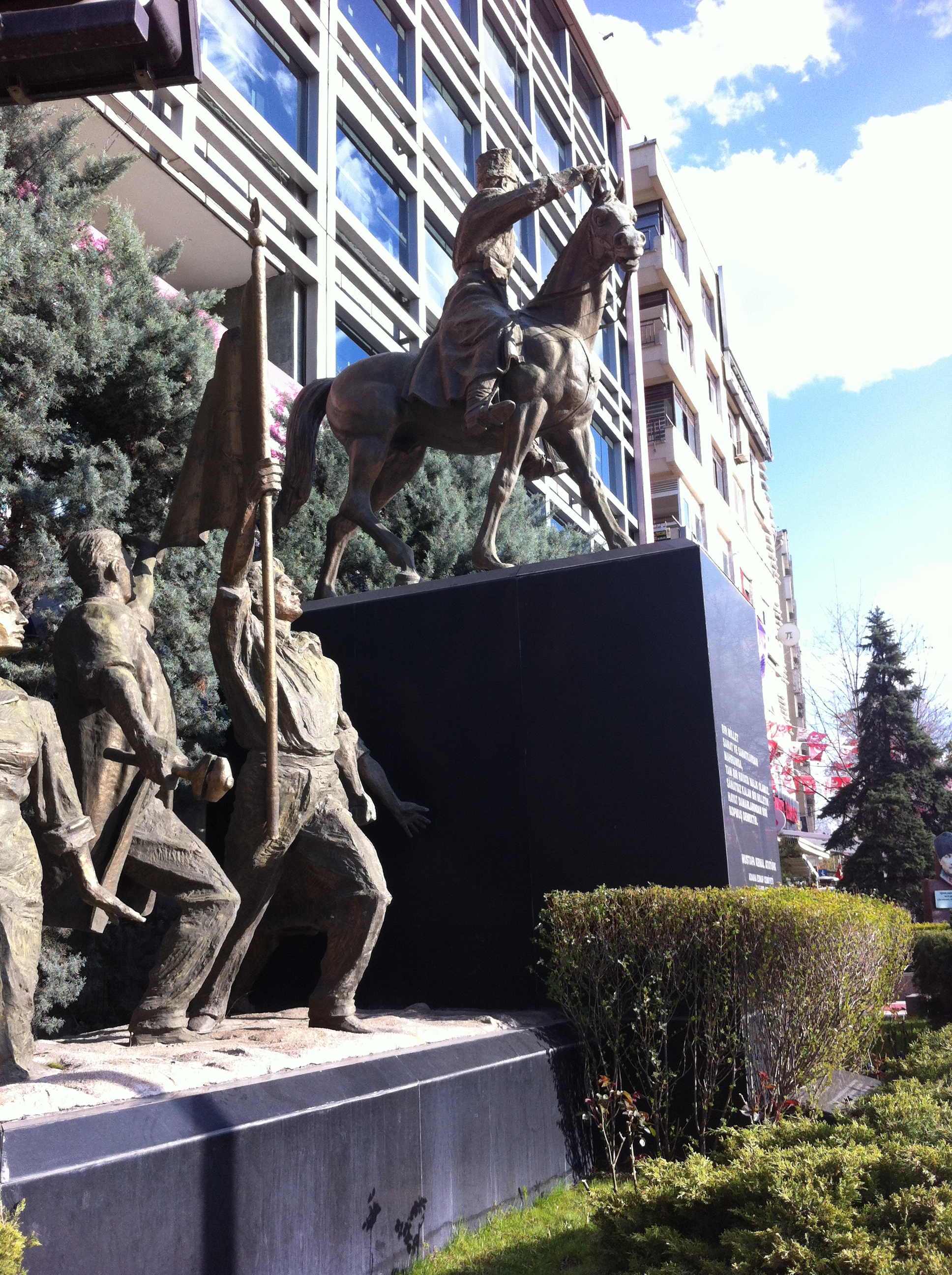
Confederation of Turkish Tradesmen and Craftsmen (TESK) Monument
