= Güvenpark =

Park in Kızılay, Ankara, Turkey

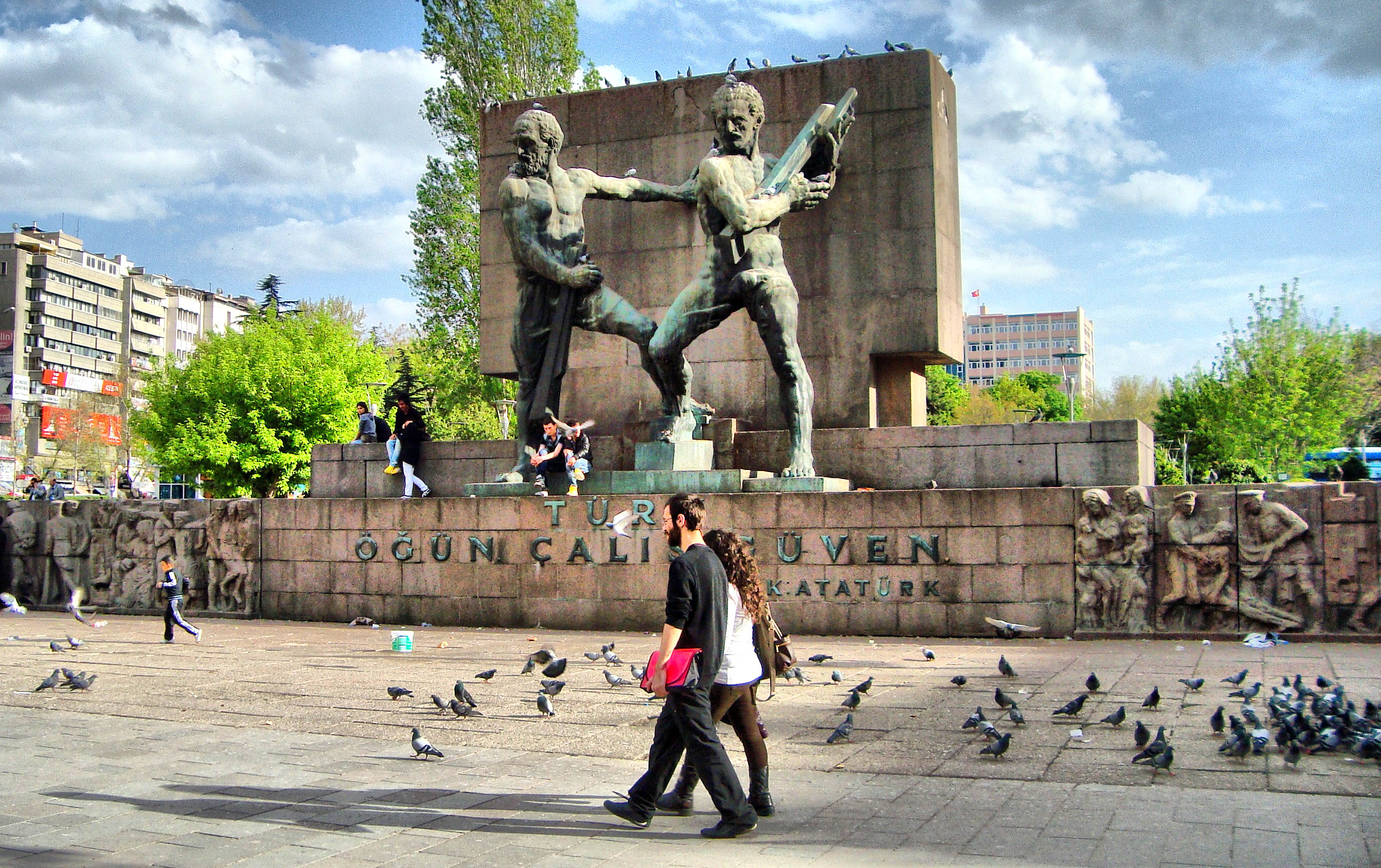

- Location within Turkey
- Type: Urban public park
- Location: Kızılay, Çankaya, Ankara, Turkey
- Coordinates: 39°55′09″N 32°51′12″E
- Area: 2.5 ha (6.2 acres)
- Created: 1930s

Güvenpark or Güven Park (literally: Trust Park), is an urban public park located adjacent to the Kızılay Square in the Kızılay neighborhood of Ankara in Turkey. Established in the 1930s as part of the green belts proposed in the urban plan of the rapid growing capital, the park is noted for the Security Monument. In mid-March 2016, a bomb explosion close to it caused the death of more than 30 people while over 100 were injured.

== Location ==
Güvenpark is situated in a central position of Ankara, the Kızılay neighborhood of Çankaya. It is bounded by Gazi Mustafa Kemal Boulevard at Kızılay Square on the north, by Atatürk Boulevard on the east and by Milli Müdafaa Street on the west. The buildings of the Ministry of Justice and the Ministry of National Education are located to the south of the park.

Next to the park are the Kızılay metro station servicing Ankaray and the M1 and M2 lines of Ankara Metro as well as many stops of city buses and dolmuş.

== History ==
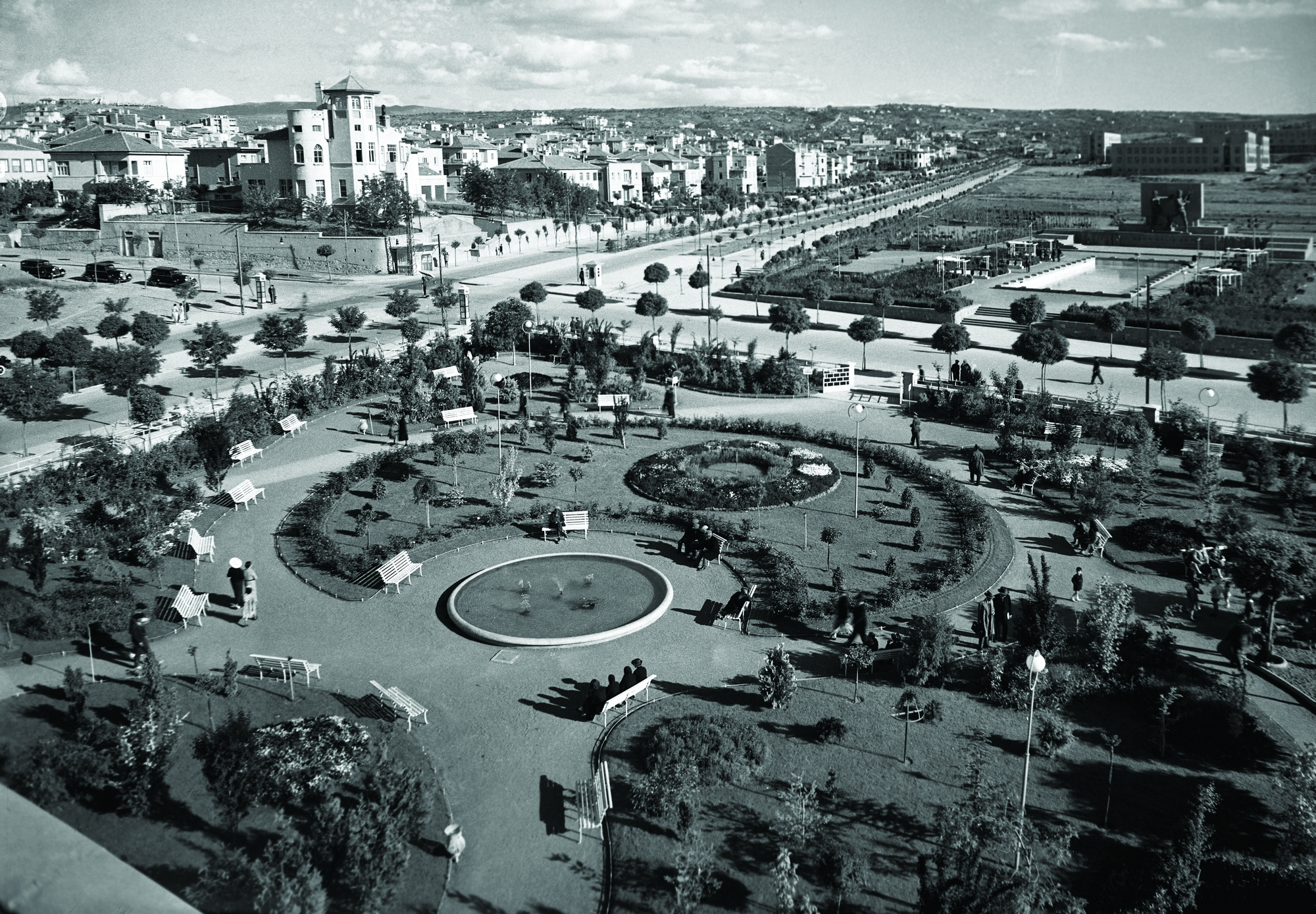
Kızılay Square and Güvenpark (right) in the 1940s.

Güvenpark is part of the 1929 Jansen Plan, which was proposed by German architect and urban planner Hermann Jansen (1869–1945) to integrate green belts and areas within the rapid-growing new capital of the newly established Republic for promoting a healthy urban environment.

The park was established in the 1930s. According to Jansen Plan, the park area was initially reserved for pedestrians and bikers. The park conserved its character until a road-widening project was carried out in the 1950s. In the mid 1970s, parts of the park were transformed into stops for city bus and dolmuş.

Güvenpark is registered by the Çankaya Municipality as a Natural Protected Area of First Grade.

== Park ==
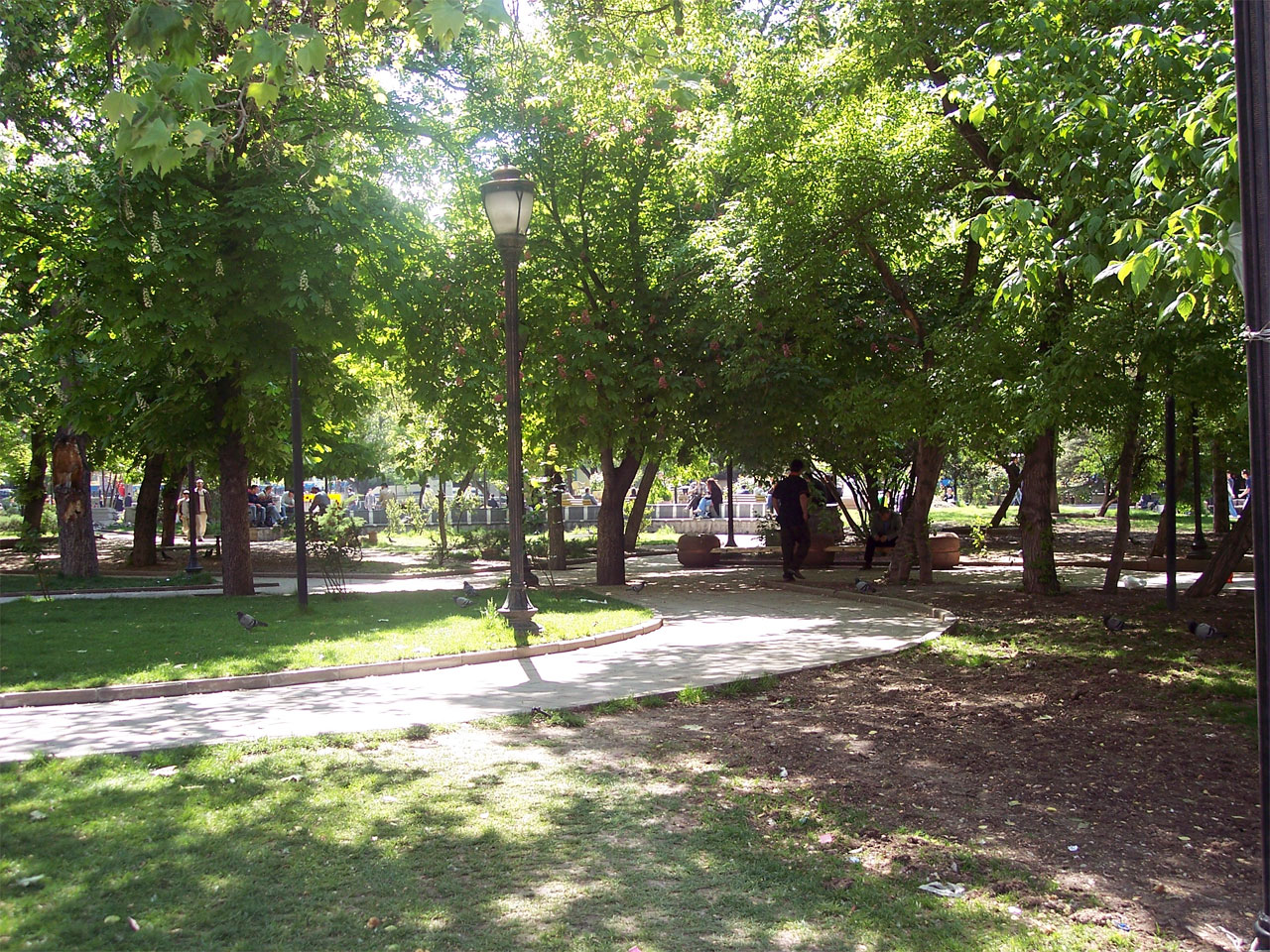
A view from the park's inside.

The park has the form of a trapezoid in the north-south direction covering an area of 2.5 ha (6.2 acres). It features fully-grown trees, benches, pools, children's playground and a monument.

Due to its central location and proximity to a main transport hub, the park serves as a passageway for commuting residents. Many employees from nearby offices spend their lunch break in the park.

== Monument ==
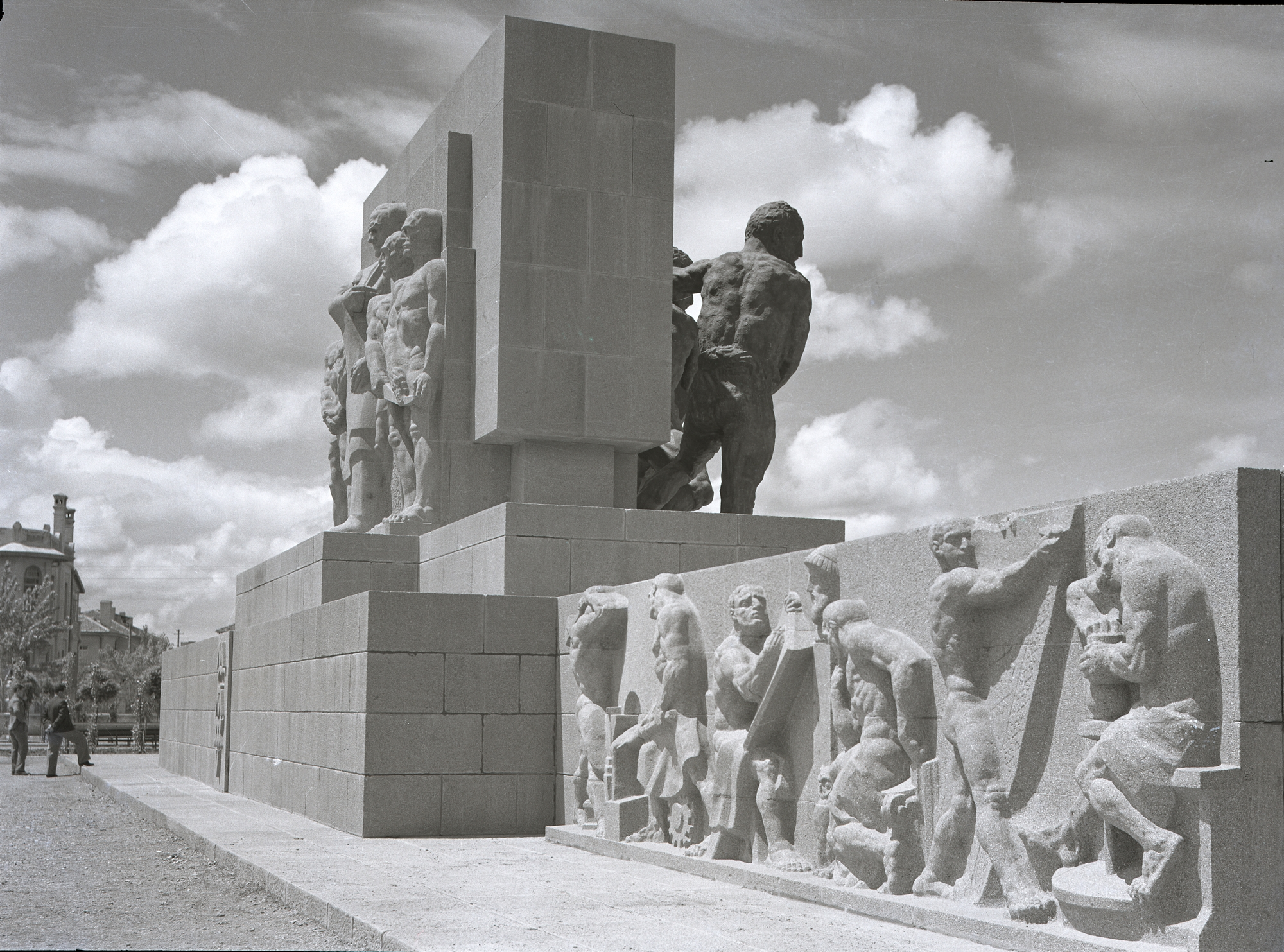
Security Monument in 1940s.

Güvenpark is noted for its Security Monument (Turkish: Güvenlik Anıtı), which was proposed by Austrian architect Clemens Holzmeister (1886–1983), who designed public buildings in Ankara. The monument was created by the Austrian sculptor Anton Hanak (1875–1934). It was completed in 1935 by Austrian sculptor Josef Thorak (1889–1952), who was charged after the death of Hanak on January 6, 1934.

The monument faces Kızılay Square. It is dedicated to the Turkish security forces, which provide security, public peace and order. The bronze sculptures were cast in Erdberg, Vienna, Austria while the bronze reliefs, attached on Mamak stone, were cast in Turkey. The stonemasonary works were carried out by Austrian students of the sculptor and Turkish craftsmen.

The monument's base is 37 m (121 ft) long. The middle block is 8 m (26 ft) high, the side wings 2 m (6.6 ft), and the bronze figures are 6 m (20 ft) tall. On one facade of the composition, apart from the main block, two musician figures are placed above Atatürk's famous phrase "Türk, Öğün, Çalış, Güven!" (literally: Turk, boast, work, trust!). Figures of old people in the background and young people in the foreground symbolize Turkish people's transition from the past to the future. The reliefs depict Turkish villagers carrying weapons to the front, military paramedic teams in the back front, security forces, artists and thinkers envisaged for the new formation of the Republic and craftsmen in various profession groups such as black smiths, miners, potters. On the other side of the monument, Mustafa Kemal Atatürk is portrayed, flanked by youth and looking into a future with hope.

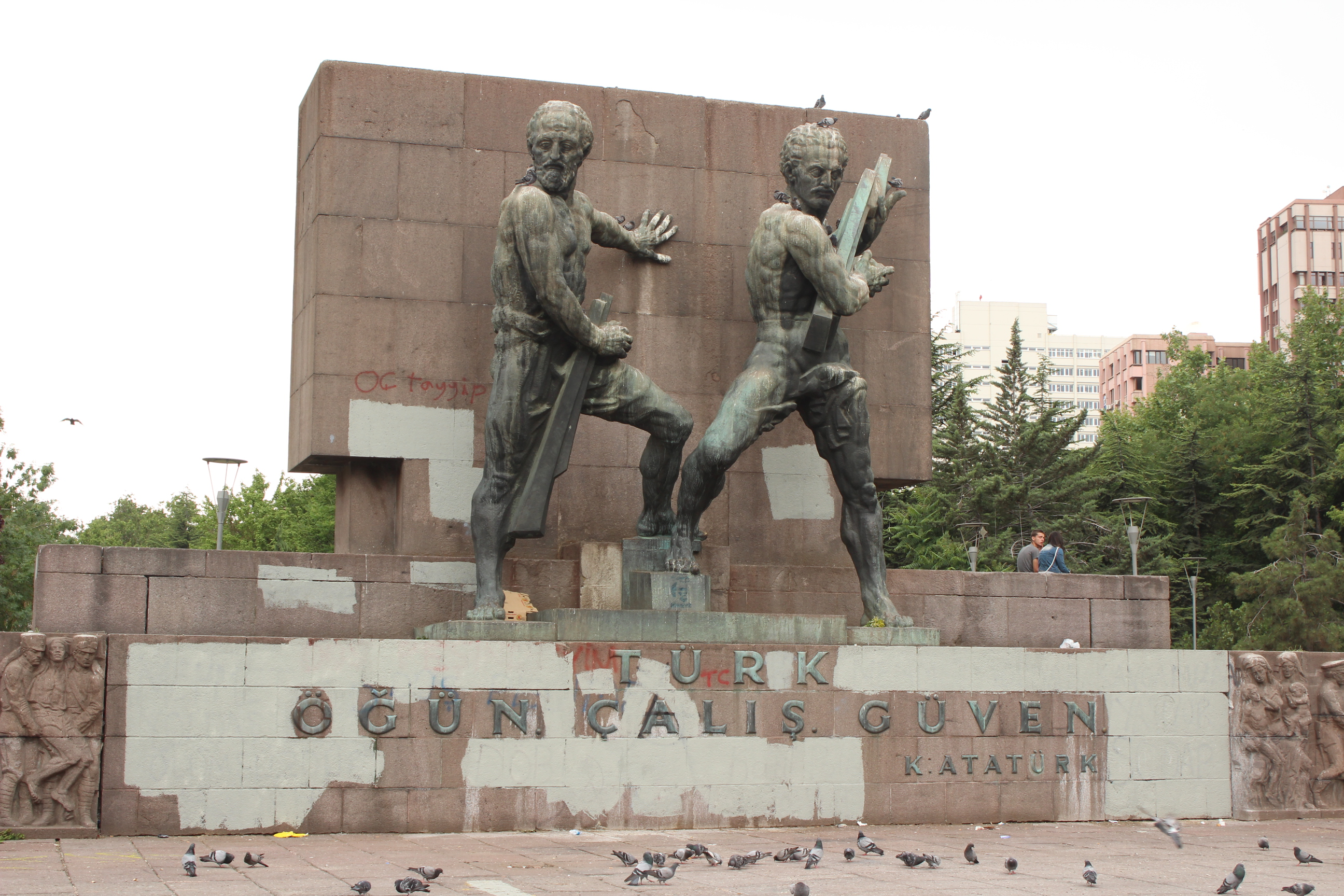
The monument after the 2013 protests

The monument was damaged twice in the 2010s, first in the 2013 protests by graffiti, and second during the coup attempt of 2016 by shrapnel. Due to those damages, the monument got maintenances by Metropolitan Municipality of Ankara in respective years.

== Dispute ==
It was claimed that the park and the monument have lost their past splendor: the busy city bus and dolmuş stops around the park disrupt the calm inside the park, and there were two attempts by Ankara Metropolitan Municipality to build an underground parking lot under the park area, which were stopped by court orders on the grounds of the park's character as a natural protected area. Structures like metro station entrances and metro ventilation shafts, which were built next to the monument, are seen as a damage to the monument's identity.

From 2014 on, the Çevik Kuvvet (Rapid Response Forces) of the Turkish Police were stationed inside the park. Residents have sometimes complained about their continuous presence.

== Bombing ==
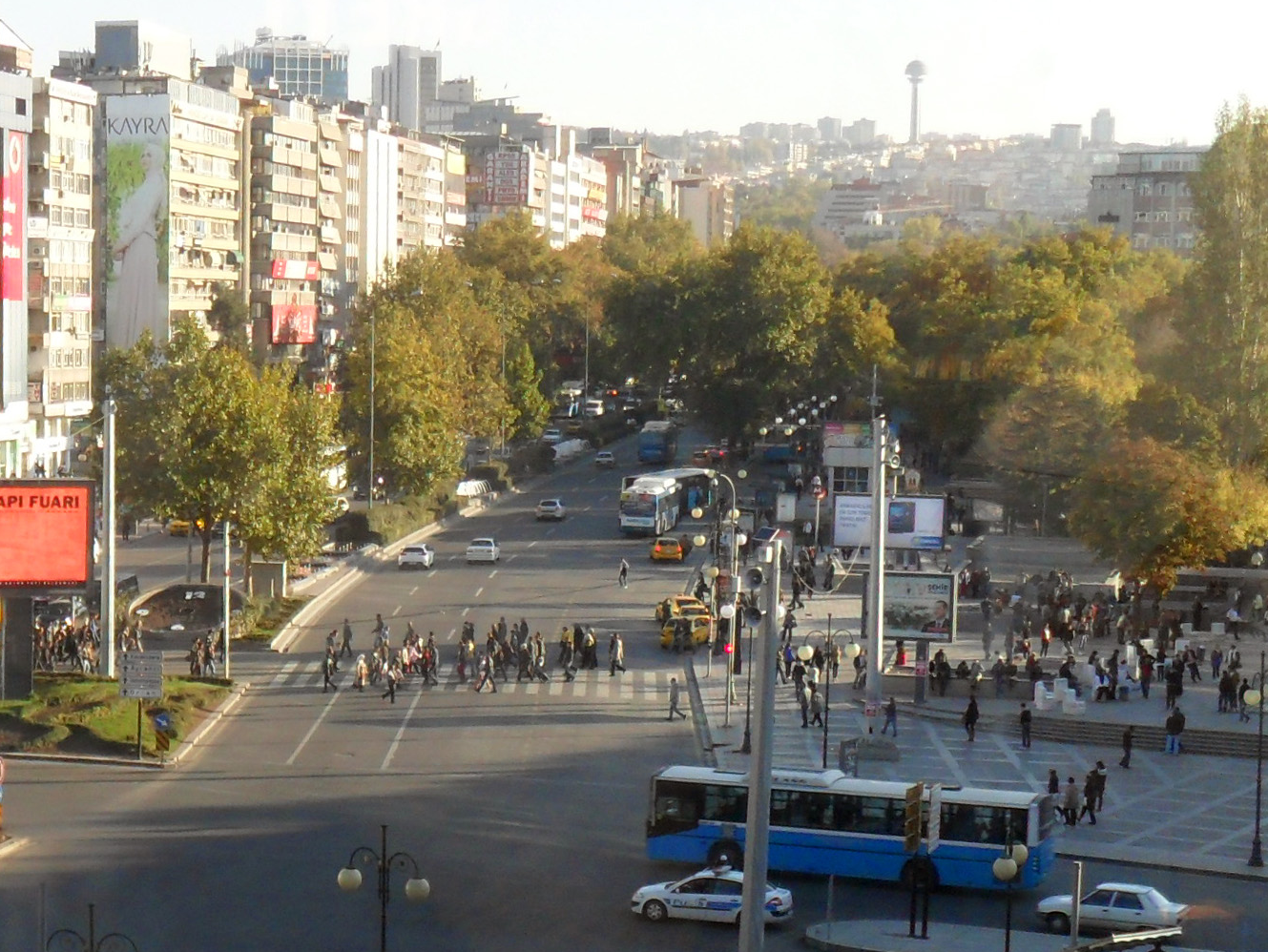
Site of car bombing in March 2016.

At 18:45 local time on March 13, 2016, a car bomb exploded in a side street of Güvenpark, where bus stops are situated. During the explosion, 37 people were killed and more than 100 injured. This was the third terror attack in Ankara within six months.

The question was raised whether the attack was aimed at the Çevik Kuvvet stationed in the park.
