= Kızılay, Ankara =

Kızılay
- Neighbourhood
- Location in Turkey Kızılay (Turkey Central Anatolia)
- Coordinates: 39°55′N 32°51′E
- Country: Turkey
- Province: Ankara
- District: Çankaya
- Population (2022): 1,311
- Time zone: UTC+3 (TRT)

Kızılay is the city center of Ankara Province in the municipality and district of Çankaya, Turkey. Its population is 1,311 (2022). It is named after the Kızılay Derneği (Turkish Red Crescent) whose former headquarters was located at the Kızılay Square.

Güvenpark in Kızılay is the center park and a common meeting location which occasionally serves the population as a recreational area. Ankara Metro, Ankaray and the bus stops nearby, provide easy access to other parts of the city.

On March 13, 2016, Kızılay suffered a terrorist bombing which killed 37 people and injured 125. The bombing took place on Atatürk Boulevard near Güvenpark.

== Demographics ==
Historical population
Year	Pop.	±% p.a.
2007	1,125	—
2012	1,846	+10.41%
2017	1,356	−5.98%
2022	1,311	−0.67%
Source: TÜIK (2007–2022)

== Gallery ==
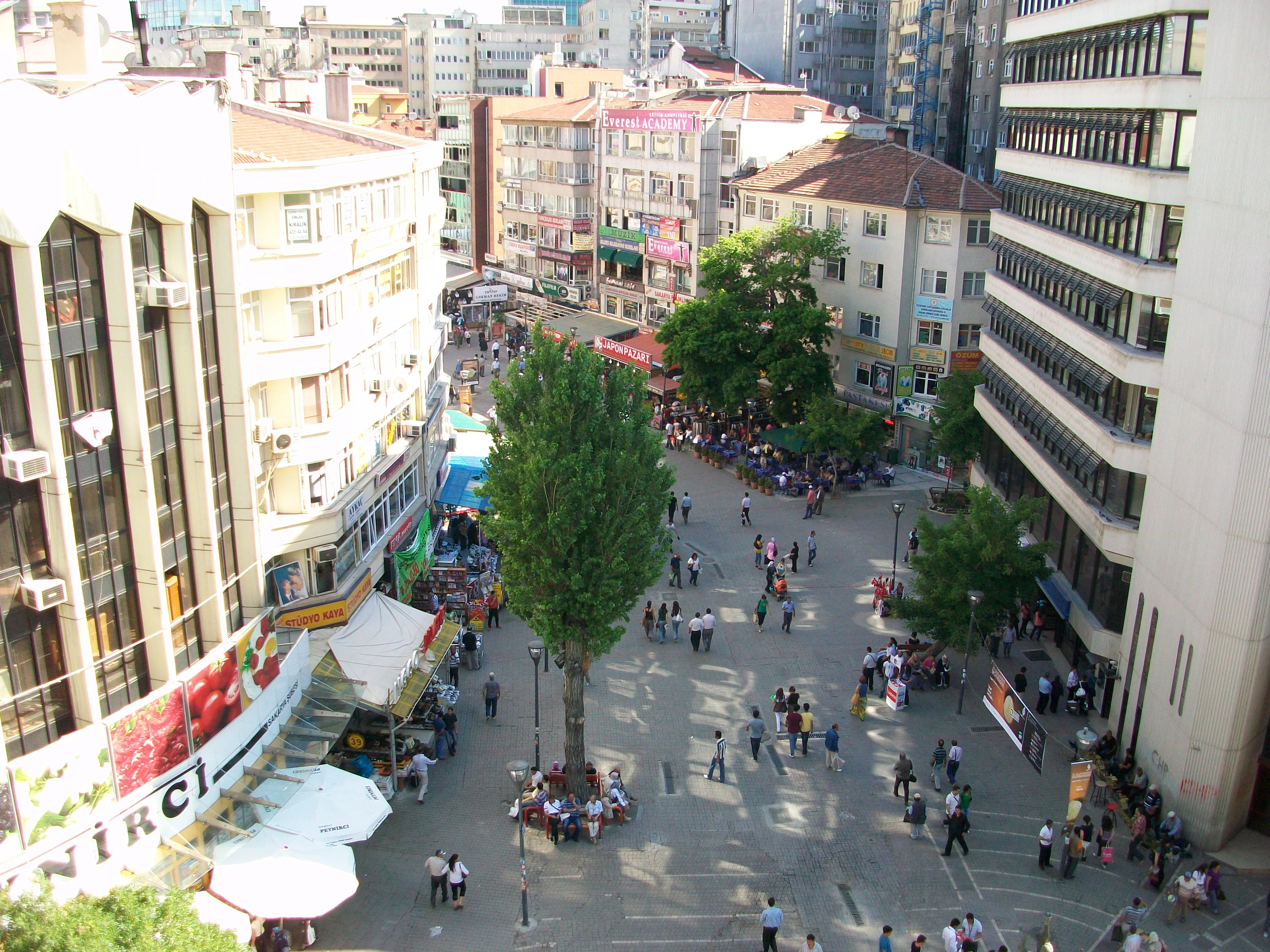
Selanik Street and Kızılay Square

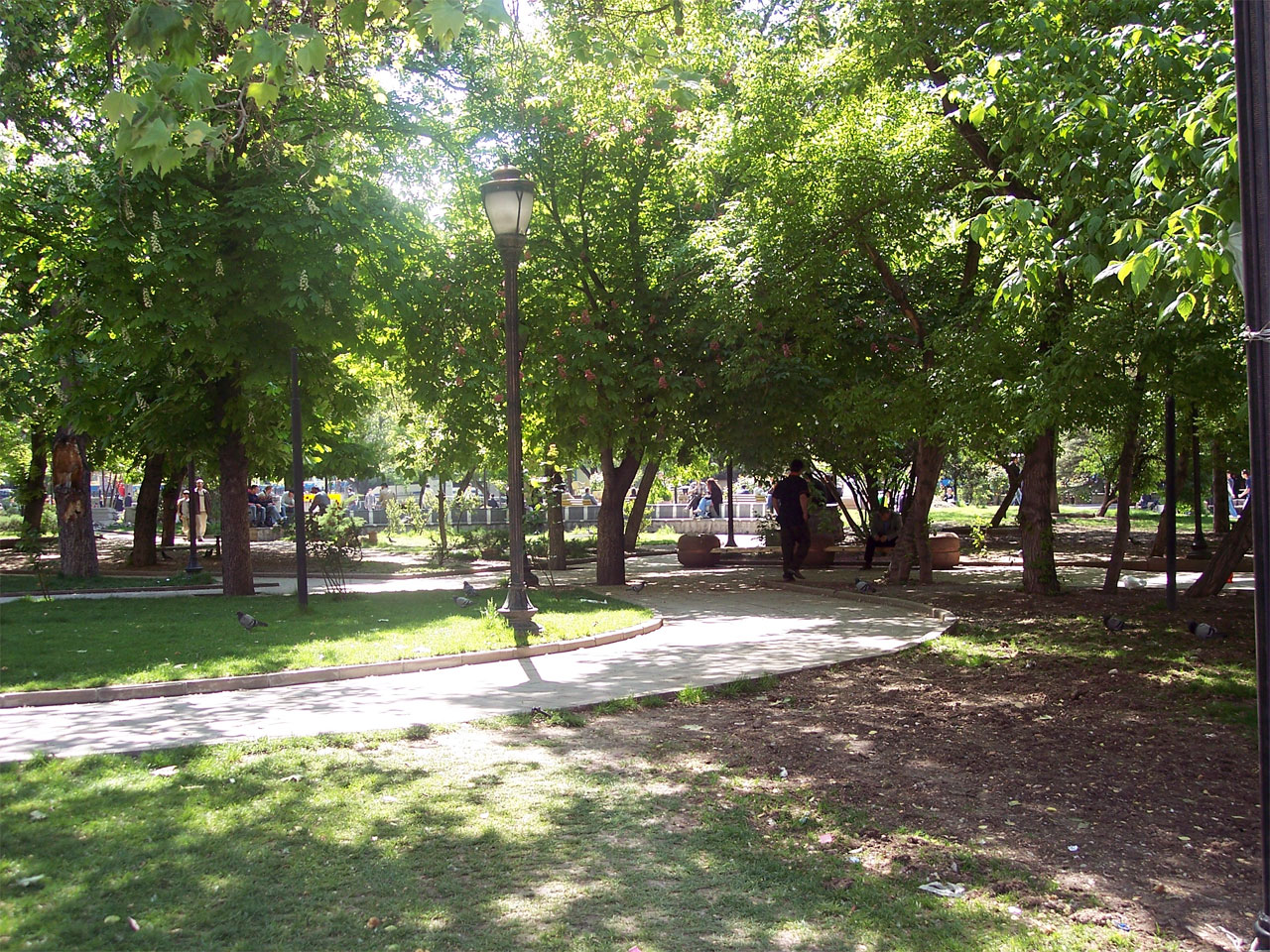
Güven Park, 2006

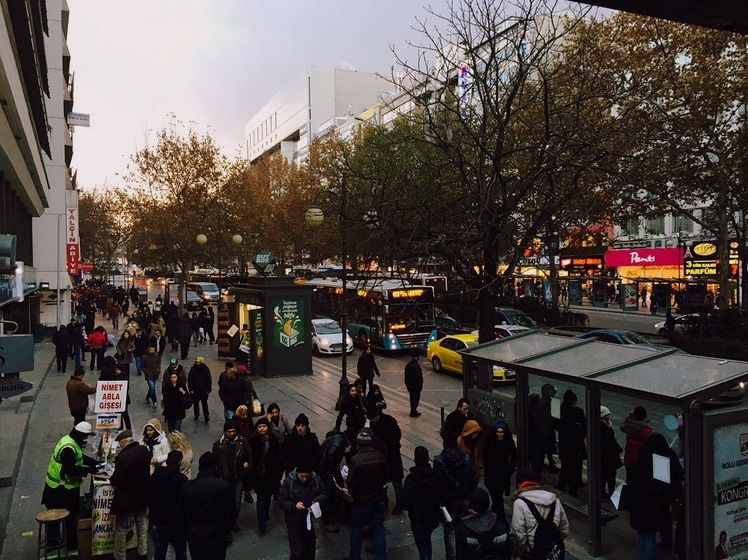
Atatürk Boulevard
