= Security Monument =

Sculpture in Ankara

Coordinates: 39°55′12″N 32°51′12″E

- Turkish: Güvenlik Anıtı, Emniyet Abidesi
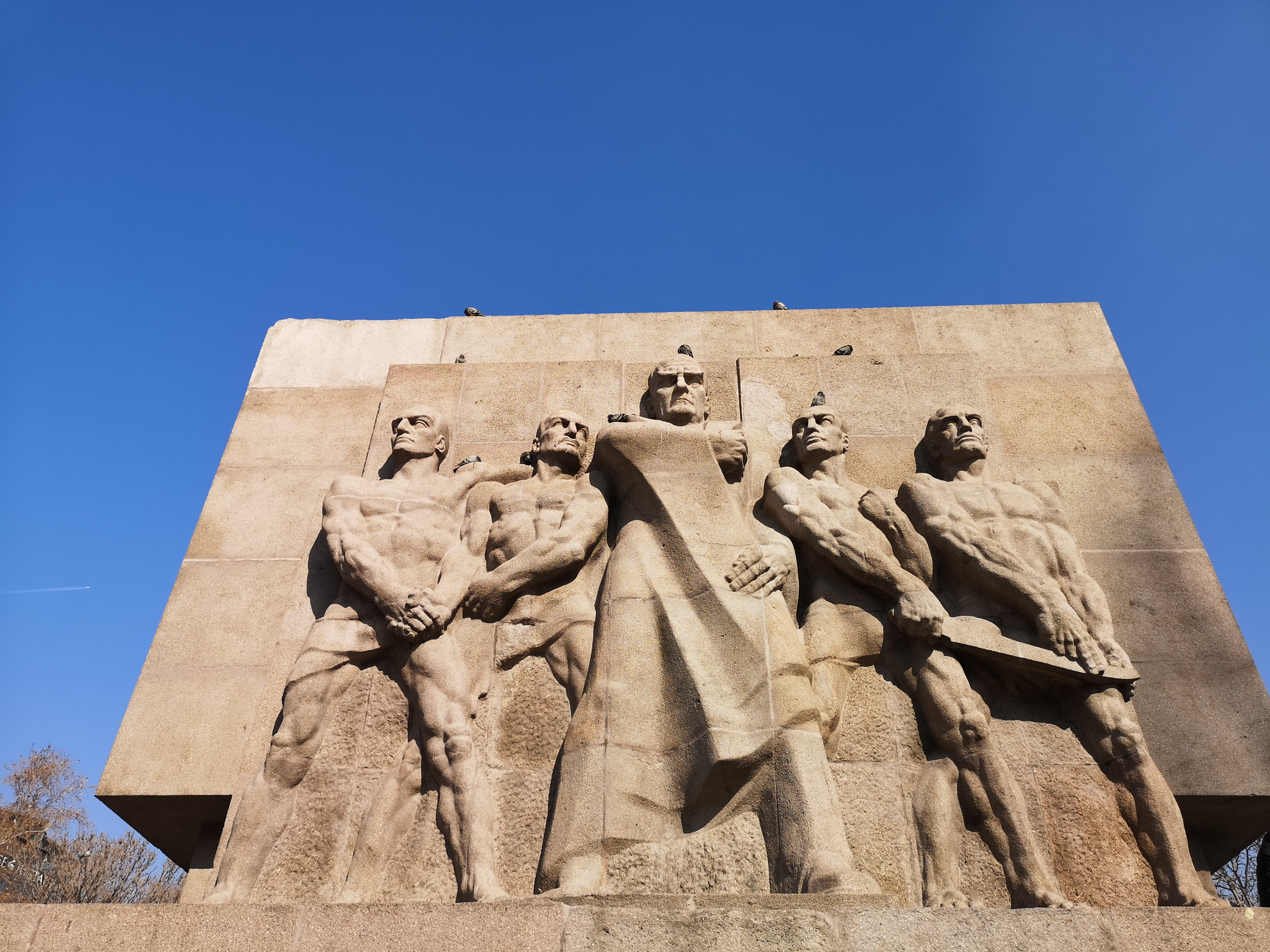
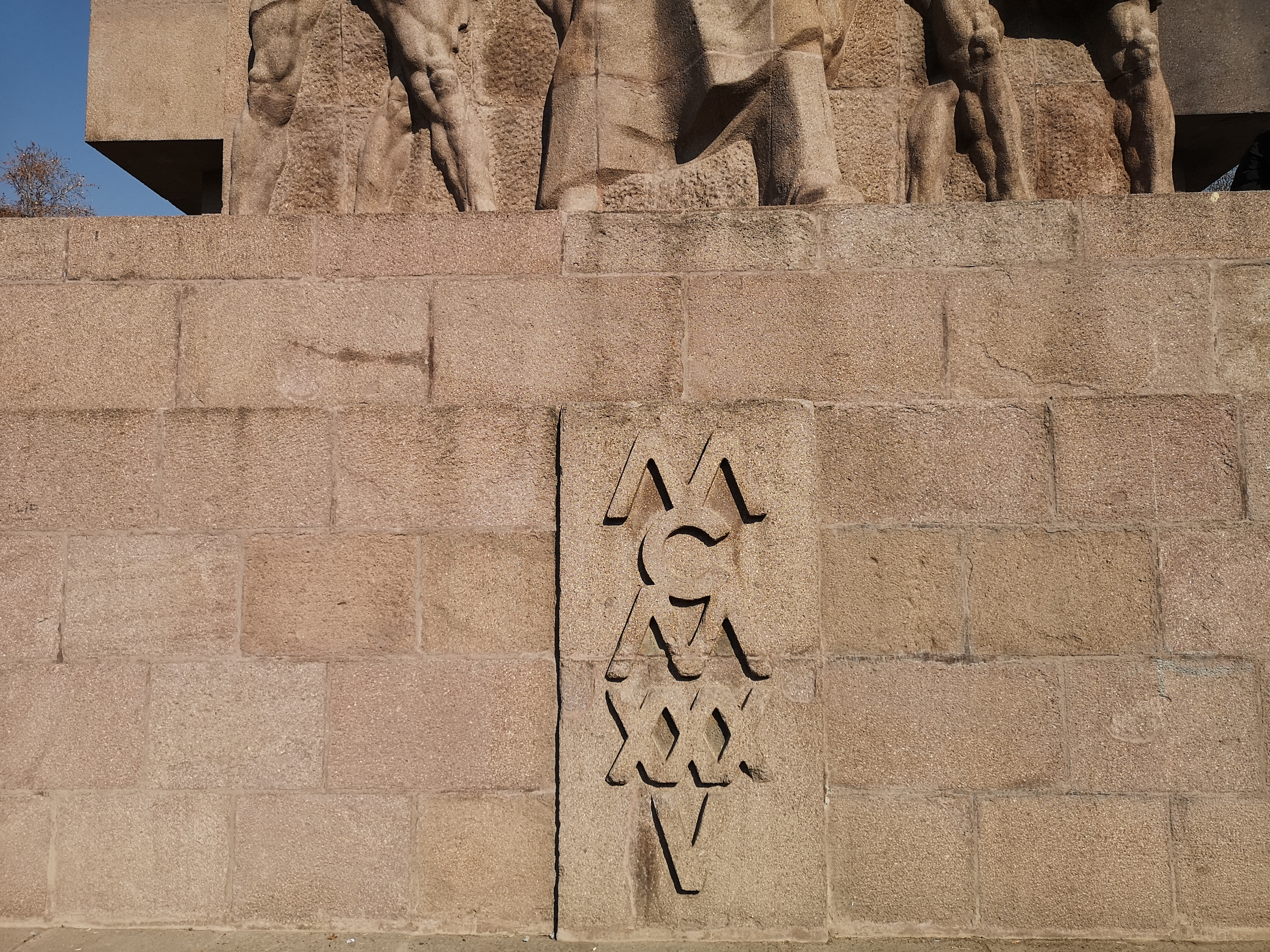
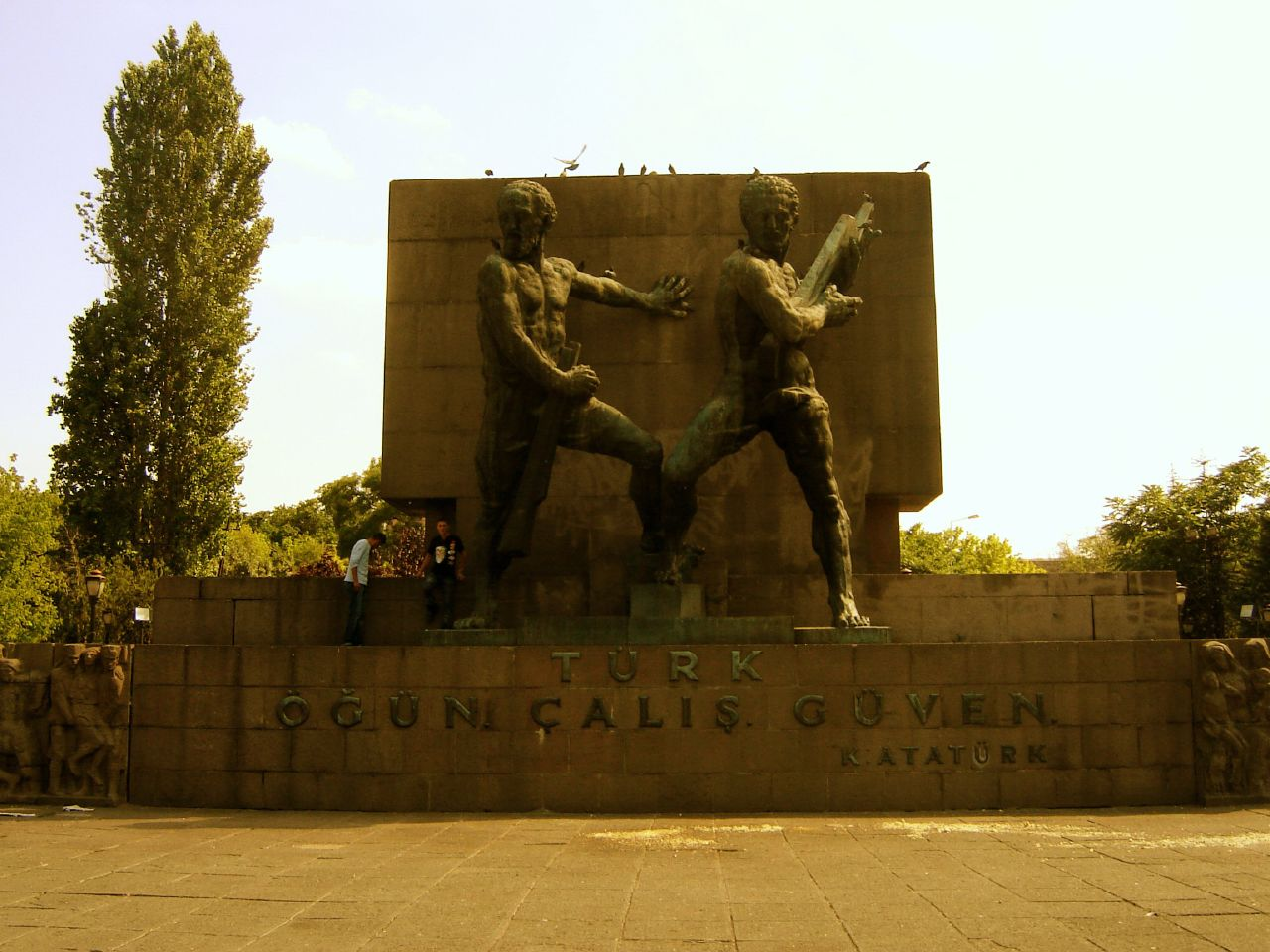
- Artist: Designed by Clemens Holzmeister, built by Anton Hanak and Josef Thorak
- Year: 1935
- Location: Ankara

Security Monument Güvenlik Anıtı (Turkish) is installed in Güvenpark of Ankara, Turkey. It was built in 1935. The sculpture is a gratuity to the Turkish police. Security Monument was designed by Clemens Holzmeister. The front of the sculpture was built by Anton Hanak, and later, after his sudden death, the sculpture was completed by Josef Thorak.
