= Gazi Mustafa Kemal Boulevard, Ankara =

Gazi Mustafa Kemal Boulevard
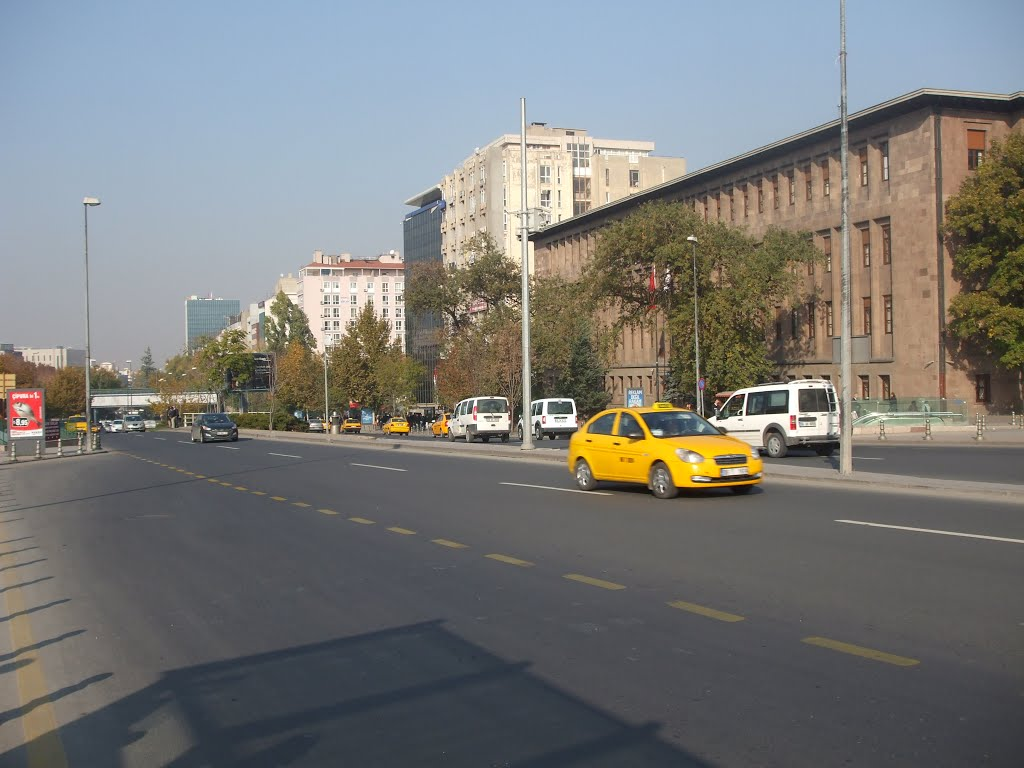
- Interactive map of Gazi Mustafa Kemal Boulevard
- Native name: Gazi Mustafa Kemal Bulvarı (Turkish)
- Length: 2.2 km (1.4 mi)
- Location: Ankara, Turkey
- Coordinates: 39°55′24″N 32°50′57″E
- From: Anadolu Square, (formerly: Tandoğan Square), Yenimahalle
- To: Kızılay Square, Çankaya

Gazi Mustafa Kemal Boulevard (Turkish: Gazi Mustafa Kemal Bulvarı), abbreviated as GMK Boulevard, is a boulevard connecting Anadolu Square (formerly: Tandoğan Square) in Yenimahalle with Kızılay Square in Çankaya of Ankara, Turkey. The 2.2 km (1.4 mi) long boulevard runs in northwest–southeast direction. It is named after Mustafa Kemal Atatürk (1881–1938), the founder of Turkish Republic.

Office buildings of some branches of the Ministry of Transport, Maritime and Communication, such as Undersecretariat for Maritime Affairs (Turkish: Denizcilik Müsteşarlığı), Aviation and Space Technologies (Turkish: Havacılık ve Uzay Teknolojileri) and Civil Aviation (Turkish: Sivil Havacılık), are located on the boulevard.
