= Kahramanlar Business Center =

Building in Ankara, Turkey

Coordinates: 39°55′13″N 32°51′17″E

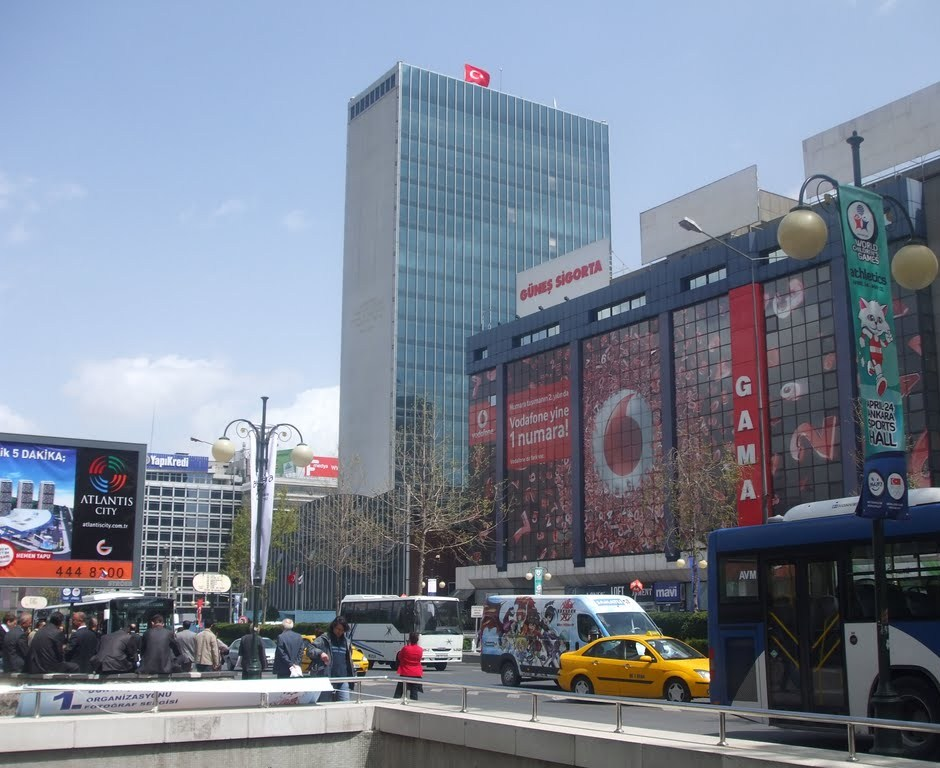
Kahramanlar Business Center (1959–1965) at Kızılay Square in Ankara was one of the first International Style highrise buildings in Turkey.

Kahramanlar Business Center (Turkish: Kahramanlar İş Merkezi), originally known between 1959 and 2015 as Emek Business Center (Turkish: Emek İşhanı), is a 24 storey highrise building at Kızılay Square in Ankara, Turkey.

Inspired by the Lever House building in New York City, it was designed in 1959 as one of the first International Style highrise buildings in Turkey. At the time of its completion in 1965, it was the tallest building in Ankara.

== Construction ==
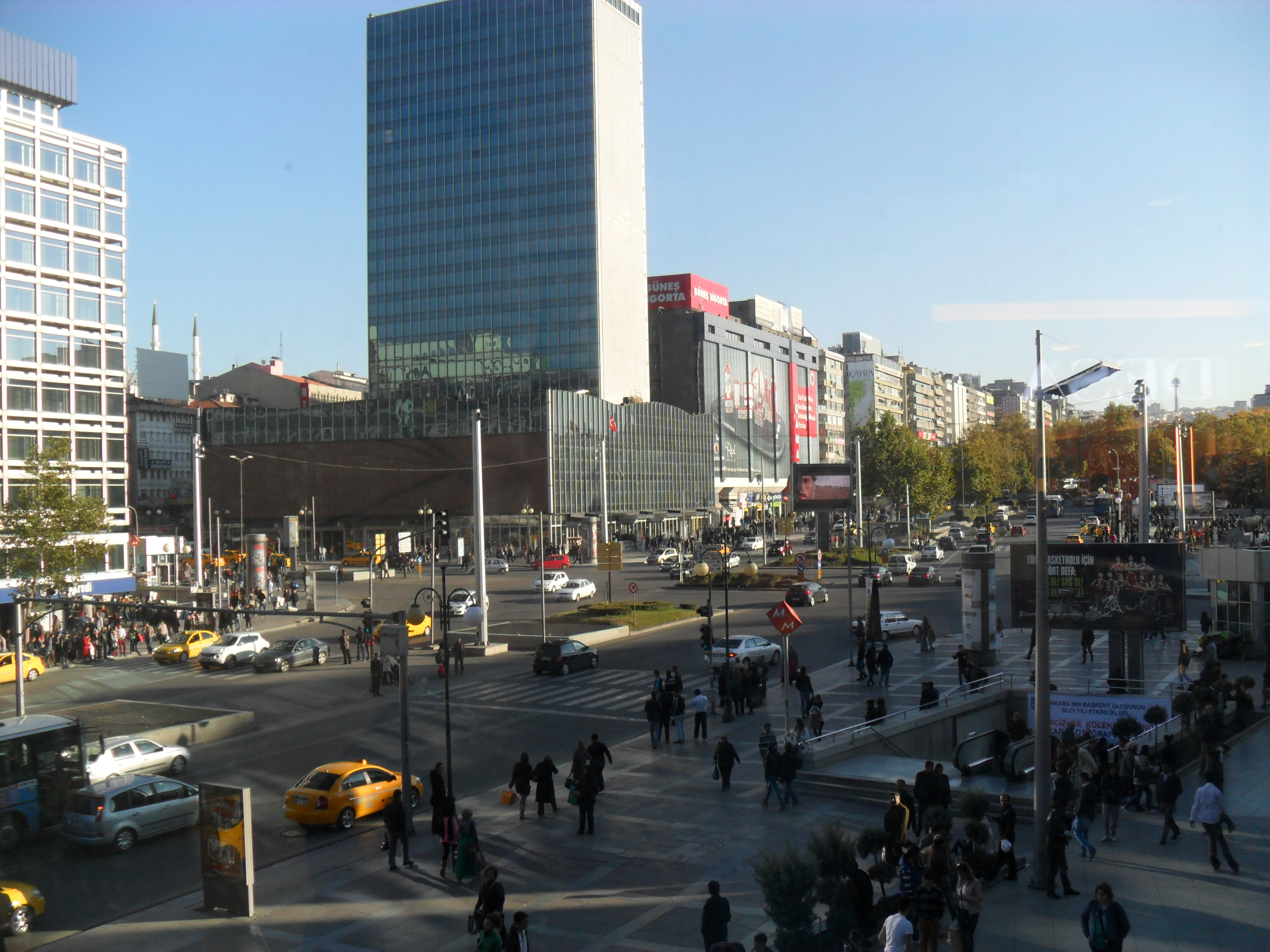
Another view of Kahramanlar Business Center (1959–1965) at Kızılay Square in central Ankara.

The building was commissioned by the Emekli Sandığı (Pension Fund, abbreviated as Emek) bound to the Social Security Administration of Turkey, and was built between 1959 and 1965 as a revenue generating property. The architects were Enver Tokay and İlhan Tayman, and the statics engineer was Yusuf Berdan.

It was one of the first International Style highrise buildings in Turkey, and the first with a glass curtain wall facade. Its design was primarily inspired by the Lever House (1952) building, blended with some of the facade characteristics of the United Nations Secretariat Building (1952) in New York City.

The ground floor and the first two floors were designed as a shopping center, while the other floors were reserved for offices. The building is situated to the southeast of Kızılay Square, opposite to the Kızılay (Turkish Red Crescent) building, which gives the square its name.

Construction works temporarily stopped due to the 1960 coup d'état, which delayed the completion and opening date to 1965.

== Privatization ==
On March 8, 2006, the Privatization Board of Turkey sold the building for $55,500,000 to Talip Kahraman Construction Co. The building was renamed as Kahramanlar Business Center in November 2015.

== List of 50 projects ==
Turkish Chamber of Civil Engineers lists Kızılay Emek Business Center as one of the fifty civil engineering feats in Turkey, a list of remarkable engineering projects realized in the first 50 years of the chamber.

== See also ==
- United Nations Secretariat Building (1947–1952)
- Lever House (1950–1952)
- Pirelli Tower (1956–1958)
- Europa-Center (1963–1965)
- International Style
- Architecture of Turkey
