= Kızılay Square =

Urban square in Ankara, Turkey

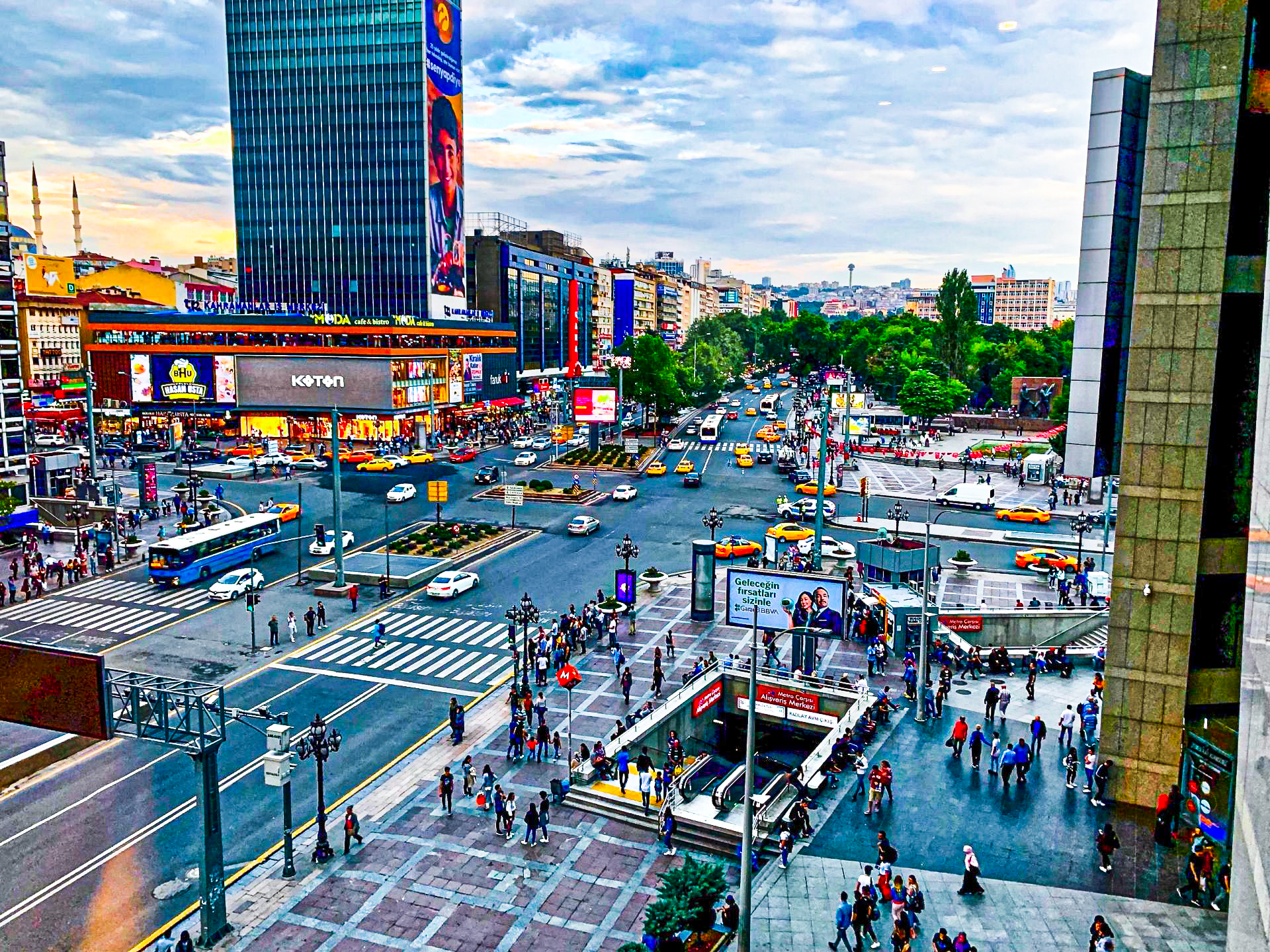
Kızılay Square with Emek Business Center on the left, Güvenpark and Kızılay AVM on the right side.

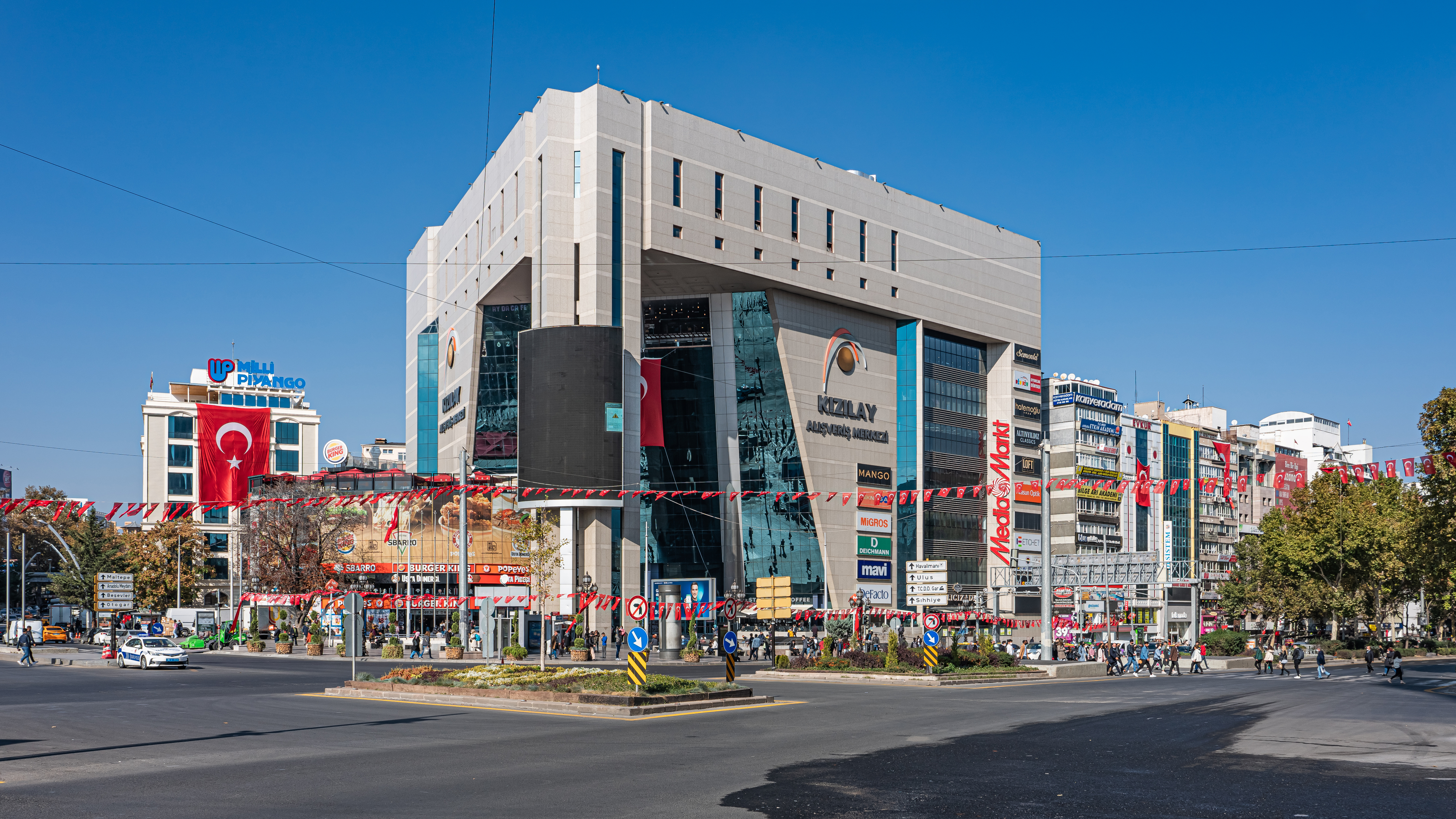
A view of the Kızılay AVM Shopping Center at Kızılay Square

July 15 Kızılay National Will Square (Turkish: 15 Temmuz Kızılay Millî İrade Meydanı), originally Kızılay Square (Kızılay Meydanı), is one of the most important centers and junction points of Ankara, Turkey.

== Geography ==
The square at 39°55′N 32°51′E is the intersection of two major boulevards. Atatürk Boulevard (Turkish: Atatürk Bulvarı) running from south to north is popularly called the "Protocol Road". The east part of the other boulevard is named Ziya Gökalp Boulevard (formerly Kazım Özalp Boulevard) and the west part is named Gazi Mustafa Kemal Boulevard. Kahramanlar Business Center (formerly Kızılay Emek Business Center) is situated to the southeast and Güven Park is situated to the southwest of the square. The Kızılay AVM shopping mall, which replaced the former Kızılay (Turkish Red Crescent) headquarters, is situated to the northwest.

== History ==
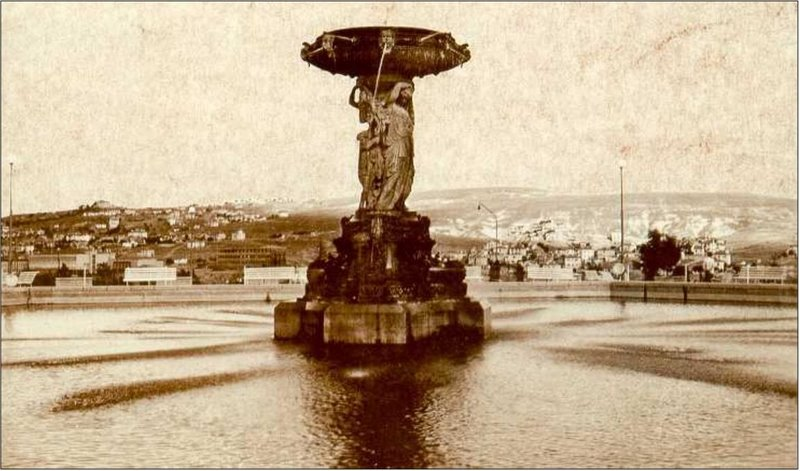
Kızılay Square, with the later relocated Su Perileri (Water Fairies) monumental fountain, c. 1930.

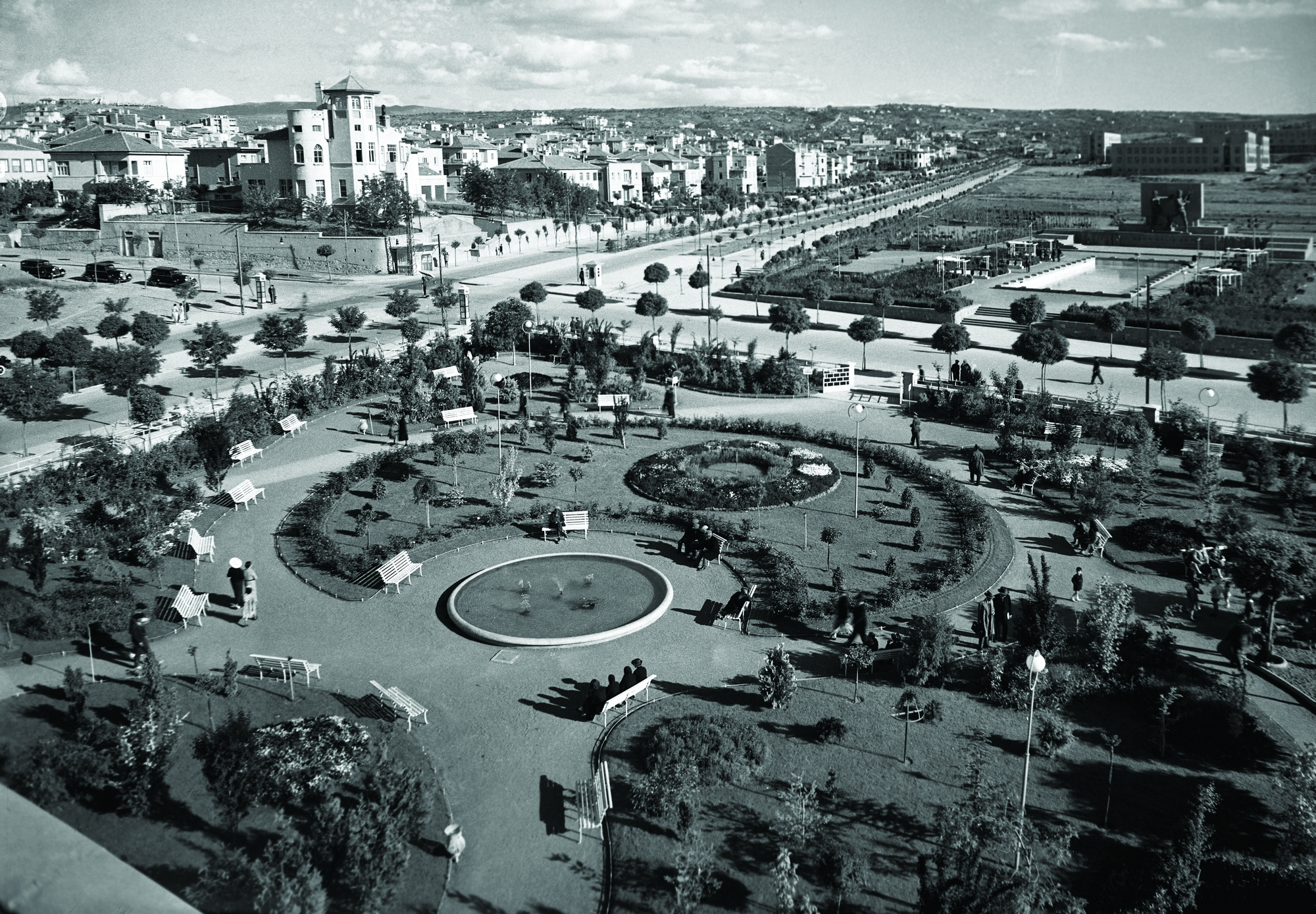
A view of the Kızılay Park and Güven Park in the 1940s, with the Cemil Ubaydın Mansion in the background, at left.

The square was named Kızılay (meaning "Red Crescent" in Turkish) after the Turkish Red Crescent headquarters, which was built on its northwest in 1929.

The Red Crescent building was demolished in 1993 and replaced by the present-day Kızılay AVM shopping mall, which – after a long legal process regarding its ownership rights – was opened in 2011.)

In those years, the city center was located to the north of Kızılay, but Ankara was redesigned by a group of urban planners including Hermann Jansen.

After the development of the new quarters, the center of the city eventually shifted toward the neighborhoods around the square, and in fact those quarters are now known as Kızılay.

After the 27 May 1960 coup d'état it was formally renamed as Liberty Square (Hürriyet Meydanı); but the popular use of Kızılay Square continued.

Following the failed coup attempt of 15 July 2016, Ankara Metropolitan Municipality initially decided on 26 July 2016 to rename the square as July 15 Kızılay Democracy Square (15 Temmuz Kızılay Demokrasi Meydanı), which was later amended as July 15 Kızılay National Will Square on 9 August 2016. It is still commonly known as Kızılay Square among the resident population of the city.

== Transportation ==
Kızılay is a stop in the routes of most of the public buses operating both in the south–north and east–west directions. Kızılay is also the terminus of the M1, M2 and M4 lines of the Ankara Metro. The station of the Ankaray light rail is located below the metro terminal. Kızılay is a central station of Ankaray which connects the northeast of Ankara to the west of the city center.

== See also ==
- Architecture of Turkey
