= Atatürk Boulevard =

Most important avenue in Ankara, Turkey

Atatürk Boulevard (Turkish: Atatürk Bulvarı) is an avenue in Ankara, Turkey.

== Geography ==
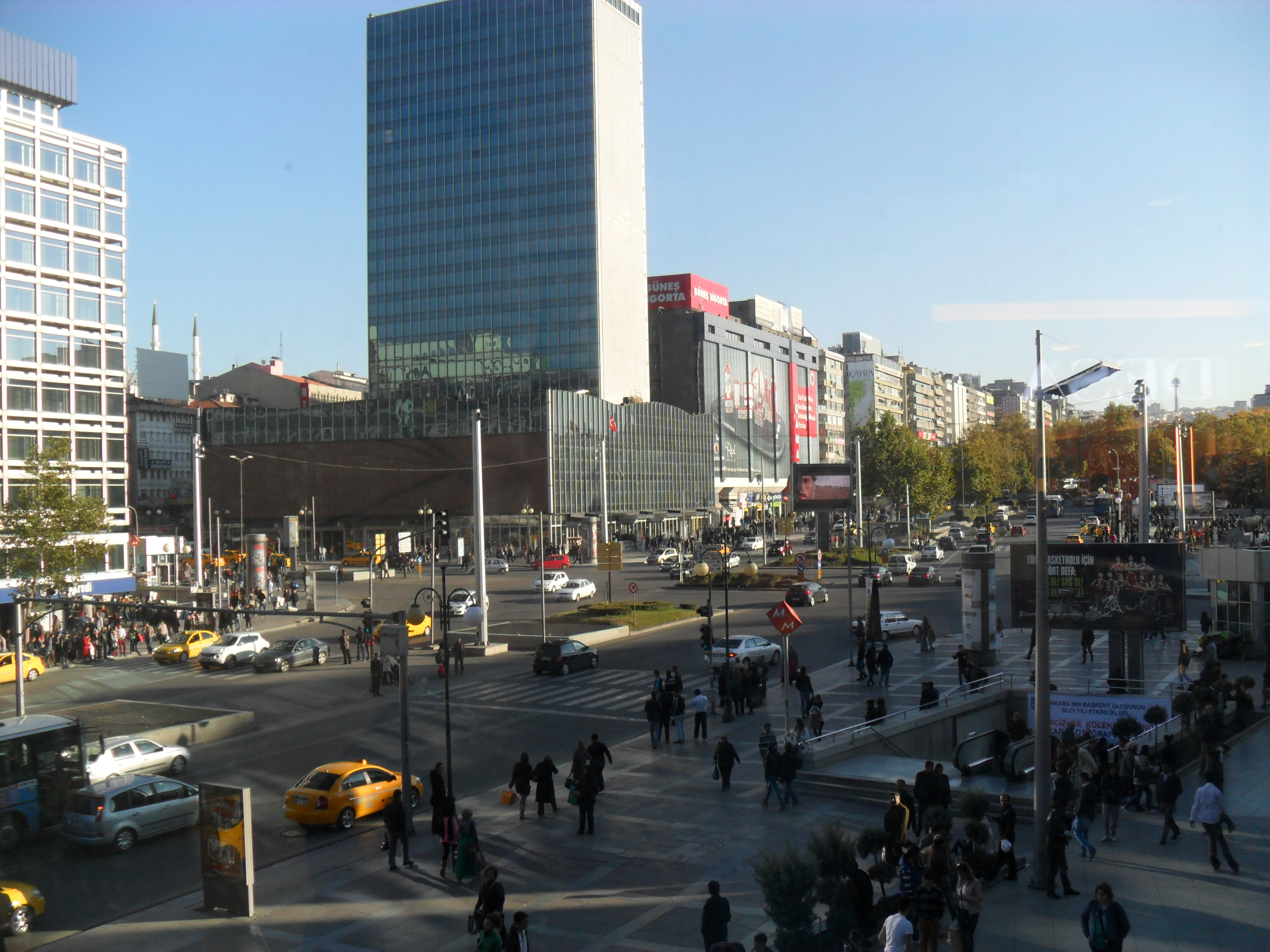
Kızılay Square

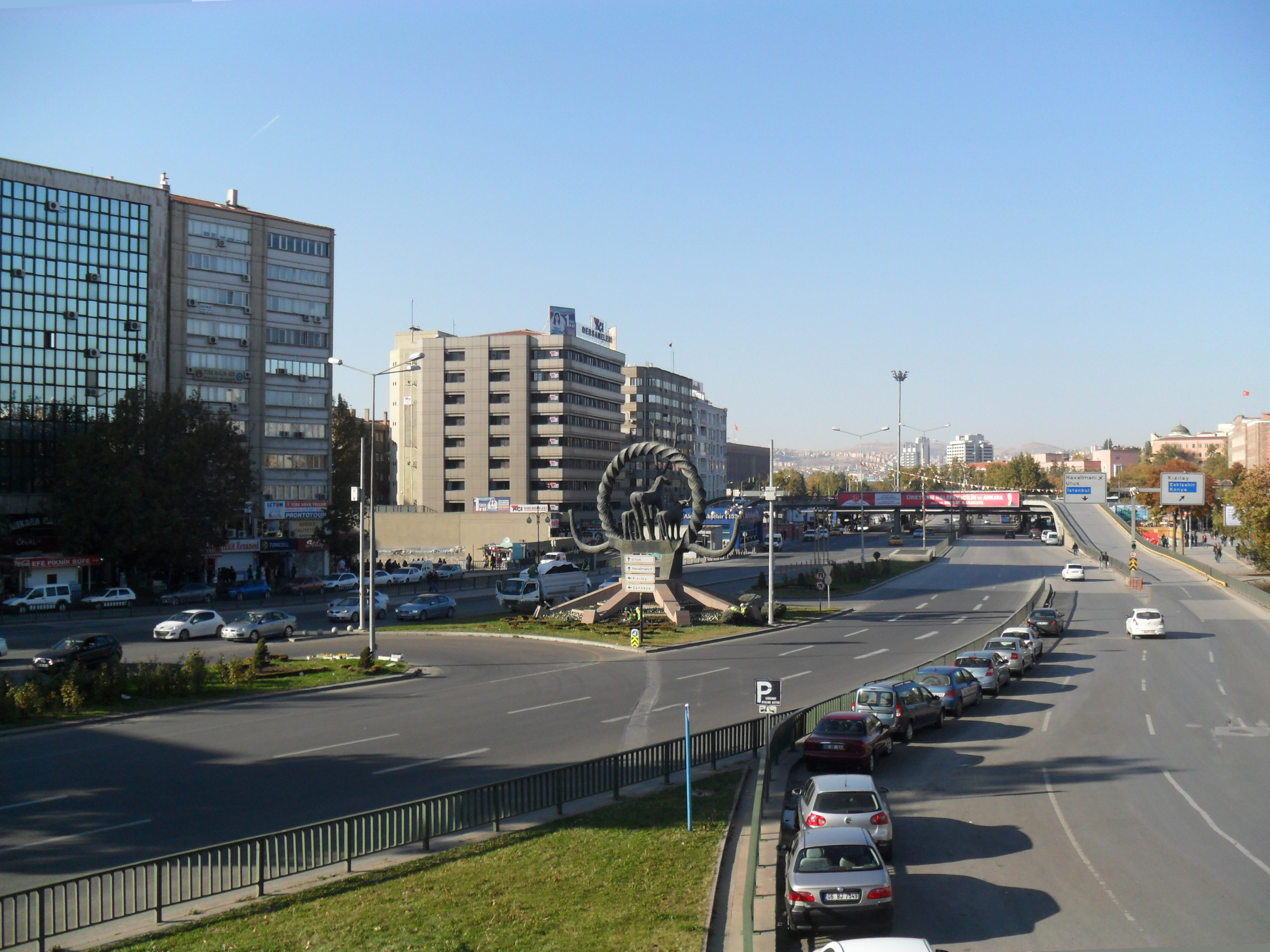
Sıhhiye Square

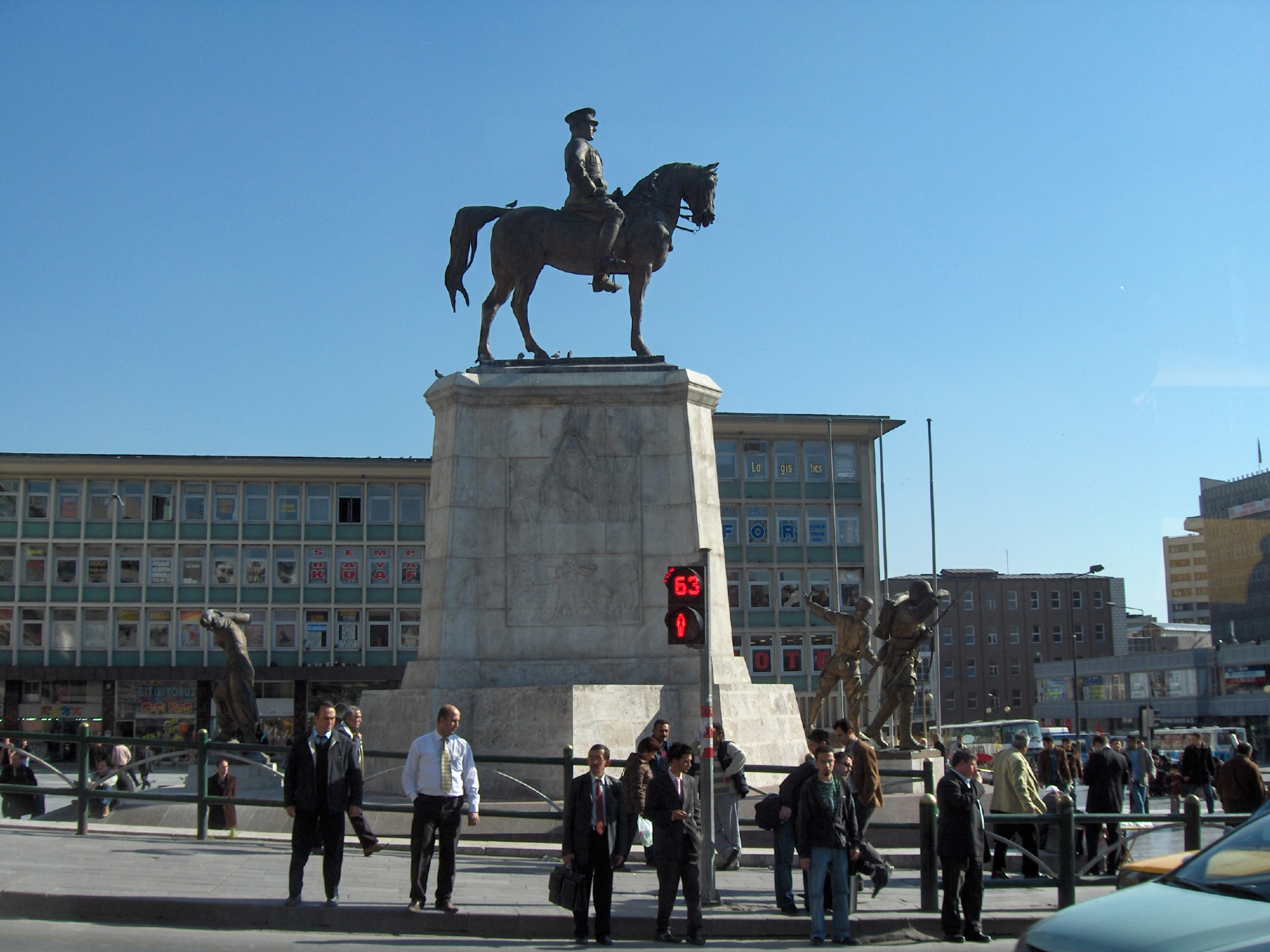
Ulus Square

The boulevard runs about 5,600 metres (18,400 ft) in the south to north direction. At the southernmost point it intersects with Çankaya Boulevard and at the northernmost point it merges to Çankırı Street. Its width is about 30 metres (98 ft).

== History ==
After the Turkish Republic was proclaimed, Ankara was redesigned by a group of urban planners including Hermann Jansen. Atatürk Boulevard was developed after this planning. But according to Falih Rıfkı Atay, the original plan was implemented after much alterations.

== The squares on the boulevard ==
Beginning from the south the first big square is to the west of Kuğulu Park a small but a popular public park known for its swan lake. The second square is on the intersection with Eskişehir Boulevard which leads to ringroad around Ankara. Both squares have underpasses to ease the traffic flow. Kızılay Square is usually considered to be the center of Ankara. It is also the terminus of Ankara subway line from the north and also the middle station of Ankaray (lighter version of subway). Zafer Square is known by a statue of Atatürk. Sıhhiye Square is one of the busiest transportation points of Ankara with buses, subway and train. The Hitit Anıtı (Hittite Monument) is also in Sıhhiye Square. Northern still are the İtfaiye Square and Ulus Square. In Ulus Square there is a Monument of Victory, with Atatürk as its centerpiece.

== Main buildings ==
In the southern half of the boulevard there are many embassy buildings. Turkish parliament is to the west of the boulevard. The main buildings of most of the ministries are on the boulevard. Some of these buildings were designed by the Austrian architect Clemens Holzmeister Some ministries are now housed in newer buildings on the Eskişehir Boulevard, while others are still housed in the old buildings. This neighborhood of Ankara is known as Bakanlıklar ("Ministries"). Ankara Radio building of Turkish Radio and Television Corporation is to the east of the boulevard. Ankara Opera House and Gençlik Parkı, the biggest park in the urban fabric of Ankara, is on the west of the boulevard.
