= Hermann Jansen =

German architect

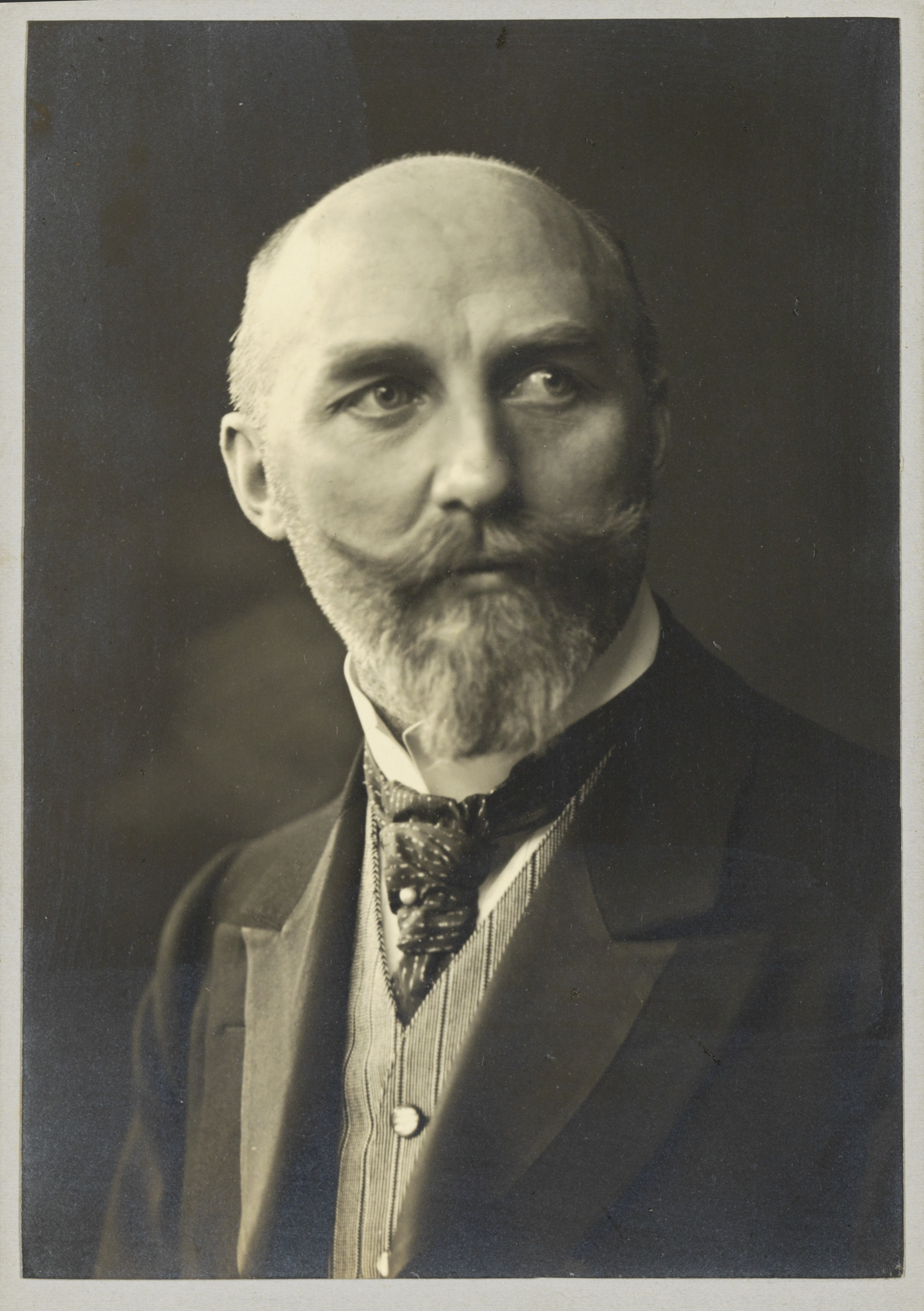
Hermann Jansen in March 1910

Hermann Jansen (28 May 1869 in Aachen – 20 February 1945 in Berlin) was a German architect, urban planner and university educator.

== Early life, study and work ==
Hermann Jansen was born in 1869, the son of the pastry chef Francis Jansen and his wife Maria Anna Catharina Arnoldi. After visiting the humanistic Kaiser-Karls-Gymnasium in Aachen, Jansen studied architecture at RWTH Aachen University in Karl Henrici (de). After graduation in 1893, Jansen worked in an architectural office in Aachen.

1897 drew Jansen to Berlin, and in 1899 created his own business with the architect William Mueller (de). In the same year he made the designs for the later-named Pelzer tower (de) in his home town of Aachen. In 1903 he took over the publication of the architecture magazine "The Builder" (1903–1916), which was first published in 1902 in Munich.

== "Greater Berlin" and the General Town Planning Exhibition ==
In the years prior to 1908, the District of Berlin and its surrounding towns and cities had witnessed immense growth due to private investment. Due to the unplanned nature of growth in the city, several key urban challenges surfaced. These included the provision of housing, capacity for efficient transport, and the demand for public open spaces. With pressures mounting, the city saw planning a means of directing growth, and in 1908 put forth the ‘Groẞ-Berlin' (Greater Berlin) competition. The competition required planners and architects to put forth design that would link central Berlin with surrounding towns in the regions to form a metropolis, spanning from the historic center to outer suburbs.

Jansen was among the planners who submitted a comprehensive plan for a Greater Berlin, and when the competition closed in 1910 his was awarded equal first place. Jansen's proposal, later dubbed "The Jansen-plan" stood as the first comprehensive plan ever to be commissioned for Greater Berlin. Under the Jansen plan, development of Berlin would be arranged around a small inner ring and a larger outer ring of green space comprising parks, gardens, forests and meadows, which would then be connected via green-corridors radiating outward from the compact inner-city. The central focus of green space in Jansen's design was well received and laid the foundation for the creation and safeguarding of open spaces across Berlin.

In addition to his focus on public space, Jansen's plan received accolades for the attention drawn to overcrowding in central Berlin, with a proposed fast transport system aimed at integrating the center of the city with peripheral areas. What made this aspect of Jansen's plan for Berlin so popular was the creation of socially positive dwellings in areas of urban expansion. These dwellings came in the form of single houses within small settlements with the intention of creating new opportunities for Berlin's less-privileged social classes to live outside the city center. However, due to the onset of World War I, Jansen's plan was only partially implemented, however, evidence of his work can still be found to some extent in the cityscape.

Jansen's competition winning work was showcased at the General Town Planning Exhibition (Allgemeine Stadtebay-Ausstellung) held on 1 May 1910 at the Royal Arts Academy, known today as Berlin University of the Arts. The exhibition was among the first to ever give comprehensive account of planning and the built environment. Following its unexpectedly popular reception in Berlin many sections, including Jansen's plan, were featured at the Town Planning Conference in London later that year.

== Academic life and later work ==
In 1918, Jansen was in the Royal Prussian Academy of Arts in Berlin and recorded in their Senate and received the title of professor. On the occasion of his 50th Birthday, he was awarded an honorary doctorate by the Technical University in Stuttgart as the founder and leader of the modern urban art. He was a member of the Advisory Council of the Prussian cities Ministry of Public Works. He was a member of Architects of Berlin and the Association of German Architects (BDA).

In 1920, Hermann Jansen was appointed as associate professor of urban art at the Technische Hochschule Charlottenburg, later resigning in 1923.

Jansen in 1930 became professor of urban planning at the University of Arts Berlin.

He worked on and contributed to plans across Germany including; Emden, Minden, Goslar, Hameln, Osnabrück, Brandenburg, Bissingheim, Prenzlau, Neisse, Schwerin, Wałbrzych, Schweidnitz and many other small towns. Jansen also planned for foreign cities such as Riga, Łódź, Bratislava and Madrid.

In the 1930s he prepared a city plan for Mersin, Turkey, and in 1938 the Mersin Interfaith Cemetery was established in one of the locations that he proposed.

=== Ankara ===
Following the failure of existing urban planning measures to address the uncontrolled growth experienced in Turkey's newly established capital Ankara, 1927 saw the Turkish Government put forth an international competition to create a comprehensive development plan for the new city. The government invited three prominent European planners to the competition, Frenchman Léon Jaussely and Germans Joseph Brix and Hermann Jansen. In 1929 the competition concluded with the jury declaring Jansen's proposal to be the winner, following which he was commissioned with preparing detailed development plans for the capital city.

Jansen's master plan for Ankara placed particular emphasis on the historical context of the region, stressing the importance of the new settlement sitting adjacent to the existing old city rather than enveloping it within the new design. Jansen also called for the compulsory integration of green belts and areas within the city to promote a healthy urban environment, even extending this vision to the housing stock, which were designed to incorporate both front and rear gardens.

A defining feature of Jansen's master plan for Ankara was his division of the city into functionally specialized zones, which was an unfamiliar concept when compared to traditional Turkish urban form. This included 18 residential sections, each developed under different patterns; and industrial zones, of which the location was determined according to the provision of transport in the area. Jansen's master plan did not include a new commercial area; rather he acknowledged the significance of the old city center as a traditional place for commercial activity, choosing to reinforce its place as the center of life in Ankara. Unfortunately due to criticism and political intervention, the master plan of Ankara was never fully completed and Jansen requested that his signature be removed from the plan in 1938.
