= TRT HD =

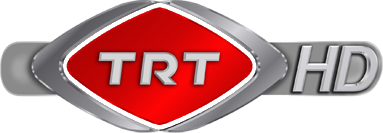
- Country: Turkey
- Broadcast area: Turkey, Europe, Asia
- Headquarters: Kızılay Square, Çankaya, Kızılay, Ankara

Programming
- Language: Turkish
- Picture format: 1080i (HDTV)

Ownership
- Owner: TRT
- Sister channels: TRT 1, TRT 2, TRT Haber, TRT 3, TRT Müzik, TRT Okul, TRT 6, TRT World, TRT Çocuk, TRT Türk, TRT Avaz, TRT Belgesel, TRT Arabi

History
- Launched: 24 May 2010; 15 years ago
- Closed: 1 February 2016; 9 years ago

Links
- Website: Official TRT website

TRT HD was the second HD television channel of TRT after TRT 3 HD. It was launched on 24 May 2010. It broadcasts events such as the Eurovision Song Contest in HD.
