= TRT 4 =

- Country: Turkey
- Broadcast area: Turkey
- Affiliates: Radyo Nağme
- Headquarters: Kızılay Square, Çankaya, Kızılay, Ankara

Programming
- Picture format: 576i (4:3 SDTV)

Ownership
- Owner: TRT
- Sister channels: TRT 1 TRT 2 TRT 3 TRT World; TRT Haber; TRT Spor; TRT Spor Yildiz; TRT Avaz; TRT Çocuk; TRT Belgesel; TRT Müzik; TRT Arabi; TRT Türk; TRT Kurdî; TRT 4K; TRT EBA TV; TBMM TV

History
- Launched: 30 July 1990; 36 years ago
- Closed: 31 January 2011; 15 years ago
- Replaced by: TRT Müzik
- Former names: 4. Kanal, TV4

Links
- Website: www.trt.net.tr

TRT 4 was a Turkish free-to-air television channel. The channel broadcast cultural and educational programs until 2008.

== History ==
TRT 4 started test transmissions on July 30, 1990 as "4. Kanal" or TV4, as an educational channel.

The channel broadcast educational programs (correspondence courses). As of the 2001 realignment, most programs were provided by the National Education Ministry and Anadolu University.

Afterward TRT 4 started broadcast the repeats of Turkish folk, documentaries and classical music programming.

From 1 November 2008, its broadcast times are: 21:00 - 07:00 (EET) after the release of TRT Çocuk, It has many subprograms. TRT 4 logo replaced TRT Çocuk logo during the program.

Currently TRT 4 shows programs of TRT Müzik channel.

== Close at night ==
During late 2008 to late 2009, TRT 4 is only channel of TRT that close to the testcard at night. While before that TRT 3 also close from 1am to 5am. And before 2003 TRT 1 and TRT 2 also close at night.

== Logos and identities ==
1990 to 1998

1998 to 2001

2001 to 2005

== See also ==
- Turkish Radio and Television Corporation
- List of television stations in Turkey
