= Television in Turkey =

The television industry in Turkey encompasses high-tech program production, transmission, and coverage. The Turkish Radio and Television Corporation (TRT) is Turkey's largest and most powerful national television network. As of 2022, there are 498 television channels in Turkey, ranking the country fourth in Europe in terms of total channel count. Turkey is the world's fastest-growing television series exporter and has overtaken both Mexico and Brazil to become the world's second-highest exporter of television dramas, behind only the United States. Turkish television drama has seen massive growth since the early 2000s. While the country has begun transitioning to digital terrestrial television networks, analog broadcasting historically remained widespread.

== History ==
=== Early years and monopoly ===
Television in Turkey was introduced in 1952 with the launch of ITU TV. The first experimental closed-circuit television broadcasts were prepared between June and July 1966. Turkey's first national television channel, TRT 1, began broadcasting in 1968. By 1972, TRT transmitted its service exclusively to Ankara four nights a week; however, viewers in border regions were frequently enticed by television channels broadcasting from neighboring countries. Sophisticated antennas targeting functional signals from Bulgaria were widely installed in Istanbul prior to the official launch of TRT's local service in the city.

Color television was introduced on 31 December 1980 and became the industry standard on 1 July 1984. During this transition period in 1983, the Turkish government rejected a commercial proposal from Polly Peck to assemble color television sets within the country. A second TRT channel, initially based out of Istanbul, followed in 1986. Leveraging rapid technological advancements and the global rise of satellite tech, TRT expanded its state monopoly by launching a third channel in 1989, a fourth channel dedicated to educational programming in 1990, and an international channel for the Turkish diaspora that same year.

=== Development of private television ===
In the mid-1980s, public discussions emerged regarding the creation of private television stations to end the state monopoly.

Turkey's first private television channel, Star 1, was established on 3 August 1989 by Magic Box Incorporated, a company registered in Germany. Prior to the wave of liberalization in the 1990s, broadcasting remained entirely under state control. The subsequent emergence of commercial television stations initially occurred without legal regulation; these new channels lacked formal operating licenses due to TRT's ongoing de facto monopoly. When Star 1 first aired, it utilized the physical studios and facilities of the German channel Sat.1 to deliver five hours of daily programming. This milestone triggered the launch of numerous other private channels, including Teleon, Show TV, HBB, Kanal 6, Cine 5, TGRT, Kanal D, ATV, and STV. To resolve the regulatory vacuum in the private sector, new legislation was enacted on 20 April 1994, officially terminating TRT's legal monopoly.

The contemporary Turkish television market is dominated by a handful of major networks, led by Kanal D, ATV, and Show TV, which command market shares of 14%, 10%, and 9.6%, respectively.

The two most common reception platforms are terrestrial and satellite. By the end of 2009, nearly 50% of households utilized satellite networks, with approximately 15% of those subscribers opting for premium pay services. Three providers primary dominate this multi-channel market: the satellite platforms Digiturk and D-Smart, and the cable infrastructure provider Türksat.

== Digital terrestrial television ==
Initial plans for Turkey's digital terrestrial television (DTT) infrastructure were drawn up on 28 August 1998 at Bilkent University. Subsequently, an Ankara Dikmen 1.5 kW DVB-T transmitter commenced test broadcasts on 1 December 2003.

Turkey began structural digital transmissions in February 2006. The Turkish government originally intended to manage a gradual analog switch-off, targeting a final completion date of March 2015. While the broadcasting regulator awarded an operating license to a private firm in 2013, the tender was cancelled in 2014 after the Constitutional Court (AYM) upheld a legal complaint against the administrative process. Although subsequent licensing frameworks have been proposed, Turkey lacked a functional, nationwide DTT network for several years.

Following the construction of modern digital broadcast infrastructure at Çamlıca Tower and the Çanakkale TV Tower, digital test broadcasts officially commenced in 2020. Long-term state plans outline the development of up to 40 additional transmitters across the country.

By late 2024, the full commercial implementation of digital terrestrial television in Turkey remained delayed due to postponed spectrum auctions. However, trial DVB-T2 multiplex transmissions were expanded at Çamlıca Tower. As of 2026, operational DVB-T2 test broadcasts have actively expanded into the Adana, İzmir, and İstanbul metropolitan areas. Despite these rollouts, DTT transmissions occupy a complex legal space; because formal DVB-T2 frequency bands have not been completely allocated by regulators, channels are broadcasting on legacy analog frequencies, creating ongoing regulatory conflicts.

== List of channels ==
=== Government channels (TRT - Turkish Radio and Television Corporation) ===
Channel	Category
TRT 1	General
TRT 2	Art and culture
TRT 3 (timesharing with TBMM TV)	Sports
TRT Haber	News
TRT Spor	Sports
TRT Spor Yıldız	Sports
TRT Çocuk	Children
TRT Diyanet Çocuk	Children
TRT Genç	Youth
TRT Müzik	Music
TRT Belgesel	Documentaries
TRT EBA TV	Education
TRT Türk	General
TRT Avaz	Programmes in Turkic
TRT Kurdî	Programmes in Kurdish
TRT Arabi	News in Arabic
TRT World	News in English
TBMM TV (timesharing with TRT 3)	Parliament

=== Government channels (Independent) ===
Channel	Category
Diyanet TV	General religious

=== Private national channels ===
Channel	Category
ATV	General
A2	General
Kanal D	General
NOW	General
Show TV	General
Show Max	General
Star TV	General
Kanal 7	General
TV2	General
TV8	General
TV8,5	General
360	General
TV4	General
Beyaz TV	General
Meltem TV	General
TYT Türk	General
24 TV	News
A Haber	News
A News	News in English
Akit TV	News
AS TV	News
Bengü Türk TV	News
CNN Türk	News
Ekol TV	News
Flash Haber	News
Haber Global	News
Habertürk TV	News
Halk TV	News
Kanal B	News
KRT TV	News
Lider Haber TV	News
NTV	News
Sözcü TV	News
Tele1	News
TGRT Haber	News
TH Türkhaber TV	News
TV5	News
TV100	News
TVNET	News
Ülke TV	News
Ulusal Kanal	News
A Para	Economy
Bloomberg HT	Economy
CNBC-e	Economy
Ekotürk	Economy
A Spor	Sports
beIN Sports	Sports
Ekol Sports	Sports
Eurosport	Sports
Fenerbahçe TV	Sports
sportstv	Sports
S Sport	Sports
Spor Smart	Sports
HT Spor	Sports
Tivibu Spor	Sports
TAY TV	Horse racing
TJK TV	Horse racing
SAT-7 Türk	General religious
FM TV	Religious
Semerkand TV	Religious
Cartoon Network	Children
Cartoonito	Children
Disney Channel	Children (closed, 2022)
Disney Jr.	Children
MinikaÇocuk	Children
MinikaGO	Children
Moonbug Kids	Children
Nickelodeon	Children
Nicktoons	Children
Nick Jr.	Children
Smart Çocuk	Children
Spacetoon	Children
Number 1 TV	Music
Powertürk TV	Music
Dream TV	Music
Dream Türk	Music
Kral Pop TV	Music
Animal Planet	Documentaries
beIN İZ	Documentaries
Discovery Channel	Documentaries
Discovery Science	Documentaries
Investigation Discovery	Documentaries
DMAX	Documentaries
National Geographic Channel	Documentaries
Nat Geo Wild	Documentaries
Yaban TV	Documentaries
TGRT Belgesel	Documentaries
beIN Movies	Movies
Movie Smart	Movies
Sinema TV	Movies
beIN Series	Series
Dizi Smart	Series
FX	American Series
TLC	American series
beIN H&E	Lifestyle and entertainment
beIN Gurme	Cookery
Food Network	Cookery
GZT TV	Art and culture
VAV TV	Art and culture

=== Most viewed channels ===
The most viewed television channels for 2024 are:

Rank	Channel	Group	Share of total viewing (%)
1	ATV	Turkuvaz Media Group (Kalyon Group)	9.49%
2	TV8	Acun Medya / Doğuş Group	7.43%
3	Show TV	Ciner Media Group (Ciner Group)	7.34%
4	NOW	Disney	6.71%
5	Kanal D	Demirören Group	6.28%
6	TRT 1	TRT	5.49%
7	Star TV	Doğuş Media Group (Doğuş Group)	5.15%
8	Kanal 7	New World Media Group	3.19%
9	TRT Çocuk	TRT	1.99%
10	TRT Haber	TRT	1.97%

== See also ==
- Radio in Turkey
- Turkish television drama
