= Radyo Çukurova =

Turkish regional radio network

- Type: Regional radio
- Country: Turkey
- Broadcast area: Çukurova and parts of south Turkey
- Headquarters: Adana

Ownership
- Owner: TRT
- Sister stations: Radyo 1 Radyo 2 Radyo 3 Radio World; Radyo Nağme; Radyo Türkü; Radyo Haber; Radyo Antalya; Radyo Erzurum; Radyo Trabzon; Ankara Radio; Radyo GAP

History
- Launch date: 3 March 1968; 58 years ago

Coverage
- Affiliates: TRT Müzik

Links
- Website: www.trt.net.tr

Radio Çukurova (Turkish: Radyo Çukurova or TRT Çukurova Radyosu) is a regional radio network of the Turkish Radio and Television Corporation (TRT).

== Geography ==
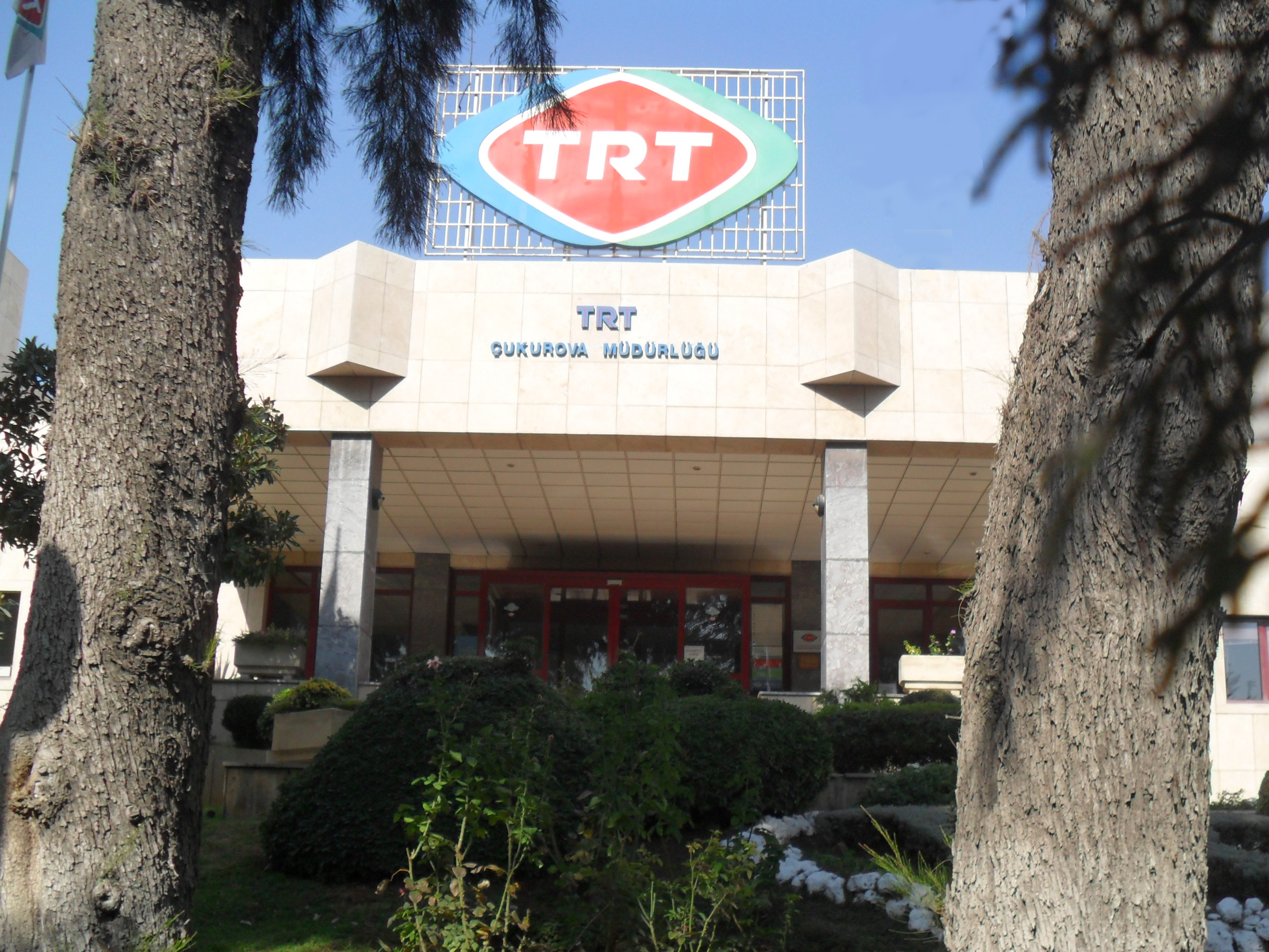
TRT Radio Çukurova building in Mersin, Turkey

The broadcast area includes the provinces of Mersin, Adana, Hatay, Osmaniye and parts of Kahramanmaraş, Kayseri, Niğde, Karaman and Konya. Since most of provinces are in Çukurova region (Cilicia of the antiquity) the network is named Çukurova. The radio studio is in Mersin and the main medium wave (MW) transmitter is in Kazanlı a suburb of Mersin. But there are also various FM transmitters frequencies of which are shown below.

== History ==
In 1962, a low power (2 kW) radio station was established for the city Adana. The transmitter which was housed next to radio studio was a Turkish-made transmitter. But then TRT decided to increase the broadcast area and the power. Thus a 300 kW transmitter was purchased from NEC a Japan -based company and a new transmitter station was established in Kazanlı. The studio was swiftly moved to Mersin and the regional network began transmission on 3 March 1968. The broadcast continued for 40 years. But in 2009, a new transmitter was purchased from Nautel, a Canada -based company.

== Studio and the production ==
In the early years Radyo Çukurova was a part of Radyo 1 network with some local production. Presently however, TRT Çukurova broadcasts regional programs during the morning hours up to 01 PM. It also collaborates with Radyo Türkü during the evening hours. The local production is carried in the TRT building in Mersin. TRT reporters and the service people to unattended transmitter stations also serve in the building.

== Frequencies ==
Frequency of the Middle-wave transmitter in Kazanlı is 630 kHz. The frequencies of the FM transmitters (1-5 kW TX output) are as follows.

Station	Province	Frequency, MHz.
Adana (main)	Adana	105.1
Yayladağ	Hatay	89.6
Hassa	Hatay	104.5
Hatay (main)	Hatay	93.6
Anamur	Mersin	101.8
Mersin	Mersin	93.1
Mersin (main)	Mersin	97.0
Yeşilkent	Kayseri	107.3
Hadim	Konya	94.0
Konya	Konya	103.2
Kahramanmaraş	Kahramanmaraş	99.8
Niğde (main)	Niğde	90.0
Ulukışla	Niğde	88.4
Karaman (main)	Karaman	96.4
Ermenek	Karaman	103.8
Küçükintilli	Osmaniye	103.8
Osmaniye	Osmaniye	107.7
