= TRT International =

TRT INT
- Country: Turkey
- Broadcast area: Ankara
- Headquarters: Kızılay Square, Çankaya, Kızılay, Ankara

Programming
- Picture format: 4:3 (576i, SDTV)

Ownership
- Owner: TRT

History
- Launched: 18 December 1990; 34 years ago
- Replaced: TRT Türk
- Closed: 13 June 2009; 15 years ago
- Former names: TRT International Eurasia

Links
- Website: www.trt.net.tr

TRT INT was a Turkish television station part of the TRT.

== About TRT INT ==
TRT INT started broadcasting in 1990 as TRT 5, and is now TRT's extensively watched TV station. As an international channel it broadcasts a selection of TRT's programming.

TRT INT aims to provide a continuance of the ties of Turkish citizens living outside Turkey with Turkey and Turkish culture as well as promoting Turkey and Turkish people's image in every sphere, enhancing the level of education and culture. The Channel is designed to act as a liaison for Turkish citizens living abroad by helping them in various problems they may face abroad; which is why, keeping them in touch with Turkish Republic while, for a better integrity, trying to get them accustomed to the culture they live in forms a significant task for TRT INT.

The Schedule contains education, culture, drama, entertainment, music and sports programs and news with commercial breaks. TRT closed this channel in 2009, and in 2015 TRT World replaced TRT int. The new channel aims to serve much more globalized and polished news programme.

== See also ==
- TRT
- List of television stations in Turkey
