= TRT 4K =

Turkish Ultra HD television channel

- Country: Turkey
- Network: TRT

Programming
- Picture format: 3840x2160 UHD

Ownership
- Owner: TRT
- Sister channels: TRT 1 TRT 2 TRT 3 TRT World; TRT Haber; TRT Spor; TRT Spor Yildiz; TRT Avaz; TRT Çocuk; TRT Belgesel; TRT Müzik; TRT Arabi; TRT Türk; TRT Kurdî; TRT Balkan; TRT 4K; TRT EBA TV; TBMM TV

History
- Launched: 19 February 2015; 11 years ago

TRT 4K is an UHD television channel established by Turkish national public broadcaster TRT in cooperation with Türksat. TRT 4K started test broadcasting on February 19, 2015. TRT 4K is Turkey's first free-to-air UHD television channel.

TRT4K uses HEVC (H.265) codec with 4K Ultra HD resolution 3840×2160 and 50 progressive (full) frame rate with hybrid log-gamma HDR. The channel uses Dolby Digital (E-AC-3) audio.

Some live sporting events have been broadcast on TRT 4K, including UEFA Champions League and UEFA European Championship matches.
