= Aulae =

Aulae or Aulai (Ancient Greek: Αὐλαί) may refer to:

- Aulae (Caria), a town of ancient Caria, now in Turkey
- Aulae (Cilicia), a town of ancient Cilicia, now in Turkey
- Aulae (Lycia), a town of ancient Lycia, now in Turkey
