= TBMM TV =

- Country: Turkey
- Broadcast area: Turkey, Azerbaijan, KKTC, United States
- Headquarters: Kızılay Square, Çankaya Kızılay, Ankara

Programming
- Language(s): Turkish
- Picture format: 1080i HDTV

Ownership
- Owner: TRT; TBMM
- Sister channels: TRT 1 TRT 2 TRT 3 TRT World; TRT Haber; TRT Spor; TRT Spor Yildiz; TRT Avaz; TRT Çocuk; TRT Belgesel; TRT Müzik; TRT Arabi; TRT Türk; TRT Kurdî; TRT 4K; TRT EBA TV; TBMM TV

History
- Launched: 10 December 1994

Links
- Website: tv.tbmm.gov.tr (in Turkish)

Availability

Terrestrial
- Terrestrial broadcasting: National

TBMM TV, or Parliament TV, is a Turkish TV channel which broadcasts discussions held in the Grand National Assembly of Turkey; the channel shares frequencies with TRT 3.

== History ==
TBMM TV first started broadcasts on 10 December 1994. Its operations are stated as follows in Article 21 of the Turkish Radio and Television Law.

The Turkish Radio and Television Corporation broadcasts on the radio the summarized work of the General Assembly of the Turkish Grand National Assembly in a balanced and impartial manner. The activities of the Turkish Grand National Assembly are reflected through TBMM TV from TRT 3, one of the TV channels allocated to the institution. The extent to which the activities of the Turkish Grand National Assembly will be reflected is determined by a protocol to be prepared jointly by the Presidency of the Turkish Grand National Assembly and the General Directorate of the Turkish Radio and Television Corporation. No fee is charged for these publications.

TBMM TV broadcasts live meetings of the Grand National Assembly on Tuesdays, Wednesdays and Thursdays, between 14:00 and 19:00.

== Alleged censorship ==
TRT is not allowed to censor any dialogue on TBMM TV and blackouts during speeches by opposition parliamentarians have generally been attributed to technical failure.

Various sources have stated that the group meeting of the Republican People's Party (CHP) was not broadcast live on 22 November 2016. TBMM TV officials attributed that this was "due to reasons beyond our control."

On 2 October 2019, the channel reportedly cut off after CHP leader Kemal Kılıçdaroğlu began giving a speech at a CHP group meeting. A statement from TBMM TV said that the broadcast was not interrupted and that TBMM TV switched to another broadcast as required by law.
