= TRT Spor =

- Country: Turkey
- Headquarters: Ankara

Programming
- Language: Turkish
- Picture format: 1080i (HDTV)

Ownership
- Owner: Turkish Radio and Television Corporation
- Sister channels: TRT 1 TRT 2 TRT 3 TRT World; TRT Haber; TRT Spor Yıldız; TRT Avaz; TRT Çocuk; TRT Belgesel; TRT Müzik; TRT Arabi; TRT Türk; TRT Kurdî; TRT 4K; TRT EBA TV; TBMM TV

History
- Launched: 9 August 2010 (TRT 3-Spor); 7 March 2012 (TRT Spor); 8 December 2014 (TRT Spor HD)
- Former names: TRT 3 (Split)

Links
- Website: TRT Spor

TRT Spor is a sports television channel established by TRT. In 2010, it was planned to close TRT 3 and replace it with TRT Spor, but because of TBMM TV broadcasts, it was decided not to close TRT 3 and instead establish TRT Spor as a separate channel. Since 9 August 2010, the TRT Spor logo has also appeared alongside the TRT 3 logo during broadcasts. In addition, beginning on 7 March 2012, another channel broadcasting solely with the TRT Spor logo was launched on a separate frequency. When TBMM TV broadcasts begin, the broadcast of the TRT Spor-branded channel on this frequency is not affected. During TBMM TV broadcasts, the TBMM TV logo appears alongside the TRT 3 logo instead of the TRT Spor logo. TRT Spor also began broadcasting in HD on 8 December 2014, and the channel's idents, graphics, and logo were changed. TRT Spor 2, which was intended to broadcast all sports disciplines, began broadcasting on 27 September 2019. On 19 May 2021, it was renamed TRT Spor Yıldız. Since 10 September 2020, it has held the broadcasting rights to the 1. Lig. Until the end of the 2022–23 season, it held the broadcasting rights jointly with beIN Sports. On Friday morning, 7 January 2022, at 07:00, it changed its logo and idents.

== Broadcast competitions ==
- 1. Lig
- Coppa Italia
- 7Days EuroCup
- Sultans League
- Efeler Ligi
- FIFA World Cup
- UEFA European Championship
- Summer Olympics
- Wimbledon Championships
- Paralympic Games
- Winter Olympics
- UEFA Champions League (some matches)
- UEFA Europa League (Turkey and some other matches)
- UEFA Conference League (Turkey and some other matches)

== Former programs ==
- 2011–2018: Süper Spor
- 2016: Olimpiyat Yolu
- 2017: A Takım Yolunda
- 2017: Eurobasket
- 2017: Bekle Bizi Süper Lig
- 2017: Futbolun Zirvesi
- 2017: Set Smaç Maç
- 2017–2018: Basın Tribünü
- 2017–2018: Hava Atışı
- 2017–2018: Spor Dünyası
- 2017–2018: Spor Bahane
- 2018: Yapabilir misin?
- 2018: Pota Altı
- 2017–2019: Tenis Dünyası
- 2018–2019: Genç Spor
- 2018–2019: Sporun Kadınları
- 2018–2019: Takvim Yaprakları

== TRT Spor HD ==
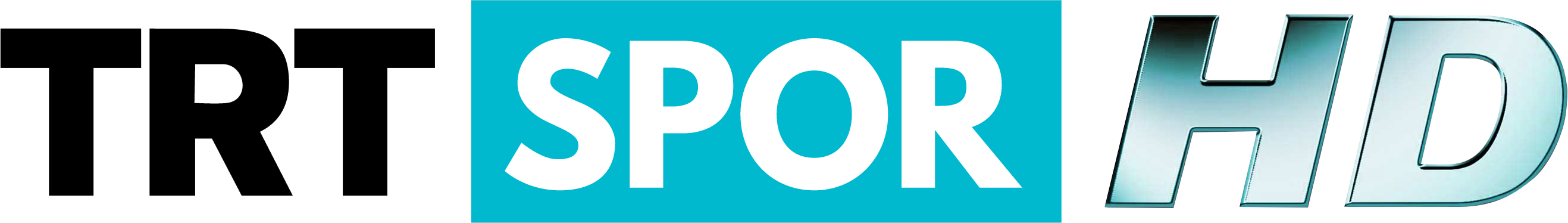
The logo of TRT Spor HD

TRT Spor HD began broadcasting on 8 December 2014. It broadcasts simultaneously with the TRT Spor and TRT 3 channels in HD picture quality.

TRT Spor HD could be watched on Türksat 3A frequency 11054 V 30000 3/4, Eutelsat 7A frequency 10762 V 30000 5/6, D-Smart channel 86, Digiturk channel 86, KabloTV channel 222, tivibu channel 84, and Turkcell TV+ channel 70. The "HD" designation was removed from the logo.

== Logos ==
Logo used from 8 December 2014 to 9 June 2021

Joint broadcast logo of TRT 3 and TRT Spor. 9 June 2021–7 January 2022

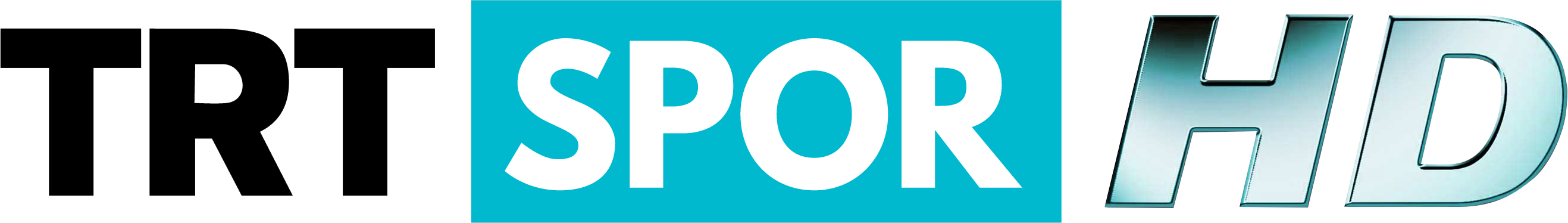
Logo used for TRT Spor's HD broadcasts

9 June 2021–7 January 2022

7 January 2022–present

Joint broadcast logo of TRT 3 and TRT Spor. 7 January 2022–present
