= TRT Belgesel =

Turkish public television channel

- Country: Turkey
- Headquarters: Konak Square, Alsancak, Konak, İzmir

Programming
- Language(s): Turkish
- Picture format: 16:9 (1080i, SDTV)

Ownership
- Owner: Turkish Radio and Television Corporation
- Sister channels: TRT 1 TRT 2 TRT 3 TRT World; TRT Haber; TRT Spor; TRT Spor Yildiz; TRT Avaz; TRT Çocuk; TRT Belgesel; TRT Müzik; TRT Arabi; TRT Türk; TRT Kurdî; TRT 4K; TRT EBA TV; TBMM TV

History
- Launched: 17 October 2009; 15 years ago
- Former names: TRT Turizm

Links
- Website: http://www.trt.net.tr/trtbelgesel/

TRT Belgesel (TRT Documentary) is a Turkish Free-to-air television channel owned and operated by Turkish Radio and Television Corporation. It broadcasts documentaries.
