= 98.6 =

98.6 may refer to:

- 98.6°F, a historical value for the average normal human body temperature
- "98.6" (song), a song by Keith
- 98.6 FM, an FM radio frequency
- 98.6, a novel by Ronald Sukenick
- 98.6 ZHFM, a Classic Hits FM radio station in New Zealand
- DRG Class 98.6, a steam locomotive which has been renamed as Bavarian D VIII
- 98.6 Degrees: The Art of Keeping Your Ass Alive, a survival book by Cody Lundin
- 98.6 Charivari, a German radio station from Nuremberg
