= 89.2 FM =

The following radio stations broadcast at 89.2 MHz.

== China ==
- CNR Music Radio in Zhangjiajie
- CNR The Voice of China in Laibin, Lhasa and Longyan

== Sri Lanka ==
- Lite 89.2

== Turkey ==
- Radyo 3 at Adana

== United Kingdom ==
- BBC Radio 2
