= 98.6 FM =

FM radio frequency

The following radio stations broadcast on FM frequency 98.6 MHz:

== New Zealand ==
- The Hits in Auckland

== Qatar ==
- Malayalam Radio in Doha

== Turkey ==
- Radyo Türkü in Ankara
- Radyo 3 in Antalya, Manavgat
- Radyo 2 in Karaman

== United Kingdom ==
- Hillz 98.6 FM in Coventry
