= Eğitim Bilişim Ağı =

Educational content network in Turkey

Education Information Network
- Native name: Eğitim Bilişim Ağı
- Available in: Turkish and English
- Website: www.eba.gov.tr
- Commercial: No
- Launched: 2012; 14 years ago
- Current status: Active

Eğitim Bilişim Ağı (Education Information Network) or EBA is an educational content network in Turkey, founded by the Ministry of National Education. The site is designed and run by the Innovation and Educational Technologies General Directorate, which is affiliated with the Ministry. The purpose of the network is the integration of technology to education when required, and the network gives online access to course materials to teachers and students under the FATİH project. Parents and teachers can also access EBA.

Educational material is uploaded to eba.gov.tr categorically, the contents of which have expanded throughout the years. Starting from the second term of the 2019-2020 academic year, it has started offering university exam preparation for 11 and 12th grades. In 20 March 2020, when the COVID-19 pandemic started in Turkey, TRT EBA TV was founded as a collaboration between TRT and EBA for primary, secondary and high schools on three different TV channels to provide students education from home.

== See also ==
- TRT EBA TV
