= Soda Industry Inc. =

Chemical company in Mersin, Turkey

- Native name: Soda Sanayii A.Ş.
- Industry: Chemicals
- Founded: 1969; 57 years ago
- Headquarters: Kazanlı, Mersin, Turkey
- Products: Soda ash, chromium compounds , sodium metabisulphite, vitamin K3
- Owner: Şişecam Group
- Location of the company in Turkey
- Website: www.sodakrom.com

Soda Industry Inc. (Turkish: Soda Sanayii A.Ş., also called Sodakrom) is a chemical company in Mersin, Turkey producing soda ash and chromium compounds mainly for the glass industry in its parent's group of companies. It is owned and operated by the Şişecam Group.

The soda plant at 36°48′51″N 34°44′55″E is to the west of Kazanlı neighborhood in Akdeniz district of Mersin, southern Turkey.

== History ==
The Soda Industry Inc. was established in 1969 as a subsidiary of the Şişecam Group, Turkey's major glass producer. Production of soda ash (sodium carbonate, Na_{2}CO_{3}), a key raw material for the glass industry, began in 1975.

In 1979, the Kromsan Chromium Compounds Plant (Turkish: Kromsan Krom Bileşikleri Fabrikası) was founded. It is situated just to the northwest of the Soda Plant. In 1982, it joined the Şişecam Chemicals Group, one of the four main businesses of Şişecam Group. In 1986, Kromsan merged with the Soda Industry company.

Beginning by 1997, Soda Industry began foreign investments. Soda Industry acquired 25% share of the Bulgarian Soda factory Sodi in 1997 and all shares of the Bosnian soda factory Lukavac in 2006 to increase its soda production. In 2011 Soda Industry also acquired the Italian Chromium Products factory Cromital . The Soda Plant and the Kromsan Chromium Compounds Plant produce chemicals, which are used in a variety of industrial and consumer goods such as detergents, leather and pharmaceuticals.

== Production ==
Soda Industry now is the leading producer of chromium compounds and the 4th greatest producer of sodium compounds (such as sodium dichromate (Na_{2}Cr_{2}O_{7}), basic chromium sulfate ([Cr_{2}(H_{2}O)_{6}(OH)_{4}]SO_{4}) and chromic acid (H_{2}CrO_{4} ) with an annual production of 2.2 million metric tons in Europe. Vitamin K3 and sodium metabisulphite are among the other products.
