= Ghida Fakhry =

Lebanese-British journalist

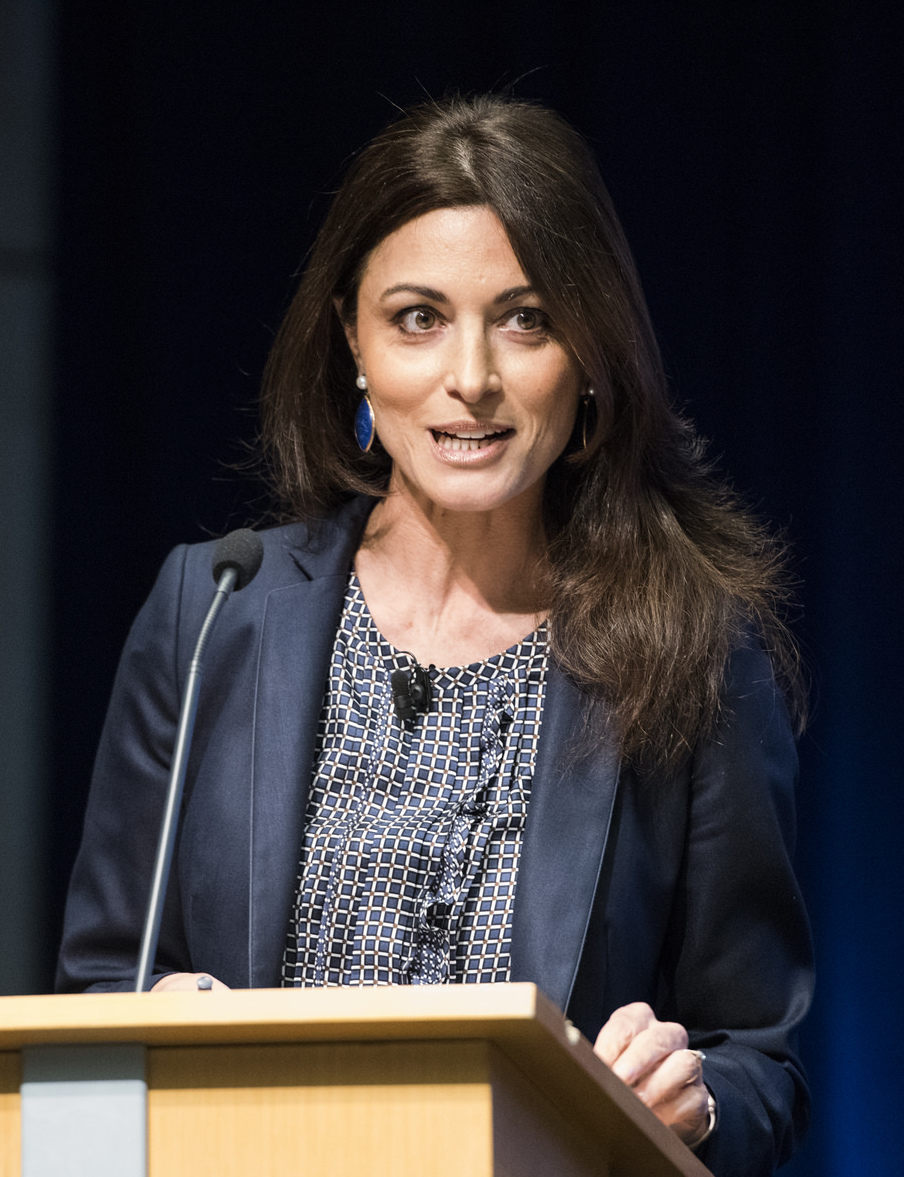
- Ghida Fakhry moderating an event at the 2017 World Bank Group-IMF Spring Meetings
- Born: Beirut, Lebanon
- Education: SOAS University of London
- Occupation: Journalist
- Years active: 1996–present
- Notable credit: Witness
- Website: www.ghidafakhry.com

Ghida Fakhry (Arabic: غیدا فخري) is a Lebanese-British journalist, currently a host and executive producer for TRT World in Washington D.C. She was a lead anchor for the global news channel Al Jazeera English at its launch in Washington D.C., and was later one of the primary anchors at the network's headquarters in Doha. She was also the host of Witness, a documentary program.

== Career ==
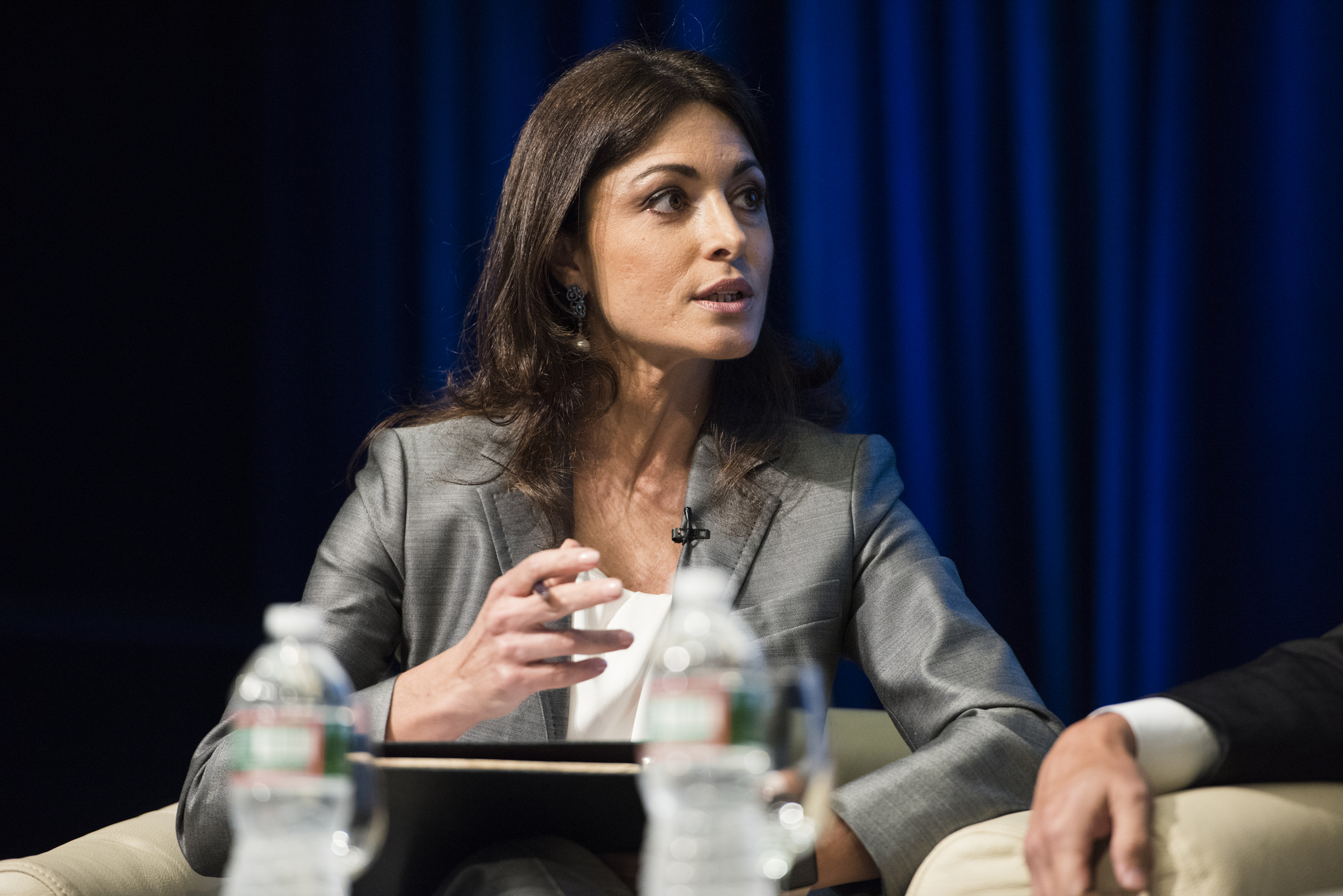
Ghida Fakhry at the 2017 World Bank Group-IMF Spring Meetings

Ghida Fakhry started her TV career as a Middle East analyst for CNN and was a CNN world report contributor. She later became New York Bureau Chief and Columnist for a leading London-based Middle East newspaper and covered the annual General Assembly meetings of the UN.

As New York Correspondent and Bureau Chief for Al Jazeera from 2000, she covered the 9/11 attacks. Fakhry conducted interviews in Washington D.C., with U.S. Secretary of Defense, Donald Rumsfeld, and the Secretary of State, Colin Powell, as well as several other senior State Department and Pentagon officials. She reported on location from Baghdad and Kabul in the summer of 2003 while traveling with Rumsfeld during his first trip to Iraq after the US-led invasion and covered his visit to the Abu Ghraib prison.

Fakhry joined Al Jazeera English at its launch in 2006, taking on the role of Lead Female Anchor in the network's Washington DC broadcast center. She presented the award-winning documentary program Witness in 2010.

In 2017, she joined TRT World and launched a monthly global affairs program Bigger than Five. Since 2020, she also hosts the weekly political program Inside America with Ghida Fakhry.

== Awards and recognition ==
2007: Voted as one of four US-based news anchors in Esquire Magazine's annual 'Women We Love'.

2012: George Foster Peabody Award for Al Jazeera's coverage of the Arab Spring.

2013: Named among the World's Most Influential Arabs by Arabian Business Power 500.
