= Turan Kışlakçı =

Turkish journalist

- Born: 1973 (age 52–53); Bingöl, Turkey
- Occupation: Journalist
- Known for: Anadolu Agency; Director of TRT Arabi

Turan Kışlakçı (born 1973) is a Turkish journalist.

== Education ==
He received his primary and secondary education in schools in the city as he studied for a year in Malatya college of economy before moving to Pakistan where he graduated from fundamentals of religion class at the International Islamic University, Islamabad.

== TRT Al Arabiya ==
Kachlakji was appointed director of the channel in March 2015.

== Awards ==
Kashlakji was awarded many times from many official areas in several topics such as the badge of honor he got from the Syrian Opposition Coalition in 2012 for his support to the Arab Spring.
