= Witness (2006 TV programme) =

- Title card
- Presented by: Former: Ghida Fakhry (2010–2011); Former: Rageh Omaar (2006–10)

Original release
- Network: Al Jazeera English
- Release: November 2006 – present

Witness is the flagship documentary television program that airs on Al Jazeera English. The program showcases documentaries commissioned or acquired from independent filmmakers around the world. The films focus on stories that receive less international coverage and "people at the margins of society."

Witness was one of the first programmes on Al Jazeera English and has been airing since the channel's inception in November 2006. The primary broadcast windows are Sundays for their half-hour programmes and Wednesdays for their hour-long programmes, with repeats appearing throughout the week. It is also available online.

The show has won multiple documentary awards, including the Peabody and the International Emmy, and been nominated for many others, including an Academy Award, One World, Rory Peck Trust, and Gierson. The programme team has also served as the creative staff behind other Al Jazeera English series, including Viewfinder Latin America (2012-2015) and Viewfinder Asia (2012-2014), Artscape (2009–2014), Wildlife Warzone (2013), and Rebel Architecture (2014).

== History ==
Witness premiered in November 2006 when Al Jazeera English launched globally. It was initially presented by Rageh Omaar, Fakhry took over briefly as presenter in 2010 for one year.

It is one of the few programmes that makes documentaries available worldwide on all media platforms. The topics covered by the series includes stories of inspiration, empowerment, creativity and a deeper plunge into communities that are otherwise excluded from the global conversation. This includes stories on conflict, the environment, women's rights, the arts, economic equity and social justice. The core of each story is a reflection of how global events affect local communities and the people who live there.

== Inside the Red Mosque (2007) ==
Witness' coverage of the Red Mosque in Islamabad shortly before a government siege garnered an International Emmy Award nomination in 2008.

The film, contained the final interview with Abdul Rashid Ghazi before his assassination.

== Awards ==
In 2016 Witness was part of the team nominated at the Academy Awards for Best Documentary Short for the film, Chau, Beyond The Lines. In 2015, "Witness" won an International Emmy for the film, Miners Shot Down. This story is about miners in South Africa who rise up to seek a better living and working conditions. In 2013 Witness was awarded the Peabody Award for the film, Sheikh Jarrah, My Neighbourhood. This documentary tells the story of Palestinians in East Jerusalem who face eviction and find unexpected allies to the cause.

A special on two schools in the West Bank under Israeli occupation, Return to Nablus, received an International Emmy nomination in 2009.

16 other documentaries featured on Witness have won awards at various international film festivals.
