= ITU TV =

İTÜ TV
- Type: Broadcast television network (1952–1971)
- Country: Turkey
- Availability: Istanbul
- Founded: 1952
- TV stations: Taşkışla
- Headquarters: Maçka, Istanbul
- Owner: Istanbul Technical University
- Key people: Mustafa Santur
- Launch date: July 9, 1952; 73 years ago
- Dissolved: February 4, 1972; 54 years ago (19 years, 210 days)
- Affiliates: Radio ITU
- Official website: itu.edu.tr
- Replaced by: TRT 1

İTÜ TV was the first Turkish television station. Its broadcasts began on 9 July 1952, from a station at Istanbul Technical University (İTÜ)'s electrical engineering department. Weekly two-hour broadcasts from İTÜ continued on an experimental basis, but by 1957 there were still fewer than 200 television receivers in Istanbul. The station carried out its broadcasts on VHF channel 4. İTÜ broadcasts continued until 1970, and in 1971 its facilities and equipment were ordered to be transferred to the Turkish Radio and Television Corporation, and İTÜ TV was subsequently shut down.

== History ==
Mustafa Santur was the head of Istanbul Technical University. He came across television for the first time in 1938. Switzerland, the Netherlands, and Germany were making broadcast trials a few days a week. He went to Europe to research television in 1948. After arriving in Europe, he started working. The television initiative of the university of ITU had been positive. The economic budget was limited. Turkey imports were banned in the early 1950s. That's why they could not get the materials. Philips gave a camera to an İTÜ TV channel transmitter and gifts. Adnan Ataman completed his education in the United States and returned to Turkey. Ataman was tasked with the launch of the television broadcast. He had seen television for the first time in the United States, then traveled to the Netherlands with his wife and encountered television devices there. He brought these devices back to Turkey. A laboratory was set up with three small rooms, with the largest one to be used as a studio. An antenna problem arose after everything was completed. Since there were no television antennas in Turkey at the time, it was not known that they wouldn't work. A 10-meter-high mast was erected despite the cold weather, and it was successfully installed. The broadcast began with a 100-watt transmitter provided by Philips and a super storage camera. Trial broadcasting commenced on 9 July 1952.

The studio is connected to the control and command room. It was equipped with a signal generator, a 35 mm movie projector, an image monitor, a motion picture camera, a record player, and a sound monitor. In another room down the corridor, there were two small 100-watt transmitters. Turks began watching television in 1953, and İTÜ TV's weekly broadcast schedule gained great appreciation and support. Over the years, there were improvements in broadcast quality. During this period, Ataman became the first cameraman, and Fatih Pasiner became the first newsreader and television presenter. The building's antenna was erected on 17 October 1959, to enhance the technical quality. However, in 1960, ITU TV faced a period of stagnation due to the interruption caused by the 1960 Turkish coup d'état. On 2 May 1960, the İTÜ Radio and Television were sealed by the police, but broadcasting resumed on 6 October. Live broadcasts started in 1961, and on 5 December 1963, the channel moved to new premises. The power of the transmitter was increased to 500 watts in 1963. The first live broadcast of İTÜ TV's opening ceremony took place on 21 October 1965. The first live broadcast of a match occurred on 1 May 1966. Preparations for national television broadcasts began in 1966, and the first closed-circuit broadcast was shown on 16 January 1967. The first national television broadcast in mono format took place on 31 January 1968, when TRT 1 began its broadcasting. In the late 1960s, television was boycotted by students. The last broadcast of İTÜ TV took place on 6 March 1970, and it was interrupted on March 13. TRT broadcasts began in 1971 in Istanbul using İTÜ TV materials. İTÜ TV aired its last match in 1971 and made its final television broadcast on 4 February 1972. On the night of the same date, the signals of İTÜ TV was turned off for the last time and in the morning of 5 February 1972, İTÜ TV was dissolved.

== Firsts in the Turkish history of television ==
The first television artist was Feriha Tunceli, followed by Nebahat Yedibaş, Cevdet Çağla, and Hüsnü Coşar. Over time, the quality and content of the broadcasts improved, attracting a larger audience. A significant date in reaching a wider audience was 18 March 1954. Arif Yaseri posted the first theater play on television, titled "Letter," which lasted for 30 minutes.

Weather programs started broadcasting on television in 1954 and became one of the most interesting programs. The channel continued airing until its closure. Sydney Tweles from America was called to provide a program, but she didn't know Turkish. She returned one week later, and Ali took over the program, called "Inspire." On 13 January 1955, the first fashion show was organized on television. Interest in television increased in 1956. The first sports program began airing in 1957, with Pertev Tunaseli being the first sports commentator on television.

In 1957, films were shown on television for the first time. The film "Hitit Güneşi" was released, followed by the film "Berduş," in which Zeki Müren starred. There was a power cut during the movie's release. Broadcasting was suspended on 28 April 1960, due to political protests. The first television quiz program, "Luck Bird," was initiated in 1960 by Halit Kıvanç. Another competition program that started in 1960 was "Mini Goal." In 1961, interviews with singers and movie stars began.

The first broadcast of a football match took place in 1961 at Inonu Stadium. The Fenerbahçe–Galatasaray match was broadcast on New Year's Day 1962. On 27 March 1963, a live broadcast of a Turkey–Italy match took place.

In 1962, Erkan Yolaç started the classic quiz show "Yes-No." English lessons began broadcasting in 1963 with the program "Let's Speak English," which was highly appreciated. German courses also started.

Turkey's first talk show program was launched in 1965, hosted by Fecri Ebcioğlu. The program featured Öztürk Serengil, Gönül Yazar, Barış Manço, Ajda Pekkan, Zeki Müren, and other notable names. On 9 May 1966, the Golden Microphone Awards began to be broadcast.

== Program ==
- 1952-1971: ITU News
- 1953-1968: Music Show
- 1954-1971: Weather
- 1960-1970: Windfall
- 1960-1962: Mini Goal
- 1962-1965: Magazine
- 1963-1964: Let's Speak English
- 1965-1970: Fecri Ebcioğlu Show

== Bibliography ==
- Kıvanç, Halit (2002). İTÜ-TV : televizyon tarihimize ışık tutacak bir araştırma. İTÜ. p. 67.
