= Adesewa Josh =

Nigerian broadcast journalist

- Born: Adesewa Hannah Ogunleyimu; October 11, 1985 (age 40); Ipetu-Ijesha, Osun State, Nigeria
- Education: Lagos State University; Columbia University Graduate School of Journalism
- Occupation: Broadcast journalist
- Years active: 2012–present
- Awards: 2017: The Future Awards Africa,

Adesewa Hannah Ogunleyimu (born October 11, 1985), known professionally as Adesewa Josh, is a Nigerian broadcast journalist who covers both national and international news for TRT World. Previously she was a correspondent at Channels TV from 2012 to 2017.

== Early life and education ==
Josh was born in the town of Ipetu-Ijesha in Osun State in southwestern Nigeria to father Josiah Ogunleyimu, who was from Osun State Nigeria, and mother Abimbola Ogunleyimu, who was from Epe, Lagos.

In 2009, Josh received a Certificate in News Production and Reporting from BBC World Service. In 2010, she earned a Certificate in Governance from Alder Consulting and in 2012, a certificate in TV Presenting from the UK's Aspire Presenting Institute. She also holds a Certificate in Basic Presentation from Radio Nigeria.

Josh earned an undergraduate degree in biochemistry from the University of Ado Ekiti, and holds a professional certification from the Nigerian Institute of Science Laboratory Technology. In 2011, Josh earned a postgraduate diploma in International relations from Lagos State University. In 2017, Josh received a master's degree from Columbia University Graduate School of Journalism.

== Career ==
In the early 1990s, Josh worked as a child actor in Nigeria, where she appeared in ABC Wonderland from Galaxy Television (Nigeria). She also worked on the soap, Tinsel. Josh also appeared in theater productions at the University of Ibadan Theater Art Hall where she appeared in Wedlock of the Gods, The Gods are Not to Blame, and Under the Moon.

In 2007, Josh was a cast member of the Nigerian reality television show called Next Movie Star, which focused on discovering new talents in the acting profession.

In 2012, Josh co-hosted a TV talent hunt show Lucozade Boost Freestyle with Nigerian comedian Julius Agwu. She also appeared as a judge on Nigerian Idol.

In July 2012, Josh began her career as a journalist as a co-host of the early morning show Sunrise Daily on Nigerian cable news network Channels TV in Lagos, Nigeria. She became the Channels TV evening news anchor and worked as a producer reporting on international affairs, a position she held until October 2017.

After briefly working at Voice of America in New York City in 2017, Josh worked as a host of the Emmy-nominated United Nations documentary news series called 21st Century Programme.

In November 2017, Josh began working as a news correspondent with TRT World based out of Istanbul, Turkey. In this position, Josh covers international affairs for TRT World News and other news platforms on Africa's development, politics, and diplomatic relations. Josh produces the news segment The Newsmakers and serves as a correspondent at the Africa Desk of TRT World. She also hosts a program called Network Africa for TRT World.

Josh has done extensive work on the social impact of the Boko Haram insurgency on women and children.

== Philanthropy ==
After years of reporting in many African communities, in 2013 Josh launched Project Smile Africa, a non-governmental organization through which she works as a community development strategist, identifying key development issues in poor rural communities and proffers sustainable solutions by enlisting residents who she trains as community influencers. The NGO offers mentorship, encourages education, and cultivates social welfare.

In 2014, Josh initiated Project Talk2urteens, a project to raise awareness on the prevalence of teenage pregnancy in Nigeria.

== Awards ==
- 2016: CHAMP Xceptional Women Network, Xceptional Women in Media Award
- 2017: The Future Awards Africa, The Future Awards Prize for On-Air Personality (Visual), Nominee

== Memberships ==
- 2016: Junior Achievement Nigeria
- 2016: Nigerian Leadership Initiative, Associate Fellow
- Young African Leaders Initiative, YALI Network Member
- Global Investigative Journalism Network (GIJ)
