= Aulae (Caria) =

Town of ancient Caria

Coordinates: 36°45′39″N 28°08′04″E

Aulae or Aulai (Ancient Greek: Αὐλαί) was a town on the coast of ancient Caria, on the Bozburun Peninsula.

Its site is located near Orhaniye, Muğla Province, Turkey.
