= FATİH project =

Movement to Increase Opportunities and Technology or FATİH Project (Turkish: Fırsatları Artırma ve Teknolojiyi İyileştirme Hareketi) is a project of the Turkish government which seeks to integrate state-of-the-art computer technology into Turkey's public education system. On November 22, 2010, then-Prime Minister Recep Tayyip Erdoğan initiated the project.

== Name ==
The acronym "fatih" is a word play about the conqueror of Istanbul, Fatih Sultan Mehmet. Like the famous sultan, the FATİH project also aims to open a new era.

== The project ==
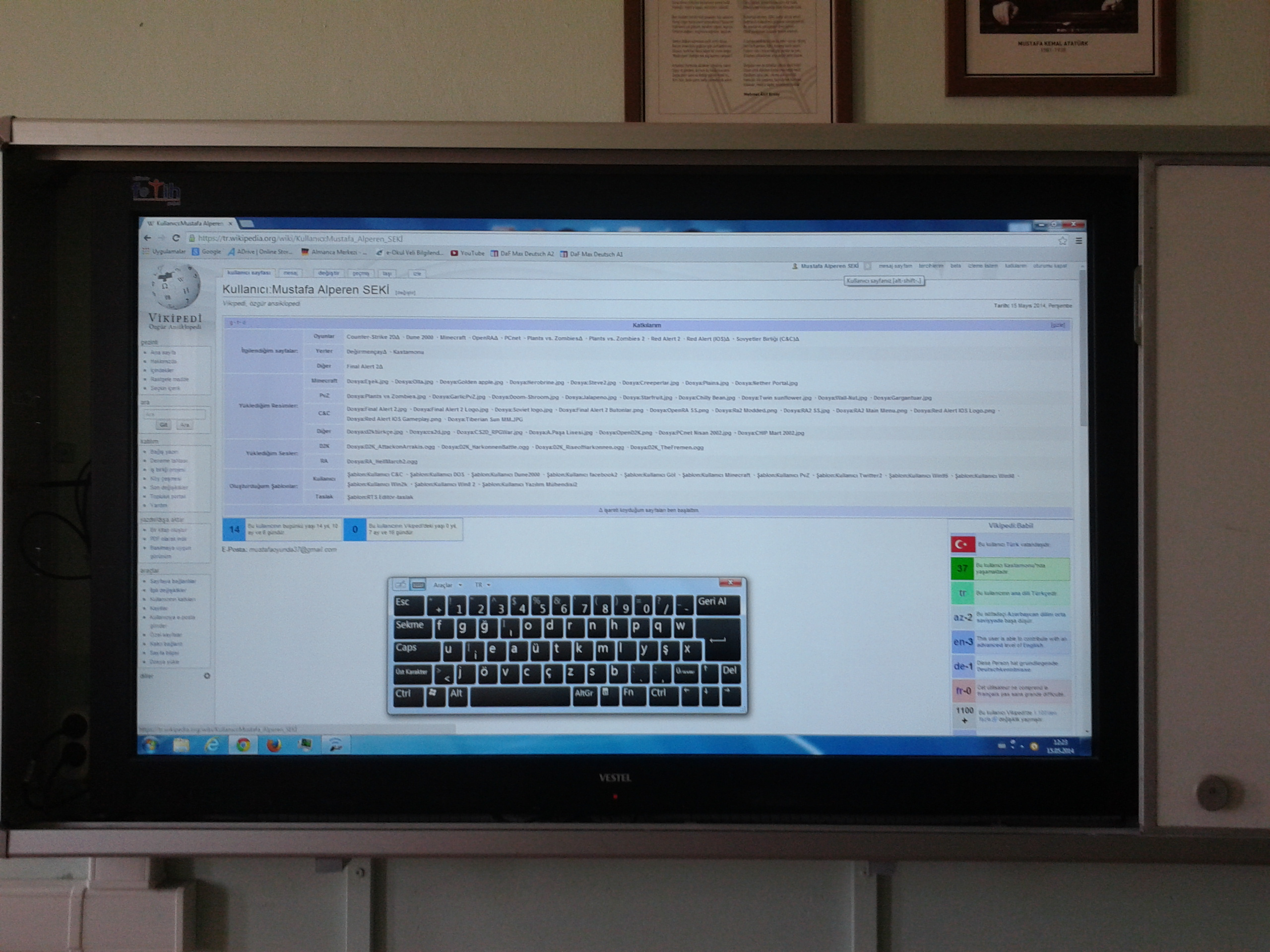
Smartboard

With the initiation of the FATİH project, classes will receive smart boards, students will receive tablet computers and classes will be enriched with the use of e-books. The project has been completely designed by Turkish engineers. All state schools spanning from preschools all the way to high school level will receive a total of 620,000 smart boards, while tablet computers will be distributed to 17 million students and approximately one million teachers and administrators. This project, which is being conducted by the Ministry of National Education and supported by the Ministry of Transportation is expected to be completed in 2015.

== Content ==
The tablet computers which will be distributed to students, are loaded with e-books. In addition to books, tablets include class lessons, sounds, animations and graphics. Both teachers and students are restricted from entering all websites. Only websites that have been selected by educators and specialists and passed through the Ministry of National Education's filtering system and deemed harmless are granted access. Teachers are able to check on their own tablets whether or not a student is following the course. If a student is found straying from the lesson, teachers have the capability to lock a student's computer. Although "success (or failure) may depend .... on ... groups outside the formal education sector" login to the main content site was only available to state schools.

== Financing ==
The pilot stage for the tablets was conducted with Samsung and General Mobile via the State Materials Office. For every 4,800 tablets purchased from Samsung, each one cost 775 TL. For every 4,000 tablets purchased by General Mobile, each cost 599 TL. For every smart board purchased from Vestel, 3,990 TL will be paid out. In order to protect the software against sales, the tablet computers will shut down automatically if they go two weeks without accessing a smart board.

== Analysis ==
Education Reform Initiative and RTI International have collaborated on a policy note on the project. In summary: One recommendation is that "The MoNE and FAİIH would benefit from a communication plan that more effectively disseminates information about the project, and seeks feedback in a meaningful way (and one which is open to the possibility of change based on feedback)."
