= TRT Çocuk =

Turkish television station

- Country: Turkey
- Broadcast area: Turkey, Azerbaijan, KKTC
- Headquarters: Kızılay Square, Çankaya, Kızılay, Ankara

Programming
- Language: Turkish
- Picture format: 16:9 (576i, SDTV); 16:9 (1080i, HDTV)
- Timeshift service: TRT Kids Channel

Ownership
- Owner: TRT
- Sister channels: TRT 1 TRT 2 TRT 3 TRT World; TRT Haber; TRT Spor; TRT Spor Yildiz; TRT Avaz; TRT Çocuk; TRT Belgesel; TRT Müzik; TRT Arabi; TRT Türk; TRT Kurdî; TRT 4K; TRT EBA TV; TBMM TV

History
- Launched: 30 July 1990 (as TRT4); 22 April 2008 (as TRT Çocuk)
- Replaced: TRT 4
- Former names: TRT 4 (From 1 September 2008, now a program on this channel)

Links
- Website: https://www.trtcocuk.net.tr/

TRT Çocuk is a Turkish free-to-air television channel part of the Turkish Radio and Television Corporation, which can also be received in Azerbaijan. It broadcasts a wide range of programming for children such as cartoons, drama and entertainment 24 hours a day. From 2011 to 2017, the channel broadcast until 21:00 TRT (Turkish Time), and broadcast TRT Okul until 06:30 TRT (Turkish Time) afterwards.

== Gallery ==
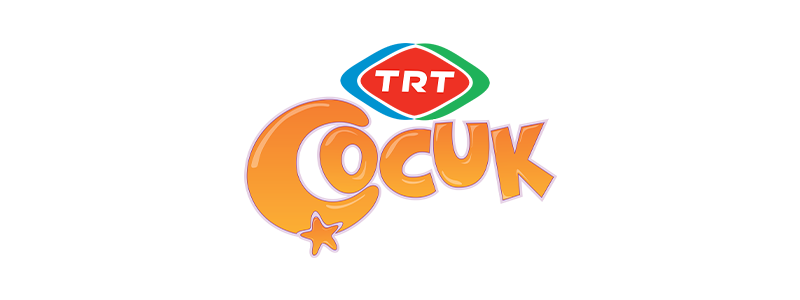
Old logo used from 2008 to 2021
