= Aulae (Lycia) =

Coordinates: 36°45′39″N 28°08′04″E

Aulae or Aulai (Ancient Greek: Αὐλαί) was a town of ancient Lycia, noted by Stephanus of Byzantium.

Its site is unlocated. Certain Lycian League coins dated to the 1st century BCE have been attributed to Aulae in Lycia. The obverse of these coins show the head of Apollo laureate with long curls, bow at shoulder, marked Α-Υ. The reverse, also marked Α-Υ, shows a lyre with a bow and arrow, the whole in incuse square.
