= TRT Müzik =

- Country: Turkey

Programming
- Language: Turkish
- Picture format: 4:3, 16:9 (576i, SDTV); 16:9 (1080i, HDTV)

Ownership
- Owner: TRT
- Sister channels: TRT 1 TRT 2 TRT 3 TRT World; TRT Haber; TRT Spor; TRT Spor Yildiz; TRT Avaz; TRT Çocuk; TRT Belgesel; TRT Arabi; TRT Türk; TRT Kurdî; TRT 4K; TRT EBA TV; TBMM TV

History
- Launched: 16 November 2009; 16 years ago
- Former names: TRT 4

Availability

Terrestrial
- Normal Antenna: Turkey

TRT Müzik is a Turkish television channel owned and operated by TRT. It broadcasts music programmes featuring music news magazines and talk shows. TRT Müzik can also be watched on TRT 4.
