= Kazanlı =

Town in Turkey

Coordinates: 36°49′N 35°45′E

Kazanlı is a former municipality in Mersin Province, Turkey. In 2008 the municipality was abolished and absorbed into the municipality Akdeniz within the new district Akdeniz, which was created from part of the former central district of Mersin.

== Geography ==
Kazanlı is approximately 10 kilometres (6.2 mi) east of Mersin center. It is a Mediterranean coastal town. East of the town, there are small settlements surrounded by fields. Towards west and north of the town there are industrial plants and some neighborhoods of Mersin.

== Population ==
The population of the municipality was 10,120 as of 2007. The number of buildings of the town is approximately 1,600.

== Economy ==
The town was the former port of Tarsus. (see Aulae (Cilicia)) But now fishing has replaced export business. Another economic activity is agriculture. The fertile fields around Kazanlı are well known for forced crop, especially vegetables. Beginning in the early 1970s, factories appeared in the north and west of the town. These include a ferrochrome plant, a soda factory, and a number of agri-food factories. A middle wave radio transmitter site is also in Kazanlı.(see Radyo Çukurova)

At the present, tourism plays no role in the Kazanlı economy.

== Sea turtles ==
The beaches around Kazanlı are considered as the most important spawning area of rare species of sea turtles in Turkey. These species are loggerhead sea turtle (Caretta caretta) and especially green sea turtle (Chelonia mydasretta). Both species are listed as endangered species (EN) by the IUCN.

Main concern about the spawning areas is industrial pollution. The heavy metal content of the seawater is continuously monitored by the academicians and the factories are warned by the authorities when necessary.
