= Yaban TV =

- Country: Turkey
- Headquarters: MKM, Uğur Mumcu Cad. No:8 Etiler/İstanbul

Programming
- Language: Turkish

Ownership
- Owner: Melih Meriç

History
- Launched: 2006

Links
- Website: www.yabantv.com

Yaban TV was founded in 2006 with the partnership of the Journalists Mr.Ufuk Güldemir a wildlife sportsman and Mr.Melih Meriç, is the first and only channel for wildlife and outdoorsports.

Fishing, ethical hunting, shooting, archery, diving, off-road, sailing, mountaineering, rafting, horseback riding, para-gliding and alike all outdoor sports' programs and aside of them all agriculture, animal husbandry, gardening and pet programs are also broadcast.

It is the most viewed documentary channel of Turkey. It was awarded by many institutions and organization foremost by the Turkish Journalists Association.

Yaban has designated itself as broadcasting field "the adventures of the people who run after their passions in the wild".

In 2009, with the establishment of Yabanstore, Yabanmama, Yabantur, Yaban Publishing and Yaban Academy it became the most energetic and potent outdoor group in Turkey and its environment.

With an agreement in 2014, all merchandise royalty rights are conveyed to Azel Outdoor Inc.

== Yaban Network ==
Though Yaban considered broadcasting as its main item, it holds a very large outdoor network.

In and around Turkey it is in a collaboration with over 1500 confederations, federations, clubs and associations. It collaborates and joint ventures in the organization of competitions, activities and social awareness projects.

Over 150 social society activities reach its members through the Yaban TV screen. It can move together with its over 150.000 members.

== Conservation ==
Yaban, with the declaration of its Document on Hundred Percent Vision for Nature, supports Social Responsibility projects.

Primarily being the Ministry of Forestry and Water Works, it signes collaboration agreements and works on "nature conservation and sustainability" with hundreds of NGOs, confederations, federations, off-road clubs, sailing clubs, environmental associations, universities.

It is the non-profit partner of projects as "1st Recreational Angling Workshop of Turkey" which is also sponsored by the EU, also "The Programm on Fighting with the Invader Species", "Fighting with Fishing Methods that Leave Permanent Damages in Wildlife in Fresh Waters".

In the year of 2013, the "Chukar Partridge-Alectoris chukar" feeding campaign it organized together with the Ministry of Forestry and Water Works, apart from the 200,000 individuals, all foremost nature and environmental associations have joined in and sponsored it.

Yaban supports the first Natural History Museum of Turkey. It is named after its founder Mr. Ufuk Guldemir in joint venture with the Istanbul Technical University, as ITU Ufuk Natural History Museum, and is constructed within the campus of ITU at Maslak-Istanbul.

Yaban is also the major sponsor of KIF-Turkish Cynological Federation (being the only representative of FCI) that works on the protection of pure dog breeds and introduction of Turkish breeds to the world.

== Hundred % Nature ==
Yaban TV has announced its principles on broadcasting and cooperation with the social society through its declaration on "Hundred percent Nature Vision Document". This document is described as the Yaban Group's status.

=== Hundred % Nature Document ===
Yaban accepts human kind and the nature the fauna and flora as a whole.

It believes that within the human wellness and the unity of nature and the protection of biodiversity of the species, a sustainable balance must be cared for.

Within this frame, it supports all sorts of outdoor activities and sports that unite the man kind with nature and wildlife.

Yaban also induces all outdoor sportsman to carry the responsibility to protect nature.

It collaborates with all parties who share the Hundred % Nature Vision without the discrimination of any race, lingo, religion or political belief.

Principles:

- To practice all outdoor sports in ethical principals and dependent to universal criteria.
- To encourage outdoor sportsmen to work for the good of nature.
- To respect all genres of life in its own ecosystem.
- To pioneer the protection of endangered species and work for the prevention of dying away of the biological diversity.
- Being aware of the social and economic importance of the sustainable use of natural resources, work for their protection.
- To develop the wildlife management under these principals.
- To support the scientific researches and the knowledge of the public, advise the official offices and the national and international organizations.
- Give priority to collaborations within the above scope, establish NGOs and take active role in these organizations.
- To be constructive

== Yaban Academy ==
Yaban Academy gives educational courses on all hobbies mainly on Archery, Shooting, Off-Roading, Wildlife Photography, Ethical Hunting, Amateur Fishing, Underwater Diving and Horseback Riding

== Yabanstore ==
Yabanstore aside from its own brand products, imports and distributes many internationally renown branded products. Yabanstore besides its shops in Turkey, Azerbaijan, Bulgaria and North Cyprus, it serves with 300 sales points within Turkey

== Yabanmama ==
Yaban Dog Food is a product that is produced with a special formula owned by Yaban, made considering the most common breeds, their life conditions and nutrition needs. It targets especially the conscious pet owners who take special care for the breed standards

== Yabantur ==
Yabantur is established to organize wildlife and nature tours to enable people to live different wildlife experiments in life

== Azel Inc. ==
Azel Inc. being established to provide for every body every thing needed to live in the wild, with the exception of Yaban publishing is owning the merchandise rights and operating the Yaban Academy, Yabanstore, Yabanmama and Yabantur brands
