= TRT 3 =

Turkish television network

- Country: Turkey
- Broadcast area: Turkey, reaching bordering regions via overspill of the Turkish terrestrial network
- Affiliates: Radyo 3

Programming
- Language: Turkish
- Picture format: 16:9 (576i, SDTV); 16:9 (1080i, HDTV)

Ownership
- Owner: TRT
- Sister channels: TRT 1 TRT 2 TRT 3 TRT World; TRT Haber; TRT Spor; TRT Spor Yıldız; TRT Avaz; TRT Çocuk; TRT Belgesel; TRT Müzik; TRT Arabi; TRT Türk; TRT Kurdî; TRT 4K; TRT EBA TV; TBMM TV

History
- Launched: 2 October 1989; 37 years ago
- Former names: 3. Kanal (1989–1991); TV3 (1992–1997)

TRT 3 (Turkish: TRT Üç) is a Turkish free-to-air television channel. It mostly broadcasts sport events.

== History ==
TRT 3 started test transmissions on October 2, 1989, as "3. Kanal" or TV3. TV2's reserve transmitters, which were under the jurisdiction of Türk Telekom, were handed over to the new network. TRT 3's transmissions are realized through a time-share with TRT GAP and Turkish Grand National Assembly TV (TBMM TV). The latter started test broadcasts on TRT 3's network on January 10, 1995 and became regular on December 11, 1996.

TRT 3's programs mainly consist of sports, education, culture, music and news. Like most TRT channels, advertisements are allowed on this channel. TRT 3 broadcasts programs in different Turkish dialects.

Between 1991 and 2008 for Turksat Kablo TV viewers, Spanish channel TVE Internacional was broadcast after TRT 3's closure. On February 1, 2001, TRT 3 became a sports channel while the TGNA/GAP broadcasts were retained.

== On screen identity ==
Like other TRT channels, even TRT 3 broadcasts 24 hours a day. Its broadcast starts with a short startup at 06:58. On this start-up, first the TRT Ident is shown, followed by the programme list for the day and the Independence March. TRT 3 aired many world-known series for the first time in Turkey. Among them were Matlock, M*A*S*H, Perry Mason, Hercule Poirot, Night Court, Remington Steele, Automan, Manimal, Loving, The Golden Girls, Out of This World, Houston Knights, Manuela and Thirtysomething. Furthermore, it re-aired some television series like The Waltons, Little House on the Prairie, Bewitched, Bonanza and Columbo.

1989 to 1993

1998 to 2001

2001 to 2005

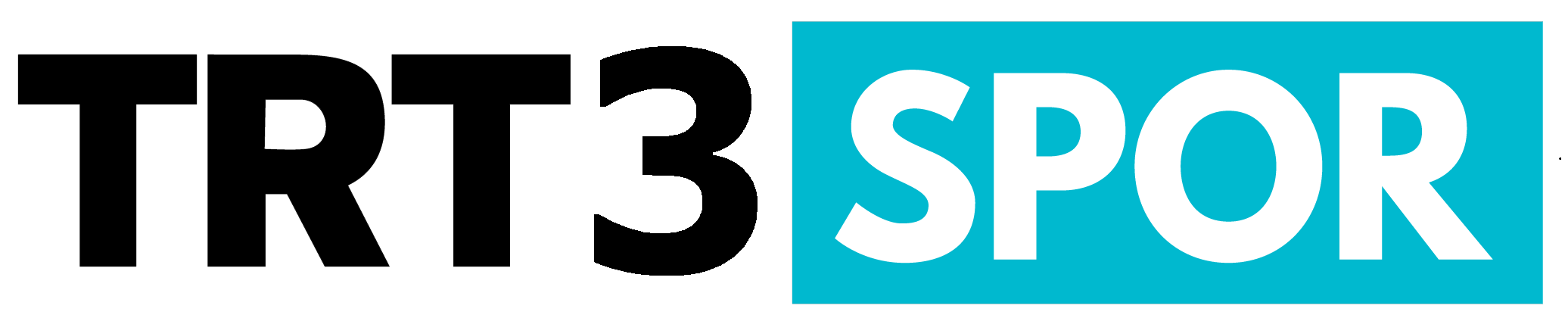
TRT 3 Spor logo 2014 to 2021

2014 to 2021

TRT 3 Spor logo 2021 to 2022

Current logo

Current TRT 3 Spor logo

== HD broadcast ==
TRT 3 HD was the first high definition channel of TRT. It launched on 8 August 2008 to air 2008 Summer Olympics and closed on 24 August 2008.

== See also ==
- List of television stations in Turkey
