= TRT Arabi =

State owned television channel in Turkey

TRT Arabia
- Country: Turkey
- Broadcast area: Worldwide

Programming
- Language: Arabic
- Picture format: 16:9 (576i, SDTV); 16:9 (1080i, HDTV)

Ownership
- Owner: TRT
- Sister channels: TRT 1 TRT 2 TRT 3 TRT World; TRT Haber; TRT Spor; TRT Spor Yildiz; TRT Avaz; TRT Çocuk; TRT Belgesel; TRT Müzik; TRT Arabi; TRT Türk; TRT Kurdî; TRT 4K; TRT EBA TV; TBMM TV

History
- Launched: 4 April 2010; 16 years ago
- Former names: TRT Et-Turkiyye, TRT Al-Arabiya

Availability

Terrestrial
- DVB-T: UHF-32

TRT Arabi, (formerly TRT Arabia; Arabic: TRT عربي / العربية TRT) is an Arabic television channel of TRT, broadcasting to Arabic-speaking audiences in Turkey and the Middle East, 24 hours a day, on subjects, events, and news as well as soap operas from and pertaining to Turkey. It was launched on 4 April 2010.

Turan Kışlakçı was appointed director of the channel in March 2015.

== Logo ==
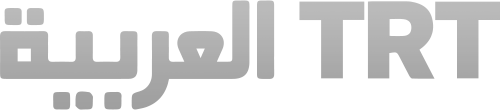
2015 - 2016

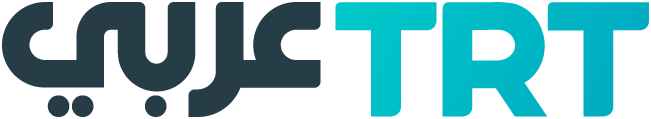
Old Logos

== See also ==
- List of Arabic-language television channels
- Television in Turkey
- TRT
