= Aulae (Cilicia) =

Ancient Roman settlement in Turkey

Coordinates: 36°48′40″N 34°42′07″E

Aulae or Aulai (Ancient Greek: Αὐλαί) was a town in ancient Cilicia, and now is an archaeological site close to Mersin, Turkey.

== Geography ==
The site seems to be situated in Kazanlı, a neighborhood of Mersin.

== History ==
Stephanus of Byzantium had mentioned Aulae as a port of Cilicia between Tarsus and Anchiale, which was a settlement close to Zephyrion (present Mersin centrum). Although Hansgerd Hellenkemper initially proposed a place slightly west of Kazanlı for Aulae, recent findings fixed Kazanlı as the location of Aulae.

== Findings ==
Up to 2012, the only place of historical importance in Kazanlı was that of Topraktepe tumulus to the north of the settlement. In 2012, a group of amphoras were found in Kazanlı close to Mediterranean coast. Most of the amphoras were LR1 (Late Roman) amphoras. There were also LR4 amphoras as well. The amount of amphoras suggest a ceramics production workshop and a busy port. Thus according to Murat Durukan of Mersin University, Kazanlı can be identified with Aulae.
