= TRT 1 =

Turkish public television network

- Logo used since 2021
- Country: Turkey
- Broadcast area: Turkey, reaching bordering regions via overspill of the Turkish terrestrial network
- Affiliates: Radyo 1

Programming
- Language: Turkish
- Picture format: 1080i HDTV (downscaled to 16:9 576i for the SDTV feed)

Ownership
- Owner: Turkish Radio and Television Corporation
- Sister channels: TRT 2 TRT 3 TRT World; TRT Haber; TRT Spor; TRT Spor Yildiz; TRT Avaz; TRT Çocuk; TRT Belgesel; TRT Müzik; TRT Arabi; TRT Türk; TRT Kurdî; TRT 4K; TRT EBA TV; TRT Genç; TBMM TV

History
- Launched: 31 January 1968; 58 years ago
- Former names: Ankara Television (1968–1986); Izmir Television (1970–1986); Istanbul Television (1971–1986); TV1 (1986–1992)

Links
- Website: trt1.com.tr

Availability

Terrestrial
- Analogue or Digital: Various location

Streaming media
- TRT 1 Live: Live TRT 1

TRT 1 (Turkish: TRT Bir) is the first Turkish free-to-air national television channel, owned by state broadcaster TRT. It was officially launched on 31 January 1968 as a test broadcast, becoming regular by the early 1970s. It was the only channel Turkey until 15 September 1986, when TRT launched TRT 2 under the name TV2. It is also available in Azerbaijan on terrestrial television.

On 19 May 2012, it started broadcasting on 16:9 aspect ratio and launched its own HD simulcast feed.

TRT 1 is TRT's general TV channel, available free-to-air through Turksat satellite, on subscription operators Digitürk, D-Smart, Türksat Cable TV, Tivibu or in neighbor countries via foreign cable platforms.

== History ==
Before the start of TRT's television service, viewers used their antennas to receive television signals from neighboring countries. In the 1960s, viewers favored pointing their antennas to Bulgarian National Television's transmitter network. This practice continued well after TRT launched. In the early days of Turkish television, most people could not afford television sets, and most of the sets that did arrive were German imports. When TRT was preparing the creation of a national television network, it relied on aid from West Germany.

TRT started television broadcasts on 31 January 1968 (a Wednesday), as an initially experimental service on VHF channel 5 in Ankara, the national capital. The signal was activated at 7:15pm, displaying a test card with the TRT logo, followed ten minutes later by a static slide with the name Ankara Televizyonu and a statue of Atatürk. At 7:30pm, the first face seen on TRT's service, Nuran Ermen, welcomed viewers, followed by a speech from manager Mahmut Tali Ongoren. At 7:35pm, a documentary (Revolution History of Turkey) followed. The first news bulletin was read at 8pm by Zafer Cilasun. The first weather report was read by Zeynep Esen. After a cartoon and a documentary about flowers in Antalya, the first night ended at 8:50pm with Nuran Ermen returning, followed by the playing of the national anthem.

The first night of TRT's television service had two technical failures, which had the image temporarily substituted by breakdown slides. After the first closedown, the overall talk about the first night continued well into the morning.

On 26 August 1968, television broadcasts from Izmir were first tested, becoming regular in September 1970. That same year, TRT expanded its weekly schedule from three days a week to four. By early 1972, TRT broadcast four days a week. The opening night was well-received, so was the broadcast of the moon landings the following year.

TRT started expanding its television signal starting in 1971. On March 19, broadcasts from Eskişehir began, then on August 30, from Istanbul, still in test format, broadcasting pre-packaged programs from the ITU Maçka Studio. TRT used ITU TV's transmitter; the former station closed as a result of TRT's takeover. By May 1972, it added a transmitter in Balıkesir on channel 7, followed by Istanbul on channel 5 in December that year. In September 1971, it carried the Mediterranean Games. Television advertising started in March 1972. On 26 August 1972, it became connected to the Eurovision network for the first time, for the carriage of the 1972 Summer Olympic Games. One of the more successful early broadcasts was the 1974 FIFA World Cup qualifier between Turkey and Italy on 13 January 1973. The relay network increased in 1973-74, with 28 stations total by December 1974. Around 1975, TRT broadcast from 18:00 to 23:00 on weekdays, and from 14:00 to 23:00 on weekends. TRT's first major series was Aşk-ı Memnu, in 1975, created in part due to the success of period dramas produced in the UK. The production marked the beginning of a television production industry, which grew thanks to the investments private channels had in producing their own drama series beginning in the 1990s.

With the increase of its transmitter network in urban areas, TRT started increasing its airtime. In 1974, the transmitter network was received by 55% of the population, increasing to 81.5% in 1977. In tandem with this growth, TRT started buying more American series and producing more educational content. News content and advertisements also increased. The increase in American content was already noted a few years into the channel's existence, buying series such as The Fugitive, Mission: Impossible, Little House on the Prairie, Rich Man, Poor Man, The Six Million Dollar Man and Star Trek - the last of which came in 1972, when TRT's service went regular. Star Trek, in particular, was more popular than British sci-fi series Project UFO and Space: 1999. The success of American television series has led to the creation of movies inspired by them, including a bootleg adaptation of Star Trek by filmmaker Hulki Saner. By 1979, TRT's television network reached the current Turkish Republic of Northern Cyprus by means of overspill. Despite the success of British and American TV series, TRT still suspended certain productions during Ramadan. For that occasion in 1979, the network pulled out The Muppet Show from its schedule, under the principle that one of its characters, Miss Piggy, would offend Muslims. The move came after a participant in a panel discussion show questioned the consumption of pork in the Muslim world, which is forbidden, and caused controversy.

Following the 12 September 1980 coup, TRT was put under heavy military control. Given the high amount of television users and the possibility that television could have an impact on mass audiences, a list of banned words was enacted. Certain types of entertainment were used as a requirement to provide ideological control, with other types of entertainment and music being banned. By the early 1980s, still in black and white, TRT finally reached the entire country. TRT made its first color broadcast on 31 December 1981, though said broadcasts only became regular on 15 March 1984. That same month, it carried its first satellite broadcast using Intelsat. Full-time color broadcasts started on 1 June.

With the establishment of TV2 on 15 September 1986, the channel was renamed TV1. Shortly afterwards, the two TRT channels started satellite distribution. On 1 February 2001, TRT 1 was rebranded, coinciding with the corporation's relaunch, aiming at family audiences.

On 19 May 2012, coinciding with its rebrand, the channel changed its aspect ratio to 16:9 widescreen and began high definition broadcasts.

== On-screen identity ==
Like other TRT channels, TRT 1 broadcasts 24 hours a day. It broadcasts a short startup at 6:00 AM, where the TRT ident is shown, followed by the programme list for the day, and then the Turkish National Anthem (Independence March) is played.

In the black and white days, TRT used a necefli as a slide during technical breakdowns. It became a symbol of censorship after the 1980 military coup, appearing when inappropriate content was supposed to air.

TRT 1 changed its logo on 9 October 2009, coinciding with its new programming season, ditching the 2001 format. The blue borders were recolored, becoming transparent, and the 1 was placed inside the red diamond, next to the TRT wordmark.

On 19 May 2012, TRT 1 adopted a new logo, without using TRT's corporate logo, featuring a completely different wordmark, next to a white 1 inside a red rectangle. The move coincided with TRT 1 starting its high definition broadcasts. The logo was modified on 1 February 2021.

=== Logos ===
1989 to 1997

1998 to 2001

2001 to 2009

2009 to 2012

2012 to 2021

2019 to 2021 (only used on social media)

Since February 2021

== Shows ==
TRT 1 broadcasts in a large spectrum of programs ranging from news, music, entertainment, drama, sports to education and arts along with commercial breaks. The channel aired many world-known series for the first time in Turkey in the past.

== See also ==
- List of television stations in Turkey
