= Radyo Nağme =

Turkish national radio network

- Type: Radio network
- Country: Turkey
- Broadcast area: Worldwide
- Headquarters: Kızılay, Ankara

Ownership
- Owner: TRT

History
- Founded: 2009
- Replaced: Tourism Radio

Links
- Website: www.trt.net.tr

Radyo Nağme also known as TRT Nağme (literally "TRT tune") is a radio network of Turkish Radio and Television Corporation (TRT). This network specializes in Turkish art music.

== Technical details ==
TRT Nağme is broadcast both on satellite (Direct broadcast satellite, DBS) and on FM transmitters. Although there are many FM transmitter stations only those stations which are mainly directed to province capitals are shown below.

City	Frequency, MHz.
Ankara	102.8
Antalya	92.1
Erzurum	92.7
Gaziantep	102.2
Istanbul	101.6
Kahramanmaraş	107.9
Karaman	106.5
Kilis	88.8
Konya	92.9
Mersin	102.1
