= Diyanet TV =

Turkish TV station run by the Directorate of Religious Affairs

- Country: Turkey

Programming
- Language: Turkish
- Picture format: 16:9 (576i, SDTV) 16:9 (1080i, HDTV)

Ownership
- Owner: Presidency of Religious Affairs of Turkey

History
- Launched: 16 May 2009; 16 years ago
- Former names: TRT Anadolu (2009-2012); TRT Diyanet (2012-2018)

Links
- Website: www.diyanet.tv/

Diyanet TV (English: Religious TV) is a Turkish television station owned and operated by Presidency of Religious Affairs of Turkey. It has a relationship with other local television stations and broadcasts some local news bulletins from 81 provinces of Turkey. The station evolved from TRT Anadolu that closed down in 2014 at 12:00 AM EEST and was rebranded as TRT Diyanet.
