= Radyo Türkü =

Turkish radio network

Trt Türkü
- Type: Radio network
- Country: Turkey
- Broadcast area: Nationwide
- Headquarters: Ankara

Ownership
- Owner: Turkish Radio and Television Corporation

History
- Founded: 2009

Coverage
- Affiliates: TRT Türk

Links
- Website: www.trt.net.tr

Radyo Türkü also known as TRT Türkü is a radio network of Turkish Radio and Television Corporation (TRT). It is specialized on Turkish folkloric music. The network was established in 2009.

== Technical details ==
TRT Türkü is broadcast both on satellite (DBS) and on FM transmitters. Although there are many FM transmitter stations only those stations which are mainly directed to province capitals are shown below.

City	Frequency, MHz.
Ankara	98.6
Antalya	88.5
Bursa	103.5
Diyarbakır	105.0
Erzurum	102.6
İzmir	101.6
Kahramanmaraş	87.8
Karaman	90.8
Kilis	98.3
Konya	107.4
Mersin	92.0
Niğde	93.2
Osmaniye	105.7
Trabzon	103.7
