= TRT Kurdî =

Turkish Kurdish-language television station

- Country: Turkey
- Broadcast area: Worldwide
- Affiliates: TRT Kurdî Radyo

Programming
- Languages: Kurmanji, Zazaki
- Picture format: 576i (16:9 SDTV); 1080i (16:9 HDTV)

Ownership
- Owner: Turkish Radio and Television Corporation
- Sister channels: TRT 1 TRT 2 TRT 3 TRT World; TRT Haber; TRT Spor; TRT Spor Yildiz; TRT Avaz; TRT Çocuk; TRT Belgesel; TRT Müzik; TRT Arabi; TRT Türk; TRT Kurdî; TRT 4K; TRT EBA TV; TBMM TV

History
- Launched: 1 January 2009; 17 years ago
- Former names: TRT 6

Links
- Website: trtkurdi.com.tr

TRT Kurdî is the first national television TRT station that broadcasts in the Kurdish dialect of Kurmanji and in Zazaki. On the channel's sixth anniversary it changed its name from TRT 6 into TRT Kurdi. A 2018 survey of 393 Kurdish individuals from both southeastern and western regions of Turkey found that 59% did not trust the news reporting of TRT Kurdî. The study indicated that individuals who primarily identified as Kurdish were more likely to view the channel critically, particularly in regard to its news content, while those who identified primarily as Sunni Muslims tended to have a more favorable view of the channel.

== Opening and objective ==
The ban on the Kurdish language in Turkey was lifted in 2001 and legal barriers to broadcast in the language were removed the following year. In 2004, new regulations were passed, following which TRT was allowed to broadcast 30 minutes in Kurdish. Turkish Radio and Television Corporation subsequently broadcast programs in Kurdish with limited duration. These limitations were later removed and TRT 6 was launched in 2009, which researcher Mesut Yeğen argues was the result of an understanding that Turkey had failed at assimilating its Kurdish minority. Both the Nationalist Movement Party and Republican People's Party were against this initiative and anti-Kurdish sentiment rose among Turkish nationalists.

In addition, an unofficial aim of the channel was to reduce the influence of Roj TV, which was regarded as the PKK's main broadcast channel. Unlike Roj TV and other diasporic Kurdish channels, the objective of TRT Kurdî was not to serve Kurdish political or cultural empowerment, as researcher Esra Arsan furthermore writes:

In the case of TRT 6, Kurdish culture can only exist within the context of the Turkish state, and Kurdish culture is inferior to the larger political framework of the ‘mosaic republic’ in which all citizens are Turkish in the first place.

— Arsan

== Reception ==
Most Kurds reject TRT Kurdî and accuse it of being a propaganda tool to Turkify the Kurdish population. The members of parliament of the pro-Kurdish Democratic Society Party (DTP) did not attend to the opening of TRT 6 at the time. The imprisoned leader of the Kurdistan Workers' Party (PKK) Abdullah Öcalan also didn't support its establishment with Murat Karayilan calling for a boycott of the channel and its imprisoned leader Abdullah Öcalan viewed it as the American imposition for a solution for the Kurdish-Turkish conflict. OdaTV has also described TRT Kurdî as the most important propaganda tool by the AKP on the Kurds, and Head of the Kurdish Writers' Association Irfan Babaoğlu argued that the station was an attempt to distract Kurds from the lack of overall cultural rights. It has been criticized as portraying the current pro-Kurdish Peoples Democratic Party (HDP) officials in a violent manner in a TV show called Pivaz. In the show, actors play HDP officials of having ties to the Kurdistan Workers Party (which is classified as a terrorist organization by Turkey) or even threatening people who visit the party headquarters of being shot.
