= TRT 2 =

Turkish public television network

- Country: Turkey
- Affiliates: Radyo 2
- Headquarters: Taksim Square, İstiklal Avenue, Tarlabaşı, Beyoğlu, Istanbul, taken over at times by Kızılay Square, Çankaya, Kızılay, Ankara

Programming
- Language: Turkish
- Picture format: 16:9 (576i, SDTV); 16:9 (1080i, HDTV)

Ownership
- Owner: TRT
- Sister channels: TRT 1 TRT 3 TRT World; TRT Haber; TRT Spor; TRT Spor Yildiz; TRT Avaz; TRT Çocuk; TRT Belgesel; TRT Müzik; TRT Arabi; TRT Türk; TRT Kurdî; TRT 4K; TRT EBA TV; TBMM TV

History
- Launched: 15 September 1986; 39 years ago
- Former names: 2. Kanal (1986–1992); TV2 (1992–1997)

Links
- Website: TRT 2 website

Availability

Streaming media
- Turkcell TV+: Channel 45

TRT 2 (Turkish: TRT İki) is a Turkish free-to-air culture and art television channel. Originally operated from 1986 to 2010 before being replaced by TRT Haber, the channel later returned in 2019 under a new format, following the launch of TRT Haber as a standalone channel.

== History ==
On January 15, 1985, the TRT Board of Directors decided on the creation of a second television channel. In March 1986, it was announced that the channel would launch on September 30, where it would broadcast from 7:30pm to 11:30pm every evening. The primary objective of the new channel was to improve the cultural levels of the Turkish population, with highbrow programming compared to the existing channel.

TRT 2 started test transmissions on September 15, 1986 as "2. Kanal" or TV2. Unlike TV1, which broadcast from Ankara, TV2 initially broadcast from Istanbul. In addition to Istanbul, which generated the network signal, it also aired programs produced by TRT's offices in Ankara and Izmir. By the end of 1986, both TRT channels were uplinked by satellite. In 1997, TRT 2 moved to Ankara. By 1991, 97% of the population could receive the channel and broadcasts for 150 hours a week.

On February 1, 2001, TRT 2 changed its format. The new programs included education, culture (documentaries, arts, culture programs and debates), news (daily agenda, economics, arts and culture), sports, various music, drama (drama series, modern adaptations, selected works from Turkish and world cinema, cartoons and series for children).

On January 16, 2018, TRT's general manager İbrahim Eren announced the reopening of TRT 2, as a cultural and artistic channel. One of the goals was to produce content aimed at the youth, which had fled linear television by then. Since February 22, 2019, TRT Haber (TRT News Turkish) became a separate 24-hour-news channel and TRT 2 repositioned itself as a separate channel for cultural and educational programming, arts, talkshows & documentaries, replacing the educational channel TRT Okul. With this relaunch, the channel returned to the air after a hiatus of nearly nine years.

== Programming ==
The channel has a focus on culture and arts and offers highbrow programming. Programmes and content include:

=== Current programming ===
- Cinema 7 – News about the latest cinema releases in Turkey, interviews with top directors plus other features.
- From World Cinemas – A subtitled world cinema film every Friday night.
- Documentaries – Produced by TRT and/or international broadcasters. Examples include "How Art Made The World" and "Pilot Guides".
- Sinemasal – Selected examples of fine and more arty Turkish cinema, every Sunday night.
- European Vision – Following Turkey's progress with regards to European Union membership, Avrupa Viziyonu provides expert advice and analysis on the process, covering all areas from agriculture to youth.
- Rengahenk – Daily programme covering the latest news from the world of culture and art.
- Music – Classical music concerts, ballet and opera, Turkish folk and classical music, world music.

=== In the past ===
Like its sister channel TRT 1, TRT 2 aired many world-known series for the first time in Turkey. Among them were Married... with Children, Wiseguy, 21 Jump Street, Hill Street Blues, Beauty and the Beast, Yesenia, The Young and the Restless, ALF, Los Ricos También Lloran, Lovejoy, Small Wonder, Stingray, MacGyver, Airwolf, The Yellow Rose, Mike Hammer, Fame, The Twilight Zone, Matlock, Crime Story, Tour of Duty, Lottery!, Diff'rent Strokes, Gimme a Break!, St. Elsewhere, Happy Days, My Secret Identity, Who's the Boss? and The Jeffersons.

From 1989 to 2001 TRT Gap was broadcasting on TRT 2 before eventually moving to TRT 3. After the move, it began broadcasting 24 hours a day on January 31, 2001 as part of the corporate logo revamp and restructuring of its channels, which saw TRT 2 relaunched as a news and culturally-oriented channel with rolling news coverage filling up the daytime space left by TRT Gap and cultural programming during primetime.

Prior to the launch of TRT Haber in May 2010, TRT 2 used to function mostly as a news channel during the day and in the early hours with on the hour news plus analysis, local news, economic news, health advice, sports news and discussion. Prime time news programmes also exist in the form of Kirmizi Hat and live simulcasts of the morning and the main evening news bulletins from its flagship channel, TRT 1.

== On screen identity ==
- Like other TRT channels, TRT 2 broadcasts 24 hours. A short startup is broadcast at 5:00 am. On this start-up, first the TRT ident is shown, followed by the daily programme list and Turkish National Anthem.
- Prior to the launch of TRT Haber, this channel was famous for having an on-screen clock at the top right of the screen all the time except for commercial breaks. Since the relaunch in February 2019, it no longer airs an on-screen clock.

=== Logos ===
1989–1998

1998–2001

2001–2005

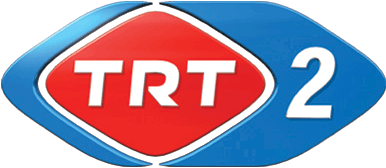
2005–2010

Since 2018

== See also ==
- List of television stations in Turkey
