= Radyo 3 =

Turkish national radio network

TRT Radyo 3
- Type: radio station
- Country: Turkey
- Broadcast area: Nationwide
- Headquarters: Kızılay Square, Çankaya, Kızılay, Ankara

Programming
- Language(s): Turkish
- Format: Classical music, jazz, popular music and rock

Ownership
- Owner: TRT

History
- Founded: 9 September 1974; 51 years ago

Coverage
- Affiliates: TRT 3

Links
- Webcast: Web Stream
- Website: radyo.trt.net.tr/Kanal/3/radyo-3.aspx

Radyo 3 is a radio network of Turkish Radio and Television Corporation (TRT). This network specializes in all types of western music such as classical music, jazz and popular music.

There are also short news bulletins in Turkish, English, French and German. In the past, this network was also used together with TV for foreign film broadcasts. While the TV broadcast in Turkish, Radyo 3 broadcast the original soundtrack.

== Technical details ==
Radyo 3 broadcasts on FM band. Below is the frequencies of some of the transmitters of Radyo 3. (The effective radiated power (ERP) of the FM transmitters are 50 or 100 kW)

City	Frequency, MHz.
Adana	89.2
Ankara	91.2
Antalya	91.6
Balıkesir	91.0
Bursa	87.9
Denizli	90.0
Diyarbakır	99.4
Erzurum	93.8
Eskişehir	94.4
Gaziantep	95.2
Istanbul	88.2
İzmir	88.0
Kayseri	99.2
Kocaeli	105.9
Konya	97.2
Mersin	95.8
Tekirdağ	97.7
Trabzon	105.4
Zonguldak	99.2
