= TRT EBA TV =

Turkish public television network

- Country: Turkey
- Headquarters: Kızılay Square, Çankaya, Kızılay, Ankara

Programming
- Language(s): Turkish
- Picture format: 1080i HDTV (downscaled to 16:9 576i for the SDTV feed)

Ownership
- Owner: TRT & MEB
- Sister channels: TRT 1, TRT 2, TRT Spor, TRT Müzik, TRT 3, TRT Haber, TRT Çocuk, TRT World, TRT Türk, TRT Avaz, TRT 6, TRT Arabi

History
- Former names: TRT Okul

Links
- Website: www.trtizle.com/uzaktan-egitim www.eba.gov.tr

Availability

Streaming media
- TRT EBA TV Live: TRT EBA TV İlkokul; TRT EBA TV Ortaokul; TRT EBA TV Lise

TRT EBA TV is a Turkish world educational television network, owned by state broadcaster TRT. It was launched on 20 March 2020 as a test broadcast and was officially launched on 23 March 2020. The channel was founded following the impact of the COVID-19 pandemic in Turkey which resulted in all schools moving to distance learning on 16 March. The channel focuses on education and broadcasts school lessons for primary, secondary and high school students through separate channels, which are supported by the digital Eğitim Bilişim Ağı (EBA) system.

The channel is free-to-air and available on Türksat, as well as the Digitürk, D-Smart, Cable TV and Tivibu digital broadcasting platforms.
