= TRT Avaz =

- Country: Turkey
- Broadcast area: Kızılay Square, Çankaya, Kızılay, Ankara, Balkans, Central Asia, Caucasus, Middle East

Programming
- Languages: Turkic; Russian
- Picture format: 16:9 (1080i, HDTV)

Ownership
- Owner: TRT
- Sister channels: TRT 1 TRT 2 TRT 3 TRT 4 TRT Haber; TRT Spor; TRT Türk; TRT Çocuk; TRT World; TRT Arabi; TRT Kurdî; TRT Müzik

History
- Launched: 27 April 1992; 33 years ago

Links
- Website: trtavaz.com.tr

Availability

Terrestrial
- DVB-T2 (Kyrgyzstan): MUX 2

TRT Avaz is a channel broadcast by the Turkish Radio and Television Corporation with focusing on Turkey and Balkans. It was launched in Turkey on 21 March 2009 and broadcasts throughout the Balkans, Turkic Central Asia, the Middle East, and the Caucasus.

Programs are televised in Azeri, Turkmen, Kazakh, Kyrgyz, Russian, Tatar and Uzbek with Turkish-language subtitles, and include documentaries, talk shows, culture and music programs as well as region-specific films and soap operas. Audiences also have the opportunity to learn Turkish through tutorials.

The channel's name was announced by President Abdullah Gül as "Avaz", a word that means "voice" in many Central Asian languages.

== History ==
The channel traces its origins to the creation of TRT-INT Avrasya on 19 February 1992 (created per decision of the General Secretariat of the National Security Council under the then-prime minister Süleyman Demirel), a sub-feed of TRT-INT catering the Turkic countries that gained their independence from the USSR in 1991, as means of international co-operation with Turkey. Initially, upon launch on 27 April 1992, the channel broadcast from the Eutelsat V-F7 satellite, but moved to Türksat 1B on 23 September 1994. Since the channel shared studios and resources with TRT-INT, the channel was known under the combined name TRT-INT Avrasya in its early years. Early progarms included magazine program Yaşadıkça, music progarm Asya’dan Müzikli Esintiler and the documentary programs Orta Asya Esintileri and Altaylar.

The channel started broadcasting in Kyrgyzstan on 1 June 1992, between 3pm and 6pm. The channel was criticized there due to its airtime, the scope of its broadcast area and the fact that all of its programs were broadcast in Turkish. Its target coverage area was improved in September 1994 with the announcement of the satellite relocation, which coincided with the introduction of a satellite telephone link from Turkey to Central Asia.

With the TRT rebrand on 1 February 2001, the channel was renamed TRT Türk. The rebrand was used as a means of improving its public image in the target countries.

On 21 March 2009, coinciding with Nowruz, a date of special significance in Turkic countries, the channel was renamed TRT Avaz. The relaunch was marked with a special gala featuring numerous Turkic artists, with Turkish superstar Tarkan taking part at the end. The new name also strengthened its concept as a pan-Turkic channel, emphasizing in three core areas, the Balkans, the Caucasus region and Central Asia.

TRT Avaz launched digital terrestrial TV broadcasting in Kyrgyzstan on 29 October 2018, covering 68% of the country.

== Logos ==
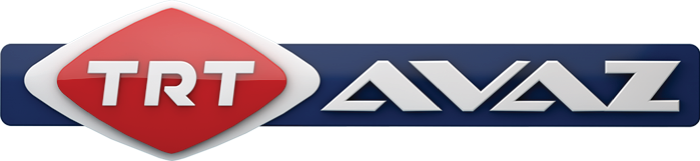
2012 to 2014

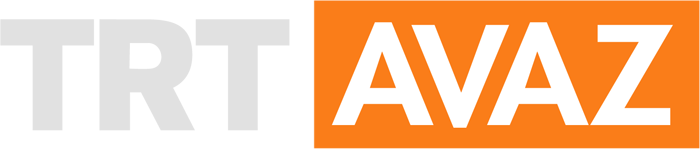
2014 to 2018

New logo

== See also ==
- Turkish Radio and Television Corporation
- List of television stations in Turkey
