= Turkish Radio and Television Corporation =

Turkish national public broadcaster

- Logo used since 2018
- Native name: Türkiye Radyo Televizyon Kurumu
- Type: Public
- Industry: Television station Radio station
- Founded: 1 May 1964; 62 years ago (Corporation); 31 January 1968; 58 years ago (Television)
- Headquarters: Çankaya, Ankara, Turkey
- Key people: Zahid Sobacı (Director general); Ahmet Albayrak (Chairman of the Board)
- Website: www.trt.net.tr

The Turkish Radio and Television Corporation (TRT; Turkish: Türkiye Radyo Televizyon Kurumu) is the national public broadcaster of Turkey, founded in 1964. TRT was for many years the only television and radio broadcaster in Turkey. Before the introduction of commercial radio in 1990, and subsequently commercial television in 1992, it held a monopoly on broadcasting. Later deregulation of the Turkish television broadcasting market produced analogue terrestrial television. TRT broadcasts around the world, including in Europe, the Middle East, Africa, Asia, the United States, and Australia.

Around 70% of TRT's funding comes from a license tax on television and radio receivers. Additionally, a 2% TRT tax was added to the electricity bills until January 2022. As these are hypothecated taxes, as opposed to the money allocated to general government funds, the principle is similar to that of the television licence levied in a number of other countries, such as the BBC in the United Kingdom. The rest of TRT's funding comes from government grants (around 20%), with the final 10% coming from advertising. TRT's editorial stance strongly supports the government.

== History ==
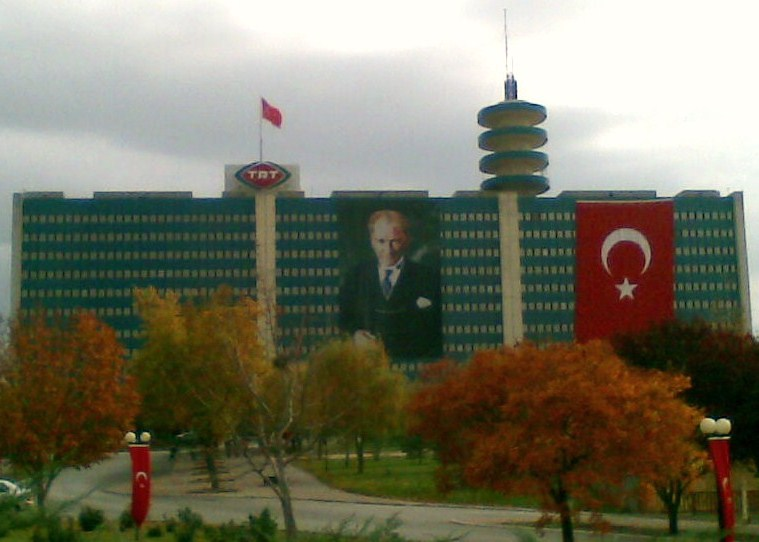
TRT's headquarters in Ankara.

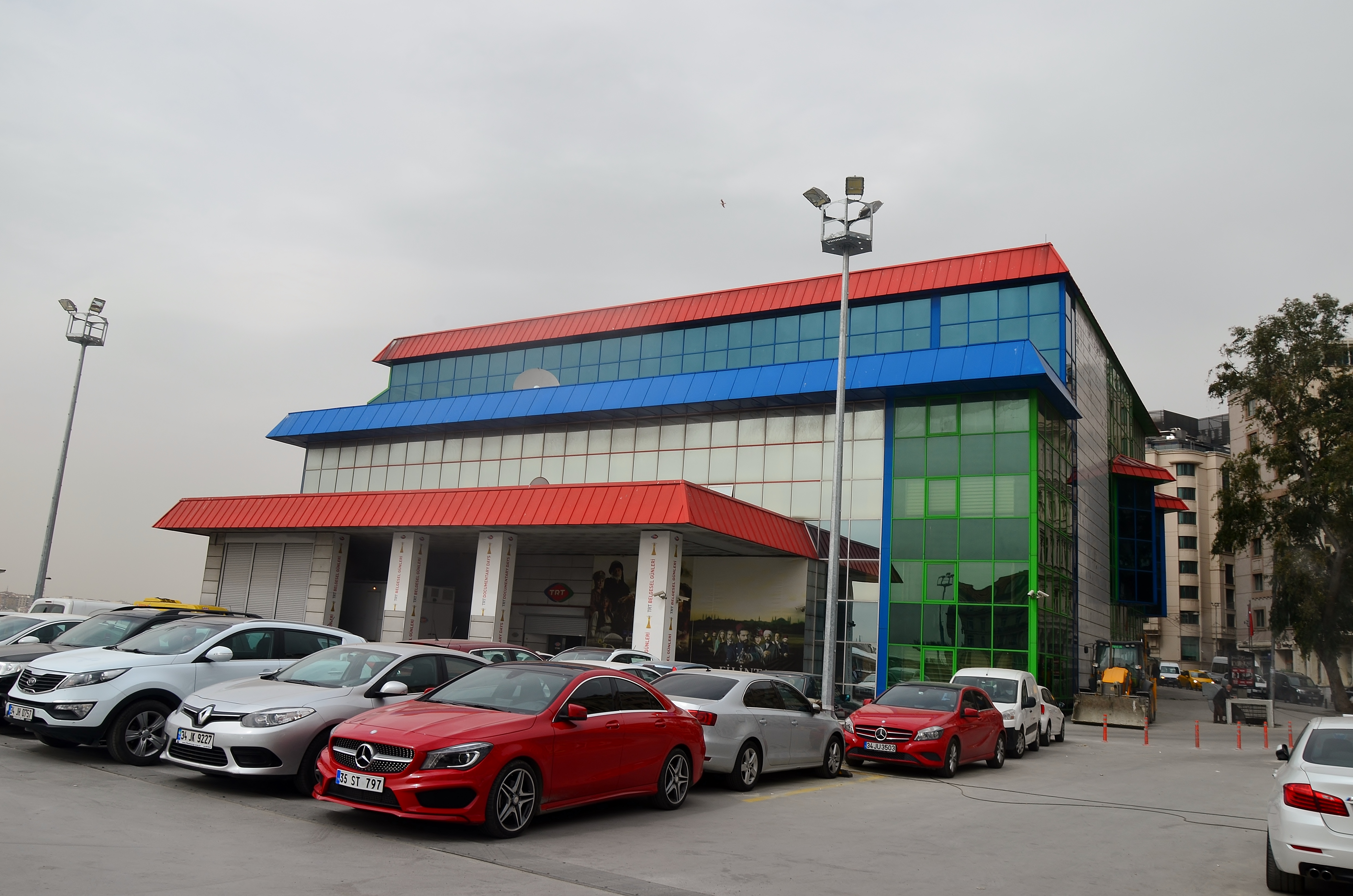
TRT Istanbul Tepebaşı studios

TRT's predecessor, Türkiye Radyoları was one of 23 founding broadcasting organisations of the European Broadcasting Union in 1950; it would return to the EBU fold as TRT in 1972. The original company started radio test broadcasts in 1926, with a studio built in Istanbul in 1927 and a studio in Ankara following in 1928.

Test transmissions started on TRT 1 on 31 January 1968. A full national television schedule, which at that time linked the areas in and around Ankara, Istanbul, and İzmir, started in December 1971. TRT renewed its membership in the European Broadcasting Union (having been a founding member previously offering only radio) starting on 26 August 1972, with Turkey's first Eurovision Network event, a football match (Turkey vs. Italy), airing across Europe on 13 January 1973. TRT also joined the Asia-Pacific Broadcasting Union in 1976, the same year their first colour television test was showcased via laboratory at the general assembly of the Organisation of the Islamic Conference.

All programming was in black and white from the start of test transmissions in 1968 until the New Year's Eve programming on 31 December 1980, when the first on-air colour tests started. The entire lineup switched to colour on 1 July 1984.

A new logo, developed in the United States by Pittard Sullivan at the cost of US$2 million, was unveiled on 31 January 2001. The bulk of the logo used red, representing the flag of Turkey and national pride, green representing its agricultural lands and blue representing its neighbouring seas. The new logo was critiiczed by Turkish designers under the grounds of it being "the product of an outdated image survey", claiming that the idea would be improved if developed within Turkey.

TRT organised the Eurovision Song Contest 2004, with the semi-final on 12 May 2004 and the final on 15 May 2004. On 19 May 2012, TRT 1 HD started simulcasting with TRT 1 upscaled to full HD 16:9 DVB-S2 standard.

In January 2018, TRT celebrated its 50th anniversary. All TRT channels broadcast a collection of old idents and news studio (still being modern logo) as part of the celebration in form of nostalgia. Each day new idents were made. This event also happened in 1978, 1988, 1998 and 2008. On 9 May 2023, TRT Diyanet Children's channel started its test broadcast.

During the July 2016 coup attempt, TRT offices in Istanbul and Ankara were raided by lieutenant colonel Umit Gencer and other soldiers. TRT news anchor Tijen Karas was forced to read a statement from the plotters live on TV declaring the coup. The government has purged the broadcaster's structure during the Turkish government's state of emergency.

=== Directors general of the TRT ===
The directors general of the institution are as follows:

1. Adnan Öztrak (1964–1971)
2. Musa Öğün (1971–1973)
3. İsmail Cem (1974–1975)
4. Nevzat Yalçıntaş (1975)
5. Şaban Karataş (1976–1977)
6. Cengiz Taşar (1978–1979)
7. Doğan Kasaroğlu (1979–1981)
8. Macit Akman (1981–1984)
9. Tunca Toskay (1984–1988)
10. Cem Duna (1988–1989)
11. Kerim Aydın Erdem (1989–1993)
12. Tayfun Akgüner (1993–1996)
13. Yücel Yener (1997–2003)
14. Şenol Demiröz (2003–2005)

== Scandals and Criticism ==
=== Post-coup ===
After the coup attempt, workers in the broadcaster TRT were either fired or forced to retire. According to Haber-Sen Union, 1800 workers were forced to retire. The union protested this situation on 21 November 2018 in Istanbul, Ankara, Diyarbakir and Brussels. During the protests, TRT employees stated that they were exposed to psychological pressure defined as MOBING. TRT employee Osman Köse stated that more than 3,000 TRT employees had been transferred to other state institutions and 5,000 people had been dismissed from TRT. Many TRT employees were dismissed and imprisoned on charges related to the coup attempt. According to the list published in the 'Resmi Gazete' of the state, 312 people were dismissed. According to a report provided by Gülen-linked NGO, Stockholm Center for Freedom (SCF), approximately 150 TRT employees were accused of being members of a 'terrorist organisation'.

=== Election Bias scandal ===
During the June 2015 Turkish general election, TRT refused to broadcast the main opposition CHP's campaign advertisement, which directly criticized the government.

During the 2024 Turkish local elections, TRT Haber aired campaign advertisements for the ruling party on election day, including the party's campaign messages and promotional content. A few days later, the Radio and Television Supreme Council warned TRT Haber, alleging that the broadcaster had violated the law on impartiality and election propaganda by favoring the ruling party.

=== Appointments ===
Stockholm Center for Freedom reported in 2018 that the broadcaster TRT had become subordinated to the president's office following a presidential decree issued that week. The institute raised questions about the broadcaster's independence.

In July 2021, several media outlets reported that, through a sweeping presidential decree, President Erdoğan replaced the executive board with newly appointed members. Critics argued that the new board was filled with individuals who were outspoken supporters of the ruling party, had previously worked for pro-government media outlets, or were known for their conservative views.

=== World Cup 2026 ===
During a match between New Zealand and Iran, a TRT Spor commentator confused the two teams, giving Iran's goals to New Zealand and just kept repeatedly misidentifying the teams throughout the broadcast. TRT later apologized for the mistake and laid off the commentator.

During the halftime show of the 2026 FIFA World Cup final, TRT did not broadcast the halftime performances instead airing commercial advertisements. The decision drew criticism from media outlets and viewers, with some criticizing the broadcaster.

=== Sexual harassment Scandals on TRT ===
There have been several reports of sexual assault and harassment at TRT, on both its studios and television drama production sets. Multiple current and former employees have alleged misconduct in the workplace, and some of them we're admitted.

== Services ==
=== Television channels ===
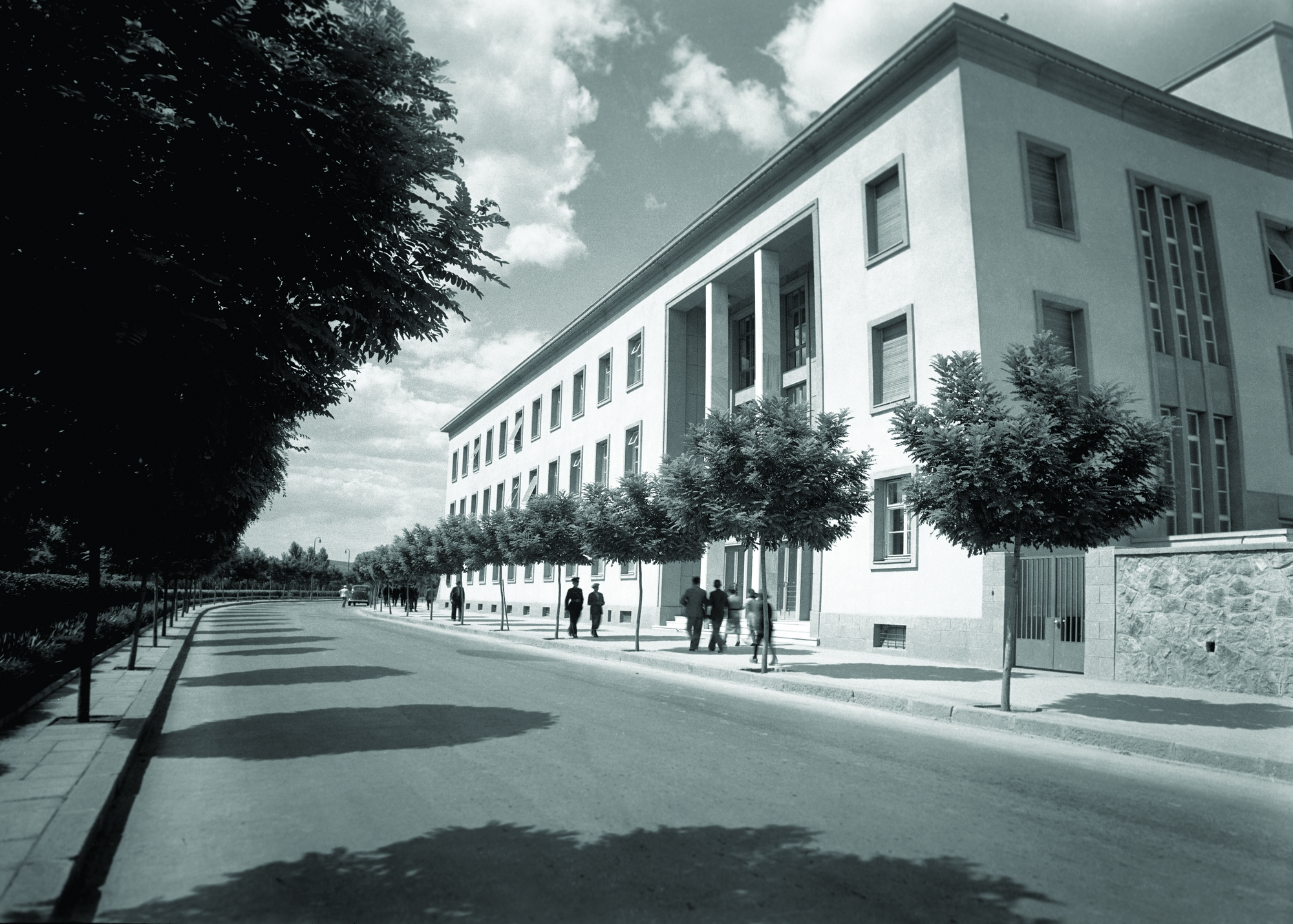
During the days when the photo was taken, Radio Station Ankara used to do live broadcasting. Every Saturday, Radio Kids Club programme was broadcast. Ankara Radio Station started broadcasting at the basement floor of Ankara Palas in 1927. After moving several times, it finally settled in its final destination at the Atatürk Boulevard since 28 October 1938.

All television channels can be watched via Turksat satellite in Europe in Asia and terrestrial in Turkey and neighbouring countries. Some of them are also found on cable TV systems.

==== In high definition and ultra definition ====
Logo	Name	Launched	Description
	TRT 1	January 1968	General entertainment channel with a broad schedule featuring local and foreign series, Turkish and Hollywood cinema, live shows with Turkish folk music, Turkish classical music and pop music, live sport, news & current affairs plus special events.
	TRT 2	launched September 1986, shut down March 2010, relaunched February 2019	Highbrow channel with a broad schedule featuring cultural and educational shows, heavy promotion of the arts (Turkish and international), cultural talkshows, documentaries, and local and foreign films.
	TRT 3 Spor	October 1989	Live and archive sport including Formula 1, World and European Figure Skating Championships, World and European Athletics Championships, Turkish Women's Volleyball league, U18 Basketball plus feature programmes. When parliament is in session, TRT 3 relays live coverage of the Turkish Grand National Assembly (TBMM-TV).
	TRT Çocuk	November 2008	Children's programming, animated programmes and educational programmes.
	TRT Kurdî	January 2009	Channel broadcasting in Kurdish.
	TRT Müzik	November 2009	24-hour music channel with Turkish folk and classical music. It also airs pop, rock, jazz & ethnic music.
	TRT Belgesel	November 2009	24-hour documentary channel.
	TRT Haber	March 2010	News and current affairs, sports news and weather.
	TRT 4K	February 2015	Ultra HD television channel of TRT. This is the first 4K television channel in Turkey.
	TRT Spor Yıldız	September 2019	Alternate sport channel to TRT Spor.
	TRT EBA TV	2020	The channel focuses on education and broadcasts school lessons for primary, secondary and high school students, which are supported by the digital Eğitim Bilişim Ağı (EBA) system.
	TRT Genç	2026	Turkey's young channel. Programmes with technology, science, racing, culture, art and other. The channel's slogan is "Gelecek Sensin" (Future Is You).

==== International ====
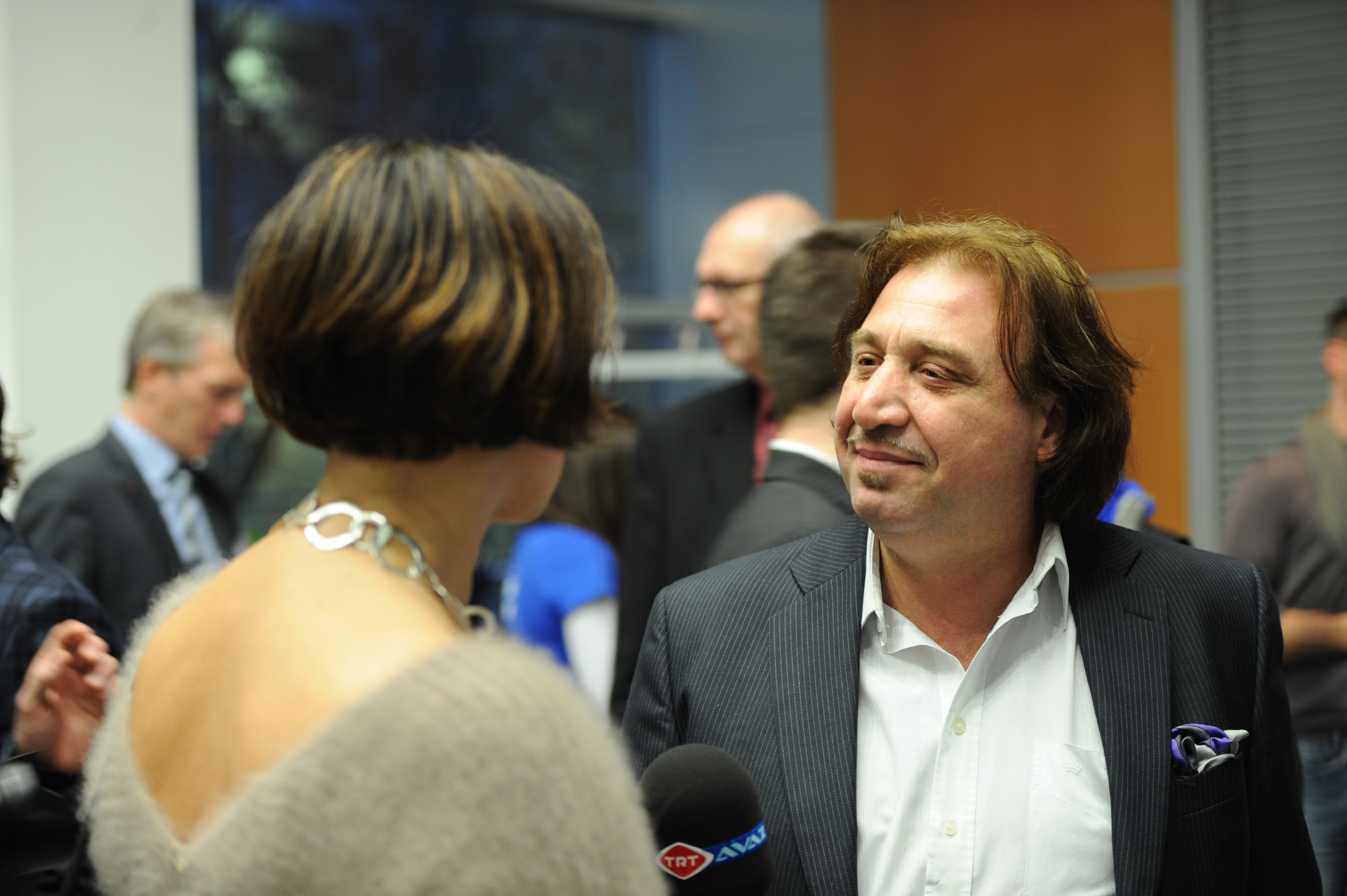
TRT Avaz announcer who interviewed during the 2014 state elections in Austria.

Logo	Name	Launched	Description
	TRT Türk	2001	formerly known as TRT INT – International news, current affairs, documentaries and cultural programming aimed at both Turks and Turkish speaking audience living abroad. It's the first TRT channel to make extensive use of a private production company for news programming.
	TRT Avaz	March 2009	International channel aimed at the Turkic republics and Turks living in the Balkans. The channel has a focus on entertainment and documentaries as opposed to TRT Türk's new focus on news. Programmes are broadcast in a mixture of languages including Turkic and Russian.
	TRT World	30 June 2015	International news, current affairs, documentaries and cultural programming in English for international audiences.
	TRT Arabi	4 April 2010	Broadcasts 24 hours a day in Arabic language with programs aimed at Arabs in Turkey, as well as the wider Arab world and Middle East.

==== Minority languages ====
TRT has a TV channel for Kurdish that broadcasts on a 24-hour / 7-day basis called TRT Kurdî and other TV and Radio stations that broadcast programmes in the local languages like Armenian, Arabic, Bosnian and Circassian a few hours a week.

Another TV channel aimed at the Turkic world, TRT Avaz was launched on 21 March 2009 and broadcasts in the Azerbaijani, Russian, Kazakh, Kyrgyz, Uzbek, Tatar and Turkmen languages; while the TRT Arabic television channel started broadcasting on 4 April 2010.

==== Closing and opening times throughout the years ====
- 31 January 1968: TRT 1 opened at 19:15 and closed at 20:51

=== Radio channels ===
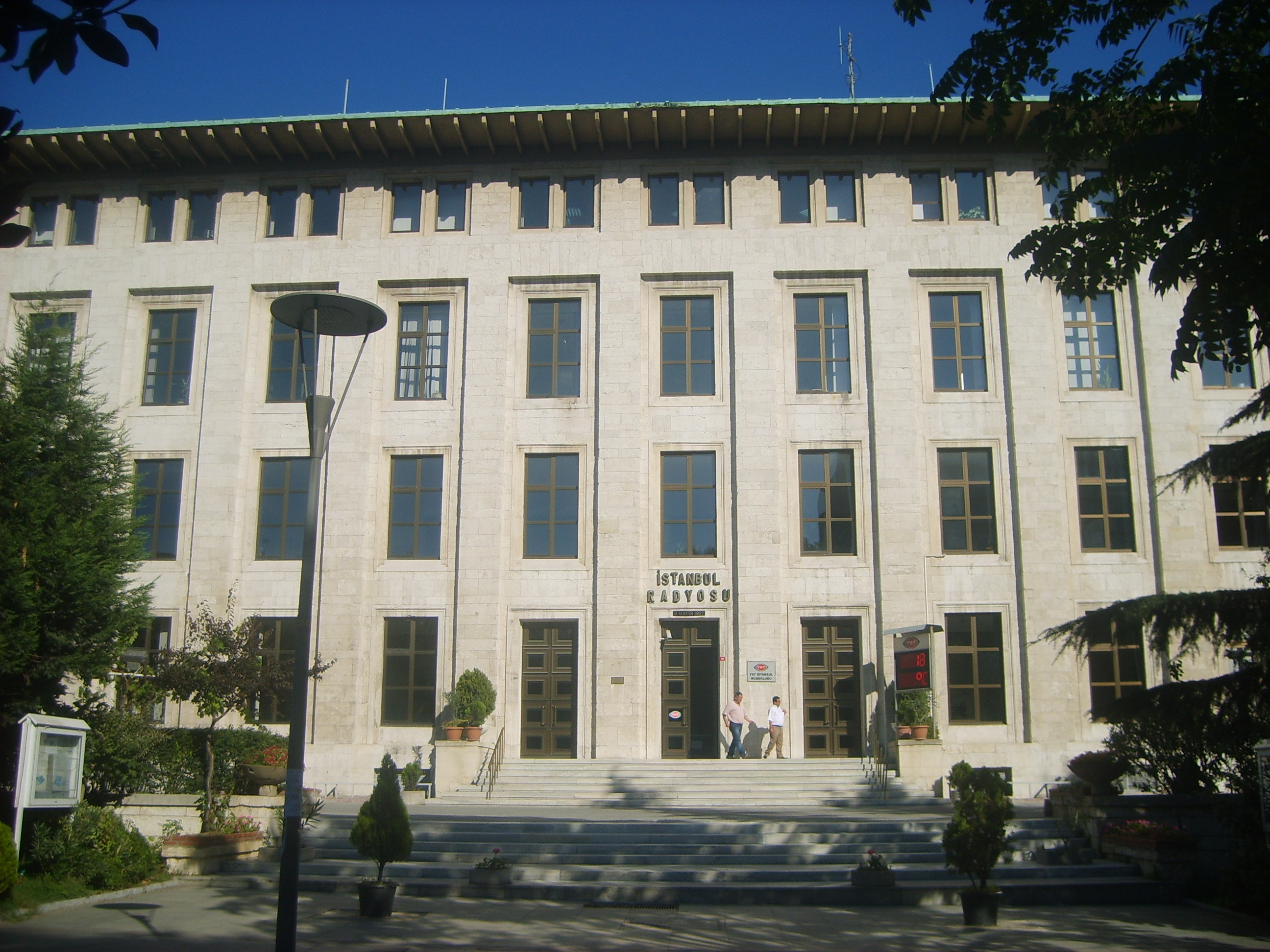
TRT Radio Istanbul headquarters in Harbiye, Şişli, Istanbul

- Radyo 1 (launched in May 1927) – spoken-word programmes covering culture, arts, drama, news, science, society, education and history.
- TRT FM (formerly Radyo 2, launched in May 1964) – A mixture of Turkish pop, folk and classical music, foreign pop, call ins, news and travel information.
- Radyo 3 (launched in September 1974) – Classical music, jazz, world music, foreign pop & rock.
- TRT Kurdî Radyo (formerly Radyo 6, launched in 2009) – Broadcasting in Kurdish language for Kurds in Turkey.
- TRT Radyo Haber (launched in September 1993) – News programmes. Also a sport news, comment with news. Sometimes common voice with TRT Haber TV channel.
- TRT Nağme – Turkish classical music.
- TRT Memleketim FM (formerly TRT Avrupa FM) – Broadcasting for Turks in Europe.
- TRT Türkü – Turkish folk music and türkü.
- Voice of Turkey (launched in December 1982) – Broadcasting in 41 different languages globally.

==== Regional channels ====
- Antalya Radyosu – Broadcasting in Antalya, covers west Mediterranean Region, Turkey.
- Çukurova Radyosu – Broadcasting in Mersin, covers east Mediterranean Region, Turkey.
- Erzurum Radyosu – Broadcasting in Erzurum, covers Eastern Turkey.
- GAP Diyarbakır Radyosu – Broadcasting in Diyarbakır, covers South Eastern Turkey.
- Trabzon Radyosu – Broadcasting in Trabzon, covers Northern Turkey.

=== Mobile/Web Applications ===
- tabii (launched May 2023) - tabii is international watch platform. Language with English, Turkish, Urdu, Arabic and Spanish. Availability content with TRT content, Turkish & World movie/serie(s), documentary, kids content, sport and tabii's originals. Live TV channels with TRT channels, tabii TV, tabii Çocuk, tabii Spor. Sport contents as UEFA Europa, UEFA Champions and UEFA Conference
- TRT Arabi Mobile App - Similar to TRT Haber mobile application. News content is in Arabic.
- TRT Çocuk Mobile Apps - TRT Çocuk's mobile applications with "TRT Çocuk" (mobile app), "TRT Çocuk Oyun Dünyası" (game), "TRT Çocuk Kitaplık" (book) and trtcocuk.net.tr games.
- TRT Dinle (launched 2020) - TRT Dinle is an app used to listen to music, audiobooks and podcasts.
- TRT Haber Mobile App - Embedding trthaber.com web content for news.
- TRT World Mobile App - Similar to TRT Haber mobile application. News content is in English.

=== Teletext and EPG ===
TRT started teletext trial-runs, called "Telegün", on 3 December 1990 on all TV channels. An electronic program guide (EPG) is available on 6 channels.

== Exportation of TRT programmes ==
TRT, recognized as Turkey's state television broadcaster and engaged in public broadcasting, initially captured viewership with imported programs, series, and films from abroad, gradually expanding its screens to include domestic productions and producing its own content. Examining television studies at both international and national levels reveals that the societal, economic, and sociological challenges within countries have consistently been reflected in cinema or television productions throughout different periods.

Turkish TV series, widely popular within Turkey, have now gained international recognition, surpassing expectations and serving as a promotional tool for Turkey, leading the country to become the second-largest exporter of TV series globally As of 2018. Turkey, exporting its TV programmes internationally since 1981, particularly highlighted by the export of the series "Aşk-ı Memnu" first aired on TRT in 1975 to France, has become the second-largest exporter of TV series globally after the United States as of 2019, and in 2022, it is known that around 100 Turkish series were exported to 150 countries, emphasizing the economic significance and communicative role of TV series. Turkish dramas have evolved from domestic productions to globally exported products, competing with local shows and U.S. imports in terms of viewership, and they have also expanded their reach to countries beyond their linguistic regions, including Azerbaijan, other Turkic-speaking nations, and Western Europe, where a significant expatriate Turkish audience resides. Considering all these, it can be noted that "Turkish TV series now reach 400 million viewers worldwide".

Since 2000, Turkish soap operas have consistently grown in production, achieving significant success locally and expanding their influence globally through exports, initially in regions culturally connected to the former Ottoman Empire such as the Balkans and the Middle East, and subsequently reaching as far as Latin America, China, Pakistan, India, Bangladesh, and more. It should be also stated that "after 2010, the film and television sector received growing support from the Ministry of Customs and Trade to promote exports in the sector". It is scholarly stated that "over the twelve-year period from 2010 to 2022, information indicates that TRT has undertaken 50 different television projects in the 'family' genre, constituting approximately 55.55% of the total TV series broadcasting during this period".

Turkish television soap operas blend globalized consumerism and romantic love, transcending national boundaries, yet they also portray traditional family structures and gender roles, setting them apart from the American prototype—a characteristic referred to as the "Turkish touch". Similarly, TV series, initially exported to the Middle East and Balkan countries, have gradually been sold to various countries, including the United States, turning the present-day TV industry into a massive globalized sector and representing a significant counterflow in the global circulation of cultural products. Besides, "Turkish serials for television have typically been sold to international broadcasters in packages of 100 commercial hours per show. In another noteworthy development, TRT has been offering its original productions free of charge for international viewers, either dubbed or subtitled, on their YouTube platforms".

When Turkish exports initially gained popularity in the Middle East and Balkans, there was a prevailing belief that the resonance of content and characters with the cultural preferences of the audiences explained their widespread appeal. However, as research indicates that transnational viewers in the Middle East find the stories, traditions, and family relations relatable to their own reality, it is noteworthy that Turkish TV exports have also garnered popularity in diverse regions such as Africa, Latin America, Europe, and Asia. Overall, Turkey is implementing a new foreign policy, aimed at expanding connections beyond the Western world, grounded in acknowledging historical, cultural, and political ties with the MENA and Central Asia; and the Turkish government is actively striving to establish Turkey as a global and regional leader.

TRT Persian launched in December 2024 aimed at Iran and international news in Persian for Iranian and international Persian audiences. Zahid Sobacı, director-general of TRT, previously said that TRT Persian would be launched by the end of 2024 and emphasized twice that "we must disturb Iran."

== News ==
TRT offers online news services in Turkish and other languages.

- TRT Afrika
  - English
  - French
  - Hausa
  - Nigerian Pidgin
  - Swahili
  - Somali
- TRT Arabi (Arabic)
- TRT Balkan
  - Albanian
  - Bosnian-Serbian-Croatian
  - Bulgarian
  - Greek
  - Macedonian
  - Romanian
- TRT Հայերեն (Armenian)
- TRT Deutsch (German)
- TRT Español (Spanish)
- TRT Français (French)
- TRT Haber (Turkish)
- TRT Kurdî (Kurdish)
- TRT на русском (Russian)
- TRT World (English)
- TRT Azərbaycan (Azerbaijani)
- TRT Chinese (Chinese)
- TRT دری (Dari)
- TRT Nederlands (Dutch)
- TRT ქართული (Georgian)
- TRT עִבְרִית Hebrew)
- TRT हिन्दी (Hindi)
- TRT Magyar (Hungarian)
- TRT Indonesia (Indonesian)
- TRT Italiano (Italian)
- TRT 日本語 (Japanese)
- TRT Қазақша (Kazakh)
- TRT 글로벌 (Korean)
- TRT Кыргызча (Kyrgyz)
- TRT Melayu (Malay)
- TRT پښتو (Pashto)
- TRT فارسی (Persian)
- TRT Polski (Polish)
- TRT Português (Portuguese)
- TRT Tatarça (Tatar (Latin))
- TRT Türkmençe (Turkmen)
- TRT اُردُو (Urdu)
- TRT ئۇيغۇرچە (Uyghur (Arabic))
- TRT Oʻzbekcha (Uzbek)
- Discontinued:
  - Tatar (Cyrillic)
  - Uyghur (Latin/Cyrillic)
  - Turki (South Azerbaijani)
  - Afghani (Southern Uzbek)
  - Turkmence
  - Danish
  - Finnish
  - Norwegian
  - Swedish

== Logos ==
1968 – 1985

1985 – 1990

1990 – 2001

2001 – 2018, still used in some channels until 2021.

2018 – present, first used by TRT World from 2015.

== See also ==
- Timeline of broadcast in Turkey
- Media freedom in Turkey (covers censorship aspects)
- Media of Turkey
- Emel Gazimihal (first female speaker)
