= TRT Türk =

Television channel

- Country: Turkey
- Broadcast area: Worldwide
- Affiliates: Radyo Türkü
- Headquarters: Kızılay Square, Çankaya, Kızılay, Ankara, Turkey

Programming
- Language: Turkish
- Picture format: 1080i HDTV (downscaled to 16:9 576i for the SDTV feed)

Ownership
- Owner: TRT
- Sister channels: TRT 1 TRT 2 TRT 3 TRT World; TRT Haber; TRT Spor; TRT Spor Yildiz; TRT Avaz; TRT Çocuk; TRT Belgesel; TRT Müzik; TRT Arabi; TRT Türk; TRT Kurdî; TRT 4K; TRT EBA TV; TBMM TV

History
- Launched: 28 February 1990; 35 years ago
- Former names: TRT Int (1990-2009)

Links
- Website: http://www.trtturk.com.tr/

Availability

Streaming media
- Ziggo GO (Netherlands): ZiggoGO.tv (Europe only)

TRT Türk is the international TV channel of the TRT.

== Mission ==
TRT Türk's mission is to enhance the understanding of the possibilities Turkey and Turkic republics offer in various fields through programs aiming at the Caucasus and Central Asia. The task is also promoting the image of Turkish people in a multi-dimensional way.

Within this framework the channel plans to schedule programs produced by other Turkic republics along with joint-productions.

TRT Türk is broadcasting education, culture, drama, entertainment, music programs and news.

TRT Türk is broadcast in modern Turkish. Programmes can be broadcast with the addition of subtitles in foreign languages or different Turkish dialects.

On the 21 March 2009 TRT Avaz replaced TRT Türk for Turkic countries.

== History ==
The channel started broadcasting on 28 February 1990 as TRT-INT. It started using the Eutelsat I-F4, leased by Türk Telekom to Dutch company PTT Telecom Netherlands. In October, the channel moved to the Eutelsat II-F3 satellite. A sub-service for Turkic-speaking countries in the former USSR (Azerbaijan, Kazakhstan, Uzbekistan, Kyrgyzstan and Turkmenistan) started on 27 April 1992, as TRT Avrasya. TRT stopped broadcasting using Intelsat on 19 October 1994, moving to Türksat after that.

On 5 November 1996, TRT-INT started broadcasting from the Türksat 1C satellite. On 25 July 1999, the channel started broadcasting to Asia and Oceania, using the Thaicom 3 and Optus B3 satellites. Later, on 7 June 2000, the channel started covering North America using Telstar-5. In addition to the television channel were radio stations Voice of Turkey and TRT-FM.

Since its inception, the channel achieved wide distribution in European countries housing a sizable Turkish diaspora. By the early 2000s, its primary markets were Germany, the Netherlands, Belgium, Austria and Switzerland, and, to a lesser extent, Denmark, Romania, Bulgaria and Macedonia.

On 8 May 2009, following the renaming of the old TRT Türk channel to TRT Avaz, TRT Int renamed, inheriting the name TRT Türk from the Turkic channel.

== Programmes ==
- Açık Şehir – Miraç Zeynep Özkartal
- Bakış Açısı – Nur Özkan Erbay
- Ramazan Sofrası – Deniz Orhun
