= TRT World =

- Country: Turkey
- Broadcast area: Worldwide
- Headquarters: Çankaya, Ankara, Turkey

Programming
- Language: English
- Picture format: 16:9 1080i (HDTV)

Ownership
- Owner: TRT
- Sister channels: TRT 1; TRT 2; TRT 3; TRT 4; TRT Haber; TRT Çocuk; TRT Türk; TRT Arabi; TRT Kurdî

History
- Launched: 18 May 2015 (test broadcast); 30 June 2015; 11 years ago
- Replaced: TRT International

Links
- Website: www.trtworld.com

Availability

Streaming media
- trtworld.com: Watch live

TRT World is a global television news channel broadcast by Turkish public State-owned international broadcaster TRT. It airs in English 24 hours a day and is based in the Beşiktaş district of Istanbul. It provides worldwide news and current affairs focusing on Turkey, Europe, Africa, and Western and Southern Asia. In addition to its headquarters based in Ankara, TRT World has broadcasting centres and studios in Washington, D.C. and London. It is a member of the Association for International Broadcasting.

TRT World states that it is financially and editorially independent from the administration of Turkey, and that its news gathering is just like those of other publicly funded broadcasters around the world, with a mission to show a non-Turkish audience events from Turkey's viewpoint. Its connection to the Turkish government has been criticised.

== Programmes ==
In addition to those listed below, TRT World runs various once-off documentaries. Current programmes on the channel are:

- Africa Matters: Africa Matters, hosted by Adesewa Josh, is TRT World's flagship Africa programme that brings stories from the African continent.
- Across The Balkans: Weekly programme on Balkan issues hosted by Nafisa Latic, prepared by Zeynep Gizem Ozdemir, featuring interviews with guests from the region.
- Beyond Borders: Monthly documentary show presented by David Foster showcasing real people at the heart of the stories shaping our world.
- Beyond the game: Daily sports show.
- Money Talks: Daily finance programme hosted by Auskar Surbakti or Ludovica Brignola with in-depth reports and analysis.
- Roundtable: Hosted by Enda Brady. Roundtable is a discussion programme where guests debate the news from London.
- Showcase: Weekly arts and culture show.
- The Newsmakers: Hosted by Andrea Sanke. The channel's flagship current affairs programme, featuring reports and interviews.
- Newsfeed: Daily show hosted by Lara Kilicarslan, unpacking what stories are big on social media and why they matter.
- Compass: Monthly documentary series filmed globally. Compass is an exploration of issues through art, culture and creativity.
- Inside America with Ghida Fakhry: Weekly in-depth interviews with American opinion and policy-makers exploring the issues shaping US politics, presented by Ghida Fakhry.
- Bigger Than Five: Current affairs program about global issues and international power politics hosted by Ghida Fakhry. Its name derived from Recep Tayyip Erdoğan's saying "The world is bigger than five".
- Westminster Watch
- Decoded
- The InnerView hosted by Imran Garda.
- Strait Talk: Brings audience the much-needed context to stories that are changing the world. It features in-depth analyses of global events. This show is hosted by Ayse Suberker.

== Press freedom and neutrality ==
In March 2020, the United States Justice Department required TRT World's Washington operation to register as an agent of the Government of Turkey, engaged in political activities, under the anti-propaganda Foreign Agents Registration Act. TRT World's argument that it is independent was rejected by US officials who said that the Turkish government "exercises direction and control of TRT by regulation and oversight, and by controlling its leadership, budget, and content."

According to MEMRI's executive director Steven Stalinsky, TRT World is "a propaganda arm of Turkish President Recep Tayyip Erdogan's regime", similar to the Russian RT network. He wrote that the channel gave enthusiastically promotional coverage of the Turkish military's Operation Peace Spring in Syria. Stalinsky wrote that, according to the Committee to Protect Journalists, the government banned critical news coverage domestically. Stalinsky urged human rights activists, journalists, and others not to appear on the network's shows.

Following the 2016 Turkish coup attempt, some journalists who had recently joined the company resigned. One of those who resigned said: "I no longer hold out any hope that this channel will become what I wanted it to become (...) After the coup, it became very apparent that the channel had no intention of actually covering it properly, in a professional, international broadcast standard." The managing editor at the time said that he "never received a phone call from Ankara trying to frame the broadcast or give them talking points."

During the 2020 Evros border crisis, the Greek government alleged that TRT World and other Turkish media produced fake news. The prime minister of Greece, Kyriakos Mitsotakis, alleged this in a CNN interview twice, during which he said that propaganda videos from Turkish media aimed to discredit the Hellenic Coast Guard and Hellenic Armed Forces. TRT World said that Greece sent back refugee vessels to Turkish waters, which was denied by Greece. Conversely, there have been reports by other sources of Greek coastal authorities forcing the refugee vessels back to Turkish side, in a military strategy dubbed "push back".

In May 2025, India briefly blocked the X (formerly Twitter) account of TRT World for allegedly spreading misinformation and propaganda related to India's military operations against Pakistan during Operation Sindoor. The Indian government said TRT World had amplified unverified and manipulated content, including pro-Pakistan narratives, distorted reporting on Kashmir, and dissemination of false claims about Indian military actions. This move was part of a broader crackdown on foreign media outlets accused of violating Indian IT rules and spreading disinformation amid heightened tensions. TRT World's website and other social media accounts remained accessible during the ban.

== Awards and nominations ==
In 2023 TRT World was awarded an International Emmy for its documentary on the Russian invasion of Ukraine, which was titled "Off The Grid".

In 2018 TRT World was nominated in five categories at the Drum Online Media Awards:

- Social Media Team of the year
- Technology Leader of the year
- Breaking News Story of the year
- App of the year
- Technical Innovation of the year

== Notable staff ==
- Ghida Fakhry
- Adnan Nawaz
- Imran Garda
- Andrea Sanke

== See also ==
- List of world news channels
- TRT Haber
