= TRT Haber =

Turkish television news channel

- Country: Turkey
- Broadcast area: Worldwide (Online)
- Headquarters: Taksim Square, İstiklal Avenue, Tarlabaşı, Beyoğlu, Istanbul, taken over at times by Kızılay Meydanı, Çankaya, Kızılay, Ankara station

Programming
- Language: Turkish
- Picture format: 16:9 (576i, SDTV); 16:9 (1080i, HDTV)

Ownership
- Owner: TRT
- Sister channels: TRT 1 TRT 2 TRT Türk; TRT World

History
- Launched: 18 March 2010; 16 years ago

Links
- Website: TRT website

TRT Haber (English: TRT News) is a Turkish news and current affairs television channel. The channel had a logo change in 2013. Turkish President Recep Tayyip Erdoğan has described the broadcaster as a beacon of responsible journalism.

== Viewership and Trust ==
The parent organisation of TRT Haber, the state-run Anadolu Agency, listed the broadcaster as the most-watched news channel since May 2018. However, this claim is not as clear-cut as later findings. The Reuters Institute for the Study of Journalism and the University of Oxford's Digital News Report 2026 and other media organs found that TRT Haber was neither the most-watched nor the most-trusted news channel.

== Radyo Haber ==
TRT Radyo Haber
- Turkey

Programming
- Language: Turkish
- Format: News

Ownership
- Owner: TRT

History
- First air date: January 2011; 15 years ago

Links
- Website: website

Radyo Haber is a radio broadcasting news content founded by TRT in 2011. It was established after the establishment of TRT Haber channel. It was broadcasting Turkey's and the world's agenda 24 hours a day uninterruptedly. It started broadcasting again in January 2017.

== See also ==
- List of television stations in Turkey
