= National symbols of Turkey =

National symbols of Turkey are symbols used to represent the citizens of the Republic of Turkey in Turkey and around the world.

== Flag ==
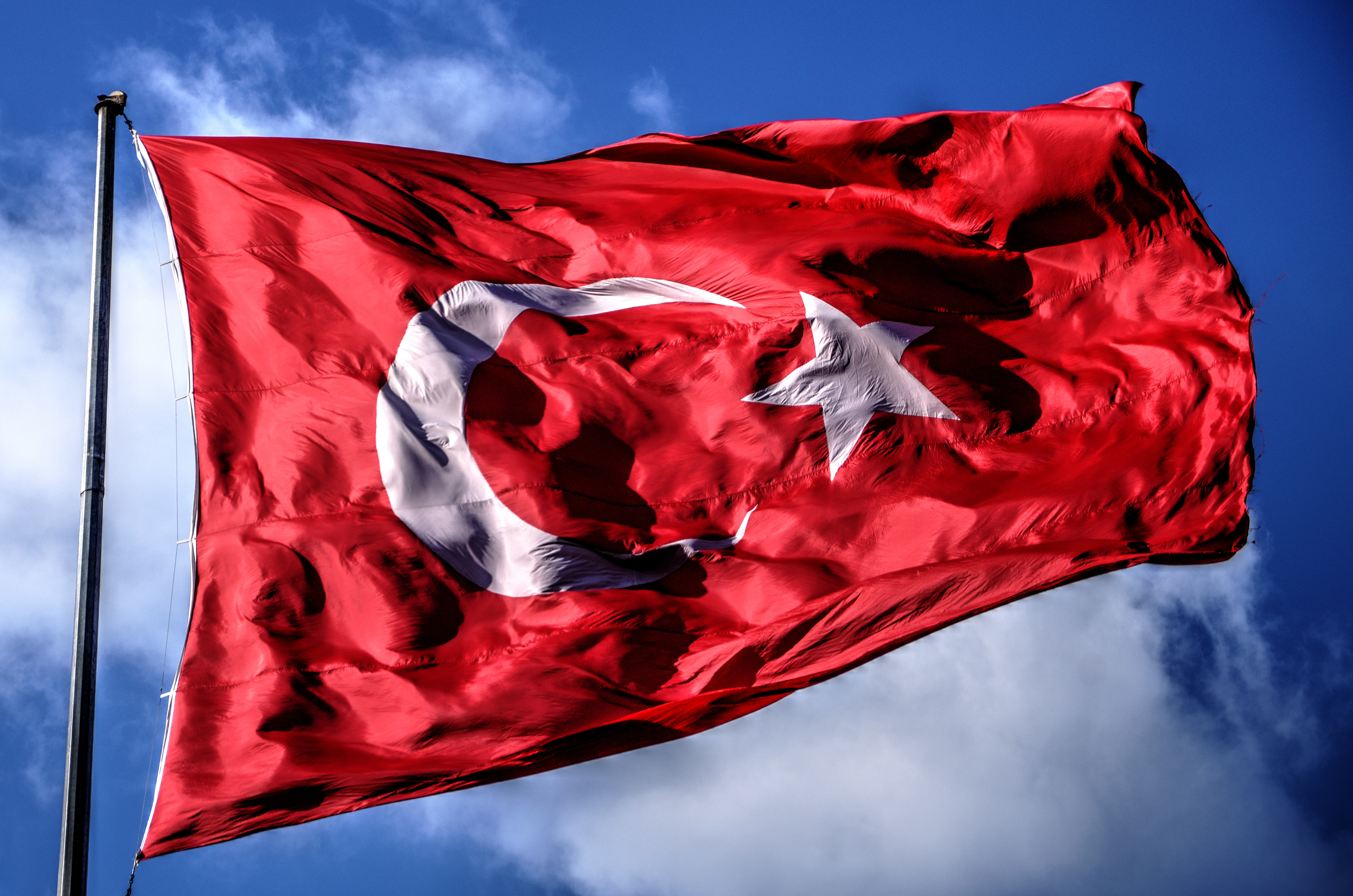
A waving Turkish flag

The Turkish flag is the national and official flag of the Republic of Turkey. Consists of white crescent and star on a red background. The crescent and star flag was first adopted in 1844 during the Tanzimat period in the reign of Sultan Abdul Majid, and it was enacted as the national flag of the Republic of Turkey with the Turkish Flag Law No. 2994 on May 29, 1936, in the Republican period. On September 22, 1983, with the Turkish Flag Law No. 2893, the flag criteria were determined and the flag took its current form.

The flag, which has no official meaning, is blood red, according to legend, and represents the shed blood of martyrs. The image of the Turkish flag was formed with the crescent moon and a star reflected on these bloods at midnight. This legend is said to have taken place in the First Battle of Kosovo in 1389.

== National anthem ==
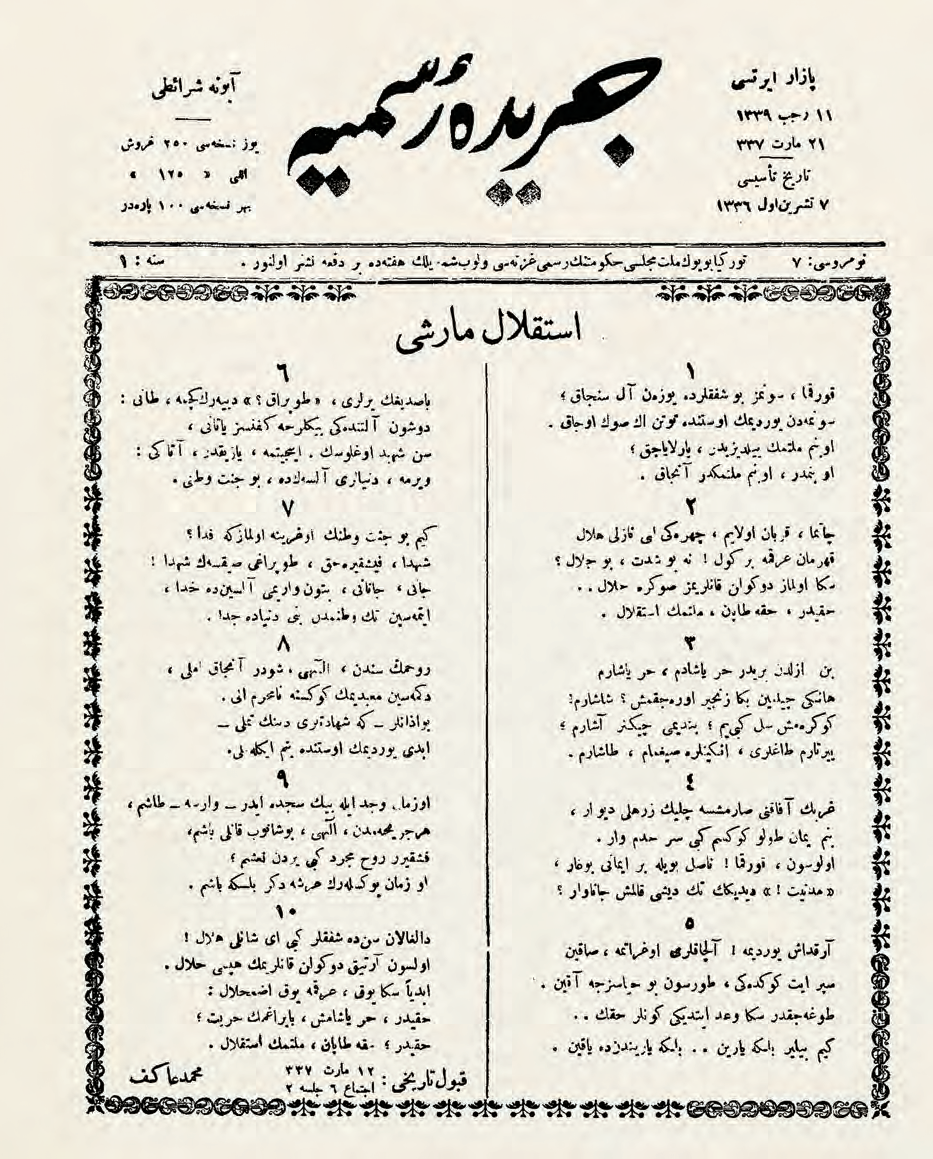
The text of the Turkish national anthem on the first page of the issue of Cerîde-i Resmiye, dated March 21, 1921

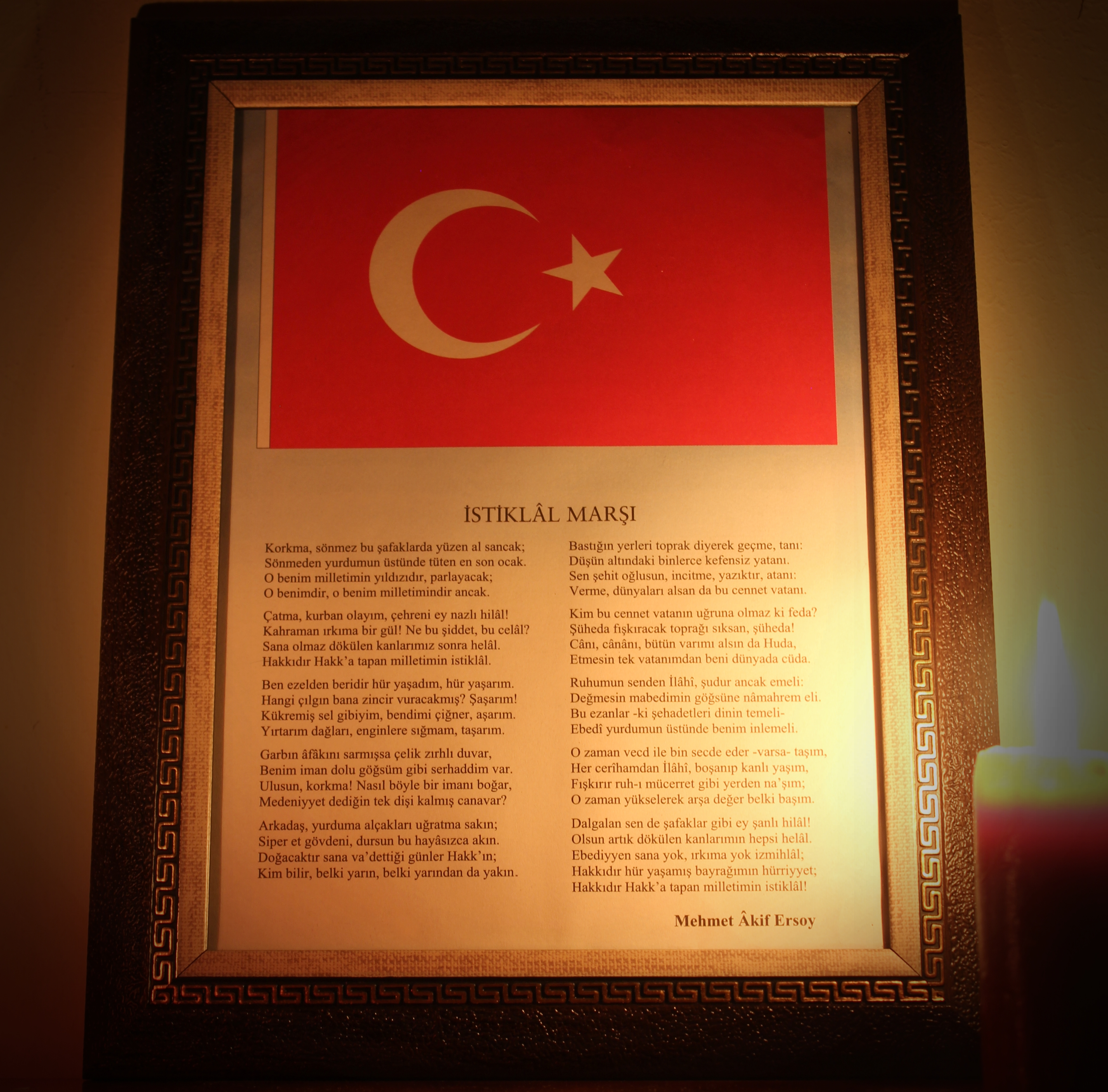
The writing of the entire anthem in modern Turkish

A version of the national anthem recorded in 2013

The Turkish national anthem was written by the poet Mehmet Âkif Ersoy during the Turkish War of Independence in Anatolia.

=== History ===
At the beginning of the Turkish War of Independence, the Ministry of Education organized a lyric competition in 1921 in order to provide the opportunity to win the War of Independence in a national spirit. The Ministry could not find any poem that could be a national anthem among the 724 poems that participated in the competition. For this reason, Mehmet Âkif, who did not participate in the competition because he thought that "the achievements of the nation cannot be praised with money", changed his mind after the invitation letter written to him on February 5, 1921, by the Minister of Education, Hamdullah Suphi, and wrote the poem in which he addressed the Turkish army in his room in the Taceddin Lodge in Ankara. and submitted by proxy. Hamdullah Suphi Bey decided that Âkif's poem should be read first among the soldiers at the front and sent the poem to the Western Front Command. This poem, which was sent, received great appreciation among the soldiers.

The seven poems that passed the pre-selection were discussed in the Assembly session chaired by Mustafa Kemal on March 12, 1921. Mehmet Âkif's poem was read by Hamdullah Suphi Bey at the assembly podium. When the poem was read, the deputies became very excited and it was not considered necessary to read other poems. Despite the objections of some deputies, Mehmet Akif's poem was accepted with enthusiastic applause. Mehmet Âkif donated the five hundred lira award he won to Darülmesai, which was established to end their poverty by teaching poor women and their children to work.

The composition of the poem was delayed for two years due to the ongoing war. On February 12, 1923, the Istanbul Education Directorate was given the task of opening a composition competition. 24 composers participated in the second competition. However, due to the difficult conditions in the country, an evaluation that would determine the result could not be made. For this reason, the lyrics began to be read with different compositions in various parts of the country; Compositions by Ahmet Yekta Bey in Edirne, by İsmail Zühtü Bey in İzmir, by Osman Zeki Üngör in Ankara, by Ali Rıfat Bey and Zati Bey in Istanbul.

The selection committee convened in Ankara in 1924 accepted the composition of Ali Rıfat Çağatay. This composition was played until 1930 and was changed in 1930, and the current composition prepared in 1922 by the then Presidential Symphony Orchestra Conductor Osman Zeki Üngör was put into effect. Edgar Manas made the harmonization of the anthem, which consists of a total of nine quatrains and a fifth, and İhsan Servet Künçer arranged the band.

In 2013, various technical arrangements were made in order to eliminate the difficulty of reading the composition of the anthem. As a result of these regulations, two versions emerged. The first version is prepared for the singing of young people and collective groups, while the second version is used at national and international official high-level ceremonial events.

== Coat of arms ==
The red crescent and star de facto replaces the Turkish coat of arms.

Turkey does not have an official coat of arms. Instead, where the coat of arms is required, de facto (Turkish identity card, Turkish passport, etc.) a red crescent and star without a background is used. With the abolition of the sultanate in 1922, the use of the coat of arms of the Ottoman Empire ended, and in 1925, the Ministry of Education organized a competition to determine a new state coat of arms. Painter Namık İsmail won the competition. However, this coat of arms was never officially enacted and used.

Namık İsmail's proposed Turkish coat of arms

In August 2014, the ruling Justice and Development Party's Şanlıurfa Deputy Zeynep Karahan Uslu officially submitted the "Draft Law on Determination of the Official Coat of Arms of the Republic of Turkey" to the Group Presidency of her party for the design of a new coat of arms.

=== Presidential Standard ===
Presidential Standard of Turkey

The Presidential Standard of Turkey (Turkish: Türkiye Cumhurbaşkanlığı Forsu) represents Turkey and the President of Turkey in national and international arenas. It consists of a combination of the Turkish flag and the Presidential seal. Standard is hoisted to the flagpole at the residence of the president and during his visit, it remains hoisted day and night. In the office room, it is placed on the left back of the desk, and it is pulled to the chromed pole with the star and crescent in front of the car it is in.

The emblem on the flag consists of a golden yellow sun with 16 rays and 16 stars around the sun. There are two different interpretations of the meaning of the coat of arms. According to the first interpretation, the sun in the middle of the coat of arms, Mustafa Kemal Atatürk, "The Republic of Turkey will stand forever." supports the promise of eternity and Turkey, and 16 stars symbolize the 16 Great Turkic Empires established throughout history.

== Cultural symbols ==
Official marketing logo of Turkey with a tulip

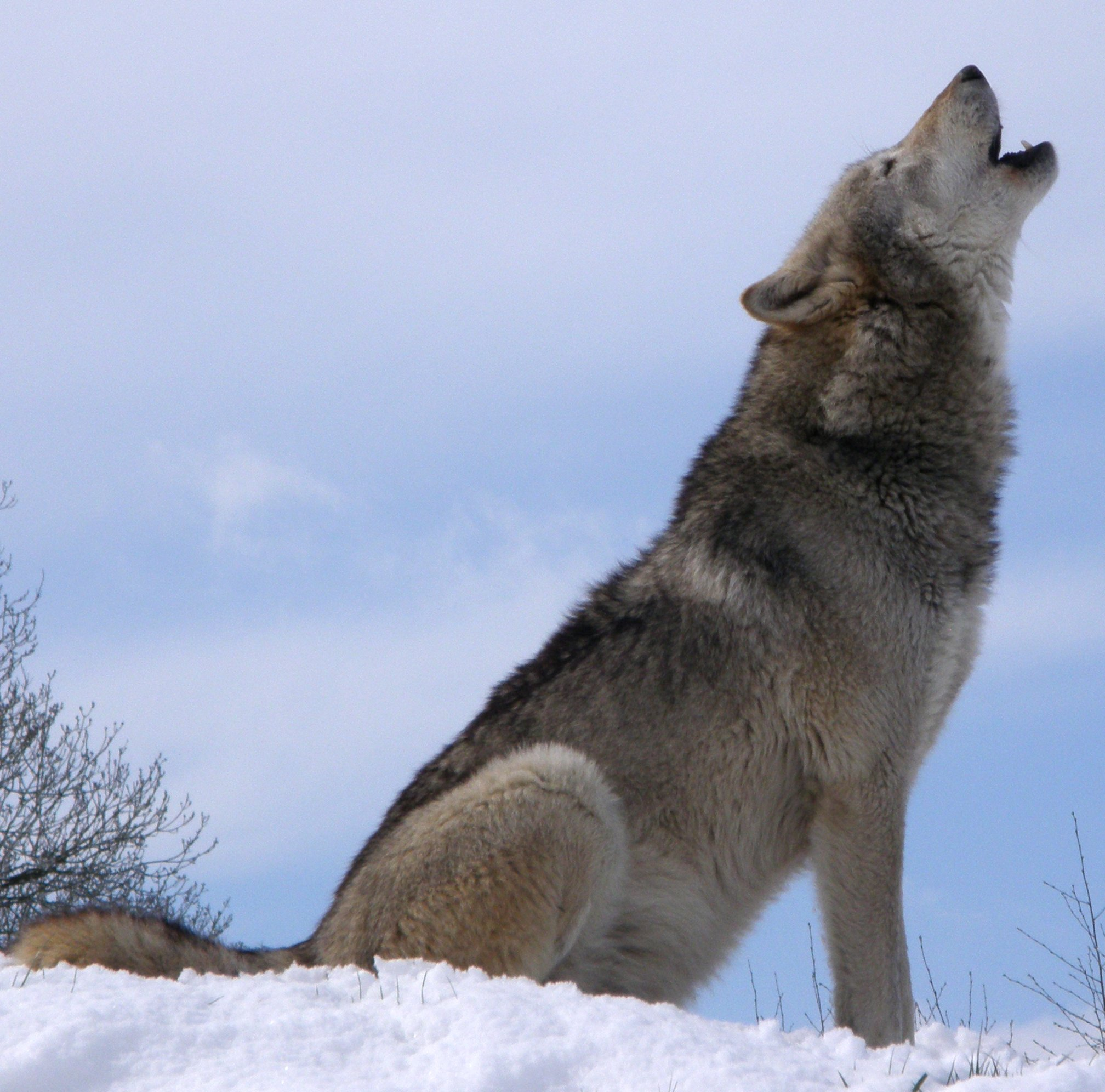
Grey wolf

=== National colors ===
The national colors of Turkey are red and white on its flag. In addition, turquoise, which is a part of Turkish culture, is considered one of the colors of Turkey. These three colors are frequently used in various fields today.

=== National flower ===
The tulip, whose homeland is the Pamirs, Hindu Kush and Tian Shan, was brought to Anatolia for the first time with the migration of Turks from Central Asia.

=== National animal ===
Throughout Turkic history, the gray wolf has been accepted as a sacred and national animal. The most important reason the gray wolf is considered sacred and is the national symbol of the Turks is the mythology of descent from a gray wolf. The Bozkurt is also used as the symbol of nationalists in Turkey but it is originally a mythological symbol of entire Turkic national families in the World. It was declared a national symbol by Atatürk and used in many places. In the first years of the Republic, gray wolf pictures were printed on Turkish banknotes.
