= Manas family =

The Manas Family were an Ottoman-Armenian family that provided Imperial Portraitists to the Sultans of the Ottoman Empire in the later half of the 19th century. Some were also chief secretaries to the Ottoman Embassy in Paris and others were music composers.

== The family ==
The family were Armenians who settled in Istanbul in the 16th century and is believed to be originally from Cappadocia near Kayseri. The family eventually provided successive imperial portraitists in the following years. Family members such as Sebuh Manas (1816–1889), a brother of Rupen, and another Manas named Jozef (1835–1916) both served as imperial artists during the reigns of Mahmud II (1808–1839), Abdulmecid I (1839–1861), Abdulaziz (1861–1876) and Abdulhamit II (1876–1909). Since the brothers were assigned to the Ottoman Embassy in Paris, their portraits were distributed to other embassies throughout Europe.

=== Rafael and Manas ===
Rafael Manas (1710–1780) is the first member of the family to be known. As a youth he studied in Italy and upon returning to the Ottoman Empire, he was an artist for the royal court of Osman III, Mustafa III, Mahmud I. Portraits by Rafael of men and women are found in the Topkapi Museum today. Rafael was buried in the Edirnekapi Armenian cemetery. Rafael's son Manas continued painting. Mouradja d'Ohsson writes that a Manas Manas served as the court's chief artist as late as the reign of Abdulhamid I (1774–1789). The rest of the family took their last name from Manas.

=== Zenop ===
Zenop Manas received his education in Italy. He eventually worked as first secretary and interpreter at the Ottoman Embassy in Vienna in the 1840s.

=== Rupen ===
Rupen Manas was the eldest son Zenop Manas. He was the chief interpreter of the Ottoman Embassy in Paris in 1847. He received a Mecidiye medal in 1854. Sultan Mahmut II sent Rupen Manas to Paris for training in art. He had his own portrait done in oils and then had it displayed at the Sublime Porte.

=== Sebuh ===
The second son of Zenop, Sebuh Manas (1816–1889) was also sent to Paris by Mahmud II (much like his brother Rupen) to attain art training. In 1858 he was working in the Ottoman embassy in Turin, where he remained for nearly 30 years. Sebuh Manas became the chief portraitist for Abdulmecid and Abdulaziz. He received a Mecidiye medal in 1855, a year after his brother Rupen received one.

=== Jozef ===
Considered the last court painter of the family, Jozef was born in 1835 and died in 1916. He is the son of Zenop Manas's brother Mgirdic.

=== Edgar ===
Edgar Manas was born on April 12, 1875, in Istanbul. He is known to be one of the three co-authors of the Turkish National Anthem, as he made the arrangements for orchestra. Artistically gifted young Edgar was sent to Italy at the age of 13 to attend the Moorat-Raphael College to study commerce. While in Venice he also took piano lessons with Professor Trivellini. Upon graduating in 1894, he returned to his native city. Yet, his impulse to continue his music studies took him back to Italy, where he settled in Padua and worked with composer Luigi Bottazzo, focusing on harmony, counterpoint and fugue. Back in Constantinople, Manas pursued his music studies further. He concentrated primarily on composition by examining the classics and the works of contemporary French masters. He produced a series of piano composition in the idiom of Chopin, including "Minuet-Valse" which was published in 1905 by A. Comendinger of Constantinople. During the same year, Edgar Manas conducted the Gallia choral group in a concert at Salle de fêtes de l'Union française, a local auditorium, which earned him the Order of Officier d’académie from the French government. In 1912, Manas made the acquaintance of Komitas, the founder of modern Armenian music. Although their relationship was cordial, it was not particularly close, for Manas and Komitas lived in two different aesthetic worlds. Edgar Manas perhaps is best remembered for his work on İstiklal Marşı, the Turkish National Anthem. In 1932, he was commissioned by the Turkish Republic to harmonize and orchestrate the melody created by Zeki Üngör. In 1933, a choir of 160 members performed his Vatan Şarkısı (National Song) at the Tepebaşı Tiyatrosu in Istanbul. The following year, Manas arranged and published 5 Türk Halk Şarkısı (Five Turkish Folk Songs) and, in 1935, composed Danses populaires Turques (Turkish Folk Dances) for piano, published by Editions Maurice Senard in Paris. A large portion of Manas's manuscripts is reposited at the Charents Museum of Literature and Arts of Armenia. His students included members of the Ottoman Palace, Turkish musicians, such as Hüseyin Sadeddin Arel and Dr. Suphi Ezgi, and Armenian composers, including Ara Bartevian and Koharik Gazarossian. Edgar Manas died March 9, 1964, and is buried in the Armenian Catholic cemetery of Şişli in Istanbul.

== Gallery ==
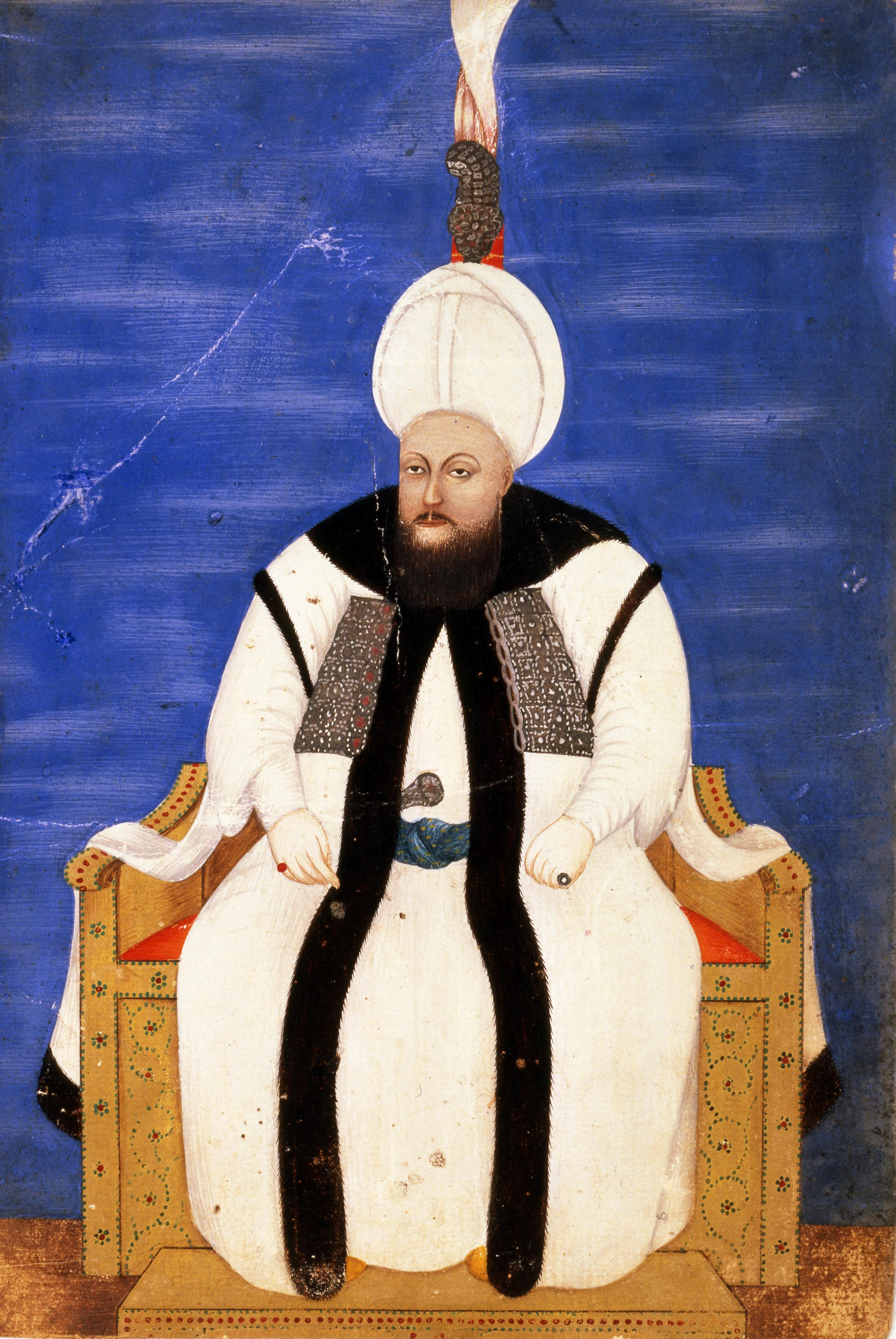
Mustafa III by Rafayel Manas (1770s). Currently in Topkapi Saray Museum.

Portrait of Kabuli Mehmed Pasha (1850) by Rupen Manas. Currently in Victoria and Albert Museum.

Miniature portrait of Abdülmecid I by Jozef Manas

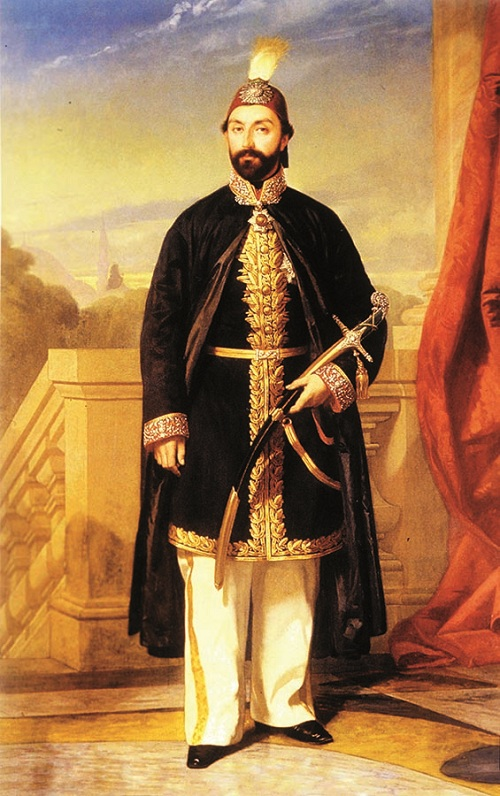
Portrait of Abdulmecid I by Rupen Manas. Currently in Nationalmuseum, Stockholm.
