= Banknotes of Turkey =

Overview of the history of the banknotes issued by the Republic of Turkey

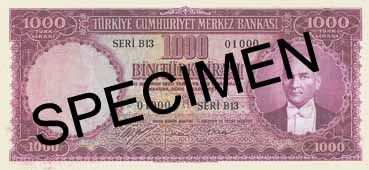
TL 1,000 note of the Fifth Issue.

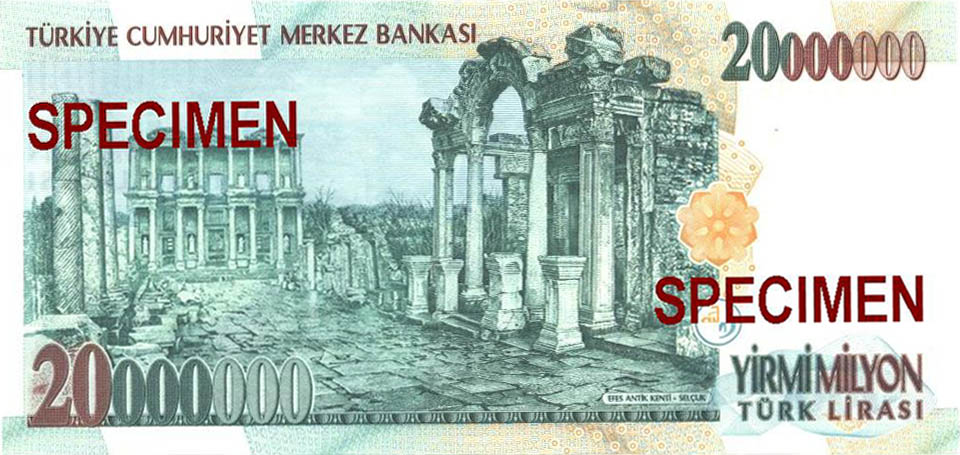
Reverse of the TL 20,000,000 banknote (replaced by the YTL 20 note)

In 1926, the Ministry of Finance introduced notes for the Republic of Turkey in denominations of TL 1, TL 5, TL 10, TL 50, TL 100, TL 500 and TL 1,000. These were the last notes printed with both French and Turkish (in the Arabic script) texts on them. The TL 50, TL 100, TL 500 and TL 1,000 notes carried the portrait of Mustafa Kemal Atatürk.

Between 1937 and 1939, the Central Bank of Turkey introduced new notes with Turkish texts in the Latin script, again depicting Atatürk. this time on all denominations. After Atatürk's death the same design was recycled with İsmet İnönü replacing Atatürk's image. Denominations of TL 2½, TL 5, TL 10, TL 50, TL 100, TL 500 and TL 1,000 were issued. TL 1 notes were reintroduced in 1942, followed by 50 kuruş (TL 0.5) notes in 1944. These two lowest denominations were replaced by coins after the War.

Atatürk reappeared on a subsequent series of notes in the early 1950s. The TL 2½ notes were replaced by coins in 1960, with the same happening to the TL 5 and TL 10 notes in 1974 and 1981. Higher denomination notes were introduced during the 1980s and 90s: TL 5,000 in 1981, TL 10,000 in 1982, TL 20,000 in 1988, TL 50,000 in 1989, TL 100,000 in 1991, TL 250,000 in 1992, TL 500,000 in 1993, TL 1,000,000 in 1995, TL 5,000,000 in 1997, TL 10,000,000 in 1999, TL 20,000,000 in 2001 and TL 100,000,000 in 2009. The higher values of the "E7 Emission Group" banknotes (1992 TL 250,000 and later and higher value notes) were exchangeable for new lira at a rate of TL 1,000,000 to ₺1 at branches of the Central Bank of the Republic of Turkey until 31 December 2015, after which time they became worthless. The TL 50,000 note ceased to be redeemable on 4 November 2009, and the TL 100,000 note on 4 November 2011.

== The First Issue (E1) Banknotes ==
Banknotes of 1st Emission
Image		Value TL	Dimensions (mm)	Main Colour	Description		Date of	
Obverse	Reverse	Value TL	Dimensions (mm)	Main Colour	Obverse	Reverse	issue	withdrawal
		1	166 × 90	Olive green	House of Parliament, Citadel of Ankara, a ploughing farmer	Former Building of Prime Ministry	5 December 1927	25 April 1939
		5	170 × 94	Dark blue	The Citadel of Ankara, a grey wolf and the House of Parliament	Akköprü	5 December 1927	15 October 1937
		10	175 × 99	Lilac	The Citadel of Ankara, a grey wolf	The Citadel of Ankara	5 December 1927	16 May 1938
		50	185 × 108	Brown, olive green	Mustafa Kemal Atatürk	Afyon	5 December 1927	1 April 1938
		100	189 × 112	Olive green	Mustafa Kemal Atatürk	A view of a village	5 December 1927	1 March 1938
		500	194 × 120	Brown and yellow	Gökmedrese, Mustafa Kemal Atatürk	Sivas	5 December 1927	15 June 1939
		1,000	201 × 124	Dark blue	Mustafa Kemal Atatürk	A view from the railroad to Sakarya	5 December 1927	15 June 1939
These images are to scale at 0.7 pixel per millimetre (18 pixel per inch). For table standards, see the banknote specification table.

== The Second Issue (E2) Banknotes ==
Banknotes of 2nd Emission
Image		Value TL	Dimensions (mm)	Main Colour		Description		Date of	
Obverse	Reverse	Value TL	Dimensions (mm)	Obverse	Reverse	Obverse	Reverse	issue	withdrawal
		0.5 (50 Kuruş)	125 × 55	Yellow and light green	Green and brown	İsmet İnönü	Former Head Office Building of the Central Bank of the Republic of Turkey	26 June 1944	1 August 1947
		1	135 × 60	Violet		İsmet İnönü	Bosphorus	25 April 1942	1 August 1947
		2½	145 × 65	Olive green		Mustafa Kemal Atatürk	Statue of Victory at Ulus Square	25 April 1939	15 July 1952
		5	155 × 70	Blue	Green	Mustafa Kemal Atatürk	Security Monument	15 September 1937	10 November 1952
		10	165 × 75	Brick red		Mustafa Kemal Atatürk	The Citadel of Ankara	16 May 1938	2 June 1952
		50	175 × 80	Violet		Mustafa Kemal Atatürk	Angora goats	1 April 1938	2 June 1952
		100	185 × 85	Dark brown		Mustafa Kemal Atatürk	Dardanelles	1 March 1938	15 September 1942
		500	195 × 90	Olive green		Mustafa Kemal Atatürk	Rumelihisarı	15 June 1939	24 April 1946
		500	195 × 90	Olive green		İsmet İnönü	Rumelihisarı	18 November 1940	24 April 1946
		1,000	205 × 95	Slate blue		Mustafa Kemal Atatürk	Security Monument	15 June 1939	24 April 1946
		1,000	205 × 95	Slate blue		İsmet İnönü	Security Monument	18 November 1940	24 April 1946
These images are to scale at 0.7 pixel per millimetre (18 pixel per inch). For table standards, see the banknote specification table.

== The Third Issue (E3) Banknotes ==
Banknotes of 3rd Emission
Image		Value TL	Dimensions (mm)	Main Colour		Description		Date of	
Obverse	Reverse	Value TL	Dimensions (mm)	Obverse	Reverse	Obverse	Reverse	issue	withdrawal
		2½	145 × 65	Purple and brown		İsmet İnönü	Halkevleri	27 March 1947	15 July 1952
		10	155 × 65	Orange and beige		İsmet İnönü	Three Turkish village women in local costumes	15 January 1942	1 April 1950
		50	175 × 80	Purple and green	Purple	İsmet İnönü	Angora goats	25 April 1942	1 December 1951
		50	175 × 80	Blue and pink		İsmet İnönü	Angora goats	17 February 1947	1 December 1951
		100	175 × 75	Brown		İsmet İnönü	A girl holding grapes	15 August 1942	25 April 1946
		500	185 × 85	Olive green		İsmet İnönü	Students at the Technical School, Ankara	24 April 1946	15 April 1953
		1,000	195 × 95	Blue		İsmet İnönü	Scouts	24 April 1946	15 April 1953
These images are to scale at 0.7 pixel per millimetre (18 pixel per inch). For table standards, see the banknote specification table.

== The Fourth Issue (E4) Banknotes ==
Banknotes of 4th Emission
Image		Value TL	Dimensions (mm)	Main Colour	Description		Date of	
Obverse	Reverse	Value TL	Dimensions (mm)	Main Colour	Obverse	Reverse	issue	withdrawal
		10	165 × 75	Red	İsmet İnönü	The Sultan Ahmed Fountain	17 February 1947	2 June 1952
		10	165 × 75	Light brown	İsmet İnönü	The Sultan Ahmed Fountain	15 September 1948	2 June 1952
		100	181 × 83	Green	İsmet İnönü	Rumelihisarı	18 July 1947	10 October 1952
These images are to scale at 0.7 pixel per millimetre (18 pixel per inch). For table standards, see the banknote specification table.

== The Fifth Issue (E5) Banknotes ==
Banknotes of 5th Emission
Image		Value TL	Dimensions (mm)	Main Colour		Description		Date of	
Obverse	Reverse	Value TL	Dimensions (mm)	Obverse	Reverse	Obverse	Reverse	issue	withdrawal
		2½	145 × 65	Reddish purple	Reddish purple	Mustafa Kemal Atatürk	Former Head Office Building of the Central Bank of the Republic of Turkey	15 July 1952	20 October 1966
		2½	145 × 65	Reddish purple	Brown	Mustafa Kemal Atatürk	Former Head Office Building of the Central Bank of the Republic of Turkey	3 January 1955	20 October 1966
		2½	145 × 65	Reddish purple	Light red	Mustafa Kemal Atatürk	Former Head Office Building of the Central Bank of the Republic of Turkey	1 July 1957	20 October 1966
		2½	145 × 65	Reddish purple	Bright green	Mustafa Kemal Atatürk	Former Head Office Building of the Central Bank of the Republic of Turkey	15 February 1960	20 October 1966
		5	150 × 68	Blue	Blue	Mustafa Kemal Atatürk	Three Turkish girls with hazelnut baskets	10 November 1952	8 January 1968
		5	150 × 68	Blue	Green	Mustafa Kemal Atatürk	Three Turkish girls with hazelnut baskets	8 June 1959	8 January 1968
		5	150 × 68	Blue	Blue	Mustafa Kemal Atatürk	Three Turkish girls with hazelnut baskets	25 October 1961	8 January 1968
		5	150 × 68	Blue	Blue	Mustafa Kemal Atatürk	Three Turkish girls with hazelnut baskets	4 January 1965	8 January 1968
		10	155 × 71	Green	Green	Mustafa Kemal Atatürk	Mecidiye bridge	2 June 1952	4 July 1966
		10	155 × 71	Green	Dark red	Mustafa Kemal Atatürk	Mecidiye bridge	26 October 1953	4 July 1966
		10	155 × 71	Green	Brown	Mustafa Kemal Atatürk	Mecidiye bridge	24 March 1958	4 July 1966
		10	155 × 71	Green	Green	Mustafa Kemal Atatürk	Mecidiye bridge	25 April 1960	4 July 1966
		10	155 × 71	Green	Red	Mustafa Kemal Atatürk	Mecidiye bridge	15 May 1961	4 July 1966
		10	155 × 71	Green	Green	Mustafa Kemal Atatürk	Mecidiye bridge	2 January 1963	4 July 1966
		50	160 × 74	Brown	Brown	Mustafa Kemal Atatürk	Statue of Victory at Ulus Square	1 December 1951	7 May 1979
		50	160 × 74	Brown	Orange	Mustafa Kemal Atatürk	Statue of Victory at Ulus Square	2 February 1953	7 May 1979
		50	160 × 74	Brown	Rose	Mustafa Kemal Atatürk	Statue of Victory at Ulus Square	15 October 1956	7 May 1979
		50	160 × 74	Brown	Greyish green	Mustafa Kemal Atatürk	Statue of Victory at Ulus Square	1 October 1957	7 May 1979
		50	160 × 74	Brown	Brown	Mustafa Kemal Atatürk	Statue of Victory at Ulus Square	15 February 1960	7 May 1979
		50	160 × 74	Brown	Brown	Mustafa Kemal Atatürk	Statue of Victory at Ulus Square	1 June 1964	7 May 1979
		50	160 × 74	Brown	Brown	Mustafa Kemal Atatürk	Statue of Victory at Ulus Square	2 August 1971	7 May 1979
		100	170 × 80	Olive green		Mustafa Kemal Atatürk	Gençlik Parkı	10 October 1952	12 April 1976
		100	170 × 80	Green	Greenish blue	Mustafa Kemal Atatürk	Gençlik Parkı	2 July 1956	12 April 1976
		100	170 × 80	Olive green		Mustafa Kemal Atatürk	Gençlik Parkı	4 August 1958	12 April 1976
		100	170 × 80	Olive green		Mustafa Kemal Atatürk	Gençlik Parkı	15 March 1962	12 April 1976
		100	170 × 80	Olive green		Mustafa Kemal Atatürk	Gençlik Parkı	1 October 1964	12 April 1976
		100	170 × 80	Light olive green		Mustafa Kemal Atatürk	Gençlik Parkı	17 March 1969	12 April 1976
		500	170 × 80	Brown		Mustafa Kemal Atatürk	Sultan Ahmed Mosque, Obelix and Hippodrome	15 April 1953	1 September 1976
		500	170 × 80	Dark grey		Mustafa Kemal Atatürk	Sultan Ahmed Mosque, Obelix and Hippodrome	16 February 1959	1 September 1976
		500	170 × 80	Brown		Mustafa Kemal Atatürk	Sultan Ahmed Mosque, Obelix and Hippodrome	1 December 1962	1 September 1976
		500	170 × 80	Violet		Mustafa Kemal Atatürk	Sultan Ahmed Mosque, Obelix and Hippodrome	3 June 1968	1 September 1976
		1,000	170 × 80	Violet		Mustafa Kemal Atatürk	Rumelihisarı	15 April 1953	7 May 1979
These images are to scale at 0.7 pixel per millimetre (18 pixel per inch). For table standards, see the banknote specification table.

== The Sixth Issue (E6) Banknotes ==
Banknotes of 6th Emission
Image		Value TL	Dimensions (mm)	Main Colour		Description		Date of	
Obverse	Reverse	Value TL	Dimensions (mm)	Obverse	Reverse	Obverse	Reverse	issue	withdrawal
		5	135 × 60	Purple		Mustafa Kemal Atatürk	Manavgat Waterfall	8 January 1968	16 May 1983
		5	135 × 60	Purple		Mustafa Kemal Atatürk	Manavgat Waterfall	20 September 1976	16 May 1983
		10	140 × 65	Olive green		Mustafa Kemal Atatürk	Maiden's Tower	4 July 1966	21 September 1981
		10	140 × 65	Olive green		Mustafa Kemal Atatürk	Maiden's Tower	7 April 1975	21 September 1981
		20	143 × 66	Light brown		Mustafa Kemal Atatürk	Anıtkabir	15 June 1966	21 August 1987
		20	143 × 66	Light brown		Mustafa Kemal Atatürk	Anıtkabir	24 June 1974	21 August 1987
		20	143 × 66	Light brown		Mustafa Kemal Atatürk	Anıtkabir	29 August 1979	21 August 1987
		20	143 × 66	Light brown		Mustafa Kemal Atatürk	Anıtkabir	30 May 1983	21 August 1987
		50	160 × 71	Brown	Light brown	Mustafa Kemal Atatürk	The marble fountain in the rose garden in front of Yerevan Kiosk	9 April 1976	21 August 1987
		50	160 × 71	Light brown		Mustafa Kemal Atatürk	The marble fountain in the rose garden in front of Yerevan Kiosk	4 April 1983	21 August 1987
		100	170 × 77	Green	Brown	Mustafa Kemal Atatürk	Mount Ararat	15 May 1972	5 May 1986
		100	170 × 77	Green	Brown	Mustafa Kemal Atatürk	Mount Ararat	24 September 1979	5 May 1986
		100	170 × 77	Green	Brown	Mustafa Kemal Atatürk	Mount Ararat	20 June 1983	5 May 1986
		500	170 × 80	Olive green and blue		Mustafa Kemal Atatürk	The Main gate of Istanbul University	1 September 1971	15 June 1984
		500	170 × 80	Olive green and blue		Mustafa Kemal Atatürk	The Main gate of Istanbul University	9 September 1974	15 June 1984
		1 000	170 × 82	Violet		Mustafa Kemal Atatürk	Bosphorus	29 May 1978	29 September 1986
		1 000	170 × 82	Violet		Mustafa Kemal Atatürk	Bosphorus	17 December 1979	29 September 1986
		1 000	170 × 82	Violet		Mustafa Kemal Atatürk	Bosphorus	10 June 1981	29 September 1986
These images are to scale at 0.7 pixel per millimetre (18 pixel per inch). For table standards, see the banknote specification table.

== The Seventh Issue (E7) Banknotes ==
The notes were given security features. The later versions of the TL 100,000, TL 250,000, TL 500,000 and TL 1,000,000 notes lost their colour-changing ink due to inflation.

Banknotes of 7th Emission
Image		Value TL	Dimensions (mm)	Main Colour		Description		Date of	
Obverse	Reverse	Value TL	Dimensions (mm)	Obverse	Reverse	Obverse	Reverse	issue	withdrawal
		10	122 × 55	Pink and olive green		Mustafa Kemal Atatürk	A group of young students giving flowers to Atatürk	25 December 1979	21 August 1987
		10	122 × 55	Pink and olive green		Mustafa Kemal Atatürk	A group of young students giving flowers to Atatürk	15 November 1982	21 August 1987
		100	131 × 63	Purple and brown		Mustafa Kemal Atatürk	The Citadel of Ankara, Mehmet Akif Ersoy, and his home in Ankara, the first two quatrains of İstiklâl Marşı	26 December 1983	21 August 1989
		100	131 × 63	Purple and brown		Mustafa Kemal Atatürk	The Citadel of Ankara, Mehmet Akif Ersoy, and his home in Ankara, the first two quatrains of İstiklâl Marşı	17 September 1984	21 August 1989
		500	140 × 72	Blue		Mustafa Kemal Atatürk	İzmir Clock Tower	1 July 1983	21 August 1989
		500	140 × 72	Blue		Mustafa Kemal Atatürk	İzmir Clock Tower	21 May 1984	21 August 1989
		1,000	140 × 72	Violet		Mustafa Kemal Atatürk	Mehmed the Conqueror with old Istanbul skyline	31 March 1986	3 August 1992
		1,000	140 × 72	Violet		Mustafa Kemal Atatürk	Mehmed the Conqueror with old Istanbul skyline	19 February 1988	3 August 1992
		5,000	140 × 72	Brown, orange and blue		Mustafa Kemal Atatürk	Mevlana Mausoleum and a figure of Mevlana	2 November 1981	31 January 1994
		5,000	146 × 72	Brown and green		Mustafa Kemal Atatürk	Mevlana Mausoleum and a figure of Mevlana	29 July 1985	31 January 1994
		5,000	146 × 72	Brown and green		Mustafa Kemal Atatürk	Mevlana Mausoleum and a figure of Mevlana	13 June 1988	31 January 1994
		5,000	146 × 72	Brown and green		Mustafa Kemal Atatürk	Afşin-Elbistan thermal power station	28 May 1990	31 January 1994
		10,000 (YTL 0.01)	146 × 72	Purple and green	Green	Mustafa Kemal Atatürk	Mimar Sinan and his work of art Selimiye Mosque	25 October 1982	15 December 1995
		10,000 (YTL 0.01)	146 × 72	Purple and green	Green	Mustafa Kemal Atatürk	Mimar Sinan and his work of art Selimiye Mosque	13 April 1984	15 December 1995
		10,000 (YTL 0.01)	146 × 72	Purple and green	Green	Mustafa Kemal Atatürk	Mimar Sinan and his work of art Selimiye Mosque	24 January 1989	15 December 1995
		10,000 (YTL 0.01)	146 × 72	Purple and green	Green	Mustafa Kemal Atatürk	Mimar Sinan and his work of art Selimiye Mosque	22 February 1993	15 December 1995
		20,000 (YTL 0.02)	152 × 76	Claret red	Violet	Mustafa Kemal Atatürk	New Head Office Building of the Central Bank of Turkey	9 May 1988	9 September 1997
		20,000 (YTL 0.02)	152 × 76	Yellow and orange	Violet	Mustafa Kemal Atatürk	New Head Office Building of the Central Bank of Turkey	3 April 1995	9 September 1997
		50,000 (YTL 0.05)	152 × 76	Green	Green	Mustafa Kemal Atatürk	House of Parliament	15 May 1989	5 November 1999
		50,000 (YTL 0.05)	152 × 76	Green	Green and dark grey	Mustafa Kemal Atatürk	House of Parliament	20 February 1995	5 November 1999
		100,000 (YTL 0.1)	158 × 76	Brown and green		Mustafa Kemal Atatürk, statue of Atatürk in Samsun	A group of young students giving flowers to Atatürk	11 November 1991	5 November 2001
		100,000 (YTL 0.1)	158 × 76	Brown and green		Mustafa Kemal Atatürk, statue of Atatürk in Samsun	A group of young students giving flowers to Atatürk	15 July 1994	5 November 2001
		100,000 (YTL 0.1)	158 × 76	Brown and green		Mustafa Kemal Atatürk, statue of Atatürk in Samsun	A group of young students giving flowers to Atatürk	12 August 1996	5 November 2001
		250,000 (YTL 0.25)	158 × 76	Blue		Mustafa Kemal Atatürk	Kızıl Kule	2 October 1992	1 January 2006
		250,000 (YTL 0.25)	158 × 76	Blue		Mustafa Kemal Atatürk	Kızıl Kule	2 October 1995	1 January 2006
		250,000 (YTL 0.25)	158 × 76	Blue		Mustafa Kemal Atatürk	Kızıl Kule	16 March 1998	1 January 2006
		500,000 (YTL 0.5)	160 × 76	Purple		Mustafa Kemal Atatürk	Çanakkale Martyrs' Memorial	18 March 1993	1 January 2006
		500,000 (YTL 0.5)	160 × 76	Purple		Mustafa Kemal Atatürk	Çanakkale Martyrs' Memorial	16 May 1994	1 January 2006
		500,000 (YTL 0.5)	160 × 76	Purple		Mustafa Kemal Atatürk	Çanakkale Martyrs' Memorial	26 August 1994	1 January 2006
		500,000 (YTL 0.5)	160 × 76	Purple	Violet	Mustafa Kemal Atatürk	Çanakkale Martyrs' Memorial	10 October 1997	1 January 2006
		1,000,000 (YTL 1)	160 × 76	Claret red and blue		Mustafa Kemal Atatürk	Atatürk Dam	16 January 1995	1 January 2006
		1,000,000 (YTL 1)	160 × 76	Claret red and blue		Mustafa Kemal Atatürk	Atatürk Dam	9 September 1996	1 January 2006
		1,000,000 (YTL 1)	160 × 76	Claret red and blue		Mustafa Kemal Atatürk	Atatürk Dam	10 January 2002	1 January 2006
		5,000,000 (YTL 5)	162 × 76	Pastel yellow and greenish brown		Mustafa Kemal Atatürk	Anıtkabir	6 January 1997	1 January 2006
		10,000,000 (YTL 10)	162 × 76	Red		Mustafa Kemal Atatürk	Piri Reis Map	5 November 1999	1 January 2006
		20,000,000 (YTL 20)	162 × 76	Green		Mustafa Kemal Atatürk	Ephesus	5 November 2001	1 January 2006
These images are to scale at 0.7 pixel per millimetre (18 pixel per inch). For table standards, see the banknote specification table.

== The Eighth Issue (E8) Banknotes ==
In the transitional period between 1 January 2005 and 31 December 2008, the second Turkish lira was officially called "new Turkish lira" (abbr: YTL) in Turkey. Banknotes, referred to by the Central Bank as the "E-8 Emission Group", were introduced in 2005 in denominations of YTL 1, YTL 5, YTL 10, YTL 20, YTL 50, and YTL 100. Whilst the lower four denominations replaced older notes and used very similar designs, the YTL 50 and YTL 100 notes did not have equivalents in the old currency. All notes depict Mustafa Kemal Atatürk from different points of his life and images of various historical and otherwise important buildings and places in Turkey.

Banknotes of 8th Emission
Image		Value YTL	Dimensions (mm)	Main Colour		Description		Date of	
Obverse	Reverse	Value YTL	Dimensions (mm)	Obverse	Reverse	Obverse	Reverse	issue	withdrawal
		1	156 × 76	Claret red and blue	Pale claret red and blue	Mustafa Kemal Atatürk	Atatürk Dam	1 January 2005	1 January 2010
		5	162 × 76	Pastel yellow and greenish brown		Mustafa Kemal Atatürk	Anıtkabir	1 January 2005	1 January 2010
		10	162 × 76	Red	Purple and red	Mustafa Kemal Atatürk	Piri Reis Map	1 January 2005	1 January 2010
		20	162 × 76	Green		Mustafa Kemal Atatürk	Ephesus	1 January 2005	1 January 2010
		50	152 × 81	Orange	Light brown and orange	Mustafa Kemal Atatürk	Cappadocia	1 January 2005	1 January 2010
		100	158 × 81	Blue		Mustafa Kemal Atatürk	Ishak Pasha Palace	1 January 2005	1 January 2010
These images are to scale at 0.7 pixel per millimetre (18 pixel per inch). For table standards, see the banknote specification table.

== The Ninth Issue (E9) Banknotes ==
A new series of banknotes, the "E-9 Emission Group" entered circulation on 1 January 2009, with the E-8 group ceasing to be valid after 31 December 2009 (although still redeemable at branches of the Central Bank until 31 December 2019). The E-9 banknotes refer to the currency as "Turkish lira" rather than "new Turkish lira", and include a new ₺200 denomination. The new banknotes have different sizes to prevent forgery. The main specificity of this new series is that each denomination depicts a famous Turkish personality, rather than geographical sites and architectural features of Turkey. The dominant colour of the ₺5 banknote has been determined as “purple” on the second series of the current banknotes.

Current Turkish lira banknotes
Image		Value ₺	Dimensions (mm)	Main Colour	Description			Date of issue
Obverse	Reverse	Value ₺	Dimensions (mm)	Main Colour	Obverse	Reverse	Watermark	Date of issue
		5	130 × 64	Brown	Mustafa Kemal Atatürk	Aydın Sayılı, diagrams of solar system, atom, ancient cave and a left-handed Z-DNA helix.	Mustafa Kemal Atatürk, Value	1 January 2009
		5	130 × 64	Purple	Mustafa Kemal Atatürk	Aydın Sayılı, diagrams of solar system, atom, ancient cave and a left-handed Z-DNA helix.	Mustafa Kemal Atatürk, Value	8 April 2013
		10	136 × 64	Red	Mustafa Kemal Atatürk	Cahit Arf, Arf invariant, arithmetic series, abacus, binary	Mustafa Kemal Atatürk, Value	1 January 2009
		20	142 × 68	Green	Mustafa Kemal Atatürk	Mimar Kemaleddin, Gazi University main building, aqueduct, circular motif and cube-globe-cylinder symbolizing architecture	Mustafa Kemal Atatürk, Value	1 January 2009
		50	148 × 68	Orange	Mustafa Kemal Atatürk	Fatma Aliye Topuz, flower and literary figures	Mustafa Kemal Atatürk, Value	1 January 2009
		100	154 × 72	Blue	Mustafa Kemal Atatürk	Buhurizade Itri, notes, instruments and Mevlevi figure	Mustafa Kemal Atatürk, Value	1 January 2009
		200	160 × 72	Pink	Mustafa Kemal Atatürk	Yunus Emre, Yunus's mausoleum, rose, pigeon and the line "Sevelim, sevilelim" (Let us love, let us be loved)	Mustafa Kemal Atatürk, Value	1 January 2009
These images are to scale at 0.7 pixel per millimetre (18 pixel per inch). For table standards, see the banknote specification table.

== See also ==
- Turkish lira
- Economy of Turkey
- Economy of the Turkish Republic of Northern Cyprus
- Coins of Turkey
