= Üngör =

Üngör is a Turkish surname. Notable people with the surname include:

- Osman Zeki Üngör (1880–1958), Turkish composer and violinist
- Nazan Eckes (née Üngör; 1976), German television presenter
- Uğur Ümit Üngör (born 1980), Dutch scholar of genocide and mass violence
