= Ali Rıfat Çağatay =

Turkish musician

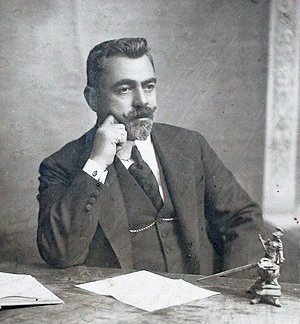
Ali Rıfat Çağatay, 1910s

Ali Rıfat Çağatay (1867–1935) was a Turkish composer, oud virtuoso and academic, who served as the founding president of the Türk Musikisi Ocağı (The Institute for Turkish Music) and the long-term president of the Şark Musiki Cemiyeti (The Society for Eastern Music).

He was noted for his efforts to harmonize classical Turkish music with elements of Western musical heritage, his vocal abilities, as well as his talents on the oud, the violoncello, the tanbur, and the kemenche.

Notable works include the original musical arrangement for the Turkish national anthem, used between 1924 and 1930 until the acceptance of the new composition by Osman Zeki Üngör, as well as other national favorites.

== Biography ==
Born in Istanbul in 1867, Çağatay was the eldest of four sons, born to a family of musicians, poets, writers, soldiers and medium-rank government employees. He married the Egyptian Princess Zahra a younger Halfsister to Prince Said Halim Pasha and got a son, Cafer Çağatay, who was a notable football player for Fenerbahçe. After the death of Princess Zahra in 1922, he married secondly in 1923 Nimet Khanum.

Çağatay died on 3 March 1935 in Istanbul.

== See also ==
- İstiklâl Marşı
- Mehmet Akif Ersoy
