= Fasl-ı Cedid =

Ottoman musical ensemble

The Fasl-ı Cedid (The New Fasıl) was a musical ensemble of Classical Turkish Music operating within the organization of the Ottoman Imperial Orchestra, specializing in performances of Fasıl.

== History ==
The Fasl-ı Cedid was established by Santuri Hilmi Bey, a well-regarded musician in the Ottoman Imperial Court, with the endorsement of Sultan Mahmud II, as part of the reforms taking place in the Empire to westernize all government functions and institutions, including those relating to state-sponsored musical education. The Imperial orchestra split in two: the Fasl-i-Atik, playing classical fasil, and Fasl-ı Cedid, playing a more modern (Western) style with Western instruments.

== Structure ==
The ensemble was typically made up of neys, flutes, and mandolins, variously complemented by violins, violoncellos, lutes, guitars, trombones and castanets. More traditional saz elements such as ouds, neys, kanuns and zills generally accompanied these instruments.

The compositions performed featured makams closer to the melodic structures, keys and chords as defined by a western understanding of scale, i.e. major and minor, and generally were of peşrev, saz semâ'î, canzone, köçekçe and oyun havası performances.
