= Turkish lira =

Currency of Turkey

Türk lirası (Turkish) TL
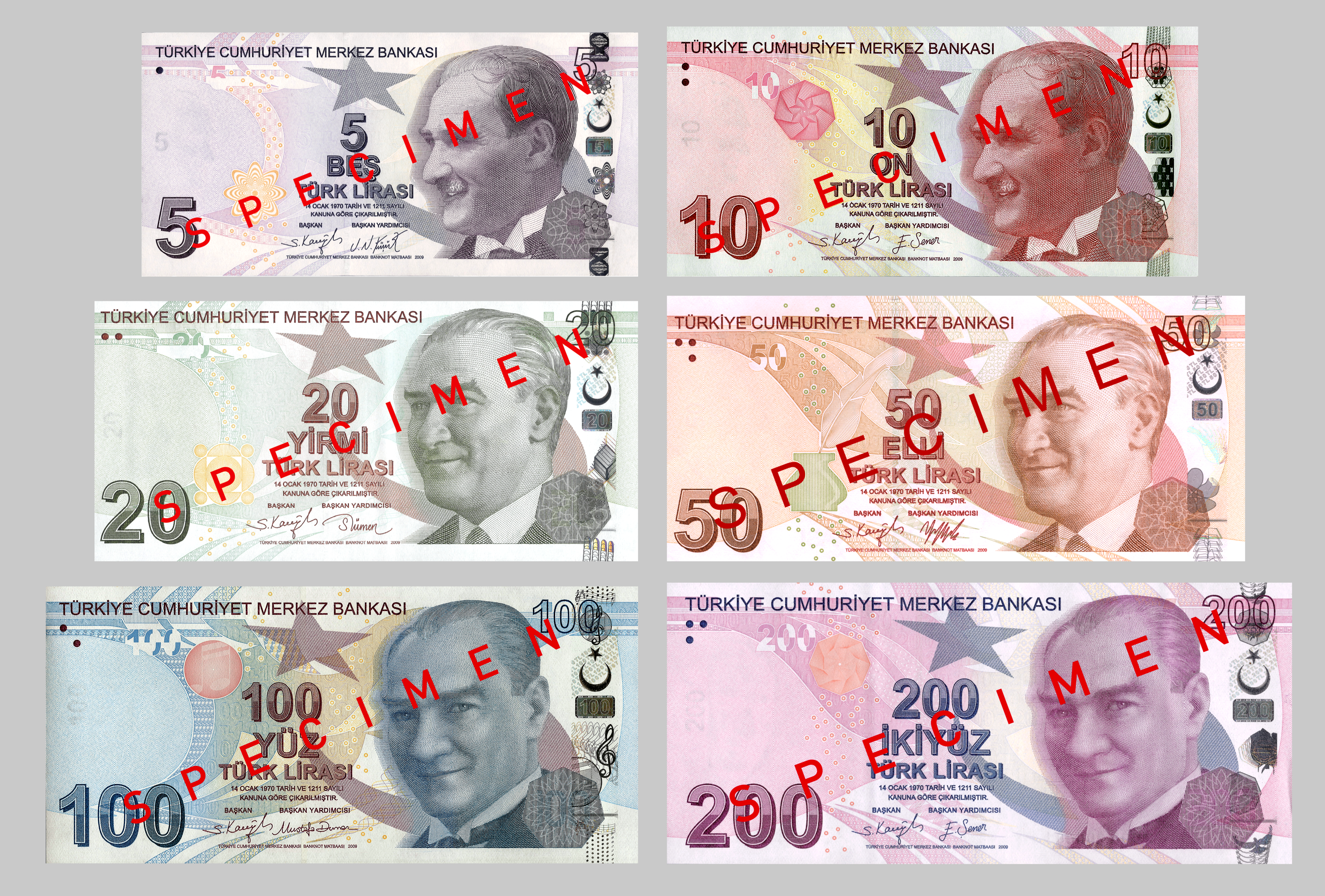
Banknotes
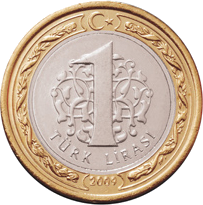
₺1 coin

ISO 4217
- Code: TRY (numeric: 949) (before 2006: TRL)
- Subunit: 0.01

Units of account
- Base unit: Lira
- Plural: liralar^{[a]}
- Symbol: TL, ₺
- Subunit
- 1/100: Kuruş
- Symbol
- Kuruş: kr

Denominations
- Banknotes
- Freq. used: ₺5, ₺10, ₺20, ₺50, ₺100, ₺200
- Coins
- Freq. used: ₺1, ₺5
- Rarely used: 1kr, 5kr, 10kr, 25kr, 50kr

Demographics
- User(s): Turkey; Northern Cyprus

Issuance
- Central bank: Central Bank of the Republic of Turkey
- Website: www.tcmb.gov.tr
- Printer: CBRT Banknote Printer
- Website: www.tcmb.gov.tr
- Mint: Turkish State Mint
- Website: www.darphane.gov.tr

Valuation
- Inflation: 31.10%
- Source: YCharts .
- Method: CPI
- ^a The plural is rarely used (mostly as an indefinite noun) and it is never used when referring to amounts, e.g. üç lira (three lira), bin lira (one thousand lira).

The lira (Turkish: Türk lirası; sign: ₺; ISO 4217 code: TRY; abbreviation: TL) is the official currency of Turkey. It is also legal tender in the de facto state of the Turkish Republic of Northern Cyprus. One lira is divided into one hundred kuruş. The First Turkish lira could be further subdivided, where one kuruş was equal to 40 para.

The current lira is the Second Turkish lira, having succeeded the first Turkish lira in 2005 which in turn succeeded the Ottoman lira in 1923. Since 2018 the Turkish lira has been in crisis, having plummeted in value following Turkish president Erdoğan's economic and political policies.

== History ==
=== Ottoman lira (1844–1923) ===
The lira, along with the related currencies of Europe and the Middle East, has its roots in the ancient Roman unit of weight known as the libra which referred to the Troy pound of silver. The Roman libra adoption of the currency spread it throughout Europe and the Near East, where it continued to be used into medieval times. The Turkish lira, the French livre (until 1794), the Italian lira (until 2002), Lebanese pound and the pound unit of account in sterling (a translation of the Latin libra; the word "pound" as a unit of weight is still abbreviated as "lb.") are the modern descendants of the ancient currency.

The lira was introduced as the main unit of account in 1844, with the former currency, kuruş, remaining as a 1/100 subdivision. The Ottoman lira remained in circulation until the end of 1927.

=== First Turkish lira (1923–2005) ===
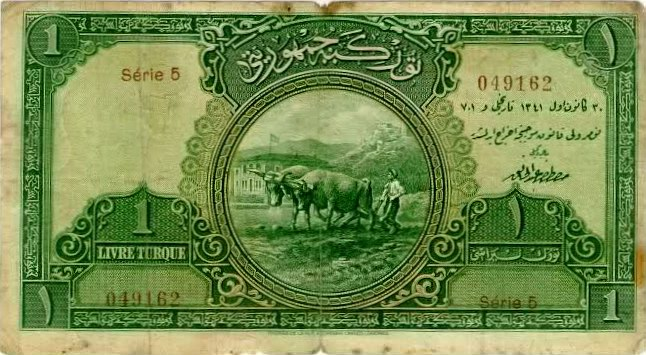
Both Livre Turque (in French) and تورك لیراسی (in Ottoman Turkish) phrases used on first-issue banknotes.

The banknotes of the first and second issue depict Mustafa Kemal Atatürk on the obverse side. This change was done according to the 12 January 1926 issue of the official gazette. After Atatürk's death, his portrait was replaced with one of İsmet İnönü for the third and fourth issues. Atatürk returned for the fifth issue and all subsequent issues.

After periods of the lira pegged to sterling and the franc, a peg of TL 2.8 = US$1 was adopted in 1946 and maintained until 1960, when the currency was devalued to TL 9 = US$1. From 1970, a series of hard, then soft pegs to the dollar operated as the value of the Turkish lira began to fall.

The following are based on yearly averages:

- 1960s: US$1 = TL 9
- 1970: US$1 = TL 11.30
- 1975: US$1 = TL 14.40
- 1980: US$1 = TL 80
- 1985: US$1 = TL 500
- 1990: US$1 = TL 2,500
- 1995: US$1 = TL 43,000
- 2000: US$1 = TL 620,000
- 2001: US$1 = TL 1,250,000
- 2005: US$1 = TL 1,350,000

The Guinness Book of Records ranked the Turkish lira as the world's least valuable currency in 1995 and 1996, and again from 1999 to 2004. The lira's value had fallen so far that one original gold lira coin could be sold for TL 154,400,000 before the 2005 revaluation.

=== Second Turkish lira (2005–present) ===
The Turkish lira has a history of accelerating loss of value relative to the euro, breaching the mark of ₺5 per euro in early 2018

On 28 January 2004, the Grand National Assembly of Turkey passed a law that allowed for redenomination by the removal of six zeros from the Turkish lira, and the creation of a new currency. It was introduced on 1 January 2005, replacing the previous Turkish lira (which remained valid in circulation until the end of 2005) at a rate of YTL 1 (ISO 4217 code "TRY") = TL 1,000,000 in old lira (ISO 4217 code "TRL"). With the revaluation of the Turkish lira, the Romanian leu (also revalued in July 2005) briefly became the world's least valued currency unit. At the same time, the Government introduced two new banknotes with the denominations of ₺50 and ₺100.

In the transition period between January 2005 and December 2008, the second Turkish lira was officially called Yeni Türk lirası ("New Turkish lira"). The letter "Y" in the currency code was taken from the Turkish word yeni, meaning new. It was officially abbreviated "YTL" and subdivided into 100 new kuruş (yeni kuruş). Starting in January 2009, the "new" marking was removed from the second Turkish lira, its official name becoming just "Turkish lira" again, abbreviated "TL". All obverse sides of current banknotes have portraits of Mustafa Kemal Atatürk. The reverse sides of all coins (except for ₺1 commemorative coins) have portraits of Mustafa Kemal Atatürk. Since 2012, 9 different ₺1 circulating commemorative coins were introduced.

=== 2018–present currency crisis ===
In 2018, the lira's exchange rate deteriorated rapidly, reaching ₺4.5 per US dollar by mid-May and ₺4.9 a week later. Economists generally attributed the accelerating loss of value to Recep Tayyip Erdoğan preventing the Central Bank of the Republic of Turkey from making necessary interest rate adjustments. Erdoğan, who claimed interest rates beyond his control to be "the mother and father of all evil", stated that "the central bank can't take this independence and set aside the signals given by the president." Despite Erdoğan's apparent opposition, Turkey's Central Bank raised interest rates sharply.

As of 2020, the Turkish lira lowered in value, with the currency going through a process of depreciation, consistently reaching all-time lows. The Turkish lira depreciated by over 400% compared to the US dollar and the euro since 2008, largely due to Erdoğan's expansionist foreign policy. Erdoğan has tried to fix the financial crisis with unorthodox banking methods.

The Turkish lira partially recovered in early 2021 with the government's increase in interest rates. However, the currency began to crash due to inflation and depreciation starting on 21 March 2021, after the sacking of Central Bank chief Naci Ağbal. The Turkish lira reached a then-all-time-low of ₺8.8 to the dollar on 4 June. The Turkish lira became one of the quickest collapsing currencies of 2021. The Turkish lira reached a new low of ₺8.9 to the dollar in September 2021. In late 2021, the Turkish lira began collapsing rapidly, with the exchange rate falling 9% against the US dollar, reaching an all-time low of ₺12.5 to the dollar. The Turkish lira continued to collapse in December, with the inflation rate reaching unseen levels, collapsing to ₺14.5 to the US Dollar, losing nearly all of its original value. On 17 December, the lira fell by 8.5%, raising the exchange rate to ₺16.5 to the US dollar. Despite the currency collapse, Erdoğan lowered interest rates down to 14% from 15%, causing the lira to lose half of its value since the start of 2021. The Turkish Lira continued to decline throughout 2022. The central bank governor Şahap Kavcıoğlu lowered interest rates by 150 basis points, from 12% to 10.5%, down from the 2021 low of 15%. The official inflation rate of the Lira through 2022 reached 83%, but independent reviews of the Turkish lira put the inflation rate even higher.

In 2023, Erdoğan began to follow orthodox banking methods. Under the guidance of Mehmet Şimşek and Hafize Gaye Erkan, the central bank began to rapidly increase interest rates. By the end of the year, the interest rate stood at 42.5%, and the annual inflation rate decreased to 53.86%, down from 83% in 2022. The central bank increased the interest rate to 50% in March 2024 under Fatih Karahan, the new governor, and has kept it as such as for eight consecutive months. This has resulted in the lira gaining value since May, when inflation peaked at 75.45%, but has decreased to 47.09% in November. The Turkish Lira has regained some valuation. Following the arrest of the mayor of Istanbul, Ekrem Imamoglu, in March 2025, Marketwatch reported that the Turkish lira reached a record low. The Turkish Lira began depreciating rapidly in early 2026 compared to the Euro and USD.

By November 2026, the exchange rate had exceeded 50 lira per US dollar. Yet the currency's performance looked different when measured in real terms. The consumer price-based real effective exchange rate index rose by 8% in October compared with its 2025 average, reaching its highest level since January 2020. This relative appreciation has drawn criticism from exporters, who argue that it has made Turkish goods less competitive in international markets.

== Coins ==
From 1 January 2009, the prefix "new" was removed from the second Turkish lira, its official name in Turkey becoming "Turkish lira" again; new coins without the word "yeni" were introduced in denominations of 1kr., 5kr., 10kr., 25kr., 50kr. and ₺1. Also, the center and ring alloys of the 50kr. and ₺1 coins were reversed.

Current Turkish lira coins
Image		Value (kuruş)	Technical parameters				Description				Date of	
Obverse	Reverse	Value (kuruş)	Diameter (mm)	Thickness (mm)	Mass (g)	Composition	Edge	Obverse		Reverse	first minting	issue
		1kr.	16.5	1.35	2.2	70% Cu, 30% Zn	Plain	Value, Crescent-star, year of minting	Snowdrop	"TÜRKİYE CUMHURİYETİ", Mustafa Kemal Atatürk	2008	1 January 2009
		5kr.	17.5	1.65	2.9	65% Cu, 18% Ni, 17% Zn	Plain	Value, Crescent-star, year of minting	Tree of life	"TÜRKİYE CUMHURİYETİ", Mustafa Kemal Atatürk	2008	1 January 2009
		10kr.	18.5	1.65	3.15	65% Cu, 18% Ni, 17% Zn	Plain	Value, Crescent-star, year of minting	Rumi motif	"TÜRKİYE CUMHURİYETİ", Mustafa Kemal Atatürk	2008	1 January 2009
		25kr.	20.5	1.65	4	65% Cu, 18% Ni, 17% Zn	Reeded	Value, Crescent-star, year of minting	Kufic calligraphic	"TÜRKİYE CUMHURİYETİ", Mustafa Kemal Atatürk	2008	1 January 2009
		50kr.	23.85	1.9	6.8	Ring: 65% Cu, 18% Ni, 17% Zn; Center: 79% Cu, 17% Zn, 4% Ni	Large reeded	Value, Crescent-star, year of minting	Bosphorus Bridge and Istanbul silhouette	"TÜRKİYE CUMHURİYETİ", Mustafa Kemal Atatürk	2008	1 January 2009
		₺1	26.15	1.9	8.2	Ring: 79% Cu, 17% Zn, 4% Ni; Center: 65% Cu, 18% Ni, 17% Zn	inscribed, T.C. letters and tulip figure	Value, Crescent-star, year of minting	Rumi motif	"TÜRKİYE CUMHURİYETİ", Mustafa Kemal Atatürk	2008	1 January 2009
		₺5	28.15	1.9	8.25	Ring: 64% Cu, 32% Zn, 4% Ni; Center: 64% Cu, 27% Ni, 9% Zn	Large reeded	Value, Crescent-star, year of minting	Seljuk star, Centenary of the Turkish Republic logo	"TÜRKİYE CUMHURİYETİ", Mustafa Kemal Atatürk	2023	29 October 2023
These images are to scale at 2.5 pixels per millimetre. For table standards, see the coin specification table.

=== Circulating commemorative coins ===
Since 2012, the Turkish State Mint has introduced ten commemorative coins in circulation.

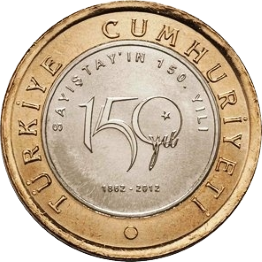
150th anniversary of Court of Accounts (2012)

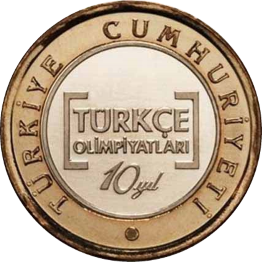
10th International Turkish Olympiad (2012)

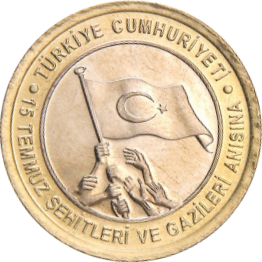
Commemorative coin for martyrs and veterans of July 15 (2016)

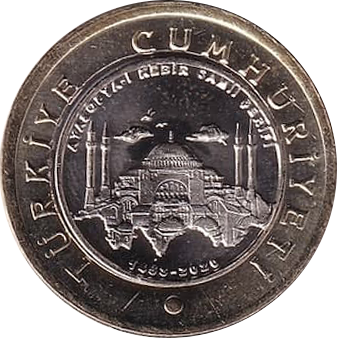
Commemoration of Hagia Sophia's reversion to mosque (2020)

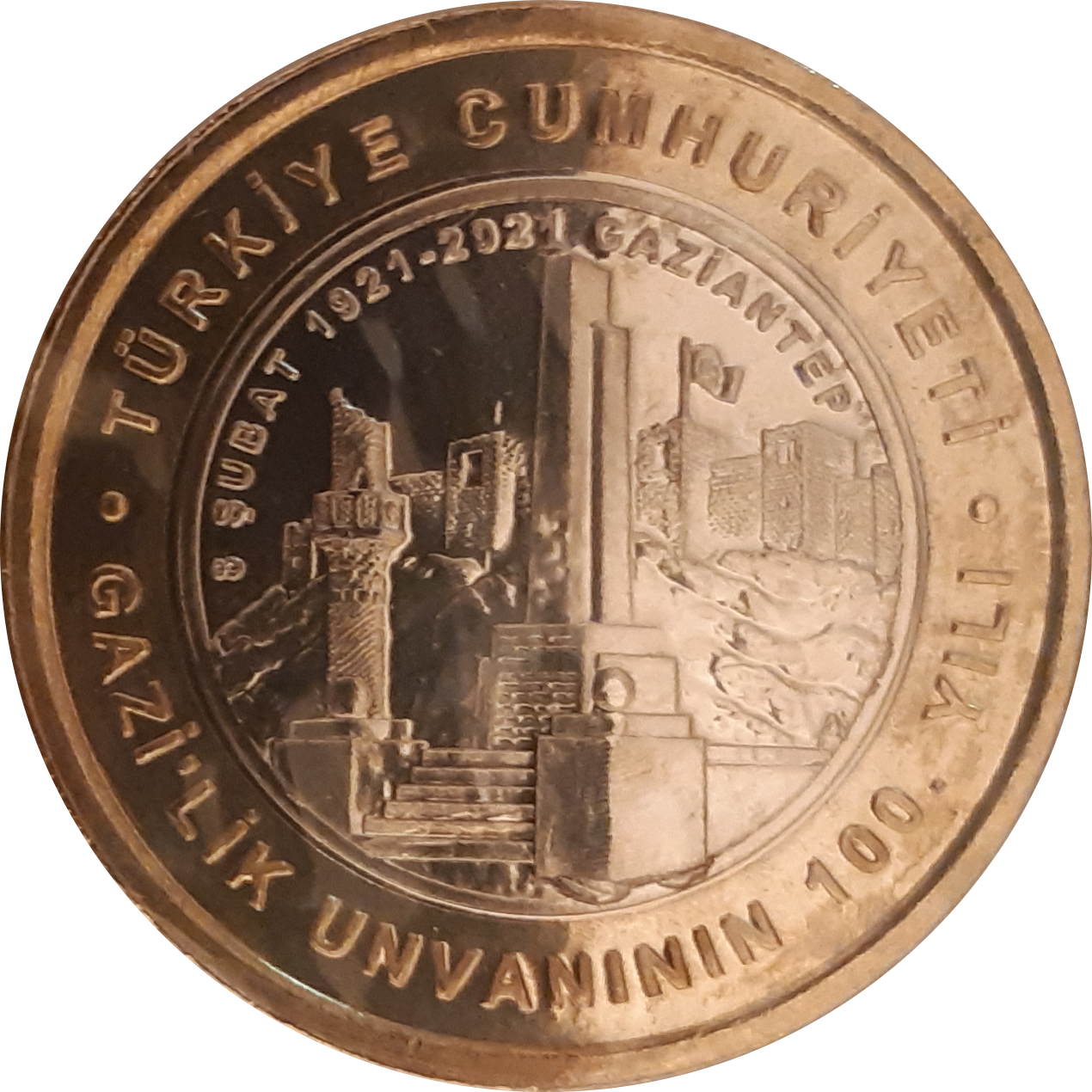
100th year of honoring Antep province with the ghazi title (2021)

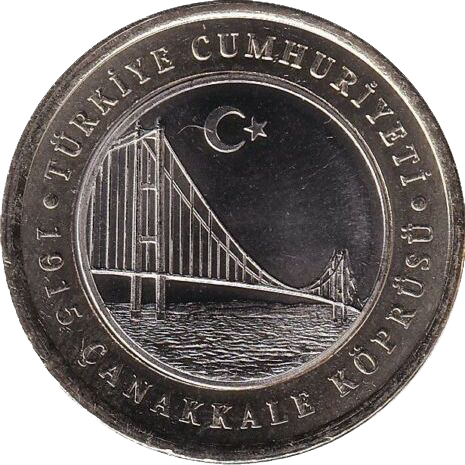
Commemoration of the opening ceremony of 1915 Çanakkale Bridge (2022)

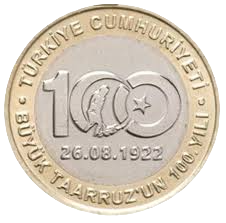
100th anniversary of the Great Offensive (2022)

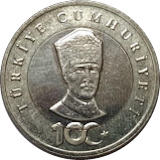
100th years of the republic (5 lira) (2023)
- 2018: Commemoration of inauguration ceremony of the President Recep Tayyip Erdoğan
- 2020: 100th anniversary of Grand National Assembly of Turkey
- 2023: Commemoration of inauguration ceremony of the President Recep Tayyip Erdoğan
- 2024: 50th anniversary of Cyprus Peace Operation
- 2026: Commemoration of the NATO summit (5 lira)
- 2026: 10th anniversary of the July 15 and Democracy and National Unity Day (5 lira)

== Banknotes ==
A new series of banknotes, the "E-9 Emission Group" entered circulation on 1 January 2009, with the E-8 group ceasing to be valid after 31 December 2009 (although still redeemable at branches of the Central Bank until 31 December 2019). The E-9 banknotes refer to the currency as "Turkish lira" rather than "new Turkish lira" and include a new ₺200 denomination. The new banknotes have different sizes to prevent forgery. The main specificity of this new series is that each denomination depicts a famous Turkish personality, rather than geographical sites and architectural features of Turkey. The dominant color of the 5-Turkish-lira banknote has been determined as "purple" on the second series of the current banknotes.

Current Turkish lira banknotes 9. Emission Group
Image		Value (₺)	Dimensions (mm)	Main Colour	Description			Date of issue
Obverse	Reverse	Value (₺)	Dimensions (mm)	Main Colour	Obverse	Reverse	Watermark	Date of issue
		5	130 × 64	Brown	Mustafa Kemal Atatürk	Aydın Sayılı: solar system, atom, left-handed Z-DNA helix.	Mustafa Kemal Atatürk, value	1 January 2009
		5	130 × 64	Purple	Mustafa Kemal Atatürk	Aydın Sayılı: solar system, atom, left-handed Z-DNA helix.	Mustafa Kemal Atatürk, value	8 April 2013
		10	136 × 64	Red	Mustafa Kemal Atatürk	Cahit Arf: Arf invariant, arithmetic series, abacus, binary sequence	Mustafa Kemal Atatürk, value	1 January 2009
		20	142 × 68	Green	Mustafa Kemal Atatürk	Mimar Kemaleddin: Gazi University main building, aqueduct, circular motif and cube-globe-cylinder symbolizing architecture	Mustafa Kemal Atatürk, value	1 January 2009
		50	148 × 68	Orange	Mustafa Kemal Atatürk	Fatma Aliye Topuz: flower and literary figures	Mustafa Kemal Atatürk, value	1 January 2009
		100	154 × 72	Blue	Mustafa Kemal Atatürk	Buhurizade Itri: musical notes, instruments and Mevlevi figure	Mustafa Kemal Atatürk, value	1 January 2009
		200	160 × 72	Pink	Mustafa Kemal Atatürk	Yunus Emre: Yunus's mausoleum, rose, pigeon and the line "Sevelim, sevilelim" (Let us love, let us be loved)	Mustafa Kemal Atatürk, value	1 January 2009
These images are to scale at 0.7 pixel per millimetre (18 pixel per inch). For table standards, see the banknote specification table.

== Currency sign ==
Turkish lira sign

Design limits

The lira was originally symbolised as TL, inverting the characters of the Ottoman lira's sign, LT, which stood for "Livre Turque" in French. Historically English language sources used "£T" or "T£" for the currency, but it is unknown whether this notation was ever used within Turkey.

The current currency sign of Turkish lira was created by the Central Bank of the Republic of Turkey in 2012. The new sign was selected after a country-wide contest. The new symbol is composed of the letter L shaped like a half anchor, and embedded double-striped letter T angled at 20 degrees.

The design, created by Tülay Lale, was endorsed after a country-wide competition. It was chosen as the winner from a shortlist of seven submissions to the board of the Central Bank, selected from a total of 8,362 entries. The symbol resembles the first letter of the Turkish monetary unit, L, in the form of a half anchor with double stroke.

Prime Minister Recep Tayyip Erdoğan announced the new symbol on 1 March 2012. At its unveiling, Erdoğan explained the design as "the anchor shape hopes to convey that the currency is a 'safe harbour' while the upward-facing lines represent its rising prestige".

Faik Öztrak, vice chairman of the main opposition party CHP, alleged that the new sign resembles the initials TE of then-prime minister Tayyip Erdoğan in a reference to the tughra of Ottoman sultans. The new Turkish lira sign was also criticized for allegedly showing a similarity with an upside-down Armenian dram sign.

In May 2012, the Unicode Technical Committee accepted the encoding of a new character U+20BA ₺ TURKISH LIRA SIGN for the currency sign, which was included in Unicode 6.2 released in September 2012. On Microsoft Windows operating systems, when using Turkish-Q or Turkish-F keyboard layouts, it can be typed with the combination AltGr+T.

== Circulation ==
Most traded currencies by value Currency distribution of global foreign exchange market turnover
Currency	ISO 4217 code	Proportion of daily volume		Change (2022–2025)
Currency	ISO 4217 code	April 2022	April 2025	Change (2022–2025)
United States dollar	USD	88.4%	89.2%	▲0.8pp
Euro	EUR	30.6%	28.9%	▼1.7pp
Japanese yen	JPY	16.7%	16.8%	▲0.1pp
Pound sterling	GBP	12.9%	10.2%	▼2.7pp
Renminbi	CNY	7.0%	8.5%	▲1.5pp
Swiss franc	CHF	5.2%	6.4%	▲1.2pp
Australian dollar	AUD	6.4%	6.1%	▼0.3pp
Canadian dollar	CAD	6.2%	5.8%	▼0.4pp
Hong Kong dollar	HKD	2.6%	3.8%	▲1.2pp
Singapore dollar	SGD	2.4%	2.4%	Steady
Indian rupee	INR	1.6%	1.9%	▲0.3pp
South Korean won	KRW	1.8%	1.8%	Steady
Swedish krona	SEK	2.2%	1.6%	▼0.6pp
Mexican peso	MXN	1.5%	1.6%	▲0.1pp
New Zealand dollar	NZD	1.7%	1.5%	▼0.2pp
Norwegian krone	NOK	1.7%	1.3%	▼0.4pp
New Taiwan dollar	TWD	1.1%	1.2%	▲0.1pp
Brazilian real	BRL	0.9%	0.9%	Steady
South African rand	ZAR	1.0%	0.8%	▼0.2pp
Polish złoty	PLN	0.7%	0.8%	▲0.1pp
Danish krone	DKK	0.7%	0.7%	Steady
Indonesian rupiah	IDR	0.4%	0.7%	▲0.3pp
Turkish lira	TRY	0.4%	0.5%	▲0.1pp
Thai baht	THB	0.4%	0.5%	▲0.1pp
Israeli new shekel	ILS	0.4%	0.4%	Steady
Hungarian forint	HUF	0.3%	0.4%	▲0.1pp
Czech koruna	CZK	0.4%	0.4%	Steady
Chilean peso	CLP	0.3%	0.3%	Steady
Philippine peso	PHP	0.2%	0.2%	Steady
Colombian peso	COP	0.2%	0.2%	Steady
Malaysian ringgit	MYR	0.2%	0.2%	Steady
UAE dirham	AED	0.4%	0.1%	▼0.3pp
Saudi riyal	SAR	0.2%	0.1%	▼0.1pp
Romanian leu	RON	0.1%	0.1%	Steady
Peruvian sol	PEN	0.1%	0.1%	Steady
Other currencies		2.6%	3.4%	▲0.8pp
Total (Note: The total sum is 200% because each currency trade is counted twice: once for the currency being bought and once for the currency being sold. The percentages above represent the proportion of all trades involving a given currency, regardless of which side of the transaction it is on.)		200.0%	200.0%	

== Current exchange rates ==
Current TRY exchange rates
From Google Finance:	AUD CAD CHF CNY EUR GBP HKD JPY USD AZN NZD RUB
From Yahoo! Finance:	AUD CAD CHF CNY EUR GBP HKD JPY USD AZN NZD RUB
From XE.com:	AUD CAD CHF CNY EUR GBP HKD JPY USD AZN NZD RUB
From OANDA:	AUD CAD CHF CNY EUR GBP HKD JPY USD AZN NZD RUB

== See also ==
- Banknotes of Turkey
- Coins of Turkey
- Economy of Turkey
- Economy of Northern Cyprus
- Ottoman lira
