= Edgar Manas =

Turkish composer (1875-1964)

Edgar Manas

Edgar Manas Effendi (Armenian: Էտկար Մանաս; April 12, 1875 – March 9, 1964 in Istanbul) was a Turkish composer, conductor and musicologist of Armenian descent. He is one of the three co-composers of the Turkish National Anthem, as he made the arrangements for orchestra.

== Family ==
Of Armenian descent, Edgar's father, Alexandre Manas, was the chief translator for the Ottoman Public Debt Administration. The family lineage may be traced back to Caesarea (now Kayseri), where it originated in the mid-sixteenth century. Raphael Manas (c.1710 - 1790), an official painter of the Ottoman Empire, was arguably the most outstanding figure of the Manas dynasty: he made the portraits of Mahmud I, Osman III and Mustafa III.

== Early life ==
Edgar Manas was born on April 12, 1875, in Istanbul. Artistically gifted young Edgar was sent to Italy at the age of 13 to attend the Moorat-Raphael College to study commerce. While in Venice he also took piano lessons with Professor Trivellini. Upon graduating in 1894, he returned to his native city. Yet, his impulse to continue his music studies took him back to Italy, where he settled in Padua and worked with composer Luigi Bottazzo, focusing on harmony, counterpoint and fugue.

== Professional career ==
Back in Istanbul, Manas pursued his music studies further. He concentrated primarily on composition by examining the classics and the works of contemporary French masters. He produced a series of piano composition in the idiom of Chopin, including "Minuet-Valse" which was published in 1905 by A. Comendinger of Istanbul. During the same year, Edgar Manas conducted the Gallia choral group in a concert at Salle de fêtes de l'Union française, a local auditorium, which earned him the order of Officier d’académie from the French government.

In 1912, Manas made the acquaintance of Komitas, the founder of modern Armenian music. Although their relationship was cordial, it was not particularly close, for Manas and Komitas lived in two different aesthetic worlds.

The same year, Leipzig-based Breitkopf & Härtel published two of Edgar Manas's compositions – Suite for piano and String Quartet. It was followed by other European publishing houses, including Salabert, Senard and Hamelle. Manas's music was performed often in Istanbul, and, on occasion, in European music capitals.

The String Quartet, mentioned above, was premiered in an all-Manas program on May 6, 1921, at Union française. Members of the quartet were violinists Ekrem Zeki Ün and Krikor Garabedian, violist Diran Israelian and cellist Kalayov. On this occasion, the composer performed his Piano Suite and accompanied soprano A. Khandjian in a number of songs. A few years later, the Quartet was performed in Leipzig with much success. Martin Friedland wrote the following in Neue Zeitschrift für Musik:

(This Quartet... derives from a Classic/neo-Romantic sensibility and conception. It begins with a Fughetta that is based upon a theme of rhythmic character and followed by a succinct, sturdy, staccato Scherzo with a cantabile Lento as Trio. A short Adagio spanned by long melodic arcs, titled "Lied," follows as the third movement; and a lively, vivacious, flowing Finale, full of inner life, brings this concise work to a close. Without exploring new harmonic or formal territory, it shows the hand of someone with the characteristic quartet style of familiar masters, who achieves excellent motivic work and finds pleasure in honest images and forms averse to any affectation. A piece as worthy of hearing as it is of playing.)

Manas was soon appointed to the directorship of the Lyre (Քնար ) chorus, associated with Armenian Youth League of Istanbul. Between the years 1920 – 22, he became affiliated with the Devotee of the Arts (Արուեստասէր) music organization, conducting their annual presentations. During the final concert on January 20, 1922, the program included Manas's own composition, My Death («Իմ մահը»), in addition to works from the standard repertoire.

Manas was engaged to teach music at the Esayan Armenian day school and was hired by the Dârülelhan (the precursor of the Istanbul State Conservatory) in 1923 to conduct the orchestra and establish the first women's choir in the newly founded Turkish Republic. Manas also taught harmony at the Bahariye Mektep Bandosu and Orkestrası (Bahariye School Band and Orchestra). The vocal-symphonic ensemble of the conservatory presented its first concert at the historic Galatasaray High School on March 28, 1924. The program included excerpts from Saint-Saëns's Samson et Dalila, Meyerbeer's L'Africaine, Brahms' Nänie, as well as purely orchestral works by Gluck, Schmitt, Schumann and Mendelssohn.

In 1923, Hamelle published a collection of songs by Manas, which were based on Armenian poetry but were presented in their French translation by Yetvart Kolandjian. In 1924, it was followed by the publication of his Sonata for violin and piano, premiered to critical acclaim on December 19, 1932, at the main auditorium of the Paris Conservatoire. Kevork Sinanian was the violinist and the composer was at the piano.

In February 1926, Salabert of Paris printed Manas's piano work, Les îles des princes (Princes' Islands). The composition consisted of four movements, each portraying one of the main islands of the archipelago in the Sea of Marmara. Manas soon made an orchestral version of the work.

Edgar Manas perhaps is best remembered for his work on İstiklal Marşı, the Turkish National Anthem. In 1932, he was commissioned by the Turkish Republic to harmonize and orchestrate the melody created by Zeki Üngör. In 1933, a choir of 160 members performed his Vatan Şarkısı (National Song) at the Tepebaşı Tiyatrosu in Istanbul. The following year, Manas arranged and published 5 Türk Halk Şarkısı (Five Turkish Folk Songs) and, in 1935, composed Danses populaires Turques (Turkish Folk Dances) for piano, published by Editions Maurice Senard in Paris.

Manas was appointed choirmaster of The Choir of Goghtn (Գողթան երգչախումբ) of the Armenian patriarchal church in Istanbul, where he served for twenty years until 1957. His Rapsodie de l'orient was performed by Istanbul Municipal Orchestra under the baton of Cemal Reşit Rey in 1959.

Edgar Manas has composed a sizable body of sacred music. The most significant among them is perhaps the Armenian Divine Liturgy for soloists, choir and organ. It was initially conceived in 1912, but was given its final form in 1948. The large scale composition was premiered in Istanbul in 1961 and published in Vienna in 1962. In the foreword of the printed score, the composer writes:

Compared to the Latin Mass, which consists of five movements of various lengths, the Armenian Divine Liturgy is made of several short segments that are interconnected. In order to avoid any kind of monotony and to conclude the work with a proper ending, I decided to augment certain numbers...and finish the composition with a chorale and fugue. This particular Divine Liturgy with organ obbligato, reserved for special occasions, requires a big chorus in order to project the necessary volume in loud portions, and create an even and opaque sonority in soft passages.

== Legacy ==
His students included members of the Ottoman Palace, Turkish musicians, such as Hüseyin Sadeddin Arel and Dr. Suphi Ezgi, and Armenian composers, including Ara Bartevian and Koharik Gazarossian. Edgar Manas is buried in the Pangaltı Catholic Cemetery of Şişli, Istanbul.

A large portion of Manas's manuscripts is reposited at the Charents Museum of Literature and Arts of Armenia.

== Compositions ==
=== Orchestral ===
- Symphony in G minor (1935)
- Symphonietta
- Les Îles des princes, suite
- Deux pièces
- Rapsodie de l'Orient

=== Sacred ===
- Oratorio, vv, chorus, orch. (Խորհուրդ խորին, Հրեշտակային, Ի բարութեանց, Յայս յարկ, Ամէն. եւ ընդ հոգւոյդ քում, Օրհնեցից զՏէր) (1912)
- Tantum Ergo (Latin text by St Thomas Aquinas), three-voice male chorus
- Հինգ հոգևոր երգ - Նշանաւ, Ի յամուլ երկրէ, Մայր լուսոյն, Տէր թագաւորեաց, Ով երանելիդ (Five Sacred Melodies), vv, chorus (arr. for pf)
- Երգեցողութիւն Ս. Պատարագի (Armenian Divine Liturgy), vv, chorus, org. (1962)

=== Secular Choral ===
- Աղբիւրին առջև (By the Fountainhead / text by Kurken Trentz), male chorus
- Աշնանային (Autumnal / text unknown), chorus, pf (arr. a cappella)
- Որսկան աղբէր, Գութանի երգը (Plow Song / text by Hovhannes Tumanyan), chorus (1939)
- Իմ մահը (My Death / text by Bedros Tourian), chorus
- Le livre de la vie (text by Alphonse de Lamartine), two-voice chorus
- Լոյսդ տեսայ (I Witnessed Your Light / text by Toros Azadyan), male chorus
- Ծաղիկ մ՚է սիրտն (The heart Is a Flower / text by Toros Azadyan), male chorus
- Հինգ խմբերգ - Վարդերգ, Գարուններ, Գարնան անձրև, Կեանքը, Բաղձանք (Five choral pieces / text by Kurken Trentz) Chorus, pf (arr. chorus, orch)
- Altın Yüzük, Havuz Başı (Golden Ring, By the Fountain), chorus, pf (arr.)
- İndim Dere Beklerim, Şahin (Waiting by the River, Eagle), chorus, pf (arr.)

=== Stage ===
- Ձիւնափայլին վախճանը (Children's operetta)

=== Songs with piano ===
- Անցեալին (In the Past / text by Toros Azadyan)
- Դարդըս լացէք (Feel My Pain / text by Avetik Isahakyan - 1947)
- Երեք երգեր - Հրաւէր, Գիշերային, Գարնանային (Three Songs / text by Toros Azadyan)
- Ըղձանք (Desire / text by Kurken Trentz)
- 5 Türk Halk Şarkısı - Ahmet, Kara tavuk, Aşkın, Yalı havası, Dama çıkma (Five Turkish Folk Songs - 1934)
- Հին մեղեդին, Երգ (Ancient Melody, Song / text by Malvine Valideyan)
- Preghiera dell'alba (Prayer at Dawn / text A. Negri)
- Սիրերգ (Love song / text by Misak Medzarents)
- Vocalise for 3 voices
- Հծծիւններ (Whispers / text Kurken Trentz - 1963)
- Pepo (from the movie score by Aram Khachaturian), (arr.)

=== Chamber music ===
- Piano Quintet
- String Quartet
- Sonata for vn and pf (1923)

=== Piano ===
- Impromptu
- Minuet-Valse (1905)
- Suite (Romance en forme de valse, Chanson paysanne, Mazurka - 1912)
- Deux Préludes et fugues, C, f
- Les îles des princes
- Petite suite (Bourrée, Aria, Toccata)
- Danses populaires turques (Oyun havası, Divan, Zeybek oyun havası, Ağır zeybek oyunu, Gelin havası, Ağır zeybek oyun havası, Zeybek oyun havası - 1929)
- Allegro symphonique, 4 hands (1908)
- Petite pièce, 4 hands
- Melodie populaire, 4 hands
