= İstiklal Marşı =

National anthem of Turkey and Northern Cyprus

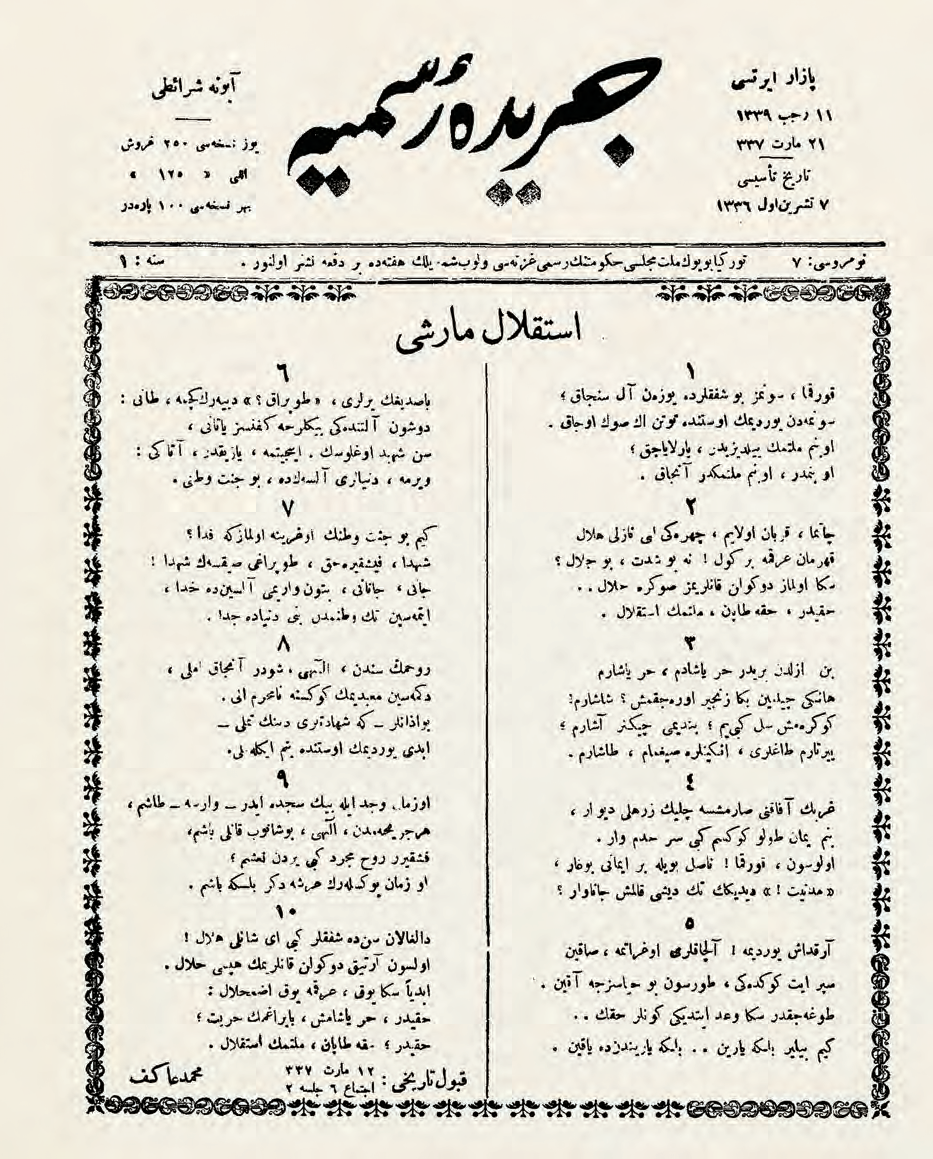
- Dated copy of the original text that was released on 21 March 1921
- National anthem of Turkey and Northern Cyprus
- Lyrics: Mehmet Akif Ersoy, 1921
- Music: Osman Zeki Üngör (composer); Edgar Manas (orchestration)
- Adopted: 1921 (by Turkey); 1938 (by Hatay State); 1983 (by Northern Cyprus)
- Preceded by: Mahmudiye March (last anthem of the Ottoman Empire)

Audio sample
- 2013 official orchestral and choral vocal recording (first and second verse) in G minor: file; help

2013 official orchestral and choral vocal recording, alternate version in E minor.

"İstiklal Marşı" (Turkish: [isticˈlal maɾˈʃɯ]; lit. 'Independence March') is the national anthem of both the Republic of Turkey and the Turkish Republic of Northern Cyprus. It was officially adopted by the Grand National Assembly on 12 March 1921 – 2½ years before the 29 October 1923 establishment of the nation – both as a motivational musical saga for the troops fighting in the Turkish War of Independence, and as an aspirational anthem for a Republic that was yet to be established.

Penned by Mehmet Âkif Ersoy, and ultimately composed by Osman Zeki Üngör, the theme is one of affection for the Turkish homeland, freedom, and faith, as well as praise for the virtues of hope, devotion, and sacrifice in the pursuit of liberty, all explored through visual, tactile, and kinesthetic imagery as these concepts relate to the flag, the human spirit, and the soil of the homeland. The original manuscript by Ersoy carries the dedication Kahraman Ordumuza ('To Our Heroic Army'), in reference to the national forces that ultimately won the Turkish War of Independence, with lyrics that reflect on the sacrifices of the soldiers during the war.

It is regularly heard during state and military events, as well as during national festivals, bayrams, sporting events, and school ceremonies. Visual depictions can also be found adorning state or public displays, such as in the form of a scroll displaying the first two quatrains of the anthem on the reverse of the Turkish 100 lira banknotes of 1983–1989.

Of the ten-stanza anthem, only the first two quatrains are sung.

A framed version of the national anthem typically occupies the wall above the blackboard in the classrooms of Turkish schools, accompanied by a Turkish flag, a photograph of the country's founder Atatürk, and a copy of Atatürk's speech to the nation's youth from the concluding remarks to his 20 October 1927 address to the Parliament.

In 1983, the Turkish Republic of Northern Cyprus also adopted the Turkish national anthem under Article II of the Constitution of Northern Cyprus.

== History ==
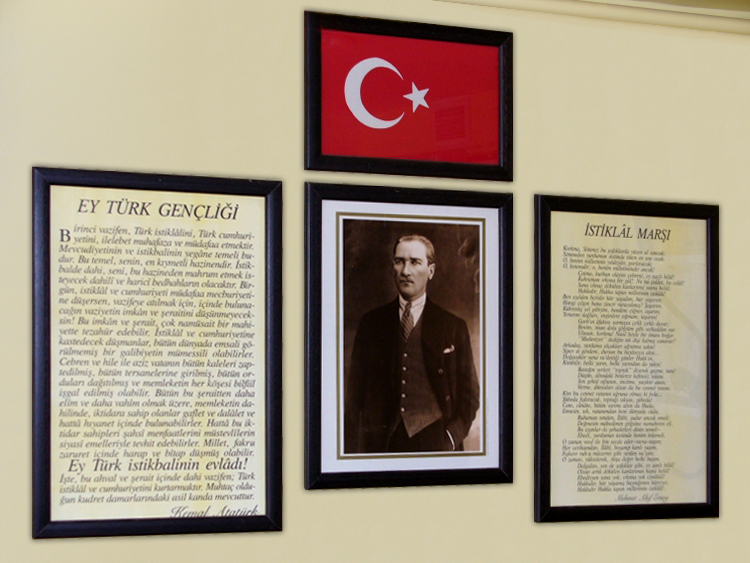
An example of a common classroom display in Turkey, including the national anthem at far right

1927 band and male vocal recording (first and last verses) (1924–1930 music)
Performance of the first and last verses of the anthem with the music by Ali Rıfat Çağatay, used from 1924 to 1930

The present-day anthem is a collective effort by several prominent poets, musicians, and composers that took form over several years due to the relatively tumultuous nature of the period in which it was crafted.

Even before the full official dissolution of the Ottoman Empire, a nationwide competition was organized in 1921 by the Turkish National Movement, an independent and self-organized militia force led by Mustafa Kemal Atatürk waging a lengthy campaign for independence against both invading foreign powers and the Ottoman Court itself while deeming the latter treasonous for its complicity in the partition of the Turkish homeland in the aftermath of the 1920 Treaty of Sèvres. The goal of the competition was to select an original composition suitable for a National March, intended to both motivate the militia forces fighting for independence across the country, and to provide inspiration and pride for a new homeland that would be established once victory was achieved.

A total of 724 poems were submitted. Mehmet Akif Ersoy, a well-known poet of the period, initially refused to participate due to a monetary prize being offered in the competition, but was subsequently contacted and convinced by the National Parliament to submit a poem and disregard the reward. The resulting ten-stanza-long poem written by Ersoy was recited to the National Assembly by representative Hamdullah Suphi, on 1 March 1921, where it was unanimously adopted by the deputies following evaluation by a parliamentary committee. The prize of the competition was later bestowed on a society of veterans.

This early composition by Çağatay lasted only six years. In 1930, a new composition by Osman Zeki Üngör, virtuoso composer and the first conductor of the Presidential Symphony Orchestra of the Republic of Turkey, was adopted as a permanent musical arrangement by Parliament. Shortly thereafter, in 1932, the musician Edgar Manas was commissioned by the Turkish government to harmonize and orchestrate the melody created by Üngör, and the final and official version of the anthem took form.

== Lyrics ==
U.S. Navy Band instrumental version (two verses) in G minor

The full lyrics of the Turkish national anthem consist of 41 lines of verses, with ten stanzas total, though only the first two verses (shown in bold) are performed in official ceremonies.

Modern Turkish

**Korkma! Sönmez bu şafaklarda yüzen al sancak,**
**Sönmeden yurdumun üstünde tüten en son ocak.**
**O benim milletimin yıldızıdır, parlayacak;**
**O benimdir, o benim milletimindir ancak.**

**Çatma, kurban olayım, çehreni ey nazlı hilal!**
**Kahraman ırkıma bir gül; ne bu şiddet, bu celal?**
**Sana olmaz dökülen kanlarımız sonra helal...**
**Hakkıdır, Hakk’a tapan milletimin istiklal!**

Ben ezelden beridir hür yaşadım, hür yaşarım,
Hangi çılgın bana zincir vuracakmış? Şaşarım!
Kükremiş sel gibiyim, bendimi çiğner, aşarım,
Yırtarım dağları, enginlere sığmam, taşarım.

Garbın afakını sarmışsa çelik zırhlı duvar,
Benim iman dolu göğsüm gibi serhaddim var.
Ulusun, korkma! Nasıl böyle bir imanı boğar,
“Medeniyet” dediğin tek dişi kalmış canavar?

Arkadaş! Yurduma alçakları uğratma sakın,
Siper et gövdeni, dursun bu hayâsızca akın.
Doğacaktır sana vadettiği günler Hakk’ın,
Kim bilir, belki yarın belki yarından da yakın.

Bastığın yerleri “toprak” diyerek geçme, tanı,
Düşün altındaki binlerce kefensiz yatanı.
Sen şehit oğlusun, incitme, yazıktır atanı,
Verme, dünyaları alsan da bu cennet vatanı.

Kim bu cennet vatanın uğruna olmaz ki feda?
Şüheda fışkıracak, toprağı sıksan şüheda!
Canı, cananı, bütün varımı alsın da Hüda,
Etmesin tek vatanımdan beni dünyada cüda.

Ruhumun senden İlahî, şudur ancak emeli:
Değmesin mabedimin göğsüne namahrem eli.
Bu ezanlar, ki şehadetleri dinin temeli,
Ebedî, yurdumun üstünde benim inlemeli.

O zaman vecd ile bin secde eder, varsa taşım,
Her cerihamdan, İlahî, boşanıp kanlı yaşım,
Fışkırır ruhumücerret gibi yerden naaşım,
O zaman yükselerek arşa değer belki başım.

Dalgalan sen de şafaklar gibi ey şanlı hilal!
Olsun artık dökülen kanlarımın hepsi helal.
Ebediyen sana yok, ırkıma yok izmihlal.
Hakkıdır, hür yaşamış bayrağımın hürriyet;
Hakkıdır, Hakk’a tapan milletimin istiklal!

Ottoman Turkish

**قورقمه، سونمز بو شفقلرده یوزن آل سانجاق**
**سونمدن یوردمڭ اوستنده توتن اڭ صوڭ اوجاق.**
**او بنم ملتمڭ یلدزدر پارلایاجاق؛**
**او بنمدر. او بنم ملتمڭدر آنجاق.**

**چاتمه قربان اولایم چهرڭی، ای نازلی هلال!**
**قهرمان عرقمه بر گل، نه بو شدت، بو جلال**
**ساڭا اولماز دوكولن قانلریمز صوڭرا حلال؛**
**حقدر، حقه طاپان ملتمڭ، استقلال!**

بن ازلدن بریدر حر یاشادم، حر یاشارم.
هانگی چیلغین بڭا زنجیر اوره‌جقمش، شاشارم!
كوكره‌مش سیل گبی‌یم، بندیمی چیكنه‌ر آشارم؛
ییرتارم داغلری، انگینلره صیغمام، طاشارم.

غربڭ آفاقنی صارمشسه چلیك زرهلی دیوار
بنم ایمان دولو گوكوسم گبی سرحدم وار.
اولوسن، قورقما، ناصل بویله بر ایمانی بوغار،
"مدنیت" دیدیگڭ تك دیشی قالمش جانوار؟

آرقاداش! یوردیمه آلچاقلری اوغراتما، صاقین
سپر ایت گوگده‌ڭی، طورسون بو حیاسزجه آقین؛
طوغه‌اجقدر سڭا وعد ایتدیكی گونلر حقڭ؛
كیم بیلیر بلكه یارین، بلكه یاریندن ده یاقین

باصدیغڭ یرلری "طوپراق!" دییه‌رك گچمه طانی
دوشون آلتنده‌كی بیڭلرجه كفنسز یاتانی!
سن شهید اوغلیسڭ، اینجیتمه یازیقدر آتاڭی
ویرمه، دنیالری آلسه‌ڭ ده بو جنت وطنی.

كیم بو جنت وطنڭ اوغرینه اولماز كه فدا،
شهدا فیشقیراجق طوپراغی صیقسه‌ڭ، شهدا!
جانی، جانانی، بوتون واریمی آلسین ده خدا
ایتمه‌سین تك وطنمدن بنی دنیاده جدا.

روحمڭ سندن، الهی، شودر آنجاق املی:
ده‌گمه‌سین معبدمڭ گوكسنه نامحرم الی.
بو اذانلر – كه شهادتلری دینڭ تملی –
ابدی، یوردیمڭ اوستنده بنم ایڭله‌مه‌لی.

او زمان وجد ایله بیڭ سجده ایده‌ر – وارسه – طاشم.
هر جریحه‌مدن، الهی، بوشانوب قانلی یاشم،
فیشقیریر روح مجرد گبی یردن نعشم؛
او زمان یوكسه‌له‌ره‌ڭ عرشه دگه‌ر بلكه باشم!

دالغالان سن ده شفقلر گبی ای شانلی هلال!
اولسڭ آرتق دكولن قانلریمڭ هپسی حلال!
ابدیا سڭا یوق، عرقمه یوق اضمحلال!
حقیدر حر یاشامش بایراغمڭ حریت؛
حقیدر حقه طاپان ملتمڭ استقلال!

IPA transcription (Note: See Help:IPA/Turkish and Turkish phonology.)

[ˈkʰo̞ɾk.mä s̪ø̞n̪ˈmæz̪ bu ʃä.fäk.ɫ̪äɾˈd̪ä jyˈz̪æn̪ äɫ̪ s̪än̪ˈdʒäk |]
[ˈs̪ø̞n̪.me̞.d̪æn̪ juɾ.d̪uˈmʊn̪ ys̪.t̪ʰyn̪ˈd̪e̞ t̪ʰyˈt̪ʰæn̪ ˈe̞n̪ s̪o̞n̪ o̞ˈdʒäk ‖]
[o̞ be̞ˈn̪ɪm mil̠.l̠e̞.t̪ʰiˈmɪn̪ jɯɫ̪.d̪ɯˈz̪ɯ.d̪ɯɾ̞̊ pʰäɾ.ɫ̪ä.jäˈdʒäk |]
[o̞ be̞ˈn̪im.d̪ɪɾ̞̊ o̞ be̞ˈn̪ɪm mil̠.l̠e̞.t̪ʰiˈmin̪.d̪ɪɾ̞̊ än̪ˈdʒäk ‖]

[ˈtʃät̪.mä kʰuɾˈbän̪ o̞.ɫ̪äˈjɯm | tʃe̞h.ɾe̞ˈn̪ɪ e̞j n̪äz̪ˈɫ̪ɯ hiˈɫ̪äɫ̪ |]
[kʰäh.ɾäˈmän̪ ɯɾ̞̊ˈkʰɯ.mä biɾ̞̊ ɟyl̠ n̪e̞ bu ʃid̪ˈd̪e̞t̪ bu dʒe̞ˈɫ̪äɫ̪ ‖]
[s̪äˈn̪ä o̞ɫ̪ˈmäz̪ d̪ø̞.cʰyˈl̠æn̪ kʰän̪.ɫ̪ä.ɾɯˈmɯz̪ ˈs̪o̞n̪.ɾä he̞ˈɫ̪äɫ̪ |]
[häkˈkʰɯ.d̪ɯɾ̞̊ häkˈkʰä t̪ʰäˈpʰän̪ mil̠.l̠e̞.t̪ʰiˈmɪn̪ is̪.t̪ʰicˈɫ̪äɫ̪ ‖]

[bæn̪ e̞.z̪æl̪ˈd̪æn̪ be̞ˈɾi.dɪɾ̞̊ hyɾ̞̊ jä.ʃäˈd̪ɯm hyɾ̞̊ jä.ʃäˈɾɯm |]
[ˈhäɲ.ɟɪ tʃɯɫ̪ˈgɯn̪ bäˈn̪ä z̪in̪ˈdʒɪɾ̞̊ βu.ɾä.dʒäkˈmɯʃ ʃäˈʃä.ɾɯm ‖]
[cʰyc.ɾe̞ˈmɪʃ s̪æl̠ ɟi.biˈjɪm ˈbæn̪.d̪i.mɪ tʃiːˈn̪æɾ ä.ʃäˈɾɯm |]
[jɯɾˈt̪ʰä.ɾɯm d̪äː.ɫ̪äˈɾɯ e̞ɲ.ɟin̪.l̠e̞ˈɾe̞ s̪ɯːˈmäm t̪ʰäˈʃä.ɾɯm ‖]

[gäɾˈbɯn̪ äː.fäː.kʰɯˈn̪ɯ s̪äɾˈmɯʃ.s̪ä tʃe̞ˈl̠ɪc z̪ɯɾ̞̊ˈɫ̪ɯ d̪uˈväɾ̞̊ |]
[be̞ˈn̪ɪm iːˈmän̪ d̪o̞ˈɫ̪ʊ gø̞ːˈs̪ʏm ɟiˈbɪ s̪æɾ̞̊.häd̪ˈd̪ɪm väɾ̞̊ ‖]
[u.ɫ̪uˈs̪ʊn̪ ˈkʰo̞ɾk.mä ˈn̪ä.s̪ɯɫ̪ ˈbø̞j.l̠e biɾ iː.mäˈn̪ɯ bo̞ˈäɾ̞̊ |]
[me̞.d̪e̞.niˈje̞t̪ d̪e̞.d̪iˈɪn̪ t̪ʰe̞c d̪iˈʃɪ kʰäɫ̪ˈmɯʃ dʒä.n̪äˈväɾ̞̊ ‖]

[äɾ̞̊.kʰäˈd̪äʃ juɾˈd̪u.mä äɫ̪.tʃäk.ɫ̪äˈɾɯ uːˈɾät̪.mä s̪äˈkʰɯn̪ |]
[s̪iˈpʰæɾ æt̪ gø̞β.d̪e̞ˈn̪ɪ d̪uɾ̞̊ˈs̪ʊn̪ bu hä.jäːˈs̪ɯz̪.dʒä äˈkʰɯn̪ ‖]
[d̪o̞.äˈdʒäk.t̪ʰɯɾ̞̊ s̪äˈn̪ä vä.d̪e̞t̪.t̪ʰiˈɪ ɟyn̪ˈl̠æɾ̞̊ häkˈkʰɯn̪ |]
[cʰim biˈl̠ɪɾ̞̊ ˈbæl̠.cʰɪ jäˈɾɯn̪ ˈbæl̠.cʰɪ jä.ɾɯn̪ˈd̪än̪ d̪ä jäˈkʰɯn̪ ‖]

[bäs̪.t̪ʰɯˈɯn̪ jæɾ.l̠e̞ˈɾɪ t̪ʰo̞pˈɾäk d̪i.je̞ˈɾe̞c ˈɟe̞tʃ.me̞ t̪ʰäˈn̪ɯ |]
[d̪yˈʃʏn̪ äɫ̪.t̪ʰɯn̪ˈd̪ä.cʰɪ bin̪ˈl̠æɾ.dʒe̞ cʰe̞.fæn̪ˈs̪ɪz̪ jä.t̪ʰäˈn̪ɯ ‖]
[s̪æn̪ ʃe̞ˈhɪt̪ o̞ː.ɫ̪uˈs̪ʊn̪ in̪ˈdʒit̪.me̞ jäˈz̪ɯk.tʰɯɾ ä.t̪ʰäˈn̪ɯ |]
[ˈvæɾ.me̞ d̪yn.jä.ɫ̪äˈɾɯ äɫ̪ˈs̪än̪ d̪ä bu dʒe̞n̪ˈn̪e̞t̪ vä.t̪ʰäˈnɯ ‖]

[cʰim bu dʒe̞n̪ˈn̪e̞t̪ vä.t̪ʰäˈn̪ɯn̪ uː.ɾuˈn̪ä o̞ɫ̪ˈmäz̪ cʰi fe̞ˈd̪ä |]
[ʃy.he̞ˈd̪ä fɯʃ.kʰɯ.ɾäˈdʒäk t̪ʰo̞p.ɾäˈɯ s̪ɯkˈs̪än̪ ʃy.he̞ˈd̪ä ‖]
[dʒäːˈnɯ dʒäː.n̪äːˈn̪ɯ byˈt̪ʰʏn̪ vä.ɾɯˈmɯ äɫ̪ˈs̪ɯn̪ d̪ä hyˈd̪ä |]
[ˈe̞t̪.me̞.s̪ɪn̪ t̪ʰe̞c vä.t̪ʰä.n̪ɯmˈd̪än̪ be̞ˈn̪ɪ d̪yn̪.jäˈd̪ä dʒyˈd̪ä ‖]

[ɾ̞u.huˈmʊn̪ s̪æn̪ˈd̪æn̪ i.läːˈhiː ˈʃu.d̪ʊɾ än̪ˈdʒäk e̞.me̞ˈl̠ɪ |]
[ˈd̪e̞(j).e̞.me̞.s̪ɪn̪ mä.be̞.d̪iˈmɪn̪ gø̞ː.s̪yˈn̪e̞ n̪äː.mähˈɾe̞m e̞ˈl̠ɪ ‖]
[bu e̞.z̪än̪ˈɫ̪äɾ̞̊ cʰi ʃe̞.hä.d̪e̞t̪.l̠e̞ˈɾɪ d̪iˈn̪ɪn̪ t̪ʰe̞.me̞ˈl̠ɪ |]
[e̞.be̞ˈd̪iː juɾ.d̪uˈmʊn̪ ys̪.t̪ʰyn̪ˈd̪e̞ be̞ˈn̪ɪm in̪.l̠e̞.me̞ˈl̠ɪ ‖]

[o̞ z̪äˈmän̪ ve̞dʒd iˈl̠e̞ bin̪ s̪e̞dʒˈd̪e̞ e̞ˈd̪æɾ̞̊ ˈväɾ.s̪ä t̪ʰäˈʃɯm |]
[hæɾ̞̊ dʒe̞.ɾiː.hämˈd̪än̪ i.läːˈhiː bo̞.ʃäˈn̪ɯp kʰän̪ˈɫ̪ɯ jäˈʃɯm ‖]
[fɯʃ.kʰɯˈɾɯɾ̞ ɾ̞u.hu.my.dʒe̞ɾ̞ˈɾ̞e̞t̪ ɟiˈbɪ jæɾˈd̪æn̪ nä.äˈʃɯm |]
[o̞ z̪äˈmän̪ jyc.s̪e̞ˈl̠e̞.ɾe̞c äɾ̞̊ˈʃä d̪æˈæɾ̞̊ ˈbæl̠.cʰɪ bäˈʃɯm ‖]

[d̪äɫ̪.gäˈɫ̪än̪ s̪æn̪ d̪e ʃä.fäkˈɫ̪äɾ̞̊ ɟiˈbɪ e̞j ʃän̪ˈɫ̪ɯ hiˈɫ̪äɫ̪ ‖]
[o̞ɫ̪ˈs̪ʊn̪ äɾ̞̊ˈt̪ʰɯk dø̞.cʰyˈl̠æn̪ kʰän̪.ɫ̪ä.ɾɯˈmɯn̪ ˈhe̞p.s̪ɪ he̞ˈɫ̪äɫ̪ |]
[e̞.be̞ˈd̪i.jæn̪ s̪äˈn̪ä jo̞k ɯɾ̞̊ˈkʰɯ.mä jo̞k iz̪.mihˈɫ̪äɫ̪ ‖]
[häkˈkʰɯ.d̪ɯɾ̞̊ hyɾ̞̊ jäˈʃä.mɯʃ bäj.ɾä.ɯˈmɯn̪ hyɾ̞.ɾ̞iˈje̞t̪ |]
[häkˈkʰɯ.d̪ɯɾ̞̊ häkˈkʰä t̪ʰäˈpʰän̪ mil̠.l̠e̞.t̪ʰiˈmin̪ is̪.t̪ʰicˈɫ̪äɫ̪ ‖]

English translation

Fear not! For the red flag that proudly ripples in this glorious twilight, shall never fade,
Before the last fiery hearth that is ablaze within my nation is extinguished.
For That is the star of my nation, and it will forever shine;
It is mine; and solely belongs to my valiant nation.

Frown not, I beseech you, oh thou coy crescent,
But smile upon my heroic race! Why the anger, why the rage?
Our blood which we shed for you will not be blessed otherwise;
For freedom is the absolute right of my God-worshiping nation.

I have been free since the beginning and forever will be so.
What madman shall put me in chains! I defy the very idea!
I'm like the roaring flood; powerful and independent,
I'll tear apart mountains, exceed the heavens and still gush out!

The lands of the West may be armored with walls of steel,
But I have borders guarded by the mighty chest of a believer.
Recognize your innate strength, my friend! And think: how can this fiery faith ever be killed,
By that battered, single-fanged monster you call "civilization"?

My friend! Leave not my homeland to the hands of villainous men!
Render your chest as armor and your body as trench! Stop this disgraceful rush!
For soon shall come the joyous days of divine promise…
Who knows? Perhaps tomorrow? Perhaps even sooner!

View not the soil you tread on as mere earth, recognize it!
And think about the shroudless thousands who lie so nobly beneath you.
You're the noble son of a martyr, take shame, hurt not your ancestor!
Unhand not, even when you're promised worlds, this paradise of a homeland.

What man would not die for this heavenly piece of land?
Martyrs would gush out were one to just squeeze the soil! Martyrs!
May God take all my loved ones and possessions from me if He will,
But may He not deprive me of my one true homeland for the world.

Oh glorious God, the sole wish of my pain-stricken heart is that,
No heathen's hand should ever touch the bosom of my sacred Temples.
These adhans, whose shahadahs are the foundations of my religion,
And may their noble sound last loud and wide over my eternal homeland.

For only then, shall my fatigued tombstone, if there is one, prostrate a thousand times in ecstasy,
And tears of fiery blood shall flow out of my every wound,
And my lifeless body shall gush out from the earth like an eternal spirit,
Perhaps only then, shall I peacefully ascend and at long last reach the heavens.

So flap and wave like the bright dawning sky, oh thou glorious crescent,
So that our every last drop of blood may finally be worthy!
Neither you nor my race shall ever be extinguished!
For freedom is the absolute right of my ever-free flag;
For freedom is the absolute right of my God-worshiping nation!
