= Osman Zeki Üngör =

Turkish composer, violin virtuoso and lyricist

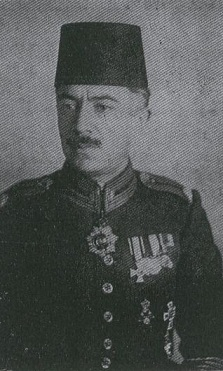
- Osman Zeki Bey during World War I
- Born: 1880; Istanbul, Ottoman Empire
- Died: 28 February 1958 (aged 77–78); Istanbul, Turkey
- Occupation: Composer
- Notable work: Composing the music of the Turkish National Anthem

Osman Zeki Üngör (pronounced [osˈman zeˈci ynˈɟœɾ]; 1880 – 28 February 1958) was a Turkish composer, violin virtuoso and lyricist, who served as the first conductor of the Presidential Symphony Orchestra of Turkey.

Üngör helped establish the State Conservatory of Turkey and served as its first headmaster, involving himself actively in the creation of laws whereby the education of students with special artistic talent would be wholly sponsored by the government.

Notable works include the symphonic arrangement of the original 1921 score for the Turkish National Anthem, İlim Marşı, Azm-ü Ümit Marşı, Töre Marşı, Türk Çocukları, and Cumhuriyet Marşı.

== Biography ==
Üngör was born in Üsküdar, Istanbul in 1880 as the son of a sugar merchant and the grandson of Santuri Hilmi Bey who himself is a musician in the Ottoman Imperial Court and the founder of the Fasl-ı Cedid body of the Muzika-i Hümayun ("The New Fasıl Division" of the Ottoman Imperial Orchestra).

After completing his education at the middle school of the Beşiktaş Military Academy, he was admitted into the Musical Academy of the Ottoman Imperial Orchestra in 1891 at the age of 11, where he garnered the attention of his instructors as well as that of Sultan Abdul Hamid II with his talent, who soon placed him under the instruction of Chief Violinist Vondra Bey and d’Aradna Pasha. Formally becoming a concert violinist following the completion of his musical education, Üngör continued to ascend the ranks of the Ottoman Imperial Orchestra, soon becoming first violinist, and ultimately, conductor in 1917.

He was a driving force in transforming the Muzika-i Hümayun from an orchestra that primarily performed military marches into a symphonic orchestra in the true Western sense.

Üngör complemented his orchestra duties with musical instruction, offering music classes at the Imperial Orchestra and the Istanbul Erkek Lisesi, as well as offering weekly public concerts at the Union Française. He additionally conducted performance in Vienna, Berlin, Dresden, Munich, Budapest and Sofia.

Üngör wrote symphonic arrangement for the Turkish National Anthem in 1922, composed to the lyrics written by the poet Mehmet Akif Ersoy. He subsequently became the first conductor of the newly established Presidential Symphony Orchestra of the Republic of Turkey, relocating to Ankara around 1924 in the process.

He was a key figure in the establishment of the Musik-i Muallim Cemiyeti, currently the State Conservatory at Hacettepe University, and served as its headmaster between the years 1924-1934. During this time, he was actively involved in the creation of laws regarding the government sponsorship and training abroad of especially talented young artists.

Following his retirement in 1934, Üngör spent his remaining days in his home at the Maçka Palas in Istanbul, dying on February 28, 1958, at the age of 78. His last wish of having the Istiklal Marsi performed at his ceremony was honored by the Government, making him the second person in the history of the Republic after Ersoy to have the national anthem performed at his funeral. His current resting place is at the Karacaahmet Cemetery in Üsküdar, Istanbul.

He had one son, Ekrem Zeki, who followed in Üngör’s footsteps to become a violinist and music instructor.

== See also ==
- İstiklâl Marşı
- Mehmet Akif Ersoy
