= 102.5 FM =

FM radio frequency

The following radio stations broadcast on FM frequency 102.5 MHz:

== Argentina ==
- 2001 in Punta Alta, Buenos Aires
- Cero in Deán Funes, Córdoba
- Continental Santa Fe in Santa Fe de la Vera Cruz, Santa Fe
- Dimensión in Coronel Bogado, Santa Fe
- Estación in San Francisco, Córdoba
- Flash in Córdoba
- Hot in Rosario, Santa Fe
- Huellas in El Chaltén, Santa Cruz
- IDEC in Rosario, Santa Fe
- La Colectiva in Buenos Aires
- La fortuna in Granadero Baigorria, Santa Fe
- La Retro in Rojas, Buenos Aires
- LRP736 Gigante in Avellaneda, Santa Fe
- LRI758 Vital in Villa Cañás, Santa Fe
- LU 100 in Santa Rosa, La Pampa (FM station)
- Mar azul in Villa Gessell, Buenos Aires
- Máster in Machagai, Chaco
- Medios del Aire in General Roca, Río Negro
- Monte in Monte Hermoso, Buenos Aires
- Nueva Era in Charata, Chaco
- O in San Carlos de Bariloche, Río Negro
- Radio María in Catriel, Río Negro
- San Cayetano in Corrientes
- Soho in Villa Carlos Paz, Córdoba
- Teen in Neuquén
- Vital in Villa Cañás, Santa Fe
- Vive in General Alvear, Buenos Aires

== Australia ==
- 2MBS in Sydney, New South Wales
- 8PNN in Darwin, Northern Territory
- ABC Northern Tasmania in Burnie, Tasmania
- 2MOR in Deniliquin, New South Wales
- 4MIC in Mount Isa, Queensland
- ABC Radio Perth in Perth, Western Australia
- 2EEE in Bega, New South Wales
- Radio National in Gloucester, New South Wales
- Triple J in Mount Gambier, South Australia

== Canada (Channel 273) ==
- CBDS-FM in Pukatawagan, Manitoba
- CBKR-FM in Regina, Saskatchewan
- CBLA-FM-4 in Shelburne, Ontario
- CBRD-FM in Red Deer, Alberta
- CBTK-FM-3 in New Denver, British Columbia
- CBXH-FM in Jean D'Or, Alberta
- CBXP-FM in Grande Prairie, Alberta
- CFAT-FM in Ootsa Lake, British Columbia
- CION-FM-1 in Beauceville, Quebec
- CJFX-FM-1 in Inverness, Nova Scotia
- CJFX-FM-2 in Pleasant Bay, Nova Scotia
- CJTK-FM-3 in Elliot Lake, Ontario
- CKUA-FM-7 in Hinton, Alberta
- VF2208 in Kemano, British Columbia
- VF2295 in Onion Lake, Saskatchewan
- VOAR-12-FM in Wabush, Newfoundland and Labrador

== China ==
- Beijing Sports Radio in Beijing
- CRI News Radio in Shanghai, stopped airing in June 2020

== Israel ==
- Kol Chai Music in Central Israel

== Italy ==
- RTL 102.5 in Milan

== Malaysia ==
- Asyik FM in Selangor and Western Pahang
- Best FM in Eastern Johor
- Fly FM in Johor Bahru, Johor and Singapore

== Mexico ==
- XHES-FM in Chihuahua, Chihuahua
- XHHIH-FM in Ojinaga, Chihuahua
- XHIQ-FM in Ciudad Obregón, Sonora
- XHJA-FM in Xalapa, Veracruz
- XHLPS-FM in San Luis Río Colorado, Sonora
- XHMAX-FM in Los Mochis, Sinaloa
- XHMRT-FM in Tampico, Tamaulipas
- XHMVS-FM in Mexico City
- XHNPC-FM in Piedras Negras, Coahuila
- XHPINO-FM in Pinos, Zacatecas
- XHRPA-FM in Morelia, Michoacán
- XHRR-FM in Río Bravo, Tamaulipas
- XHSHT-FM in Saltillo, Coahuila
- XHUAN-FM in Tijuana, Baja California
- XHUCAH-FM in Tuxtla Gutiérrez, Chiapas
- XHUNI-FM in Ciudad Victoria, Tamaulipas
- XHUTT-FM in Villahermosa, Tabasco
- XHVTM-FM in Villa de Tamazulápam del Progreso, Oaxaca
- XHWS-FM in Culiacán, Sinaloa

== Palau ==
- T8WH-FM

== Philippines ==
- DXMM-FM in Cagayan de Oro City

== Russia ==
- DFM in Almetyevsk, Tatarstan
- Russian Radio in Achinsk, Krasnoyarsk border
- Europa Plus in Biysk, Altay region
- Jem FM in Yekaterinburg, Svedlovsk region
- Mayak in Kaliningrad, Kaliningrad region
- Radio Star in Kyzyl, Republic Tyva
- New Life in Magadan, Magadan region
- Radio Kontinental in Magnitogorsk, Chelyabinsk region
- Comedy Radio in Moscow, Moscow region
- Autoradio in Murmansk, Murmansk region
- Radio Dacha in Petropavlovsk-Kamchatskiy, Kamchatka border
- Silver Rain in Ryazan, Ryazan region
- NRJ in Samara, Samara region
- Radio Chanson in Sochi, Krasnodar border
- Retro FM in Surgut, Khanty-Mansiyskiy region
- Retro FM in Tomsk, Tomsk region
- Russian Radio in Tyumen, Tyumen region
- Vesti FM in Ulyanovsk, Ulyanovsk region
- Radio Chanson in Ufa, Republic Bachikiria
- Europa Plus in Cheboksary, Republic Chuvashia
- Europa Plus in Yuzhno-Sakhalinsk, Sakhalin region
- Europa Plus in Yakutsk, Republic Yakutia

== Turkey ==
- TRT FM in Hassa, Hatay Province

== United Kingdom ==
- Black Country Radio in Black Country
- Clyde 1 in Glasgow
- Greatest Hits Radio Cumbria & South West Scotland in Penrith
- Hits Radio West Yorkshire in Huddersfield and Leeds
- MFR in Caithness
- Nova Radio North East in Newcastle upon Tyne
- MônFm on Anglesey
- Q Radio Belfast in Bangor and Carrickfergus
- Radio Pembrokeshire in Pembrokeshire

== United States (Channel 273) ==
- KACY in Arkansas City, Kansas
- KALN (FM) in Dexter, New Mexico
- KAVZ-LP in Deming, Washington
- KBBB in Bay City, Texas
- KBLS in North Fort Riley, Kansas
- KBMF-LP in Butte, Montana
- KBRQ in Hillsboro, Texas
- KCBN in Whitesboro, Texas
- KCDC in Loma, Colorado
- KCHI-FM in Chillicothe, Missouri
- KCNQ in Kernville, California
- KCXB-LP in West Monroe, Louisiana
- KDKE in Superior, Wisconsin
- KDNA in St. Louis, Missouri
- KDON in Salinas, California
- KDUQ in Ludlow, California
- KDVL in Devils Lake, North Dakota
- KEFW-LP in Fort Worth, Texas
- KELT (FM) in Encinal, Texas
- KEZK in Saint Louis, Missouri
- KGBZ-LP in Madras, Oregon
- KGGN in Hemet, California
- KHLB in Mason, Texas
- KHOC in Casper, Wyoming
- KIAK in Fairbanks, Alaska
- KIBR in Sandpoint, Idaho
- KIOT in Los Lunas, New Mexico
- KIXQ in Joplin, Missouri
- KJFI-LP in Houston, Texas
- KKCI in Goodland, Kansas
- KKCV in Rozel, Kansas
- KKDY in West Plains, Missouri
- KKWB in Kelliher, Minnesota
- KKYR in Texarkana, Texas
- KLEK-LP in Jonesboro, Arkansas
- KLPM-LP in Lake Providence, Louisiana
- KMAY-LP in York, Nebraska
- KMAZ-LP in Houston, Texas
- KMFX in Lake City, Minnesota
- KMGI in Pocatello, Idaho
- KMSO in Missoula, Montana
- KNHT in Rio Dell, California
- KNIX in Phoenix, Arizona
- KNVR in Fallon, Nevada
- KOCQ-LP in Denton, Texas
- KOTN (FM) in Gould, Arkansas
- KPIA-LP in Huntsville, Texas
- KPZK in Cabot, Arkansas
- KQIC in Willmar, Minnesota
- KQSE in Gypsum, Colorado
- KRAO in Colfax, Washington
- KRER-LP in Emory, Texas
- KSFM in Woodland, California
- KSFP-LP in San Francisco, California
- KSNI in Santa Maria, California
- KSTZ in Des Moines, Iowa
- KSWH-LP in Arkadelphia, Arkansas
- KTCX in Beaumont, Texas
- KTNT (FM) in Eufaula, Oklahoma
- KTRR in Loveland, Colorado
- KUAK-LP in Bismarck, North Dakota
- KUGO in Grand Canyon Village, Arizona
- KUHS-LP in Hot Springs, Arkansas
- KWAK-LP in San Xavier, Arizona
- KWOJ-LP in San Angelo, Texas
- KXAM in San Diego, Texas
- KXSF-LP in San Francisco, California
- KZII in Lubbock, Texas
- KZOK in Seattle, Washington
- KZSD in Martin, South Dakota
- WAGR in Lexington, Mississippi
- WAJA-LP in Rocky Mount, North Carolina
- WARJ in Shawsville, Virginia
- WBAZ in Bridgehampton, New York
- WBOC in Princess Anne, Maryland
- WCMM in Gulliver, Michigan
- WCNU-LP in Bridgeton, New Jersey
- WDVE in Pittsburgh, Pennsylvania
- WDXB in Pelham, Alabama
- WERX in Columbia, North Carolina
- WEZG-LP in Statesville, North Carolina
- WFMF in Baton Rouge, Louisiana
- WGLU in Warner Robins, Georgia
- WGNN in Fisher, Illinois
- WHPT in Sarasota, Florida
- WHVC in Rhinebeck, New York
- WIKD-LP in Daytona Beach, Florida
- WIOG in Bay City, Michigan
- WIOZ in Southern Pines, North Carolina
- WJKX in Ellisville, Mississippi
- WJRE in Galva, Illinois
- WKLB in Waltham, Massachusetts
- WKMH in Hudson, Michigan
- WKVR in Baltimore, Ohio
- WKXU in Hillsborough, North Carolina
- WLDQ in Dothan, Alabama
- WLTO in Nicholasville, Kentucky
- WMDH in New Castle, Indiana
- WMYI in Hendersonville, North Carolina
- WNPA-LP in Canton, Ohio
- WNWC in Madison, Wisconsin
- WOLD in Marion, Virginia
- WOWF in Crossville, Tennessee
- WPHZ in Orleans, Indiana
- WPIK in Summerland Key, Florida
- WPRT in Pegram, Tennessee
- WPZE in Mableton, Georgia
- WQSS in Camden, Maine
- WRFY in Reading, Pennsylvania
- WSOJ-LP in Mcminnville, Tennessee
- WTOK-FM in San Juan, Puerto Rico
- WBKV in Buffalo, New York
- WUIC-LP in Wallins Creek, Kentucky
- WUMX in Rome, New York
- WUSQ in Winchester, Virginia
- WWBZ-LP in Hyden, Kentucky
- WWGW-LP in Moultrie, Georgia
- WXLY in North Charleston, South Carolina
- WYNR in Waycross, Georgia
- WZCS-LP in Springfield, Massachusetts
- WZOO in Edgewood, Ohio
