= List of radio stations in Cyprus =

Cyprus has a thriving radio landscape, with 93% of Greek Cypriots tuning in every day. Most stations broadcast in FM, and there's a mixture of state and private-run stations. This article lists all radio stations broadcasting in the southern part of Cyprus and overviews the major stations broadcasting from Northern Cyprus. The British sovereign military bases of Akrotiri and Dhekelia also operate radio transmitters. In addition to domestic broadcasts, Cyprus hosts international broadcast centres beaming content to the Middle East.

== Republic of Cyprus ==
=== Public stations ===
The Cyprus Broadcasting Corporation charter mandates a diverse radio programme with national coverage. It currently produces 4 radio programmes. The table below only includes high-power transmitters and omits low-power transmitters that serve as gap-fillers for areas with difficult reception.

FM Frequencies MHz	AM Frequencies kHz	Native Name	English Name	On air since	Description
97.2, 91.4, 92.4, 105.0	963, 693	Πρώτο Πρόγραμμα ΡΙΚ	CyBC Radio 1	1953	News, talk, education, history, culture and tradition
91.1, 93.1, 94.2, 97.9		Δεύτερο Πρόγραμμα ΡΙΚ	CyBC Radio 2	1953	Turkish, Armenian and English programming aimed at Turkish Cypriots, Armenian Cypriots and non-Greek-speaking residents
94.8, 94.0, 96.0, 106.7	603, 999	Τρίτο Πρόγραμμα ΡΙΚ	CyBC Radio 3	1990	Flagship news, sports and entertainment
88.2, 90.2, 90.5, 100.9		Τέταρτο Πρόγραμμα ΡΙΚ	CyBC Radio 4	2006	24hr classical, jazz and rock music

=== Private stations ===
==== National coverage ====
FM Frequencies MHz	Website	Native Name	Transcription	On air since	Description
87.7, 93.2, 102.5, 107.4		Active FM 87,7		2017	News and talk (ex. Choice FM Nicosia, Klik FM and Radio Diastasi)
88.5, 89.0		Kiss FM Cyprus		1996	Foreign music from 80s to the biggest current; located from Engomi
90.8, 102.3, 104.6		Mix FM Cyprus		2002	Foreign Adult Top 40, pop and dance music; located from Engomi
92.8, 87.6, 105.3		Ράδιο Άστρα	Radio Astra	7 December 1994	News; Progressive talk radio station located from Nicosia
93.3, 90.5, 101.9		Αληθινός Λόγος	Alithinos Logos	2018	Religious radio with talk; rebroadcasting with Peiraiki Ecclesia
93.5, 100.1		Radio DeeJay		2002	Foreign Adult Top 40, pop and dance music (ex. Heracles Radio)
95.0, 90.0		Σπορ FM	Sport FM	2017	Sports and talk; rebroadcasting with Bwin Sport FM 94,6 Athens
95.5, 93.7, 98.8		Ράδιο Πάφος	Radio Paphos	1990	Diverse with news, talk and Greek music; located from Paphos
96.1, 91.5, 101.4		Alpha Κύπρου	Alpha Cyprus	2024	Diverse with news, talk and Greek music (ex. Capital Radio)
96.4, 99.0		Ράδιο Ζενίθ	Zenith Radio	1991	Greek and foreign pop music; located from Nisou
98.2, 89.6, 103.0, 105.5		Κλικ 98.2	Klik 98.2	1 April 2002 (Local); 10 December 2011 (National)	Greek pop music (ex. Flash Cyprus and Radio Limassol)
98.4, 92.6, 99.8, 102.1		Κανάλι Επτά	Kanali Epta	1994	Diverse radio with news, talk and music; located from Strovolos
99.0		Русское Радио	Russian Radio	2020	Russian-speaking radio (ex. Russian Wave, Extra, Asteras 102.2)
99.3, 89.4, 87.9		Ράδιο Πρώτο	Radio Proto	3 September 1990	Conservative talk and Greek music; located from Strovolos
99.5, 97.0, 92.2		NJOY		2017	Adult Top 40 and easy listening (ex. U Radio 99,6)
100.3, 104.0, 93.3, 90.7		Supersport		2004	Sports and talk; rebroadcasting with Ellada Sports 94,3
101.1, 101.6, 101.7, 101.9		Δίεση Κύπρου	Diesi Cyprus	2018	Rebroadcasting with Diesi FM 101,3 Greece (ex. Logos Radio)
103.2, 103.5, 105.7, 95.5, 94.4, 93.3, 90.5		MyRadioArt		2014	Dance music (ex. NRJ, MyRadioArt, Music Radio, Eroticos & Free 944)
103.7, 102.7		ANT1 Radio		1998	Greek Adult Top 40, pop and dance music; located from Strovolos
104.3, 98.2, 89.8		Choice FM		2003	Foreign pop, rock and hip hop music; located from Limassol
104.8, 103.4, 95.7		Super FM		1998	Greek and foreign pop music; located from Nicosia
105.7, 103.3, 100.7, 98.1, 88.7		Love 105,7		2012	Greek and foreign pop music (ex. Radio Athina)
106.4, 107.9, 102.5, 96.8, 94.2		Sfera FM		2003	Greek pop music; rebroadcasting with Sfera 102,2
106.7, 107.5, 102.9, 100.5, 100.3		Δρόμος FM	Dromos FM	2012	Greek pop music; rebroadcasting with Dromos FM 89,8
107.0, 106.9, 106.0, 98.6		Κανάλι 6	Kanali 6	30 September 1991 (Local); 2002 (National)	Diverse with news, talk and music; located from Limassol
107.2, 106.7, 102.1, 98.5, 93.7		Rock Paphos		2002	Playing today's best mix in pop and rock music
107.6, 97.6		Πολίτης FM	Politis FM	2010	News and talk (ex. Energy and Helios)

==== Local coverage ====
===== Nicosia =====
FM Frequencies MHz	Website	Native Name	On air since	Description
91.4		The G.C. School Radio	2006	Low-power student radio station
95.2		UCy Voice 95,2	2006	Low-power student radio by the University of Cyprus
99.9		TOP FM	2001	Foreign pop, rock and hip hop music; located from Nicosia

===== Limassol =====
FM Frequencies MHz	Website	Native Name	Transcription	On air since	Description
91.4		Retro Radio 91.4		2024	Greek pop music (ex. Greek Choice Radio, Russian Hit FM and Coast FM)
91.6		Cool Radio Cyprus		2018	Foreign dance and pop music (ex. Play FM, Fresh and Evrithmo)
94.5, 102.9, 107.9		Απόστολος Ανδρέας	Apostolos Andreas	2002	Religious station; rebroadcasting with Ecclesia FM 89.5
95.2		CUT Radio 95,2		2013	Low-power radio by Cyprus University of Technology
95.2		Pissouri Chariandry		2021	Low-power community news radio from Pissouri
103.1, 103.9		London Greek Radio		2019	Relays of the namesake radio station from UK
104.5		Radio Monte Carlo		2024	Greatest soft pop hits from 70s to now (ex. Star FM)

===== Larnaca =====
Stations broadcasting in the Larnaca District usually can be received in Famagusta as well.

FM Frequencies MHz	Website	Native Name	Transcription	On air since	Description
91.9		Τάγμα Οδοιπόρων Αγάπης	Order of Pilgrims of Love	1992	Religious Interest (Orthodox), Kition Bishopric Scouts
93.0		London Greek Radio		2019	Relays of the namesake radio station from UK
93.7		Star FM 93,7		2005	24hr Greek music (ex. Radio Larnaca)
97.0		Όλα 97 FM	Ola 97 FM	2016	24hr Greek music (ex. Radio Lux 97 FM)
98.6		Mega Radio		1997	Eclectic Greek music, headline news and talk

===== Paphos =====
FM Frequencies MHz	Website	Native Name	Transcription	On air since	Description
87.7, 87.9, 105.6		Ράδιο Πύργος	Radio Pyrgos	2010	Greek traditional music; located from Paphos
95.2, 91.4		Κόσμος FM	Cosmos FM	1991	Diverse radio, associated with local newspaper Adesmevtos
104.3		Viva FM		2020	Playing the greatest hits from the 60's, 70's, 80's, 90's and beyond

===== Famagusta =====
FM Frequencies MHz	Website	Native Name	Transcription	On air since	Description
93.0		London Greek Radio		2019	Relays of the namesake radio station from UK
106.3		Ράδιο Νάπα 106.3	Radio Napa 106.3	1995	Foreign pop and rock music
106.7		Πολιτεία FM	Politeia FM	2000	Entertainment

==== Web radios ====
- Cherry
- Nea Polis

==== International broadcasters ====
Four medium wave stations broadcast to the Middle East from Cyprus. The BBC Arabic service transmitter is located at Zygi, Limassol. Another BBC MW transmitter is located within the area of the sovereign bases. The rest broadcast from Cape Greco, Famagusta. Although not the target audience, all stations can be received from within Cyprus.

Funding Country	AM Frequencies kHz	Native Name	English Name	On air since	Description
UK	693	بي بي سي العربية	BBC Arabic	1957	BBC World Service
USA	990	رادیو سوا	Radio Sawa	2002	US External Service
France	1233	مونت كارلو الدولية	Monte Carlo Doualiya	1972	Radio France Internationale
UK	1323	BBC World Service		1957	World Service in English

== Akrotiri and Dhekelia ==
Two FM radio stations broadcast from the Eastern and Western Sovereign Base Areas and through relays in areas controlled by the Republic of Cyprus, operated by the British Forces Broadcasting Service.

FM Frequencies MHz	Native Name	On air since	Description
91.7, 99.6, 89.9	BFBS Cyprus	1979	Locally produced
92.1, 95.3, 89.7	BFBS Radio 2	1979	Produced in London

== Occupied Cyprus ==
=== Public stations ===
When Turkish Cypriots withdrew from all official positions in the Republic of Cyprus in the aftermath of the Cypriot intercommunal violence, Bayrak assumed the role of the public broadcaster for the Turkish Cypriot enclaves first, and occupied Cyprus after 1974. It currently produces six radio programmes on FM while Turkey's public broadcaster TRT emits in Northern Cyprus via Radyo 1, Radyo 2 and TRT Haber and also the radio station of the Presidency of Religious Affairs of Turkey called Diyanet Radyo.

FM Frequencies MHz	Native Name	English Name	On air since	Description
88.4, 93.4, 102.5	Bayrak Klasik	Bayrak Classic	1997	Classical and world music
92.1, 98.1, 94.2, 88.8	Bayrak FM		1997	Turkish popular music
92.6, 97.5	Diyanet Radyo	Religious Radio	2012	Islam news and culture
94.6	Bayrak Türk Müziği	Bayrak Turkish Music	1997	Turkish folk music
97.4	TRT Haber	TRT News	2010	News and culture
100.1	Bayrak Radyo Haber	Bayrak News Radio	1997	News and culture
101.5, 94.4	Radyo 2	Radio 2	1964	Turkish popular music
102.0, 90.6, 89.6	Bayrak Radyosu	Bayrak Radio	1963	News and culture
103.8, 106.2	Radyo 1	Radio 1	1927	News and culture
105.0, 87.8	Bayrak International		1966	Diverse English programming, occasional shows in Greek and Arabic, News in English, Greek, Russian, French, German, and Arabic

=== Private stations ===
FM Frequencies MHz	Website	Native Name	Transcription	On air since	Description
87.5, 89.8		Radyo Vatan	Radio Vatan	1999	Anatolian rock and pop music
88.0		YDÜ Radyo 88	NEU Radio 88	1999	Anatolian rock and pop music
89.2, 90.4, 90.8		Radyo Güven	Radio Trust	2002	Anatolian rock and pop music
89.5, 98.6		Sim Radyo	Sim Radio	2002	Anatolian rock and pop music
90.0, 96.6		First FM		2013	Anatolian rock and pop music
90.9, 99.8		Juke FM		2012	Anatolian rock and pop music
91.3		Diyalog FM	Dialogue FM	2013	Anatolian rock and pop music
91.5, 106.8		Erkam Radyo	Erkam Radio	2013	Anatolian rock and pop music
93.1, 100.0		Enerji Radyo	Energy Radio	2004	Pop music (ex. NRG Türk)
93.8		Capital FM		2015	Pop music
94.4, 104.5		Radyo Türkü	Folk Radio	2008	Pop music
95.5, 95.2		Dance FM	Dance FM	1998	Pop music
97.0		Kıbrıs Türk FM	Cyprus Turkish FM	2023	Pop music (ex. Sara FM)
100.4, 104.3		Radyo Nihavent	Radio Nihavent	2006	Pop music
100.9		Hit FM 100.9	Hit FM 100.9	2018	Adult contemporary music
101.3, 96.0		Mayıs FM	May FM	2004	Adult contemporary music
102.9, 107.2		Play FM		2013	Adult contemporary music
103.1		ODTÜ	METU	2008	Adult contemporary music
103.4		Kıbrıs Radyo	Cyprus Radio	1997	Adult contemporary music
104.2, 102.8		Dream Live Urban		2020	Adult contemporary music
106.2, 99.7		Enerji Slow	Energy Slow	2017	Easy listening (ex. Smooth)
106.5		DAÜ FM	EMU FM	1999	Adult contemporary music
106.9		Kral FM	King FM	1993	Adult contemporary music
107.1		Capital Türk	Capital Turkish	2017	Adult contemporary music
107.8		Radyo Havadis	Radio Havadis	2013	Adult contemporary music

== Defunct stations ==
- British East Mediterranean Relay Station
