= 95.0 FM =

FM radio frequency

The following radio stations broadcast on FM frequency 95.0 MHz:

== Bahrain ==
- 95.0FM Traditional FM in Bahrain

== Cambodia ==
- 95.0 Bayon FM, sister radio channel for Bayon Television

== China ==
- CNR The Voice of China in Changsha, Hainan Prefecture and Hengyang
- GRT Pearl River Economic Radio in Zengcheng

== Cyprus ==
- Sport 95 FM in Frederick University
- Radio Amore FM, in Limassol

== India ==
- FM Tadka 95 FM in Jaipur, Rajasthan
- Hit 95FM in New Delhi NCR
- Radio Mirchi (alternative frequency) in Bengaluru, Karnataka
- Radio One (alternative frequency) in Hyderabad, Telangana

== Ireland ==
- Limerick's Live 95FM

== Israel ==
- Kan Bet in Arabah, Beersheba, the Galilee Panhandle, Gush Dan, Haifa, Jerusalem, the Jordan Rift Valley and Negev

== Laos ==
- Lao National Radio

== Malta ==
- Bastjaniżi FM in Qormi

== New Zealand ==
- 95 BOP FM in Tauranga
- 90-3 More FM Kapiti/Horowhenua, formerly "Horowhenua's 95FM", in Horowhenua
- Port FM in Fairlie
- Fresh FM in Takaka
- Tahu FM in Dundedin

== Romania ==
- Virgin Radio Romania in Pitești

== Russia ==
- NRJ Russia (alternative frequency) in St. Petersburg
- Radio MIR, in Novosibirsk

== Singapore ==
- Class 95

== Turkey ==
- TRT FM in Bursa
- TRT Radyo Haber in Ankara
- Acik Radyo in Istanbul

== United Kingdom ==
- BBC Radio Gloucestershire in Stroud
- Celtic Music Radio in Glasgow, Scotland
- BBC Radio Shropshire in Ludlow, England
- MKFM in Wolverton
- Fiesta FM in Southampton, England

== Vietnam ==
- 95.0 FM in Ninh Thuận

== Zimbabwe ==
- Khulumani FM in Bulawayo

== Other 95 FMs ==
These radio stations have used the moniker "95FM" even though their actual radio frequencies are not 95.0 MHz:

- KBVB, "Bob 95 FM", in Barnesville, Minnesota, US
- KICT-FM, "T-95FM", in Wichita, Kansas, US
- WOBR-FM, "Beach 95FM", in Wanchese, North Carolina, US
- WQHY, "Q95FM", in Prestonsburg, Kentucky, US
- "Q95 FM", in Dominica
- WFGI-FM, "Froggy 95FM", in Johnstown, Pennsylvania, US
- WWRM, "95FM", in Tampa, Florida, US
- WXIL, "My 95 FM", in Elizabeth, West Virginia, US
- 951 Remix, in Trinidad and Tobago
