= List of radio stations in Turkey =

This is a list of the radio stations in Turkey.

FM Frequency (MhZ)	Name	City	Genre	References
87.6	DAMLA FM	Istanbul	Arabic News & Folk Music	
87.8	X RADIO	Istanbul	Rap/Hip Hop	
88.0	RADYO 34	Istanbul	Hip Hop/Pop/News(Talk Shows)	
88.2	Radyo 3	Istanbul	Western music	
88.4	LALEGÜL FM	Istanbul	Cultural	
88.6	İSTANBUL FM	Istanbul	Pop/News(Talk Shows)	
88.8	TRT RADYO HABER	Istanbul	News	
89.0	JOY TÜRK	Istanbul	Pop	
89.2	ALEM FM	Istanbul	Mixed	
89.4	SIARAY TÜRK	Istanbul	Chinese-owned, News, Talk shows and (mostly) Classic (Turkish) Music	
89.6	KAFA RADYO	Istanbul	Turkish pop music, Talk shows	
89.8	SHOW RADYO	Istanbul	Commentary/Pop	
90.0	RADYO VİVA	Istanbul	Turkish Music	
90.2	A HABER RADYO	Istanbul	News	
90.4	HABERTÜRK RADYO	Istanbul	News	
90.6	RADYO 2000	Istanbul	Turkish Music	
90.8	SUPER FM	Istanbul	Turkish pop	
91.0	RADYO ALATURKA	Istanbul	Turkish Classical/Yeşilçam	
91.2	RADYO 45'LİK	Istanbul	70s/80s/90s contemporary	
91.4	TRT FM	Istanbul	Talk	
91.6	KISS FM	Istanbul	Variety - Music	
91.8	İSTANBULUN SESİ	Istanbul	Arabesque (Turkish music)	
92.0	KRAL FM	Istanbul	Pop	
92.2	RADYO KLASİK	Istanbul	Classical	
92.4	LİG RADYO	Istanbul	Sports	
92.6	RADYO CNN TURK	Istanbul	News	
92.8	BLOOMBERG HT RADYO	Istanbul	Business News	
93.0	A SPOR RADYO	Istanbul	Sports	
93.2	TGRT FM	Istanbul	News and Talk	
93.4	KARADENİZİN SESİ	Istanbul	Black Sea Music	
93.6	RADYO TURKUVAZ	Istanbul	Turkish pop	
93.8	Radyo FG	Istanbul	Electronic music	
94.0	MEDYA FM	Istanbul	Government-owned radio	
94.2	POLİS RADYOSU	Istanbul	Government-sponsored news and information	
94.4	RADYO EKİN	Istanbul	Turkish folk music	
94.8	KRAL POP	Istanbul	pop music	
95.0	Açık Radyo	Istanbul	Independent talk and music	
95.4	SLOW TURK	Istanbul		
95.6	RADYO 1	Istanbul		
95.8	RADYO GOL	Istanbul		
96.0	LOUNGE FM	Istanbul		
96.2	RADYO EKSEN	Istanbul		
96.4	CEM RADYO	Istanbul		
96.6	YÖN RADYO	Istanbul		
96.8	MORAL FM	Istanbul		
97.0	RADYO FENERBAHÇE	Istanbul		
97.2	METRO FM	Istanbul		
97.6	RADYO TRAFİK MARMARA	Istanbul		
97.8	RS FM	Istanbul		
98.0	DİYANET RADYO	Istanbul		
98.2	KARADENİZ FM	Istanbul		
98.4	BEST FM	Istanbul		
98.6	NUMBER 1 TURK	Istanbul		
98.8	STAR ARTI	Istanbul		
99.2	PAL NOSTALJİ	Istanbul		
99.4	RADYO BABYLON	Istanbul		
99.6	TRT RADYO 4	Istanbul		
99.8	POWER TÜRK	Istanbul		
100.0	POWER FM	Istanbul		
100.2	POWER PLUS FM	Istanbul		
100.4	Radyo Fenomen	Istanbul		
100.6	JOY FM	Istanbul		
100.8	ULUSAL RADYO	Istanbul		
101.0	POWER POP	Istanbul		
101.2	RADYO SEMERKAND	Istanbul		
101.4	TRT ARAPÇA	Istanbul		
101.6	TRT NAĞME	Istanbul		
101.8	RADYO MEGA	Istanbul		
102.0	LUXURY LOUNGE	Istanbul		
102.2	SEYR FM	Istanbul		
102.4	NUMBER ONE FM	Istanbul		
102.6	DİYANET RADYO	Istanbul		
102.8	NTV RADYO	Istanbul		
103.0	METEOROLOJİNİN SESİ RADYOSU	Istanbul		
103.2	ÖZEL FM	Istanbul		
103.4	TRT TÜRKÜ	Istanbul		
103.6	RADYO LIGHT	Istanbul		
103.8	RADYO TATLISES	Istanbul		
104.0	RADYO D	Istanbul		
104.2	RADYO TRAFİK	Istanbul		
104.4	BİZİM RADYO	Istanbul		
104.6	RADYO 7	Istanbul		
104.8	TRT RADYO HABER	Istanbul		
105.0	ERKAM RADYO	Istanbul		
105.2	TRT RADYO 1	Istanbul		
105.4	HABERTÜRK RADYO	Istanbul		
105.6	BABA RADYO	Istanbul		
105.8	ST ENDÜSTRİ RADYO	Istanbul		
106.0	PAL STATİON	Istanbul		
106.2	VIRGIN RADIO TURKEY	Istanbul	Rap/Hip Hop	
106.4	DİYANET KUR'AN RADYO	Istanbul	Islamic	
106.6	PAL FM	Istanbul		
107.0	RADYO SEYMEN	Istanbul		
107.2	RADYO SPOR	Istanbul		
107.4	RADYO VOYAGE	Istanbul		
107.6	AKRA FM	Istanbul	Talk	
107.8	RADYO HEVİ	Istanbul		
87.5	KAFA RADYO	Ankara		
87.7	PAL FM	Ankara		
88.0	TRT FM (ÇALDAĞ)	Ankara		
88.2	DİYANET KUR'AN RADYO	Ankara	Islamic	
88.4	RADYO TRAFİK ANKARA	Ankara		
88.6	BABA RADYO	Ankara		
88.8	SHOW RADYO	Ankara		
89.0	CNN TÜRK RADYO	Ankara		
89.2	DOST FM	Ankara		
89.8	RADYO 7	Ankara		
90.0	TRT RADYO HABER (ELMADAĞ)	Ankara		
90.2	RADYO TURKUVAZ	Ankara		
90.4	HABERTÜRK RADYO	Ankara		
90.6	RADYO 2000	Ankara		
90.8	SÜPER FM	Ankara		
91.0	RADYO İLEF	Ankara		
91.2	TRT RADYO 3 (ÇALDAĞ)	Ankara		
91.4	PAL NOSTALJİ	Ankara		
91.6	CRI TÜRK FM	Ankara		
91.8	HEDEF RADYO	Ankara		
92.1	RADYO DENGE	Ankara		
92.4	METEOROLOJİNİN SESİ RADYOSU	Ankara		
92.7	RADYO SES	Ankara		
93.0	RADYO VİZYON	Ankara		
93.3	TRT RADYO 1	Ankara		
93.6	RADYO VİVA	Ankara	Turkish Music	
93.8	VIRGIN RADIO TÜRKİYE	Ankara		
94.0	DİYANET KUR'AN RADYO	Ankara	Islamic	
94.2	RADYO BEYAZ	Ankara		
94.4	POLİS RADYOSU	Ankara		
94.6	DİYANET RADYO	Ankara		
94.8	MAKRO FM	Ankara		
95.0	TRT RADYO HABER (ÇALDAĞ)	Ankara		
95.3	SLOWTÜRK RADYO	Ankara		
95.5	POLİS RADYOSU	Ankara		
95.8	MAX FM	Ankara		
96.0	OSTİM RADYO	Ankara		
96.2	RS FM	Ankara		
96.4	A SPOR RADYO	Ankara	Sports	
96.6	RADYO BİLKENT	Ankara		
96.8	PARK FM	Ankara		
97.0	RADYO FENERBAHÇE	Ankara		
97.2	METRO FM	Ankara		
97.6	NUMBER ONE TÜRK	Ankara	News	
97.8	RADYO SPOR	Ankara		
98.0	RADYO SHEMA	Ankara		
98.3	BEST FM	Ankara		
98.6	TRT TÜRKÜ	Ankara		
98.8	RADYO FENOMEN	Ankara		
99.1	RADYO BANKO	Ankara		
99.3	PAL STATION	Ankara		
99.5	RADYO FENOMEN	Ankara		
99.7	A HABER RADYO	Ankara	News	
100.0	POWER FM	Ankara		
100.3	TRT FM (ELMADAĞ)	Ankara		
100.7	KAFA RADYO	Ankara		
100.9	PAL DOĞA	Ankara		
101.1	RADYO MEGASİTE	Ankara		
101.3	TRT RADYO HABER (YENİMAHALLE)	Ankara		
101.5	NUMBER ONE FM	Ankara		
101.8	KRAL POP RADYO	Ankara		
102.1	AŞK FM	Ankara	Music and talk?	
102.4	KRAL FM	Ankara		
102.6	RADYO MEGA	Ankara		
102.8	TRT NAĞME	Ankara		
103.1	RADYO ODTÜ	Ankara		
103.4	MORAL FM	Ankara		
103.6	TRT RADYO 3 (ELMADAĞ)	Ankara		
103.8	RADYO 06	Ankara		
104.0	RADYO D	Ankara		
104.2	RADYO BAŞKENT	Ankara		
104.4	TGRT FM	Ankara		
104.7	NTV RADYO	Ankara		
104.9	ERKAM RADYO	Ankara		
105.1	ÖZGÜR RADYO	Ankara		
105.3	ALEM FM	Ankara/Newmahalle	Mixed?	
105.6	TRT RADYO 4	Ankara		
105.8	SEMERKAND RADYO	Ankara		
106.0	JOYTÜRK	Ankara		
106.3	ÖMÜR RADYO	Ankara		
106.5	JOY FM	Ankara		
106.7	RADYO ANKARA	Ankara		
106.9	POWERTÜRK	Ankara		
107.1	AVRASYA TÜRK	Ankara		
107.4	AKRA FM	Ankara	Talk	
107.8	TRT RADYO 1 (YENİMAHALLE)	Ankara		
102.1	TEMPO FM	Tekirdağ		
101.3	YÖRE FM	Tokat		
92.0	RADYO TOKAT	Tokat		
90.5	RADY EXTREME	Tokat		
93.0	Damga FM	Antalya		
93.3	Wrong Soul Radio Station	Antalya		
93.5	OLAY FM	Antalya		
95.0	RADYO AKDENİZ	Antalya		
95.5	Radyo Mc Likya FM	Antalya		
96.0	RADYO TOROS LINE	Antalya		
96.5	RADYO MUBA	Antalya		
98.0	RADYO MARTI	Antalya		
103.1	RADYO KUMSAL	Antalya		
105.0	Antalya FM	Antalya	Folk music	
106.4	SET FM	Antalya		
107.6	RADYO UMUT	Antalya		
105.4	TRT Trabzon - TRT Radyo 3			
94.0	Radyo Aktif	Trabzon		
102.0	Bayrak Fm	Trabzon		
99.0	Yıldız Fm	Trabzon		
96.0	Radyo Kadırga	Trabzon		
91.0	Radyo Trabzon	Trabzon		
96.4	Radyo T	Trabzon		
103.5	Radyo Bordo Mavi	Trabzon		
97.8	Kuzey FM	Trabzon		
98.5	Taka FM	Trabzon		
93.5	Zigana Radyo	Trabzon		
106.2	Radyo KTÜ	Trabzon		
97.3	Radyo Lojik	Afyon		
90.4	Alem FM	Afyon	Mixed?	
103.8	Alem FM	Adana	Mixed?	
89.3	Alem FM	Antalya Hotels	Mixed?	
89.3	Alem FM	Antalya/Alanya	Mixed?	
92.3	Alem FM	Aydin	Mixed?	
90.7	Alem FM	Balikesir	Mixed?	
98.3	Alem FM	Balikesir/Ayvalik	Mixed?	
