= 95.6 FM =

FM radio frequency

The following radio stations broadcast on FM frequency 95.6 MHz:

== China ==
- Beijing Traffic Radio in Beijing
- CNR The Voice of China in Shijiazhuang and Wuhan
- Radio Kaiping in Jiangmen

== Malaysia ==
- Asyik FM in Malacca and Northern Johor
- Perak FM in Ipoh, Perak

== Morocco ==
- Hit Radio in Agadir

== Turkey ==
- Radyo 1 in İstanbul
- Radyo 2 in Antalya
- Radyo 2 in Niğde

== United Kingdom ==
- BBC Radio Norfolk in Cromer
- BBC Radio WM in the West Midlands
- BRFM in Isle of Sheppey
- BBC Radio Cumbria in Penrith
- Seahaven FM in Eastbourne
- BBC Radio 4 in Tyrone and Scotland

== Vietnam ==
- VOH 95.6, in Voice of Ho Chi Minh City People (VOH)
