= KMAZ =

KMAZ may refer to:

- KMAZ-LP, a low-power radio station (102.5 FM) licensed to serve Houston, Texas, United States
- KHKZ, a radio station (106.3 FM) licensed to serve San Benito, Texas
