= IHeartRadio Music Festival =

Music festival held in Las Vegas by iHeartRadio

iHeartRadio Music Festival
- iHeartRadio Music Festival display in 2017
- Genre: Various
- Locations: Main show: MGM Grand Garden Arena (2011–2015); T-Mobile Arena (2016–present); Daytime Village: Las Vegas Village (2013–2017); Las Vegas Festival Grounds (2018–2019); Area 15 (2021–2022)
- Years active: 2011–present
- Founders: iHeartRadio (iHeartMedia, Inc.)
- Website: festival.iheart.com

The iHeartRadio Music Festival is a two-day music concert festival held every year on the third or fourth weekend of September since 2011 by iHeartRadio along the Las Vegas Strip in Las Vegas, Nevada, United States.

From 2011 to 2015, the festival was held at the MGM Grand Garden Arena in Las Vegas, Nevada. In 2013, iHeartRadio added the free Daytime Village at the iHeartRadio Music Festival, which took place at Las Vegas Village until it was moved to the Las Vegas Festival Grounds in 2018. In 2016, the iHeartRadio Music Festival moved to the T-Mobile Arena (in unincorporated Paradise), and has hosted the main portion of the festival since.

The annual event has aired as a television special every year since its launch. In 2011, the event was televised by VH1, while every edition from 2012 to 2022 has been broadcast by The CW, kicking off that network's fall television season. Beginning with the 2023 festival, the concert was streaming exclusively on Hulu, although a free option remains available via iHeartRadio's stations. Beginning in 2026 it will be simulcast on Disney+.

According to Billboard, the main festival "showcases some of the most well-established artists in the genre" while the village showcases emerging artists. In 2013, the magazine wrote that the festival had "quickly established itself as a home to every major artist."

The iHeartRadio Music Festival is part of iHeartMedia's roster of major concert events including the nationwide iHeartRadio Jingle Ball Concert Tour, iHeartCountry Festival and the iHeartRadio Music Awards.

== Line-ups ==
=== 2011 ===
The 2011 iHeartRadio Music Festival took place on September 23 and 24. The lineup featured performances by The Black Eyed Peas, Kelly Clarkson, Bruno Mars, Carrie Underwood, Karmin, Jane's Addiction, Coldplay, Alicia Keys, Jay-Z (feat. Alicia Keys), Steven Tyler (with Jeff Beck feat. Nicole Scherzinger), Nicki Minaj, Rascal Flatts (feat. Natasha Bedingfield), Jennifer Lopez, Sublime with Rome, David Guetta (feat. Usher), Kenny Chesney and Lady Gaga (feat. Sting).

=== 2012 ===
The 2012 iHeartRadio Music Festival took place on September 21 and 22. The lineup featured performances by Rihanna, Green Day, Usher, Swedish House Mafia (feat. Usher), Lil Wayne (feat. Keyshia Cole), Psy, Jason Aldean, Bon Jovi, Megan and Liz, Miranda Lambert (feat. Pistol Annies), No Doubt (with Pink), Pitbull (feat. Ne-Yo), deadmau5 (feat. Gerard Way), Aerosmith, Linkin Park, Taylor Swift, Mary J. Blige (feat. Prince), Enrique Iglesias (feat. Sammy Adams and Pitbull), Calvin Harris (feat. Ne-Yo), Brad Paisley and Pink.

This event is best known for Green Day lead singer Billie Joe Armstrong's onstage meltdown, in which he ranted about a lack of engagement from the audience (this also happened with Linkin Park and Deadmau5) and their set being cut to 20 minutes due to Usher receiving 25 extra minutes for his performance. Armstrong and bassist Mike Dirnt smashed their instruments and walked off stage. Green Day announced that Armstrong had checked into rehab a few days afterwards and apologized on Armstrong's behalf, clarifying that their set was not being cut short.

=== 2013 ===
The 2013 iHeartRadio Music Festival took place on September 20 and 21. The lineup featured performances by Queen + Adam Lambert (feat. Fun), Justin Timberlake, Katy Perry (feat. Juicy J), Ylvis, Chris Brown (feat. Benny Benassi), Drake, Benny Benassi, Elton John, J. Cole (feat. Miguel and TLC), Fun, Miguel, Tiësto, Muse, Keith Urban, Robin Thicke, The Summer Set, Miley Cyrus, Kesha (feat. Joan Jett), Phoenix, Bruno Mars, Thirty Seconds to Mars, Maroon 5, Zedd, Tim McGraw and Paul McCartney.

The 2013 Daytime Village lineup featured Miley Cyrus, The Wanted, Jason DeRulo, The Band Perry, Avril Lavigne, Krewella, Cher Lloyd, Ne-Yo, Twenty One Pilots, Pete Tong, and Awolnation.

=== 2014 ===
The 2014 iHeartRadio Music Festival took place on September 19 and 20. The lineup featured performances by Ariana Grande (feat. Childish Gambino), Before You Exit, Usher (feat. Chris Brown), Zac Brown Band, Steve Aoki, Mötley Crüe, Nicki Minaj (feat. Ariana Grande), Coldplay, Taylor Swift, Iggy Azalea, Eric Church, Meghan Trainor, Calvin Harris, Bastille, John Legend, Lil Jon, Paramore, Lorde, Train, Weezer, Ed Sheeran and One Direction.

The 2014 Daytime Village lineup featured Lil Jon, Neon Trees, Iggy Azalea, Nico & Vinz, Meghan Trainor, Magic!, Fences (feat. Macklemore), Jason DeRulo, 5 Seconds of Summer, Childish Gambino, and Kacey Musgraves.

=== 2015 ===
The 2015 iHeartRadio Music Festival took place on September 18 and 19. The lineup featured performances by Demi Lovato, Kanye West, Sam Smith, Coldplay, David Guetta, Kenny Chesney, The Weeknd, Tove Lo, Lil Wayne, Fall Out Boy, Disclosure, Hozier, Jason Derulo, Shaggy, Duran Duran, Prince Royce, Diplo, Little Big Town, Kelly Clarkson, Trey Songz, The Killers, Blake Shelton, Nick Jonas, Diddy, Christina Grimmie and Jennifer Lopez. Janet Jackson was due to perform on September 19, but withdrew and was replaced by Jennifer Lopez.

The 2015 Daytime Village lineup featured Demi Lovato, Hozier, Tove Lo, Trey Songz, Walk the Moon, Nick Jonas, Big Sean, Lee Brice, George Ezra, Tori Kelly, Echosmith, James Bay, The Struts, Zella Day, and Shawn Mendes

=== 2016 ===
The 2016 iHeartRadio Music Festival took place on September 23 and 24. The lineup featured performances by Britney Spears (with special guest G-Eazy), Ariana Grande, Drake, Sam Hunt, Twenty One Pilots, Billy Idol, Florida Georgia Line, OneRepublic, Chris Young, Sia, Cage The Elephant, Tears For Fears, Pitbull, U2, Sting, Usher, Backstreet Boys, Green Day, and Zedd.

The 2016 Daytime Village lineup featured Daya, Troye Sivan, DNCE, Sam Hunt, Good Charlotte, The Chainsmokers, Cold War Kids, Hailee Steinfeld, Jeremih, Alessia Cara, Cage the Elephant, Lissie, Panic! at the Disco, and Bryson Tiller.

=== 2017 ===
The 2017 iHeartRadio Music Festival took place on September 22 and 23. The lineup featured performances by Coldplay, The Weeknd, DJ Khaled (feat. Demi Lovato, Quavo, French Montana, Chance the Rapper, and Travis Scott), Miley Cyrus, Lorde (feat. Jack Antonoff and Khalid), Kings of Leon, Big Sean, Pink, Chris Stapleton, Thirty Seconds to Mars, Niall Horan, David Guetta (feat. Bebe Rexha), Thomas Rhett, Harry Styles, Kesha, and Louis Tomlinson, plus iHeartRadio's Rising Star Winner James Maslow.

The 2017 Daytime Village lineup included Migos, Halsey, Flume, Little Mix, French Montana, Niall Horan, Bleachers, Kelsea Ballerini, Judah and the Lion, Bebe Rexha, Noah Cyrus, Hey Violet, Cheat Codes, All Time Low, Khalid, and Julia Michaels.

The annual tape-delayed broadcast of the festival was delayed by mutual decision by The CW and iHeartMedia on October 2 indefinitely in the aftermath of the 2017 Las Vegas shooting during the Route 91 Harvest festival the night before, as the iHeart Radio Music Festival utilized the same Las Vegas Village lot for the Daytime Festival the Route 91 festival did for their full event. It was eventually slotted on two nights over four hours, November 22 and 24, sandwiching Thanksgiving Day.

=== 2018 ===
The 2018 iHeartRadio Music Festival took place on September 21 and 22, with the Daytime Village moving to the Las Vegas Festival Grounds and memorials to the victims of the 2017 Route 91 Harvest festival also a part of the event. The lineup featured performances by Justin Timberlake, Mariah Carey, Jack White, Kelly Clarkson, Carrie Underwood, Lynyrd Skynyrd, Jason Aldean, Childish Gambino, Logic, Imagine Dragons, Ludacris, Panic! at the Disco, Luke Bryan, Little Big Town, Shawn Mendes, Rae Sremmurd, Kygo and Fleetwood Mac, plus iHeartRadio's Rising Star Winner Heffron Drive. Sam Smith was scheduled to perform on September 21 but had to cancel last minute due to vocal problems.

The Daytime Village lineup included Logic, Dua Lipa, 5 Seconds of Summer, Lil Uzi Vert, Dustin Lynch, Bazzi, Belly, Bobby Bones and the Raging Idiots, Greta Van Fleet, Bad Bunny, Grandson, Leon Bridges, MAX, Badflower, Evvie McKinney, The Vamps and Drax Project.

=== 2019 ===
The 2019 iHeartRadio Music Festival took place on September 20 and 21. The lineup featured Alicia Keys, Backstreet Boys, Cage the Elephant, Camila Cabello, Chance the Rapper, Def Leppard, Fletcher, French Montana, Halsey, Heart, H.E.R., Hootie and the Blowfish, Lil Nas X, Marshmello (feat. Kane Brown), Miley Cyrus, Mumford and Sons, Steve Aoki (feat. Darren Criss and Monsta X), T-Pain, Tim McGraw, Zac Brown Band, and Green Day.

The Daytime Village lineup included Maren Morris, Billie Eilish, Old Dominion, Zara Larsson, CNCO, Brett Young, H.E.R., Monsta X, Fletcher, Bryce Vine, Lauv and Loud Luxury.

=== 2020 ===
The 2020 iHeartRadio Music Festival in which celebrated the festival's 10th anniversary, took place on September 18 and 19, 2020. The lineup included performances by Alicia Keys, Bon Jovi (feat. Jennifer Nettles), BTS, Coldplay, John Legend, Kane Brown (feat. Khalid), Swae Lee, Keith Urban, Migos, Miley Cyrus, Miranda Lambert, Thomas Rhett, Tim McGraw, and Usher. Due to the COVID-19 pandemic all performances were held virtually and were viewable simultaneously on The CW & The CW app. The Daytime Village was cancelled this year.

=== 2021 ===
The 2021 iHeartRadio Music Festival took place on September 17 and 18. The lineup included performances by Black Pumas, Blake Shelton, Billie Eilish, Cheap Trick, Chris Stapleton, Coldplay, Dua Lipa, Florida Georgia Line, Imagine Dragons, Jason Aldean (with special guest Carrie Underwood), Jimmie Allen (with special guest Marshmello), Journey, Justin Bieber, Khalid, Lil Baby, Nelly, OneRepublic, Sam Hunt, Twenty One Pilots, The Weeknd, Weezer, J. Cole, and special guest Finneas.

The Daytime Village returned, hosted in an empty lot across from Area15. The lineup included Olivia Rodrigo, The Kid Laroi, Saweetie, All Time Low, 24kGoldn, Russell Dickerson, Yungblud, Gabby Barrett, Tate McRae, and Conan Gray.

Maroon 5 was set to perform at the festival on September 17, but dropped out due to a scheduling conflict. Addison Rae was also set to perform at the festival on September 18, but then canceled the day before. She stated, "I want to give my fans 110% and I don’t feel like I’m ready to do that."

DaBaby was removed from the festival line-up following homophobic remarks he made at the Rolling Loud Festival the prior July.

=== 2022 ===
The 2022 iHeartRadio Music Festival took place on September 23 and 24. The lineup included Avril Lavigne, Black Eyed Peas, Ed Sheeran, Halsey, Harry Styles, Lionel Richie, LL Cool J, Luke Combs, Maren Morris, Megan Thee Stallion, Morgan Wallen, Pat Benatar & Neil Giraldo, Pitbull, Sam Smith, The Black Keys, and P. Diddy. Nicki Minaj was scheduled to perform but canceled a few weeks prior.

The Daytime Village lineup included Avril Lavigne, Maggie Rogers, 5 Seconds of Summer, Big Time Rush, Girl in Red, Lauv, Chlöe, Willow Smith, Chase Rice, Latto, Carly Pearce, Ryan Hurd, GAYLE, Lauren Spencer-Smith, Jax, and Cheat Codes.

=== 2023 ===
The 2023 iHeartRadio Music Festival took place on September 22–23. The line-up for the festival included Foo Fighters, Fall Out Boy, Kelly Clarkson, Kane Brown, Lenny Kravitz, Lil Wayne, Travis Scott, Miguel, Lil Durk, Niall Horan, Public Enemy, Sheryl Crow, Tim McGraw, TLC, and Thirty Seconds to Mars.

=== 2024 ===
The 2024 iHeartRadio Music Festival took place on September 20–21. The line up for the festival included A$AP Rocky, Big Sean, The Black Crowes, Camila Cabello, Doja Cat, Dua Lipa, Gwen Stefani, Halsey, Hozier, Keith Urban, New Kids on the Block, Paramore, Shaboozey, Thomas Rhett, Victoria Monét, The Weeknd, plus a special appearance from Coldplay's Chris Martin.

=== 2025 ===
The 2025 iHeartRadio Music Festival took place on September 19–20. The line up for the festival included Bailey Zimmerman, BigXthaPlug, Bryan Adams, Diplo, Ed Sheeran, GloRilla, Jelly Roll, John Fogerty, Justice, LL COOL J, Mariah Carey, Maroon 5, Sammy Hagar, Tate McRae, The Offspring and Tim McGraw.

=== 2026 ===
The 2026 iHeartRadio Music Festival will take place on September 18 and 19. The line up for the festival will include Benson Boone, BTS, Cardi B, Ciara, Goo Goo Dolls, Kenny Chesney, Lainey Wilson, LE SSERAFIM, Major Lazer, Muse, Snoop Dogg, The Smashing Pumpkins, Weezer, Zara Larsson and special performance by Stella Lefty.

== Press coverage ==
Entertainment Weekly in its review of the inaugural festival called out the rotating stage as a mechanism that kept the show on schedule, noting that the festival "was all about instant gratification" with a general focus on radio hits. In 2012, the angry departure of singer Billie Joe Armstrong from the stage after organizers ended the Green Day set prematurely prompted coverage by news outlets such as Billboard, MTV, Fuse and Huffington Post. The year was also noted for a number of duets, including when unexpected performer Prince joined Mary J. Blige for two numbers, when P!nk sang "Just A Girl" with No Doubt, and when Swedish House Mafia teamed up with Usher in performing their song "Euphoria". In 2014, Billboard commented on the recent radio successes of the performers on the Daytime Village stage, stating that "With so many performers that had recently broken out of relative obscurity with smash singles, the iHeartRadio Village felt like a Top 40 playlist put on shuffle." In 2014, the Associated Press noted that a few surprises had been mixed with the show's "steady dose of hits", including an appearance of the Black Eyes Peas' Will.I.Am on stage with DJ Steve Aoki and "unexpected appearances" by Alicia Keys and Jason DeRulo.

== See also ==
- iHeartRadio Music Awards
- iHeartRadio Fiesta Latina, a spin-off to the iHeartRadio Music Festival
- iHeartRadio Country Festival, a spin-off to the iHeartRadio Music Festival
