= Açık =

Açık may refer to:

- Tutku Açık, Turkish basketball player
- Açık Radyo, a radio station in Istanbul, Turkey
