= KGGN =

KGGN may refer to:

- KGGN (FM), a radio station (102.5 FM) licensed to serve Hemet, California, United States
- KMVG, a radio station (890 AM) licensed to serve Gladstone, Missouri, United States, which held the call sign KGGN from 1987 to 2015
