= IHeartRadio Fiesta Latina =

iHeartRadio Fiesta Latina
- Genre: Latin
- Locations: The Forum, Inglewood, California
- Years active: 2014–present
- Founders: iHeartMedia, Inc.
- Website: fiesta.iheart.com

The iHeartRadio Fiesta Latina is a music festival sponsored by iHeartRadio. The inaugural 2014 edition was held on November 22 at The Forum in Inglewood, California, near Los Angeles. It was produced in association with Live Nation Entertainment. The festival is "a spin-off of the highly successful iHeartRadio Music Festival" dedicated to Latin music.

The festival was supposed to happen simultaneously with the competing 2014 edition of the Calibash, 10 miles (16 km) across town at the Staples Center. However, several days after the announcement of the iHeartRadio Fiesta Latina, it was decided that Calibash will be moved to January 24, 2015. The music was broadcast live across the United States on various radio stations. Official ticket prices through Ticketmaster ranged from $71.70 to $439.90.

== 2014 event ==
The event was preceded by a celebrity red carpet. Among the attendees were Christina Milian, Mario Lopez, Ryan Seacrest, Katy Tiz, Bleona, Oscar De La Hoya, Dascha Polanco and Selenis Leyva. A free pre-event concert called "La Villita" was held in the Forum parking lot before the show, featuring Taboo from the Black Eyed Peas, Becky G and Voz a Voz. Ricky Martin opened the show and Pitbull closed the show. Pitbull then hosted and performed at the 2014 American Music Awards the following evening.

August Brown, writing in the Los Angeles Times, said the show represented the dual interests of the young Latino audience. Some of the acts were "cosmopolitan, combining American hip-hop and R&B, European techno and the hip-swinging rhythms of the Spanish-speaking world," while others were "foundational acts in Latin popular and regional music."

Ramon Gonzales, for the Orange County Register, wrote that the five-hour festival "did a remarkable job of tending to the nuances under the umbrella of Latin music and featured a multitude of subgenres". He described that Martin whipped the crowd into such a frenzy, it allowed him to walk offstage almost as if to suggest, "Top that", then said the audience "had the pleasure of watching the collective bill impressively attempt just that". Gonzales described Alejandra Guzman getting the evening's photo op concluding "Hacer el Amor Con Otro" amid a shower of confetti. La Banda Original El Limon had the entire house singing the traditional "Cielito Lindo" while Pitbull emerged as the evening’s triumphant headliner, proving why he is considered the most bankable star in the Latin urban crossover market".

== 2015 event ==
On May 13, 2015, iHeartMedia announced that the 2015 event will be held on Saturday, November 7, 2015, at the American Airlines Arena in Miami and will be broadcast live on Yahoo! Live and on iHeartMedia-owned Spanish-Pop, Tropical, regional Mexican and Spanish Adult Hit radio stations across the U.S., as well as a special broadcast on the Spanish-language network Telemundo.

== 2014 line-up ==
- Ricky Martin
- Pitbull
- Daddy Yankee
- Prince Royce
- Roberto Tapia
- Alejandra Guzmán
- La Original Banda el Limón feat. Voz a Voz
- Jesse & Joy
- J Balvin
- Becky G

== See also ==
- iHeartRadio Music Festival
- iHeartRadio Country Festival
