= Bush League TV =

Bush League is a website and Internet video show for young men. The site covers sports, technology, gadgets, video games, girls, and popular culture, with videos consisting of how-tos, interviews, and behind-the-scenes event footage.

== History ==
Bush League TV (also known as Bush League) was formed in April 2008 and is headlined by comedians Matt Kirsch, John Wessling, Jim Patton, and writer John Walsh, among others. The website's official launch was on May 14, 2008, though the group created a livecast video for GTA IV in late April.

The site's writing staff includes an Emmy winner and a former editor of Maxim. It is funded by DECA, the Digital Entertainment Corporation of America and was created by Matt Kirsch and Allison Kingsley.

== GTA IV World Record ==
Bush League held a gaming marathon in April 2008, in which writer/producer Jim Patton attempted to get in the Guinness Book of World Records for longest time spent playing Grand Theft Auto IV. Patton played the game for 28 hours and video-streamed his efforts on Yahoo! Live, starting on April 29 at 5 pm. Patton was featured on NPR's Talk of the Nation on May 1, 2008. He succeeded in setting the record, and it was officially recognized by the Guinness Book of World Records on July 1, 2008.

== Bush League 101 ==
In May 2008, Bush League released its first how-to video “Bush League 101: How to Be a Porn Star.” The video includes interviews with porn stars on the set of a Hustler porn spoof of The Brady Bunch, "Not the Bradys XXX: Marcia, Marcia, Marcia." Porn stars interviewed include Teagan Presley, Kris Slater, James Deen, and Alana Evans.

Soon after, it released another how-to video, "Bush League 101: How to Bush League a Bush League Baseball Team" in which Matt Kirsch applied to be the new mascot for the Modesto Nuts minor league baseball team.
