= Mix 96.7 =

Mix 96.7 is a station identifier that includes the following radio stations:

== Radio stations ==
=== Canada ===
- CILT-FM, in Steinbach, Manitoba
- CHYR-FM, in Leamington, Ontario

=== United States ===
- KHIX, in Carlin, Nevada
- WBVI, in Findlay, Ohio
- WMXA, in Auburn, Alabama
- WLTN-FM, in Lisbon, New Hampshire
- KSYV, in Solvang, California
- WLXV, in Cadillac, Michigan
- WHTQ, in Whiting, Wisconsin

== See also ==
- Mix FM (disambiguation)
