= XHMRT-FM =

Radio station in Tampico, Tamaulipas, Mexico

- Tampico, Tamaulipas; Mexico
- Frequency: 102.5 MHz
- Branding: Radio Oasis Vida

Programming
- Format: Christian talk

Ownership
- Owner: Martha Morales Reséndiz

History
- First air date: 2017
- Call sign meaning: Morales Reséndiz Tampico

Technical information
- Licensing authority: CRT
- Class: A
- ERP: 1.7 kW
- HAAT: 48.9 m (160 ft)
- Transmitter coordinates: 22°15′05.79″N 97°52′32.04″W

Links
- Website: XHMRT-FM on Facebook

XHMRT-FM is a radio station on 102.5 FM in Tampico, Tamaulipas. XHMRT-FM is owned by Martha Morales Resendiz and carries a Christian talk format known as "Radio Oasis Vida".

== History ==
XHMRT-FM received its concession on January 20, 2017, after Morales Reséndiz fought the Federal Telecommunications Institute and its predecessor, the Federal Telecommunications Commission (Cofetel), to obtain the frequency.

On December 16, 2012, Morales Reséndiz filed for a permit for a new noncommercial (permit) radio station on 102.3 MHz in Tampico. In June 2014, the IFT denied the application and others for radio stations, citing that at the 800 kHz separation then used in Mexico, there was no additional room for FM radio stations in Tampico. Morales Reséndiz proceeded to file a juicio de amparo against the federal government in Tamaulipas district court that October. After being transferred to the Specialized Court for Economic Competition, Telecommunications and Broadcasting, the district judge in telecommunications court found in favor of Morales Reséndiz in August 2016. After an appeal filed by the IFT, the appeals section of the telecommunications court upheld the lower court verdict. The ruling found that the guidelines applicable at the time of the filing failed to provide adequate justification for the IFT's denial on technical grounds. As Mexico had earlier that year adopted 400 kHz station spacing, allowing for new stations to be inserted in cities like Tampico, and in compliance with the court's ruling, Morales Reséndiz was awarded her station on 102.5 MHz in January 2017.

XHMRT began transmitting in August 2017 as "Radio Oasis Vida" with Christian talk programming. The station had originally broadcast with 2.7 kW prior to reducing power in 2020.
