= Bobby Bones =

American on-air radio personality (born 1980)

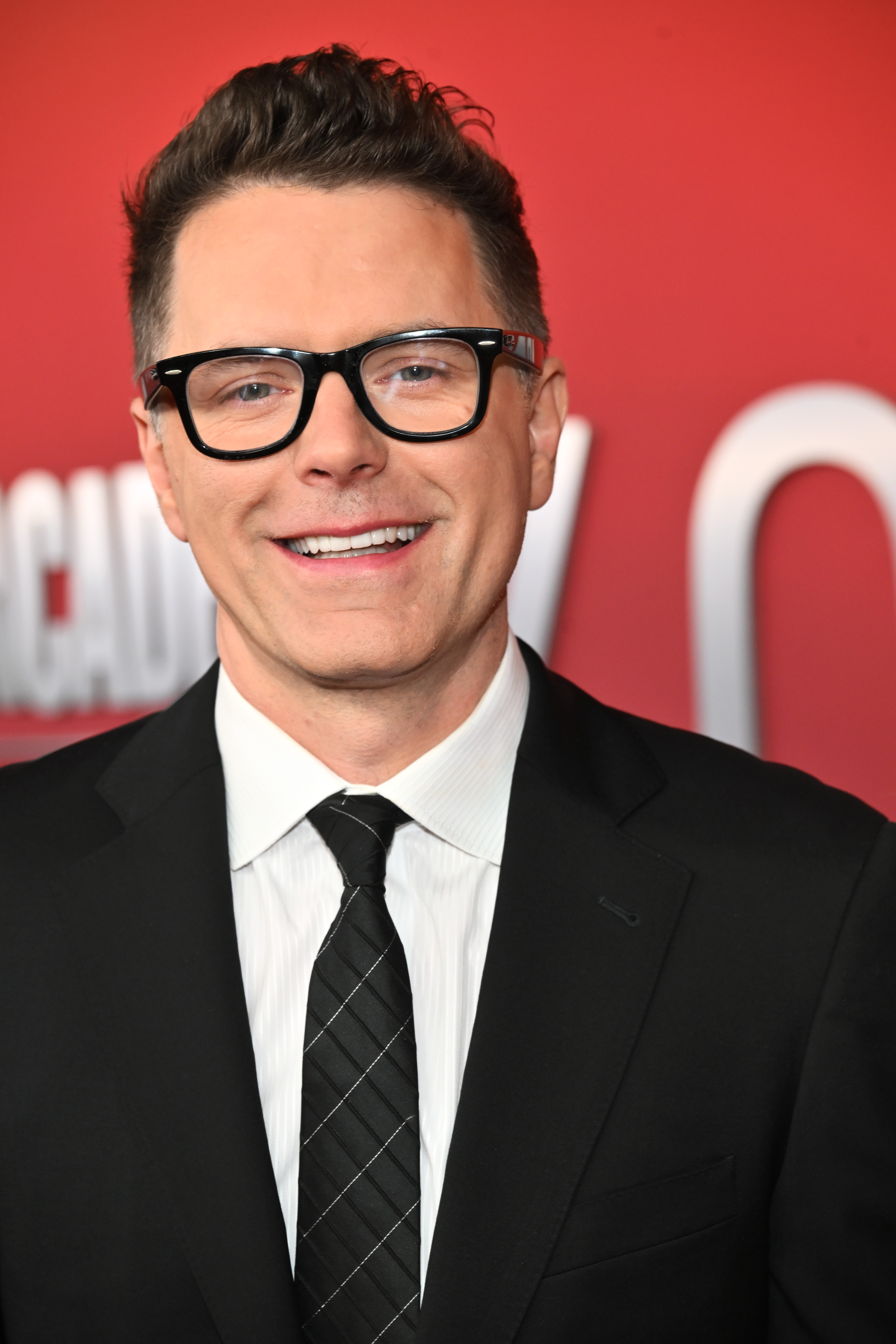
- Bones at the iHeartRadio Theater in NYC, for Brad Paisley's album release party.
- Born: Bobby Estell; April 2, 1980 (age 46); Mountain Pine, Arkansas, U.S.
- Education: Henderson State University
- Occupations: Radio personality, television personality, author, comedian, musician
- Height: 6 ft 1 in (185 cm)
- Spouse: Caitlin Parker (m. 2021)
- Musical career
- Genre: Country
- Instrument: Vocals
- Label: Black River

Bobby Estell (born April 2, 1980), known professionally as Bobby Bones, is an American radio and television personality, best known for hosting the nationally syndicated The Bobby Bones Show, originating from the iHeart Studios in Nashville, TN, and for his role as a full-time mentor on American Idol on ABC. He was the winner of season 27 of Dancing with the Stars with partner Sharna Burgess. He has also written two New York Times best sellers. Bones has also released a number of country music albums through Black River Entertainment.

== Early life and education ==
Bones was born in Hot Springs, Arkansas, on April 2, 1980, and raised in the small community of Mountain Pine, Arkansas. He has said his mother became pregnant with him at age 15, when his father was 17. He was raised by his mother and maternal grandmother. His biological father was with him until the age of five, but then left the family. Bones began dreaming of a radio career around the age of 5. His mother died in 2014 at age 49 after battling addiction problems. He grew up poor, and often viewed radio as a way of escaping poverty. Bones began his radio career at age 17 at the campus station of Henderson State University, KSWH-FM "The Pulse". He graduated with a B.A. in Radio/Television from Henderson in 2002.

== Career ==
While still in college, Bones went to work as a station hand at KLAZ in Hot Springs, Arkansas, but was put on the air within a few days of being hired. A manager there gave him the choice of going on the air as Bobby Z or Bobby Bones of which he chose the latter. Bones' first full-time radio contract paid him $17,000. In 2002, Bones was hired by Q100/KQAR in Little Rock, Arkansas, which led to his hosting The Bobby Bones Show on KHFI-FM in Austin, Texas.

According to The Washington Post, Bones is different from typical radio DJs, as he doesn't have the "classic, booming radio DJ voice". Despite being commonly referred to as such Bones does not refer to himself as a DJ.

=== Austin ===
Bones was originally hired for the evening shift on KHFI-FM and was soon moved to mornings. While in Austin, he met two of his future co-hosts, Lunchbox (in a bar) and Amy (in a Culver's). Bones believed in Amy and put her on the air immediately. His executive producer at the time, Alayna Messer, was previously an intern on the show.

Over ten years, the show built its audience into the top-rated morning show in Austin and was syndicated in a few regional markets. At the height of his popularity, Bones was offered a job outside of radio but ultimately chose to remain with Clear Channel (now iHeart Media).

=== Nashville ===
In 2012, Clear Channel moved Bones and his show from Austin with its Top 40 format to Nashville and a country music format while taking The Bobby Bones Show nationwide. Bones took over the slot hosted by longtime DJ Gerry House, who retired in 2010. Bones now broadcasts from the WSIX-FM studios in Nashville on weekday mornings from 5:00 a.m. to 10 a.m. (CT). His co-host is Amy, and features Producer Eddie, Lunchbox, Raymundo, Mike D., Abby, and Scuba Steve.

The Bobby Bones Show has become a regular interview stop for top country music stars and even artists/celebrities outside the genre of country. Luke Bryan, John Mayer, Taylor Swift, Garth Brooks, Ed Sheeran, Blake Shelton, Tim McGraw, Lady Antebellum, Jason Aldean, Dierks Bentley, and more have been featured in interviews on the morning show.

=== Syndication ===
In February 2013, The Bobby Bones Show was nationally syndicated through iHeart Media-owned Premiere Networks and was made available via iHeartRadio.com and the iHeartRadio mobile app. The show is currently heard on more than 150 radio stations in the U.S., Canada, and UK.

The Bobby Bones Show has an estimated audience of nearly 9.2 million listeners a week.

Bones also hosts the weekly "Country Top 30 with Bobby Bones", carried on over 100 radio stations nationwide.

As part of the iHeart Media family, Bones has hosted, presented, and even performed at the annual iHeartRadio Country Festival held in Austin, Texas, iHeartRadio Music Festival held in Las Vegas, Nevada and the annual iHeartRadio Music Awards in Los Angeles, California.

=== Accidental trigger of Emergency Alert System ===
In October 2014, Bones accidentally triggered the Emergency Alert System by playing EAS tones during an on-air rant about an erroneous EAS test interrupting coverage locally of the 2014 World Series on Fox affiliate WZTV. The EAS tones would have only triggered the EAS issuance in Nashville, but since the show was in syndication, the signal cascaded through the show's nationwide affiliates, and caused AT&T U-verse boxes nationwide to lock up with the erroneous test. In May 2015, Bones's employer iHeartMedia paid a $1 million FCC fine due to the incident and removed all EAS sound effects from their nationwide sound library to prevent a recurrence.

== Other media ==
Bones appeared in the 2009 feature film, Bandslam, with Vanessa Hudgens. He has also appeared on the ABC drama Nashville and has been a guest host with Kelly Ripa on Live! with Regis and Kelly.

In 2012 Bones was part of the Fox Sports Radio lineup, hosting the weekend sports talk program Roddick and Bones with tennis star Andy Roddick, airing Saturdays from 1:00 p.m. to 4:00 p.m. Eastern Time on nearly 300 radio stations.

Bones is also the host of the podcast “The Bobbycast” where he interviews singers/songwriters of all genres which The Washington Post dubbed as a "treasure trove of unusually candid anecdotes." He has also launched his own podcast network, the Nashville Podcast Network.

On May 17, 2016, he released his first book entitled Bare Bones, I'm Not Lonely If You're Reading This Book.

In 2018, Bones was a guest mentor for season sixteen of American Idol (the first to air on ABC) during the top 24 round. On November 6, 2018, it was announced Bones would become a full-time mentor for the series beginning in season seventeen. During an episode which aired April 8, 2019, Bones served as guest host, as host Ryan Seacrest was sick and missed the taping.

In June 2019, Bones filmed an episode of Running Wild with Bear Grylls in Norway. The episode aired on January 14, 2020. He was a judge of Topgolf's original series Who Will Rock You.

He signed an overall deal with BBC Studios.

Breaking Bobby Bones, on the National Geographic Channel began airing in 2021. In each episode, Bones meets a real person doing a "real" job or sport, works with them to learn how to do it, and is critiqued on his performance. At the end of each episode, Bones does something special for week's guest that will improve their life, or help them with their career or other goals.

On December 31, 2021, Bones, along with Rachel Smith of Entertainment Tonight, hosted New Year's Eve Live: Nashville's Big Bash. It was broadcast live from Nashville on CBS.

In 2022, Bones hosted the USA Network competition series Snake in the Grass.

In 2026, Bones appeared on Hell's Kitchen as a chef's table guest diner in the red team's kitchen during Season 25's second dinner service in the episode "Sliding Into Hell".

=== Dancing with the Stars ===
In September 2018, Bones was announced as one of the celebrities to compete on the 27th season of Dancing with the Stars, being paired with the professional dancer Sharna Burgess. Despite the second lowest scores for a couple in the final 4, the couple made it to the finals, and ended up winning the competition.

Week #	Dance/Song	Judges' score			Total	Result
Week #	Dance/Song	Inaba	Goodman	Tonioli	Total	Result
1	Jive / "T-R-O-U-B-L-E"	7	6	7	20	Safe
2	Foxtrot / "Theme from New York, New York"; Quickstep / "That Old Black Magic"	7; 7	6; 6	7; 6	20; 19	Safe
3	Contemporary / "A Million Dreams"	8	7	8	23	Safe
4	Trio Cha-cha-cha / "U Can't Touch This"	7	6	7	20	Safe
5	Waltz / "Part of Your World"	7	7	7	21	No Elimination
6	Argentine Tango / "Mr. Sandman"	8	7	7	22	Safe
7	Viennese Waltz / "Can't Help Falling in Love"; Team Freestyle / "9 to 5"	8; 10	8; 9	8; 10	24; 29	Safe
8 Semifinals	Salsa / "G.D.F.R."; Jive / "Gimme Some Lovin'"	7; 8	7; 8	7; 8	21; 24	Safe
9 Finals	Cha-cha-cha / "U Can't Touch This"; Freestyle / "The Greatest Show"	8; 10	8; 10	8; 10	24; 30	Winner

== Personal life ==
On September 28, 2013, Bones and his crew were part of a team that set the Guinness World Record "Most hunger relief meals packaged in one hour (team)".

On August 5, 2015, during the 2016 presidential campaign of Donald Trump, Bones filed an "all purpose" trademark application with the United States Patent and Trademark Office for the rights to the phrase "Make America Great Again". Trump had registered the phrase for "political action committee services" but not for its use on hats, t-shirts, duffel bags, and other apparel and accessories that Bones now had the rights to. Two days later, on August 7, Bones tweeted, "hey @realDonaldTrump, if you donate 100k to @stjude, I will give you your clothing trademark back. thanks! – Bobby". Bones later tweeted an image on October 29 of a check from The Trump Organization for an undisclosed amount, stating it would go to St. Jude Children's Research Hospital and that Trump could "have [his] slogan back".

On January 3, 2017, Bones announced he was considering a run for governor of Arkansas in the 2018 election. On March 14, 2017, Bones announced he was not running.

In July 2021, Bones married Caitlin Parker.

== Awards and honors ==
For four years running, from 2004 to 2008, Bones was named Best Radio Personality by the Austin Music Awards, presented by The Austin Chronicle and SXSW. The Bobby Bones Show also won Best Radio Program 2007–2008. On April 6, 2014, Bones, Amy, and Lunchbox won their first Academy of Country Music Award for National On-Air Personality of the Year, just nine months into Bones's first year in country music. Bones became the youngest ever inductee into the National Radio Hall of Fame during a ceremony on November 2, 2017, at the Museum of Broadcast Communications in Chicago. The University of Arkansas awarded Bobby with an honorary doctorate at their Spring 2022 commencement ceremonies.

== Bobby Bones and the Raging Idiots discography ==
=== Studio albums ===
Title	Album details	Peak chart positions				Sales
Title	Album details	US Country	US	US Comedy	US Indie	Sales
The Critics Give It 5 Stars	Release date: March 18, 2016; Label: Black River Entertainment	4	41	1	3	US: 12,700

=== Extended plays ===
Title	Album details	Peak chart positions		
Title	Album details	US	US Kid	US Indie
The Raging Kidiots: Kiddy Up	Release date: November 2, 2015; Label: Black River Entertainment	64	3	2
The Next Episode	Release date: August 18, 2017			

=== Other charted songs ===
Year	Single	Peak positions		Album
Year	Single	US Country Airplay	US Comedy Digital	Album
2016	"We Can't Stand Each Other" (with Carrie Underwood)	—	8	The Critics Give It 5 Stars
2016	"Every Day Is a Good Day"	—	10	The Critics Give It 5 Stars
2016	"Starbucks!"	—	14	The Critics Give It 5 Stars
2016	"Fishin' with My Dad"	60	20	The Critics Give It 5 Stars
2017	"Namaste"	—	1	The Next Episode
2017	"Chick-Fil-a (... But It's Sunday)"	—	3	The Next Episode
"—" denotes releases that did not chart

=== Music videos ===
Year	Video	Director
2016	"If I Was Your Boyfriend"	Robert Chavers
