= KXSF-LP =

- San Francisco, California; United States
- Frequencies: 102.5 MHz; (shared time with KSFP-LP)

Programming
- Format: Community radio

Ownership
- Owner: San Francisco Community Radio, Inc.

History
- First air date: September 10, 2018

Technical information
- Licensing authority: FCC
- Facility ID: 192498
- ERP: 2 watts
- HAAT: 272.395 m (893.68 ft)
- Transmitter coordinates: 37°45′19″N 122°27′10″W

Links
- Public license information: LMS
- Webcast: Listen live
- Website: kxsf.fm

KXSF-LP (102.5 FM) is a low-power community radio station in San Francisco, California. It is owned by San Francisco Community Radio, Inc., sharing the frequency with KSFP-LP, the station of the SF Public Press. It broadcasts from 10 a.m. to 4 p.m. and 10 p.m. to 4 a.m. from Light Rail Studio in San Francisco. KXSF-LP and KSFP-LP are broadcast from the second level of Sutro Tower.

== History ==
In 2013, San Francisco Community Radio filed an application with the Federal Communications Commission for a new low-power station to serve San Francisco. The group was formed by former DJs and staff members of KUSF, the former freeform station of the University of San Francisco, which was sold in 2011 and changed formats. The DJs created "KUSF in Exile", which grew into San Francisco Community Radio.

KXSF-LP began broadcasting on September 10, 2018, with a launch lineup including 30 different programs. The frequency is shared with KSFP-LP, which specializes in talk and public affairs programming.
