= WBIW =

- Bedford, Indiana; United States
- Broadcast area: Bedford, IN area
- Frequency: 1340 kHz
- Branding: 1340 AM WBIW

Programming
- Format: News Talk Information
- Affiliations: Fox News Radio, Premiere Radio Networks, Westwood One

Ownership
- Owner: Ad-Venture Media/Mitchell Broadcasting
- Sister stations: WQRK, WPHZ

History
- First air date: 1948

Technical information
- Licensing authority: FCC
- Facility ID: 438
- Class: C
- ERP: 1,000 watts unlimited
- Transmitter coordinates: 38°52′23.00″N 86°28′34.00″W

Links
- Public license information: Public file; LMS
- Website: wbiw.com

WBIW (1340 AM) is a radio station broadcasting a News Talk Information format. Licensed to Bedford, Indiana, United States, the station serves the Bloomington area. The station is currently owned by Ad-Venture Media, Inc. and features programming from Fox News Radio, Premiere Radio Networks and Westwood One.

The station began broadcasting in 1948 under the full-service format, playing a variety of music along with local and national news and sports programs. In the 1980s, the music switched to exclusively country music, and the format changed again in the mid-1990s to oldies.

Not long after WQRK's switch from AOR to oldies in 1999, WBIW began phasing out music programming and disc jockeys in favor of syndicated talk shows such as those from Rush Limbaugh and Dr. Laura Schlessinger. An interactive morning show and local news are still presented locally along with a multitude of talk and specialty programming throughout the week.

1340 AM WBIW has long broadcast high-school football and basketball events. It has carried Bedford North Lawrence Stars games since the school was opened in 1975; prior to that, the station aired many games from the seven Lawrence County high schools that were consolidated into BNL. Local personality Myron Rainey has been the voice of the BNL Stars since 1980, and he continues on the broadcasts as of 2010–11.

1340 AM WBIW also carries Indianapolis Colts football, Indiana Pacers basketball, NFL Football, NCAA Football, Purdue University sports as well as IndyCar Series racing and the Indianapolis 500.
