= WQRK =

- Bedford, Indiana; United States
- Broadcast area: Bedford, Indiana
- Frequency: 105.5 MHz
- Branding: WQRK 105.5

Programming
- Format: Classic hits
- Affiliations: Fox News Radio

Ownership
- Owner: Ad-Venture Media/Mitchell Broadcasting
- Sister stations: WBIW, WPHZ

History
- First air date: 1975

Technical information
- Licensing authority: FCC
- Facility ID: 437
- Class: A
- ERP: 2,000 watts
- HAAT: 122 meters (400 ft)
- Transmitter coordinates: 38°54′29.00″N 86°28′28.00″W

Links
- Public license information: Public file; LMS
- Webcast: Listen Live
- Website: www.wqrk.com

WQRK (105.5 FM) is a radio station broadcasting a classic hits music format. Licensed to Bedford, Indiana, United States, the station serves the Bloomington, Indiana area. The station is currently owned by Ad-Venture Media, Inc. and features programming such as Casey Kasem. And a morning show hosted by Sean Duncan
