= Mix FM =

Mix FM may refer to:

== Radio stations ==
=== Armenia ===
- Mix FM (Stepanakert) (105.0), Stepanakert, Karabakh

=== Australia ===
- 92.7 Mix FM, Maroochydore, Queensland
- Mix 94.5, Perth, Western Australia
- Mix 101.1, a defunct adult contemporary radio station in Melbourne, now KIIS 101.1
- Mix 102.3, Adelaide
- Mix 104.9, Darwin, Northern Territory
- Mix 106.3, Canberra
- Mix 106.5, a defunct adult contemporary radio station in Sydney, now KIIS 106.5
- Mix FM Townsville (106.3 FM), a defunct radio station in Townsville, now Star 106.3

=== Brazil ===
- Mix FM (Brazil), a Brazilian CHR radio network

=== Canada ===
- Mix FM (Ottawa) (91.9), Ottawa, Ontario
- CJPG-FM (Mix 96.5), Portage la Prairie, Manitoba
- CILT-FM (Mix 96.7), Steinbach, Manitoba

=== Cyprus ===
- Mix FM Cyprus (102.3 & 90.8), Limassol

=== Fiji ===
- Mix FM (Fiji) (93.8 & 93.6)

=== Latvia ===
- Mix 102.7, Riga

=== Lebanon ===
- Mix FM Lebanon (104.4 & 104.7 FM), Beirut

=== Malaysia ===
- Mix (Malaysian radio station)

=== Philippines ===
- DXMX (105.9 Mix FM), a defunct FM radio station in Davao City
- DYOT (MiX FM Oton), a Manila Broadcasting Company station

=== Portugal ===
- Mix FM (Portugal), a defunct Portuguese radio station

=== United Kingdom ===
- Mix 96 (Aylesbury), Buckinghamshire, England
- Mix 107, High Wycombe, Buckinghamshire, England

=== United States ===
- WHLK (formerly branded Mix 106.5) in Cleveland, Ohio
- KAMX (Mix 94.7) in Austin, Texas
- KMGE (formerly Magic 94.5, now Mix FM 94.5) in Eugene, Oregon
- KHIX (Mix 96.7) in Carlin, Nevada
- KDMX (Mix 102.9) in Dallas, Texas
- KHMX (Mix 96.5) in Houston, Texas
- KMXB (Mix 94.1) in Las Vegas, Nevada
- KMXG (Mix 96) in the Quad Cities area of Iowa and Illinois.
- KONA-FM (Mix 105.3) in Kennewick, Washington
- KMXP (Mix 96.9) in Phoenix, Arizona
- KMXZ-FM (Mix 94.9) in Tucson, Arizona
- KRAV-FM (Mix 96) in Tulsa, Oklahoma
- KXXM (Mix 96.1) in San Antonio, Texas
- KYMX (Mix 96) in Sacramento, California
- WBVI (Mix 96.7) in Findlay, Ohio
- WWBX (Mix 104.1) in Boston, Massachusetts
- WEIU (FM) (Hit Mix 88.9) in Charleston, Illinois
- WFMX (Mix 107.9) in Skowhegan, Maine
- WFTN-FM (Mix 94.1) in Franklin, New Hampshire
- WKJX (Mix 96) in Elizabeth City, North Carolina
- WLXR (FM) (Mix 96.1) in Tomah, Wisconsin
- WMXA (Mix 96.7) in Auburn, Alabama
- WMXD (Mix 92.3) in Detroit, Michigan
- WMXW (Mix 103.3) in Binghamton, New York
- Mix (XM), XM satellite radio channel
- WMGI (100.7 MIX FM) in Terre Haute, Indiana
- WMNP (99.3 FM MIXX 993) in Newport, Rhode Island
- WWKL (FM) (formerly branded Mix 106.7) in Camp Hill, Pennsylvania
- WWMX (Mix 106.5) in Baltimore, Maryland

== See also ==
- Mixx FM (disambiguation)
