= XHHIH-FM =

Radio station in Ojinaga, Chihuahua

- Ojinaga, Chihuahua; Mexico
- Broadcast area: Ojinaga, Chihuahua; Presidio, Texas
- Frequency: 102.5 FM
- Branding: La Ley

Programming
- Format: Regional Mexican

Ownership
- Owner: Sistema Radio Lobo; (José Gerardo López de la Rocha)

History
- First air date: October 10, 1988 (concession)
- Call sign meaning: CHIHuahua

Technical information
- Licensing authority: CRT
- Class: B
- ERP: 9.53 kW
- HAAT: 1.6 m (5 ft 3 in)
- Transmitter coordinates: 29°32′52″N 104°23′35″W

Links
- Webcast: Listen live
- Website: laley102.fm

XHHIH-FM is a radio station on 102.5 FM in Ojinaga, Chihuahua, Mexico. The station is owned by Sistema Radio Lobo and carries a Regional Mexican format known as La Ley.

== History ==
XHHIH was awarded to Amalia Guadalupe Quiñones Armendáriz on October 10, 1988. López de la Rocha became concessionaire in 2006.
