= XHRPA-FM =

Radio station in Morelia, Michoacán

- Morelia, Michoacán; Mexico
- Frequency: 102.5 FM
- Branding: Radio Ranchito

Programming
- Format: Regional Mexican

Ownership
- Owner: Ultra; (Dígalo Cantando, S.A. de C.V.)

History
- First air date: December 13, 1966 (concession)

Technical information
- ERP: 25 kW
- Transmitter coordinates: 19°42′46″N 101°15′16″W

Links
- Website: www.radioranchito.com.mx

XHRPA-FM is a radio station on 102.5 FM in Morelia, Michoacán. It is owned by Ultra and is known as Radio Ranchito with a Regional Mexican format.

== History ==
XEQB-AM 1240 received its concession on December 13, 1966, to Radio Televisión de Morelia, S.A. Within just a few years, the call sign was changed to XERPA-AM. The station was owned by Grupo ACIR in the 1980s. It started broadcasting with 500 watts, later increased to 1,000 and, by the end of the AM era, 5,000 watts daytime.

XERPA was cleared to migrate to FM in 2011.
