= XHUAN-FM =

Radio station in Tijuana, Baja California, Mexico

- Tijuana, Baja California; Mexico
- Frequency: 102.5 MHz
- Branding: Fusión 102.5

Programming
- Format: Public radio

Ownership
- Owner: Instituto Mexicano de la Radio

History
- First air date: August 1, 1986
- Former call signs: XHCPDJ-FM (2023)
- Call sign meaning: From "Tijuana"

Technical information
- Licensing authority: CRT
- Class: B
- ERP: 32,790 watts
- HAAT: 71 m (233 ft)
- Transmitter coordinates: 32°29′14″N 116°59′20″W

Links
- Webcast: Listen Live
- Website: imer.mx/fusion

XHUAN-FM (102.5 FM Fusión 102.5) is a public radio station licensed to Tijuana, Baja California, owned by IMER (Instituto Mexicano de la Radio), Mexico's public radio network. Like the public radio stations in the United States, IMER presents a variety of discussion and music programs.

XHUAN used to broadcast in HD.

== History ==
XHUAN signed on in the summer of 1986, carrying matches from the 1986 FIFA World Cup and music programming. It formally launched on August 1, 1986, and it held an inauguration ceremony on January 27, 1987, attended by President Miguel de la Madrid. That same year, the station launched its own newscast, Enlace FM.

In 1990 the station flipped to a ranchera music format, maintaining some old programs and the newscast; this format was dropped two years later, with a return to the wide-ranging format as "Estéreo Frontera". In the mid-1990s, the local newscast was canceled and the format changed to grupera music; this lasted until 2002, when the station yet again returned to its public mixed format. The current Fusión format was introduced in 2006, focusing the station on jazz music, news and community programming.

The concession for XHUAN-FM lapsed effective April 13, 2023, due to failure to file a timely renewal. The Federal Telecommunications Institute granted a new concession, which initially bore the template call sign XHCPDJ-FM, which was changed back to XHUAN-FM along with those for five other stations whose concessions were lapsed and reawarded.
