= Mixx FM =

Mixx FM may refer to:

- Mixx FM branded radio stations of Ace Radio, in Melbourne, Australia
- DWLV-FM, a radio station in Naga City, Philippines

== See also ==
- Mix FM (disambiguation)
