= XHES-FM =

Radio station in Chihuahua, Chihuahua, Mexico

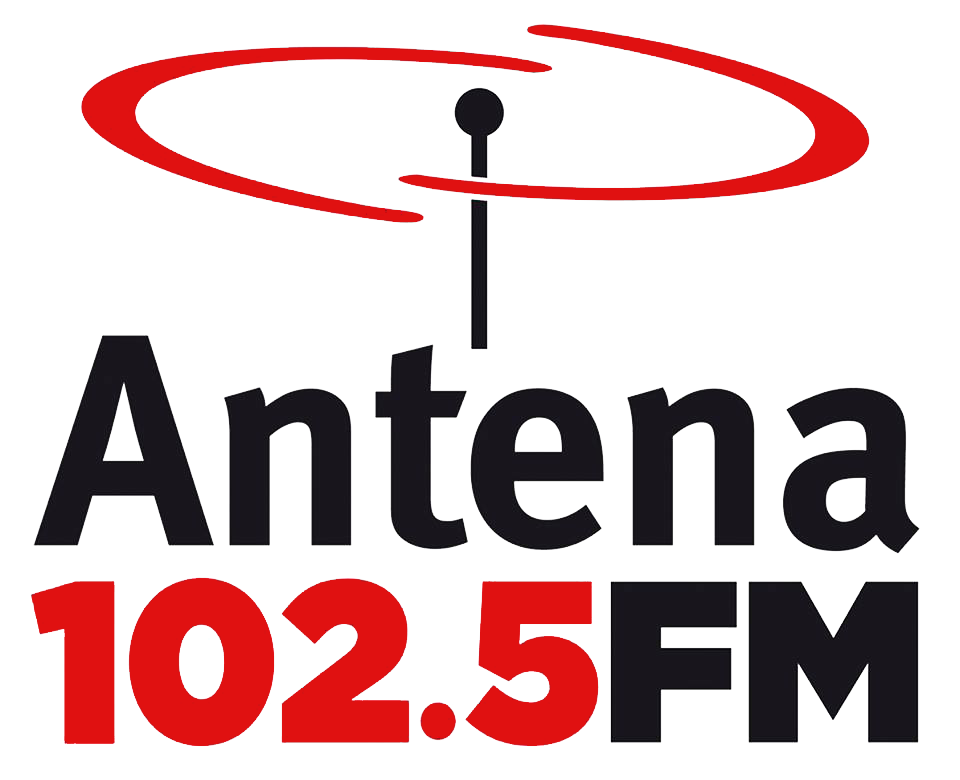
- Chihuahua City, Chihuahua; Mexico
- Frequency: 102.5 FM
- Branding: Antena 102.5 FM

Programming
- Format: News/talk

Ownership
- Owner: GRD Multimedia; (Radio Impulsora X.E.E.S., S.A.)

History
- First air date: December 17, 1976 (concession)

Technical information
- Licensing authority: CRT
- Class: B1
- ERP: 25,000 watts
- HAAT: 36.2 m (119 ft)
- Transmitter coordinates: 28°41′27″N 106°07′15.3″W

Links
- Webcast: Listen live
- Website: antenafm.mx

XHES-FM is a radio station in Chihuahua City, Chihuahua, Mexico. Broadcasting on 102.5 FM, XHES is owned by GRD Multimedia and carries a news/talk format known as Antena 102.5 FM.

== History ==
XHES received its concession on December 17, 1976 as XEES-AM 1110 (later 760). It migrated to FM in 2011.
