= KSWH-LP =

Radio station at Henderson State University in Arkadelphia, Arkansas

- Arkadelphia, Arkansas; United States
- Broadcast area: Clark County, Arkansas
- Frequency: 102.5 MHz
- Branding: The Pulse 102.5

Programming
- Format: College

Ownership
- Owner: Henderson State University Foundation

History
- First air date: September 5, 1969 (Note: On the earlier KSWH-FM license. The low-power FM license was activated in 2004.)
- Former frequencies: 99.9 MHz (2003–2014)

Technical information
- Licensing authority: FCC
- Facility ID: 134820
- Class: L1
- ERP: 100 watts
- HAAT: 30 meters (98 feet)
- Transmitter coordinates: 34°07′44″N 93°03′37″W

Links
- Public license information: LMS
- Website: KSWH-LP Online

KSWH-LP (102.5 FM, "The Pulse 102.5") was a college radio station licensed to serve Arkadelphia, Arkansas. The station was owned by the Henderson State University Foundation.

The station was assigned the KSWH-LP call sign by the Federal Communications Commission on September 15, 2003. However, it traces its history to a full-service, but even lower-power, license on 91.1 MHz.

== History ==
=== KSWH-FM ===
On November 19, 1968, then–Henderson State College filed with the Federal Communications Commission to build a new, 10-watt Class D educational radio station on 88.1 MHz in Arkadelphia. The application was approved on March 21, 1969; on September 5, KSWH signed on the air. Two years later, it moved to 91.1 MHz. An early 1980s bid to upgrade power to 6,460 watts was abandoned by 1985.

=== KSWH-LP ===
Into the 2000s, KSWH-FM still broadcast with 10 watts. In 2001, Henderson State University filed for a construction permit to build a new low-power FM radio station, with up to 100 watts of effective radiated power. The application was approved in 2003, and in 2004, the KSWH operation moved from 91.1 to 99.9. The KSWH-FM Class D license was not surrendered until 2014.

The station was issued a license to move from 99.9 MHz to 102.5 MHz on April 2, 2014. The change had been made on March 7 after adjacent-channel KWPS-FM in Caddo Valley notified KSWH-LP that it was interfering; the commercial station provided assistance through the frequency change.

On May 25, 2023, the Henderson State University Foundation informed the FCC that it would cease operating the station on May 26 and either assign it to a local entity or surrender it for cancellation, noting, "Henderson State University Foundation no longer wishes to operate a radio station." The Foundation surrendered KSWH-LP's license to the FCC on December 5, and the FCC cancelled it on December 6.

== Alumni ==
- Bobby Bones, radio morning show host
