= WGLU =

- Warner Robins, Georgia; United States
- Broadcast area: Macon, Georgia
- Frequency: 102.5 MHz

Programming
- Format: Christian Music
- Network: K-Love

Ownership
- Owner: Educational Media Foundation

History
- Former call signs: WHRH (1991–1993); WYIQ (1993–1997); WLCG-FM (1997–2002); WELV-FM (2002–2004); WEBL (2004–2008); WZCH (2008–2020)

Technical information
- Licensing authority: FCC
- Facility ID: 29129
- Class: A
- ERP: 4,000 watts
- HAAT: 100 meters
- Transmitter coordinates: 32°34′20″N 83°40′13″W
- Translator: (91.9 MHz) W220EP (Warner Robins)

Links
- Public license information: Public file; LMS
- Webcast: http://www.klove.com/listen/
- Website: http://www.klove.com/

WGLU (102.5 FM) is a Christian radio station that is an affiliate of K-LOVE. The station is owned by Educational Media Foundation. WGLU was a simulcast of sister station WPCH (96.5 FM). This station was assigned the WGLU call letters by the Federal Communications Commission on December 15, 2020.

== History ==
=== History as Peach ===
On the week of March 17, 2008, fans of the "Peach 96.5" were told that they can listen to the station online until the station returned to the air as "Peach 102.5" on March 24, 2008. During this week, a country format known as "96.5 The Bull" broadcast on both the 102.5 and 96.5 frequencies. "The Peach" returned to return to the air on its new frequency at 102.5 on March 24, 2008. Prior to this, the station aired a Spanish format.

On September 15, 2008, the country format at 96.5 as "96.5 The Bull" was removed and replaced with a Peach simulcast of 102.5 and 96.5. This was the second time that "The Peach" has aired at 96.5. With the simulcast, the then-WZCH at 102.5 covered Warner-Robins clearly, while WPCH covered Macon and surrounding areas clearly. Unlike when it aired only on 96.5 or 102.5, "The Peach" could now be heard clearly throughout the whole Macon/Warner-Robins area.

On March 22, 2011, the station broke away from the simulcast on 96.5. The new format was announced at 4 PM on Friday, March 25, 2011. Since breaking away from the 96.5 simulcast, 102.5 started playing various formats before finally deciding on a country format. They were then known as New Country 102.5.

The country format proved to be a failure from the start when on September 29, 2011, Clear Channel Communications announced that they were selling WZCH to the Educational Media Foundation and would be affiliated with K-Love, a station that plays Christian music. The new format started not long after that date.
