= IHeartRadio Country Festival =

Country music festival held in Austin, Texas

iHeartRadio Country Festival
- Genre: Country
- Locations: Moody Center, Austin, Texas
- Years active: 2014–present
- Founders: iHeartRadio (iHeartMedia, Inc.)
- Website: iheartradio.com/countryfestival/

The iHeartCountry Festival is an annual music event by iHeartRadio that celebrates country music with performances by the genre's biggest superstars at the Moody Center in Austin, Texas. The inaugural event in 2014 was not broadcast on national television, while the 2015 edition was broadcast on NBC. The 2016 and 2017 editions aired as a special on the AT&T AUDIENCE Network. The 2018 edition aired on Fox. Since 2019 it has streamed exclusively on Hulu and has been simulcast on Disney+ since 2026.

== Line-ups ==
=== 2014 ===
The 2014 iHeartRadio Country Festival took place on March 29, 2014. The event included performances by: Luke Bryan, Jason Aldean, Eric Church, Carrie Underwood, Lady Antebellum, Florida Georgia Line, Hunter Hayes, and Jake Owen.

=== 2015 ===
The 2015 iHeartRadio Country Festival took place on May 2, 2015, and featured performances by: Tim McGraw, Brad Paisley, Rascal Flatts, Darius Rucker, Little Big Town, Dierks Bentley, Brantley Gilbert, Justin Moore, and The Band Perry.

NBC televised the iHeartRadio Country Festival on Wednesday, May 27, 2015. The all-star Country event was also streamed live exclusively on Yahoo Live and was broadcast live on iHeartMedia's Country radio stations across the U.S.

=== 2016 ===
The 2016 iHeartCountry Festival took place on April 30, 2016, and featured performances by: Lee Brice, Keith Urban, Brett Eldredge, Chris Young, Sam Hunt, Miranda Lambert, Florida Georgia Line, Zac Brown Band, Thomas Rhett and Cole Swindell. Tickets went on sale on January 15, 2016.

The iHeartCountry Festival aired on the AT&T AUDIENCE Network on May 13, 2016. The event streamed live on iHeartRadio.com/WatchATT and on iHeartMedia's Country radio stations across the U.S.

=== 2017 ===
The 2017 iHeartCountry Festival, A Music Experience by AT&T took place on May 6, 2017, and featured performances by: Jason Aldean, Little Big Town, Dierks Bentley, Brantley Gilbert, Rascal Flatts, Jake Owen, Lady Antebellum and Kelsea Ballerini.

The iHeartCountry Festival, A Music Experience by AT&T aired on the AT&T AUDIENCE Network on May 19, 2017. The star-studded event was streamed live on iHeartRadio.com/WatchATT and was broadcast nationwide on iHeartMedia's Country radio stations across the U.S.

=== 2018 ===
The 2018 iHeartCountry Festival took place on May 5, 2018, with a lineup of Luke Bryan, Keith Urban, Maren Morris, Sugarland, Jon Pardi, and Luke Combs.

=== 2019 ===
The 2019 IHeartCountry Festival took place May 4, 2019 and featured performances by: Tim McGraw, Florida Georgia Line, Dan + Shay, Lauren Alaina, Chris Janson and Little Big Town.

== See also ==
- iHeartRadio Music Awards
- iHeartRadio Music Festival
- iHeartRadio Fiesta Latina, a spin-off to the iHeartRadio Music Festival
