= KUAK-LP =

Bismarck, North Dakota; United States
- Frequency: 102.5 MHz
- Branding: Radio Access 102.5

Programming
- Format: Variety

Ownership
- Owner: Dakota Media Access

History
- Former call signs: KDAK-LP (2014–2018)

Technical information
- Licensing authority: FCC
- Facility ID: 196087
- Class: L1
- ERP: 19 watts
- HAAT: 65 metres (213 ft)
- Transmitter coordinates: 46°49′38″N 100°46′27.50″W

Links
- Public license information: LMS
- Webcast: Listen Live
- Website: Official Website

KUAK-LP (102.5 FM) is a radio station licensed to serve the community of Bismarck, North Dakota. The station is owned by Dakota Media Access. It airs a variety radio format.

The station was assigned the call sign KDAK-LP by the Federal Communications Commission on February 11, 2014. The station changed its call sign to KUAK-LP on October 2, 2018.
