= WPHZ =

- Orleans, Indiana; United States
- Broadcast area: Bedford, Indiana
- Frequency: 102.5 MHz
- Branding: 102.5 Lite FM

Programming
- Format: Adult Contemporary
- Affiliations: Fox News Radio

Ownership
- Owner: Ad-Venture Media/Mitchell Broadcasting
- Sister stations: WQRK, WBIW

History
- First air date: 1988 (as WOTS)
- Former call signs: WOTS (1988–1992); WWEG (1992–2004); WNUF (2004–2005); WQRJ (2005–2007)

Technical information
- Licensing authority: FCC
- Facility ID: 43248
- Class: A
- ERP: 6,000 watts
- HAAT: 86 meters (282 ft)
- Transmitter coordinates: 38°38′16.00″N 86°27′11.00″W

Links
- Public license information: Public file; LMS
- Webcast: Listen live
- Website: 1025litefm.com

WPHZ 102.5 Lite FM is an FM radio station broadcasting an adult contemporary music format. Licensed to Orleans, Indiana, United States. The station is currently owned by Mitchell Community Broadcast Company and includes news programming from Fox News Radio.

== History ==
The station was assigned the call sign WOTS on 1988-10-20. On 1992-06-16, the station changed its call sign to WWEG, on 2004-04-01 to WNUF, on 2005-01-01 to WQRJ, and on 2007-01-01 to the current WPHZ.

On January 1, 2019, WPHZ changed their format from active rock (after a few weeks of Christmas music) to adult contemporary, branded as "Lite FM 102.5". Currently broadcasts Intelligence for Your Life: The John Tesh Radio Show in the mornings, and also the Delilah After Dark Adult contemporary Form at night. All of these are centered around the music they play.

== Former shows ==
- Insert Morning Show Title Here
- hardDriveXL
- Homespun Edge
- Racing Rocks
- Rockline
