= XHUTT-FM =

Radio station of the Universidad Tecnológica de Tabasco in Villahermosa, Tabasco

Villahermosa, Tabasco; Mexico
- Frequency: 102.5 MHz
- Branding: Sintonía UTTAB

Programming
- Format: Mexican college

Ownership
- Owner: Universidad Tecnológica de Tabasco

History
- First air date: September 3, 2013
- Call sign meaning: Universidad Tecnológica de Tabasco

Technical information
- Class: A
- ERP: 2.86 kW
- HAAT: 32.74 m

Links
- Website: uttab.edu.mx/radio/sintonia

XHUTT-FM is a Mexican college radio station owned by the Universidad Tecnológica de Tabasco in Villahermosa, in Mexico. The station broadcasts on 102.5 MHz and is known as Sintonía UTTAB.

== History ==
XHUTT came on the air September 3, 2013, broadcasting with 812 watts. In March 2018, XHUTT increased its power to 2,860 watts.
