= CJFX-FM =

Radio station in Antagonish, Nova Scotia

Coordinates: 45°41′17″N 62°07′00″W

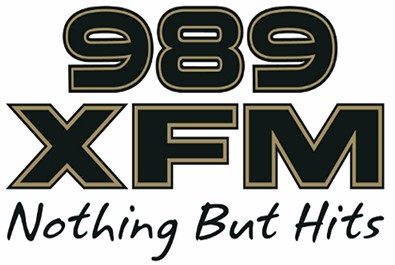
- Antigonish, Nova Scotia; Canada
- Broadcast area: Antigonish County
- Frequency: 98.9 MHz
- Branding: 98.9 XFM

Programming
- Format: Adult contemporary

Ownership
- Owner: Atlantic Broadcasters Ltd.

History
- First air date: March 25, 1943
- Former frequencies: 580 kHz (1943–2003)
- Call sign meaning: FX for Francis Xavier

Technical information
- Class: C1
- ERP: 75,390 watts
- HAAT: 208.9 metres (685 ft)
- Repeaters: 102.5 Inverness; 102.5 Pleasant Bay

Links
- Webcast: Listen Live
- Website: 989xfm.ca

CJFX-FM is a Canadian radio station broadcasting at 98.9 FM in Antigonish, Nova Scotia. The station also broadcasts at 102.5 FM in Inverness. The station has been broadcasting since March 25, 1943. The station is owned & operated by Atlantic Broadcasting Co. Ltd. and currently broadcasts an adult contemporary format branded as 98.9 X-FM with the current slogan "Nothing But Hits".

== History ==
CJFX began broadcasting on March 25, 1943, and continued on-air at 580 on the AM dial for sixty years. CJFX was a pioneer in broadcasting educational programming and live music in its early years, while boasting strong community support for its radio content, including pop, rock, country, celtic and traditional music. While on 580, it was a variety station (country, pop, rock, celtic etc.). The 98.9 FM signal first went on the air in 1998 in order to correct coverage issues with the AM signal and rebroadcast the AM programming. In 2003, CJFX was authorized to make 98.9 FM the main signal, increase its power and simulcast its programming on 580 AM for ninety days. At this time, CJFX changed its on-air branding to 98.9 X-FM with an adult contemporary music format.

The more powerful FM signal was implemented in early 2003 and the AM 580 signal was shut down for good in June of that year. Over the next few years, the station's music format had become more of a hybrid mainstream adult contemporary/hot adult contemporary sound. In recent years, the station began to add classic hits.

CJFX also operates a transmitter located in Inverness at 102.5 FM in order to correct coverage issues that were being created as a result of the AM transmitter being shut down. In 2007, CJFX was authorized by the CRTC to operate another transmitter located in Pleasant Bay in order to correct coverage problems in the area due to the mountainous terrain that hinders both the main 98.9 FM and 102.5 FM signal from Inverness. The area once received a strong signal from the old AM 580 frequency but lost its strong coverage when the AM signal shut down. When the AM stations from Prince Edward Island were shut down, Pleasant Bay was left without strong commercial radio service. In March 2013, CJFX rebranded to 98.9 The Nish but reverted to its former "X-FM" branding after a few short months.
