= Radijojo =

Radijojo World Children's Radio Network (in brief: Radijojo) is a global non-profit initiative empowering children to use radio and the internet as tools for global learning and cultural exchange. Radijojo is a Germany-based NGO cooperating with schools, community radios, education, and youth and culture organizations worldwide. Radijojo was founded in 2002 by German sociologist and media manager Thomas Röhlinger (MBA).

Radijojo's content is produced “by the children, for the children". All programming is free of advertising and offered to schools and community radios worldwide without cost.

Radijojo World Children's Radio Network has established educational and participative projects in countries such as Afghanistan, India, Sierra Leone, Russia, Kyrgyzstan, Thailand, Brazil, New Zealand, Australia, China, Chile, Ghana, Tanzania, and Namibia. Radijojo has also established "Across the Ocean," the first transatlantic children's radio platform connecting kids in the U.S., Canada, and Europe.

In Europe, Radijojo has established the first European Children's Radio EUCHIRA. The EU Commission, the International Association of Journalists, and Internews have given awards to Radijojo as one of the top thirty projects in Europe in the field of media and diversity. Awards have also come from UNICEF in New York and the Federal Government of Germany. A patron for Radijojo's European chapter EUCHIRA is the former German Chancellor, Angela Merkel; another patron for Radijojo is the conductor Daniel Barenboim. Further, Radijojo is member of the World Association of Community Radios (AMARC).

Radijojo partners with organizations like UNESCO, UNICEF, One Laptop Per Child, Pacifica Radio, and a network of young producers within the Public Radio Exchange, Generation PRX.

== Awards ==
2014 United Nations Decade of Education for Sustainable Development, Official Project 2014, 2013/2012 and 2010/2011

2013 Children's Media Prize of the Federal Agency for Civic Education

2012 WSYA - World Summit Youth Award 2012

2012 Goldene Göre - Deutschen Kinderhilfswerks

2011 Member of the UNAOC - World Intercultural Facility for Innovation (WIFI)

2011 Bildungsidee 2011/2012, Federal Ministry of Education and Research, Germany

2010 Media Prize Development Policy of Federal Ministry for Economic Cooperation and Development

2009-2010 UNICEF New York - ICDB Regional Award

== Websites ==
- https://web.archive.org/web/20090312010530/http://www.world-childrens-radio.net/
- http://www.global-radio-kids.org
- http://www.across-the-ocean.org
- http://www.euchira.eu
- http://www.radijojo.de
