= Radio Astra =

Radio Astra (Ράδιο Άστρα)

Nicosia; Cyprus
- Frequencies: 92.8 & 105.3 MHz
- Branding: Astra 92,8

Programming
- Format: News and music

Ownership
- Owner: Radiostage Co. Limited (Dialogos Media Group)

History
- First air date: 7 December 1994
- Call sign meaning: Astra 92,8

Technical information
- Class: News radio

Links
- Webcast: Dialogos.com.cy
- Website: Dialogos.com.cy

Radio Astra (Ράδιο Άστρα) is a privately owned radio broadcasting station in Cyprus with island-wide coverage. It was launched by a company called Radio Stage on 7 December 1994.
