= KQSE =

- Gypsum, Colorado; United States
- Frequency: 102.5 MHz
- Branding: La Nueva Mix

Programming
- Format: Spanish variety

Ownership
- Owner: Patricia MacDonald Garber and Peter Benedetti; (AlwaysMountainTime, LLC)

History
- Former call signs: KQZR (2000–2007)

Technical information
- Licensing authority: FCC
- Facility ID: 86173
- Class: C2
- ERP: 1,350 watts
- HAAT: 660.0 meters (2,165.4 ft)
- Transmitter coordinates: 39°44′18.00″N 106°47′58.00″W

Links
- Public license information: Public file; LMS
- Webcast: Listen Live
- Website: KQSE website

KQSE (102.5 FM, Nuevo Mix) is a radio station broadcasting a Spanish variety music format. Licensed to Gypsum, Colorado, United States. The station is currently owned by Patricia MacDonald Garber and Peter Benedetti, through licensee AlwaysMountainTime, LLC.

== History ==
The station was assigned the call letters KQZR on September 6, 2000. On December 24, 2007, the station changed its call sign to the current KQSE.
