= WSOJ-LP =

Coordinates: 35.661°N 85.752°W

- McMinnville, Tennessee; United States
- Frequency: 102.5 MHz
- Branding: Gospel Radio

Programming
- Format: Religious

Ownership
- Owner: COMMUNITY OF GOOD SAMARITANS, INC

History
- First air date: 2004-08-26

Technical information
- Licensing authority: FCC
- ERP: 52 watts
- HAAT: 42 meters

Links
- Public license information: LMS
- Website: wsoj.net

WSOJ-LP is a low power FM religious radio station in McMinnville, Tennessee, United States. The station is on 102.5 FM. The radio station broadcasts the teachings and singing of the Churches of Christ.
