= Sara FM =

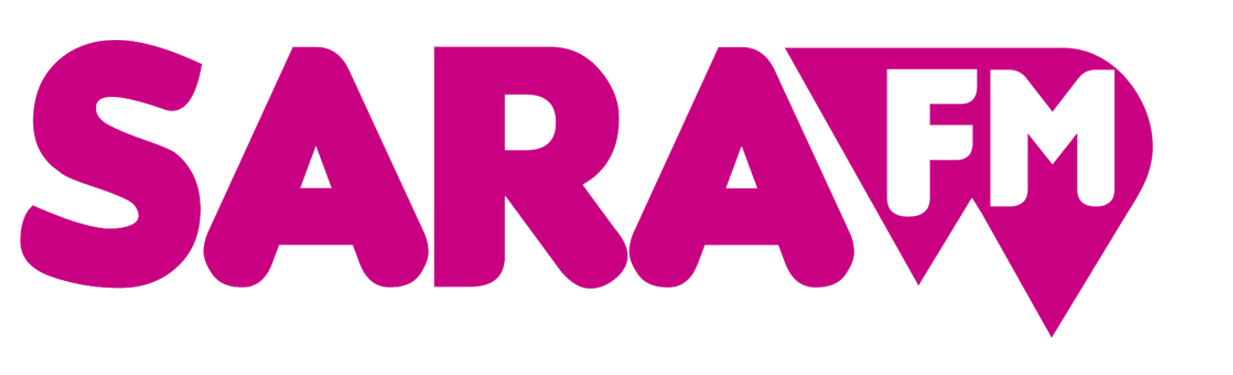
- Kyrenia; Northern Cyprus
- Frequency: 97.0 MHz (FM)

Programming
- Language: Turkish
- Format: Pop music

History
- First air date: 2014
- Last air date: 2023

Sara FM was a radio broadcasting station that broadcast via FM band 97.0 MHz frequency in Northern Cyprus. Today Kıbrıs Türk FM is broadcasting on the frequency.

== Radio Hosts ==
- Burç Tunçer (Weekdays: 10:00-12:00) (Cyprus Time)
- Mehmet Ali Ayanoğlu (Weekdays: 12:00-14:00 & 17:00-19:00) (Cyprus Time)
