= Yahoo Live =

Yahoo! Live

- Website type: Live video broadcast
- Available in: English
- Owner: Yahoo!
- Creator: Yahoo!
- Website: live.yahoo.com
- Commercial: No
- Registration: Optional
- Launched: February 6, 2008
- Current status: Discontinued

Yahoo! Live or Y! Live was a Yahoo! service that allowed users to broadcast videos in real time. The service was closed on December 3, 2008.

== History ==
Yahoo! Live was launched on February 6, 2008 as a "limited preview" and in spite of Yahoo!'s rejection to Microsoft's offer just a few days earlier, the site crashed the same night it was launched due to lack of bandwidth.

The service was conceived and created by Michael Quoc (Director of Products), Matthew Fukuda (Head of Design), Eric Fixler (Engineering Lead) and others in the Yahoo! Advanced Products Group incubator.

On November 3, 2008, Yahoo! Live announced that the service would be ended on Dec. 3.

It was officially discontinued at 7:07 P.M. EST on Dec. 3 2008 with the message "kthxbai" posted on the main page.

== Features ==
The design is similar to the one on Justin.tv. The chat system and video windows are as portable as with ustream.tv. Users can create a channel, authorize their webcam and start broadcasting to the public. Other people can watch, or choose to participate via video, sound or text chat, which can be disabled. Users can also set up profiles and track how many people have watched them stream live, how many broadcasts they have made, and how long they have been on the streaming. Videos are not archived for playback; once it is broadcast, there is no way of recovering the video, and there is no way of streaming other than live, meaning users cannot pre-record videos and then broadcast them.
