= KMAZ-LP =

Coordinates: 29.7585°N 95.3682°W

- Houston, Texas; United States
- Broadcast area: Greater Houston
- Frequency: 102.5 MHz
- Branding: Amazing 102.5

Programming
- Format: Urban adult contemporary
- Affiliations: Black Information Network; Compass Media Networks

Ownership
- Owner: Bread of Life, Inc.

History
- First air date: July 20, 2015
- Former call signs: KAYZ-LP (2015, CP)

Technical information
- Licensing authority: FCC
- Facility ID: 192936
- Class: L1
- ERP: 1 watt
- HAAT: 310 meters (1,020 ft)

Links
- Public license information: LMS
- Webcast: Listen live
- Website: amazing1025fm.com

KMAZ-LP (102.5 FM, "Amazing 102.5") is a radio station licensed to Houston, Texas, United States, and serving the Inner Loop and Downtown areas of Greater Houston. The station broadcasts an urban adult contemporary format. KMAZ-LP broadcasts from the top of the Wells Fargo Building, 1000 Louisiana St., Houston TX, 77002. Its coverage area encompasses Downtown Houston, all Wards, The Heights, Montrose, West University, Rice Villages, and most of the areas located within the Interstate 610 Loop.

== History ==
In January 2015, Bread of Life, Inc. was issued a construction permit for a LPFM radio facility on 102.5 MHz in downtown Houston. The facility was granted a License to Cover on July 20, 2015, and began transmission on the same day. Under the facility's construction permit, the station was originally assigned the calls of KAYZ-LP, but were changed to the current KMAZ-LP prior to sign on.
