= KGGN (FM) =

Radio station in Hemet, California

- Hemet, California; United States
- Broadcast area: Inland Empire
- Frequency: 102.5 MHz
- Branding: 102.5 The Vine

Programming
- Language: English
- Format: Christian contemporary

Ownership
- Owner: The Vine Media Network

History
- First air date: March 30, 2018

Technical information
- Licensing authority: FCC
- Facility ID: 184593
- Class: A
- ERP: 4,300 watts
- HAAT: 118 meters (387 ft)
- Transmitter coordinates: 33°35′26″N 116°56′26″W

Links
- Public license information: Public file; LMS
- Webcast: Listen live
- Website: 1025thevine.org

KGGN, "102.5 FM The Vine," is a Christian contemporary radio station in Hemet, California, serving that community and the Inland Empire. In July 2026, the First Baptist Church of Hemet donated the station's license to The Vine Media Network, a non-profit public charity and faith-based organization in Hemet.
