= Açık Radyo =

- Istanbul; Turkey
- Frequency: 95.0 MHz

Programming
- Language: Turkish
- Format: News, music, talk

Ownership
- Owner: Açık Radyo

History
- First air date: November 13, 1995
- Last air date: October 16, 2024

Links
- Website: www.acikradyo.com.tr

Açık Radyo (Open Radio 95.0) was a Turkish independent radio station broadcasting from Istanbul to metropolitan Istanbul and surrounding areas. The station's format included news, music and talk radio.

== Structure ==
Açık Radyo first began broadcasting on November 13, 1995. It was a regional radio station, founded as a private company (as required by Turkish law) but functioning similarly to a nonprofit organization. It had 92 partners, holding near-equal shares. By 2009, Açık Radyo had worked with 935 individuals on more than 822 talk and music shows. All of Açık Radyo's presenters and producers were volunteers except those linked with the morning show program. Nearly 200 presenters contributed to 134 different programs broadcast on Açık Radyo each week. The radio station hosted more than 14,000 guests in its 14 years of broadcasting.

Açık Radyo, with other stations (including Radio Nova Paris and RBB Multikulti Berlin), carried out a collaborative program of research and technological development on world music and the internet. It had also been carrying out program exchanges with four European radio stations: RBB Multikulti Berlin, VDR Funkhaus, Radio Sweden P6, Europa Köln and Radio Bremen. It also aired world-music programs prepared by three 13-year-old presenters for the nonprofit children's radio station, Radijojo.

=== Media coverage ===
Açık Radyo's programs and activities have been reported in more than 6,000 articles, including nearly 120 interviews and broadcasts. It has been the subject of two documentaries.

=== Online presence ===
The Açık Radyo website was launched in early 1997; in May 2000, the station began broadcasting online. A second (subscription) website, named the "Açık ("open") Site", was launched in late 2001; transcripts from interviews and talk shows were posted. In December 2004, Açık Site's subscription system was eliminated and the two websites were combined. As of 2009, an average of 50,000 people visited the website each month.

=== Documentaries ===
In 1996, Açık Radyo acted as a semi-official radio station for the UN HABITAT (II) Conference held in Istanbul, broadcasting bilingually for fifteen days. Since its second year of operation (1996) the station had presented a two-hour yearly wrap-up program, "Last Year in Perspective", on December 31 each year. In 2005, Açık Radyo produced (in cooperation with Radio Nederland) a two-hour program commemorating the 50th anniversary of the Russell-Einstein Manifesto against nuclear arms. In May 2008, sound collages commemorating the 40th anniversary of the 1968 revolution were broadcast daily.

=== Music festivals and exhibitions ===
In 1997 and 1998, in collaboration with Positive Organization, Açık Radyo organized the two Istanbul Musical Festivals. Ten thousand people attended each radio festival; the programs featured an eclectic range of music and 125 activities, including activities for children, international panels, world-premiere performances and dance workshops.

Açık Radyo co-sponsored two photography exhibitions: "1968 Through the Lens of Magnum" in 1968 and "Portraits of the 20th Century" in 2000. Each exhibition drew an audience of about 8,000. In 2006, Açık Radyo organized a fundraiser entitled "NaturMort" ("Still Life") to draw attention to global climate change. Six art galleries and 83 artists contributed, donating their proceeds to the station.

=== Conferences and panels ===
Açık Radyo organized five conferences annually. Over 50 conferences have been held at universities and cultural centers, including panels by Açık Radyo editors and programmers on such topics as broadcasting, independent media, freedom of the press, global climate change, globalization and the history of music.

=== Open-space project ===
In the autumn of 2005, a group of students from İstanbul Bilgi University created a programing contest enabling young people to express themselves through alternative media. This was Açık Radyo's first programming contest for university students (“Change the world, even if it’s for an hour a week”), followed by a second contest (entitled “Let’s Play!”) the following year. Sixty-four young people from eighteen universities participated with forty-seven projects. Winning projects were aired on Açık Radyo for six months.

=== Listener-supported projects ===
An opinion poll conducted by AC Nielsen in 2000 showed that Açık Radyo's "core listeners" (those who listen every day) numbered around 45,000; those who listened every other day, 80,000; once a week, 120,000; the number of people who listened at least once during the last three months was around 200,000. According to polls conducted by the Istanbul Foundation of Culture and Arts (IKSV) in 2001 and 2003, among music listeners and film-goers at the International Festivals of Classical Music, Jazz, and the Istanbul International Film Festival Açık Radyo was chosen as the most popular radio station.

In early March 2004 a fundraising project, "Açık Radyo is seeking its listeners", was begun to augment the efforts of the 92 founders and 650 volunteer presenters with contributions from listeners to attain a level of "sustainable independence." With the addition of funds raised from a few thousand "listener-sponsors" to income from advertisements and sponsorship, Açık Radyo hoped to reach a level of permanent financial sustainability.

During a year-long campaign, listeners were asked to sponsor one (or more) programs. At the end of 2004, the number of sponsors totaled 2,250. The second campaign, in 2005, yielded a similar number of individual sponsors. Every year, Açık Radio announced its listener-support project with a one-week radio festival featuring guests and special shows. In March 2006, the third listener-support campaign lasted 99 hours over nine days. One hundred old (and new) presenters came together in panel programmes to discuss the last ten years of culture and music broadcasting of Açık Radio and around the world.

A fourth project, "Altogether with Açık Radyo", was held between 24 February and 4 March 2007. During these nine days, nearly forty "regular" listeners participated in programs. At the end of the ninth day, the number of individual sponsors reached 3,000. The fifth special project, "Altogether With Açık Radyo, Forever!," featured celebrity presenters and articles from the soon-to-be published Open Book (the Açık Radyo encyclopedia) were incorporated into programmes by their authors. In March 2009 the sixth listener-support drive was held over nine days, with the majority of listeners renewing their support. At the end of this drive, the number of individual sponsors at Açık Radyo reached 4,500.

== Shutdown ==
On 22 May 2024, the station was ordered suspended for five days by the Radio and Television Supreme Council (RTÜK) for allegedly inciting hatred following remarks made by a guest the previous month describing the killing of Armenians in the Ottoman Empire during World War I as genocide. RTÜK subsequently withdrew the station's broadcasting licence on 3 July, and Açık Radyo made its last broadcast on 16 October, while appealing its closure.

== Awards ==
Açık Radyo received 38 awards in Turkey between November 1996 and October 2007. Among them are:

- 2008 – Izmir International Fair Award, for its campaign against global warming
- 2007 – Public Service Award from Istanbul branch of Ankara University Political Science graduate faculty
- 2007 – TGC (Turkish Association of Journalists) Nezih Demirkent Special Award for broadcasting for protection of the environment and warnings about global warming
- 2006 – Turkish Tour Guides Association Broadcasting for Sustainable Environment Award
- 2005 – Association for Recorded Sound Collections Award for Best Research in Recorded World Music won by programmer Cemal Ünlü for his book Git Zaman, Gel Zaman (Pan Yayıncılık, 2004), based on his programs at Açık Radyo
- 2003 – Best Radio Program of 2003 (Association of Turkish Journalists)
- 2002 – Best Radio Station of 2002 (Association of Contemporary Journalists)
- 2001 – Most Successful Radio Station of 2001 (Istanbul University Faculty of Communications)
- 2000 – Most-Preferred Radio Station of 2000 (Marmara University Faculty of Communications)
- Two awards for radio programs using the best Turkish (2001, 2000)
- Four awards for technology and computer sciences (1996–1999)
- Turkish Association of Journalists Radio Program Awards (1998, 1997)
- Three awards for health programming: Istanbul Chamber of Medicine (2004, 1999), Turkish Association of Physicians (2000)
