= Mix FM Cyprus =

Radio station in Nicosia, Cyprus

Strovolos, Nicosia; Cyprus
- Frequencies: 90.8 MHz (Nicosia/Limassol); 102.3 MHz (Larnaca/Paphos); 104.6 MHz (Famagusta)

Programming
- Languages: Greek, English
- Format: Contemporary hit radio

History
- First air date: 23 February 2002

Links
- Webcast: Mix FM Cyprus
- Website: Mix FM Cyprus

Mix FM is a Cypriot radio station in Strovolos, Nicosia, Cyprus. It started broadcasting on 23 February 2002 via 102.3 FM (Larnaca/Paphos), 90.8 FM (Nicosia/Limassol) and 104.6 FM (Famagusta).
