= SF Public Press =

San Francisco Bay Area non-profit news organization

San Francisco Public Press
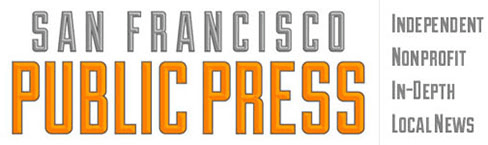
- Type: Print + Online newspaper
- Founder(s): Michael Stoll, Lila LaHood
- Publisher: Lila LaHood
- Associate editor: Noah Arroyo
- Managing editor: Liz Enochs
- Founded: 2009
- Headquarters: Warfield Commons 988 Market Street; San Francisco, California
- Website: SFPublicPress.org; SFPublicPress.org/KSFP

San Francisco Public Press, a.k.a. SF Public Press, is a non-profit online and print news organization covering the Bay Area. It was founded in 2009. The organization receives funding from The San Francisco Foundation and is fiscally sponsored by Independent Art & Media. The organization's professed goal is to do for print and online news what public media has done for radio and television.

The Public Press started as a local online publication that started publishing print newspaper editions in 2010. Tom Goldstein, a professor at the UC Berkeley Graduate School of Journalism told the San Francisco Chronicle that the move, "strikes me as audacious," adding that the move set the Press "apart, and there may be great benefit in being set apart."

In 2019, the Public Press launched KSFP-LP, a low-power FM station at 102.5 FM.

== Awards ==
In 2021, the Public Press received four 1st place awards from The San Francisco Press Club. In 2022, three Public Press reporters won Society for Professional Journalists Northern California awards in "Health Reporting" and "Community Journalism" categories.

== See also ==
- Institute for Nonprofit News (member)
