= Radyo 1 =

Turkish national radio station

TRT Radyo 1
- Turkey
- RDS: TRT RADYO-1 RADYONUN OLDUGU HERYERDE RADYO-1 4442401 RADYO-1 93.3 MHZ RADYO-1

Programming
- Language: Turkish
- Format: News, speech

Ownership
- Owner: TRT

History
- First air date: 6 May 1927; 99 years ago

Links
- Webcast: Web Stream
- Website: Official website

Radyo 1 is a major radio station of TRT. This network is the earliest radio network in Turkey. Radyo-1 is not a specialized network and presents programs of general interest, including news, science, art, literature, drama, sports, environment, economy, magazine and music.

== Technical details ==
Originally the broadcast was on long wave and medium wave. But the infrastructure for MW transmission is now used by the regional radio services of TRT, and Radyo 1 is broadcast on FM band, except for the MW 927 kHz one which is still used for Radyo 1. Although there are many transmitter stations only those stations which are mainly directed to province capitals are shown below. The ERP of these FM transmitters is 50 kW or more.

City	Frequency, MHz.
Adana	96.7
Ankara	93.3
Antalya	88.4
Bursa	99.6
Diyarbakır	98.4
Edirne	97.9
Erzurum	90.8
Eskişehir	89
Gaziantep	92
Istanbul	95.6
İzmir	94.7
Kahramanmaraş	99.8
Kayseri	89.4
Kocaeli	90.4
Konya	96.4
Malatya	101.3
Mersin	92
Trabzon	88.8
