= Radyo 2 =

Turkish national radio network

TRT Radyo 2 TRT FM
- Type: Radio station
- Country: Turkey
- Broadcast area: Worldwide
- Headquarters: Kızılay Square, Çankaya Kızılay, Ankara

Programming
- Language(s): Turkish

Ownership
- Owner: TRT

History
- Founded: 1 May 1964; 62 years ago

Coverage
- Affiliates: TRT 2

Links
- Webcast: Web Stream
- Website: Official website

Radyo 2, also known as TRT FM, is a radio network of TRT, the national public broadcaster of Turkey. Radyo 2 specializes in Turkish pop music.

== Technical details ==
Radyo 2 was the first radio network in Turkey to broadcast on FM. Below are the frequencies of some Radyo 2 transmitters. The ERP power of these transmitters are 50 kW or more.

City	Frequency, MHz.
Adana	92.5
Ankara	88.0
Antalya	95.6
Bursa	95.0
Denizli	93.2
Diyarbakır	95.5
Erzurum	98.8
Eskişehir	96.8
Gaziantep	97.6
Istanbul	91.4
İzmir	91.2
Kayseri	97.2
Kocaeli	96.0
Konya	98.6
Mersin	90.0
Trabzon	95.0
Zonguldak	97.2
