= List of active Italian military aircraft =

The following is a list of military aircraft currently used by the four branches of the Italian Armed Forces: Italian Army, Italian Navy, Italian Air Force, Guardia di Finanza, Italian Coast Guard, and Carabinieri.

Coat of arms of the Italian Air Force

== Air Force ==
=== Current inventory ===
Picture	Aircraft	Origin	Type	Variant	In service	Notes
Combat aircraft
	F-35 Lightning II	USA; Italy	Multirole stealth fighter	F-35A	43	Ordered in 2012: 60 F-35A; 15 F-35B; Ordered in 2024: 15 F-35A; 5 F-35B
	F-35 Lightning II	USA; Italy	Multirole stealth fighter, STOVL	F-35B	5	Ordered in 2012: 60 F-35A; 15 F-35B; Ordered in 2024: 15 F-35A; 5 F-35B
	Eurofighter	UK; Germany; Italy; Spain	Multirole	F-2000A	89	
	Eurofighter	UK; Germany; Italy; Spain	Conversion trainer	TF-2000A	89	
	Eurofighter	UK; Germany; Italy; Spain	Multirole	Tranche 4	0 (+ 24 on order)	24 ordered in 2024, replacing the Eurofighter Tranche 1.
	Tornado	UK; Germany; Italy	Multirole	IDS	19	Being replaced by the F-35.
	Tornado	UK; Germany; Italy	Electronic warfare	ECR	12	Being replaced by the F-35.
	Tornado	UK; Germany; Italy	Conversion trainer	IDS	4	Being replaced by the F-35.
AEW&C
	G550 CAEW	USA; Israel	Airborne early warning and control	E-550A	2	Ordered in 2012, in service since 2016. 3 additional planned to be ordered.
Electronic warfare
	C-27J Spartan	Italy	Electronic warfare	EC-27 Jedi	3	
	EA-37B Compass Call	USA	Electronic Attack	EA-37B	0 (+ 2 on order)	2 ordered in July 2025, and 1 on option.
Reconnaissance
	Super King Air	USA	SIGINT / ISR	350ER Spydr	1	
Maritime patrol
	ATR 72	Italy	ASW / patrol	P-72AS	4	Mission crews are provided by the Italian Navy.
Tanker
	Boeing KC-767	USA	Aerial refueling	–	4	Entered service in 2011.
	Airbus A330	Europe	Aerial refuelling / transport aircraft	A330 MRTT	0 (+ 6 on order)	A330 MRTT the successor of the KC-767, selected in May 2026.
	Lockheed Martin KC-130	USA	Aerial refueling	KC-130J	4	6 acquired, 1 lost in November 2009. 4 remain in service as of 2026.
Transport
	Lockheed Martin C-130 Super Hercules	USA	Tactical airlift	C-130J-30	9	
	Alenia C-27J Spartan	Italy	Transport	–	7	
	Airbus A319	France; Germany; United Kingdom	VIP transport	A319CJ	3	Operated by the 31st Wing.
	Dassault Falcon 900	France	VIP transport	Falcon 900	2	Operated by the 31st Wing.
	Dassault Falcon 900	France	VIP transport	Falcon 900EX	1	Operated by the 31st Wing.
	Gulfstream G650	USA	VIP transport	G650ER	2 (+ 3 on order)	Operated by the 31st Wing. Replaced the Falcon 50 and to replace the Falcon 900 / 900EX.
	Piaggio P-180 Avanti	Italy	VIP transport	P-180A	4	
	Piaggio P-180 Avanti	Italy	VIP transport	P-180 EVO+	5	
Helicopters
	AW101	Italy; UK	Utility / CSAR	–	12	
	AW139	Italy	Utility / SAR	AW139M	30	
	AW139	Italy	VIP transport	VH-139A	2	Operated by the 31st Wing.
Trainer aircraft
	M-346 Master	Italy	Lead-in fighter training	T-346A	27	Among the 27: 23 purchased by the Italian Air Force (6 in 2009, 3 in 2013, 9 in 2016, 5 in 2024); 4 received by the IFTS in 2019. (Leonardo / Italian Air Force)
	Alenia M-345 HET	Italy	Basic trainer / advanced trainer	T-345A	12 (+ 5 on order)	Orders: 5 in 2017; 13 in 2019; A total of 45 planned.
	Aermacchi MB-339	Italy	Basic trainer / advanced trainer	–	23	Being replaced by the M-345.
	SF.260	Italy	Ab initio trainer	–	28	
	Piaggio P-180 Avanti	Italy	Multi-engine trainer	VC-180C (P-180 EVO+)	12	
	Gulfstream G550	USA	Multi-engine trainer	G550	2	Not yet modified to a specialised variant, used for training.
	AW139	Italy	Helicopter trainer	AW139M	2	
	MD 500	USA; Italy	Helicopter trainer	NH-500M	37	Licensed built by Breda Nardi.
Miscellaneous aircraft
	Aermacchi MB-339	Italy	Aerobatics show aircraft	MB-339 PAN	10	21 acquired of this variant.
	M-346 Master	Italy	Aerobatics show aircraft	T-346 PAN	0 (+ 15 on order)	Replacement of the MB-339 PAN with the Frecce Tricolori.
	Piaggio P-180 Avanti	Italy	Radio / radar measures	P-180 EVO+	4	
UAV
	MQ-9 Reaper	USA	ISTAR	MQ-9A Predator B	4 (+ 2 on order)	6 in service initially, 1 lost in an accident in 2019 and 1 lost in Kuwait because of the 2026 Iran war. 4 more MQ-9 are planned.
	LBA Systems Bayraktar TB3	Turkey; Italy	Airstrike, ISTAR	Astore Levante	0 (+6 on order)	6 ordered in October 2026.

Coat of Arms of the Italian Navy

== Italian Naval Aviation ==
=== Current inventory ===
Picture	Aircraft	Origin	Type	Variant	In service	Notes
Combat aircraft
	F-35 Lightning II	USA	Multirole stealth fighter, STOVL	F-35B	8	Orders: 2012: 15 F-35B; 2024: 5 F-35B
	AV-8B Harrier II	UK; USA	V/STOL	AV-8B+	11	Being replaced by the F-35B.
Transport
	Piaggio P-180 Avanti	Italy	Transport	P-180 Maritme	3 (+ 3 on order)	
Helicopters
	AW101	Italy; UK	SAR	SH-101A	10	
	AW101	Italy; UK	VERTREP	MH-101A	8	
	AW101	Italy; UK	ASW / ASuW	EH-101A	4	
	NHIndustries NH90	France; Germany; Italy; Netherlands	ASW / ASuW	SH-90A (NFH)	45	Delivered between 2011 and October 2023. 1 lost in July 2023.
	NHIndustries NH90	France; Germany; Italy; Netherlands	Transport	MH-90A (TTH)	10	Delivered between 2011 and October 2023. 1 lost in July 2023.
	AB-212	USA; Italy	ASW	SH-212A	22	Licensed built by Agusta.
	AB-212	USA; Italy	Utility	MH-212B	22	Licensed built by Agusta.
Trainer aircraft
	AV-8B Harrier II	UK; USA	Conversion trainer	TAV-8B	1	
UAV
	Camcopter S-100	Austria	ISR, helicopter UAV	–	2	
	ScanEagle	USA	ISR, fixed-wing UAV	–	10	

Coat of arms of the Italian Army

== Italian Army Aviation ==
=== Current inventory ===
Picture	Aircraft	Origin	Type	Variant	In service	Notes
Transport
	Piaggio P-180 Avanti	Italy	Transport	P-180A Avanti	3	
	Dornier 228	Germany	Transport, STOL	Do 228-212	3	
Helicopters
	A129 Mangusta	Italy	Attack helicopter	A129C	5	37 out of 60 produced remain in service.
	A129 Mangusta	Italy	Attack helicopter	A129D	32	37 out of 60 produced remain in service.
	AW249 Fenice	Italy	Attack helicopter	AW249 IOC	2 (+5 on order)	The 48 ordered include: 7 AW249 IOC; 12 AW249 FOC (that were planned in IOC); 29 AW249 FOC
	AW249 Fenice	Italy	Attack helicopter	AW249 FOC	0 (+ 41 on order)	The 48 ordered include: 7 AW249 IOC; 12 AW249 FOC (that were planned in IOC); 29 AW249 FOC
	Boeing CH-47 Chinook	USA; Italy	Heavy transport helicopter	CH-47C	5	Of the 40 acquired, 5 remain in service.
	Boeing CH-47 Chinook	USA; Italy	Heavy transport helicopter	CH-47F	15	16 license built by Leonardo. 1 lost in 2026.
	NHIndustries NH90	France; Germany; Italy; Netherlands	Utility / transport	UH-90A (TTH)	59	60 ordered and delivered, 1 of which was lost in an accident.
	AW169	Italy	Utility / MEDEVAC / CASEVAC	AW169MA (UH-169D)	13 (+ 12 on order)	Programme LUH, successor of the A109, AB-206, AB-205, AB-212, and AB-412. Orders: 15 in 2022; 10 in 2024
	AB-205	USA; Italy	Utility	AB-205	33	License built by Agusta, to be replaced by the UH-169D.
	AB-205	USA; Italy	Utility	AB-212	27	License built by Agusta, to be replaced by the UH-169D.
	AB-205	USA; Italy	Utility	AB-412	27	License built by Agusta, to be replaced by the UH-169D.
	AB-206	USA; Italy	Utility	–	29	License built by Agusta, to be replaced by UH-169D.
Trainer aircraft
	AgustaWestland AW169	Italy	Helicopter trainer	UH-169B (based on AW169 ABC)	2	2 acquired in December 2019 for training, received in July 2020.
UAV
	RQ-7 Shadow	USA	ISTAR	–	16	4 TUAS systems ordered in 2010 with 4 drones each.

Coat of arms o the Guardia di Finanza

== Guardia di Finanza ==
=== Current inventory ===
Picture	Aircraft	Origin	Type	Variant	In service	Notes
Maritime patrol
	ATR 72	Italy	ASW / Maritime patrol aircraft	P-72A	4	
	ATR 42	Italy; France	Maritime surveillance	ATR-42-400MP	4	
Transport
	P-180	Italy	Transport	P-180 Avanti II	2	
Helicopters
	AW169	Italy	Utility / Transport	AW-169M	24	6 with fixed landing gear and 18 with skids
	AW139	Italy	Utility / Transport		20	
	AW109	Italy	Utility / Transport	AW-109N	4	
	NH-500	USA	Trainer	NH-500MC	6	
	NH-500	USA	Trainer	NH-500MD	6	

Coat of Arms of the Carabinieri

== Carabinieri ==
=== Current inventory ===
Picture	Aircraft	Origin	Type	Variant	In service	Notes
Fixed-wing
	P-180	Italy	Transport	P-180 Avanti II	2	
Helicopters
	AB-412	USA; Italy	Search and Rescue / Utility	AB-412	9	License built by Agusta
	AB-412	USA; Italy	Search and Rescue / Utility	AB-412HP	12	License built by Agusta
	AB-412	USA; Italy	Search and Rescue / Utility	AB-412SP	9	License built by Agusta
	AW109	Italy	Utility / Patrol	A109A/A-II	26	
	AW109	Italy	Utility / Patrol	A109E Power	3	
	AW109	Italy	Utility / Patrol	A109N Nexus	17	
	AW119 Koala	Italy	Utility / Patrol	AW-119Kx	20	
	AW139	Italy	Utility / Patrol	UH-139D	3	
	AW169	Italy	Utility / Patrol	AW169M	6	
	NH-500	USA	Trainer	NH 500D	10	

Coat of arms of the Air Service of the Italian Coast Guard

== Italian Coast Guard ==
=== Current inventory ===
Picture	Aircraft	Origin	Type	Variant	In service	Notes
Maritime patrol
	ATR 42	Italy; France	Maritime surveillance	ATR-42MP-420	1	
	ATR 42	Italy; France	Maritime surveillance	ATR-42MP-500	2	
	ATR 42	Italy; France	Maritime surveillance	ATR-42MP-600	1	
	P-180	Italy	Maritime surveillance	P-180 Avanti II	1	
Helicopters
	AB412	Italy	Search and Rescue	AB-412HP Koala	5	
	AW139	Italy	Search and Rescue	PH-139 Nemo	15	

== See also ==
- Italian Armed Forces
