= A129 =

A129 may refer to:

- A129 road (England), a road in Essex connecting Shenfield and Hadleigh
- Agusta A129 Mangusta, a 1983 Italian attack helicopter
