= VAW-126 =

Carrier Airborne Early Warning Squadron 126
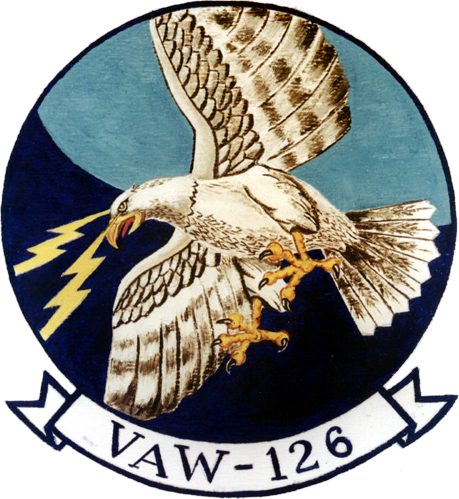
- Active: 1 April 1969 – present
- Country: United States
- Branch: United States Navy
- Type: Carrier Airborne Early Warning
- Part of: Carrier Air Wing 1
- Garrison/HQ: NAS Norfolk
- Nicknames: "Closeouts" "Seahawks"
- Engagements: Gulf War; Global war on terrorism; War in Afghanistan; Operation Enduring Freedom; Iraq War; Operation Inherent Resolve Operation Prosperity Guardian Operation Poseidon Archer

Commanders
- Current commander: Commander K. M. Rose

Aircraft flown
- Electronic warfare: E-2 Hawkeye

Airborne Command and Control Squadron 126 (VAW-126), nicknamed the "Seahawks", is a carrier airborne early warning squadron of the United States Navy. Established in 1969, the squadron and its five E‑2D Hawkeye aircraft are based at Naval Station Norfolk in Virginia.

== Squadron history ==
=== 1960s ===
VAW-126 was commissioned at NAS Norfolk, Virginia on 1 April 1969. Originally nicknamed the "Closeouts", the squadron was equipped with four E‑2A Hawkeye aircraft and assigned to Attack Carrier Air Wing 17 aboard the aircraft carrier USS Forrestal.

=== 1970s ===
After their first deployment in July 1970, the squadron switched to the E‑2B.

The squadron won the COMNAVAIRLANT Battle Readiness Efficiency "E" and the CNO Safety "S" Award in 1971. The squadron won the Battle "E" a second time in 1974.

In September 1974, the squadron transferred to USS America. After their return to NAS Norfolk in October 1974, the squadron began to shift from the E‑2B to the E‑2C, Group 0 variant.

In August 1975, the squadron began operations in the Caribbean Sea with CVW-9, based at NAS Miramar. In May 1976, they began the first of many trips moving the entire squadron back and forth between NAS Norfolk and NAS Miramar to operate with CVW‑9 and prepare for their upcoming deployment aboard USS Constellation. The squadron made their second and final Western Pacific deployment with USS Constellation in May 1978.

The squadron changed their name to "Seahawks" in memory of their commanding officer, CDR Vady Clark, who died suddenly in September 1979.

Upon returning to the East Coast in 1979, the squadron joined USS John F. Kennedy and CVW-1.

=== 1980s ===
In July 1981, VAW-126 joined CVW-3, which replaced CVW‑1 as the air wing deployed aboard USS John F. Kennedy. The September 1983 to May 1984 deployment was a record-breaking one for VAW‑126: they won the 1983 Battle "E", the COMNAVAIRLANT "Silver Anchor" award for superior retention, and the Airborne Early Warning Excellence Award as the best VAW squadron in the Navy.

In August 1986, the squadron left for the Mediterranean for another deployment aboard Kennedy.

Upon their return in March 1987, the squadron participated in a MISSILEX off Brunswick, Maine, operated off the Virginia Capes, provided AEGIS support, and performed with drug interdiction operations. By November 1987, the squadron was back aboard Kennedy in preparation for their next deployment. In 1988, the squadron once again received the COMNAVAIRLANT Battle "E" along with a Meritorious Unit Commendation; they were also nominated by CVW‑3 and CAEWWING‑12 for the Secretary of Defense Maintenance Excellence Award. In June, the Carrier Strike Group assembled for FLEETEX 2‑88, in August, the squadron departed with Kennedy for a fourth time.

=== 1990s ===
The squadron's final deployment attached to Kennedy was in August 1990 for Operations Desert Shield and Desert Storm. The squadron accumulated more than 2,850 flight hours during the operations. On 8 June, the squadron led a mixture of CVW‑3 aircraft in a victory fly-by in Washington, D.C.

In late 1993, the CVW-3 team was reassigned to USS Dwight D. Eisenhower. The following October, it deployed to the Mediterranean with the Eisenhower battle group, receiving the 1994 Battle 'E' and the Airborne Early Warning Excellence awards.

In late 1995, the CVW‑3 team was once again reassigned, this time to USS Theodore Roosevelt.

In November 1996, the squadron deployed to the Mediterranean for operations in and around Bosnia and the Adriatic Sea. While in the Adriatic they provided ABC2, AEW, and ES for NATO air operations. In November 1998, VAW‑126 deployed aboard USS Enterprise for JTG 99‑1. In its first few months, the squadron participated in Persian Gulf operations including Operation Desert Fox and Southern Watch. VAW‑126 also participated in Juniper Stallion, INVITEX, and in Kosovo operations, transiting the Suez Canal four times during the deployment. The Carrier Battle Group wrapped up the deployment in the Persian Gulf and returned home 6 May 1999.

From July to September 1999, VAW-126 participated in counter-narcotic operations, based out of NS Roosevelt Roads, Puerto Rico. The squadron, in cooperation with Joint Interagency Task Force, monitored and detected illegal drug suspects in the Caribbean. After returning from Puerto Rico, VAW‑126 also assisted in air control for the massive search and rescue effort to rescue Hurricane Floyd survivors in North Carolina.

=== 2000s ===
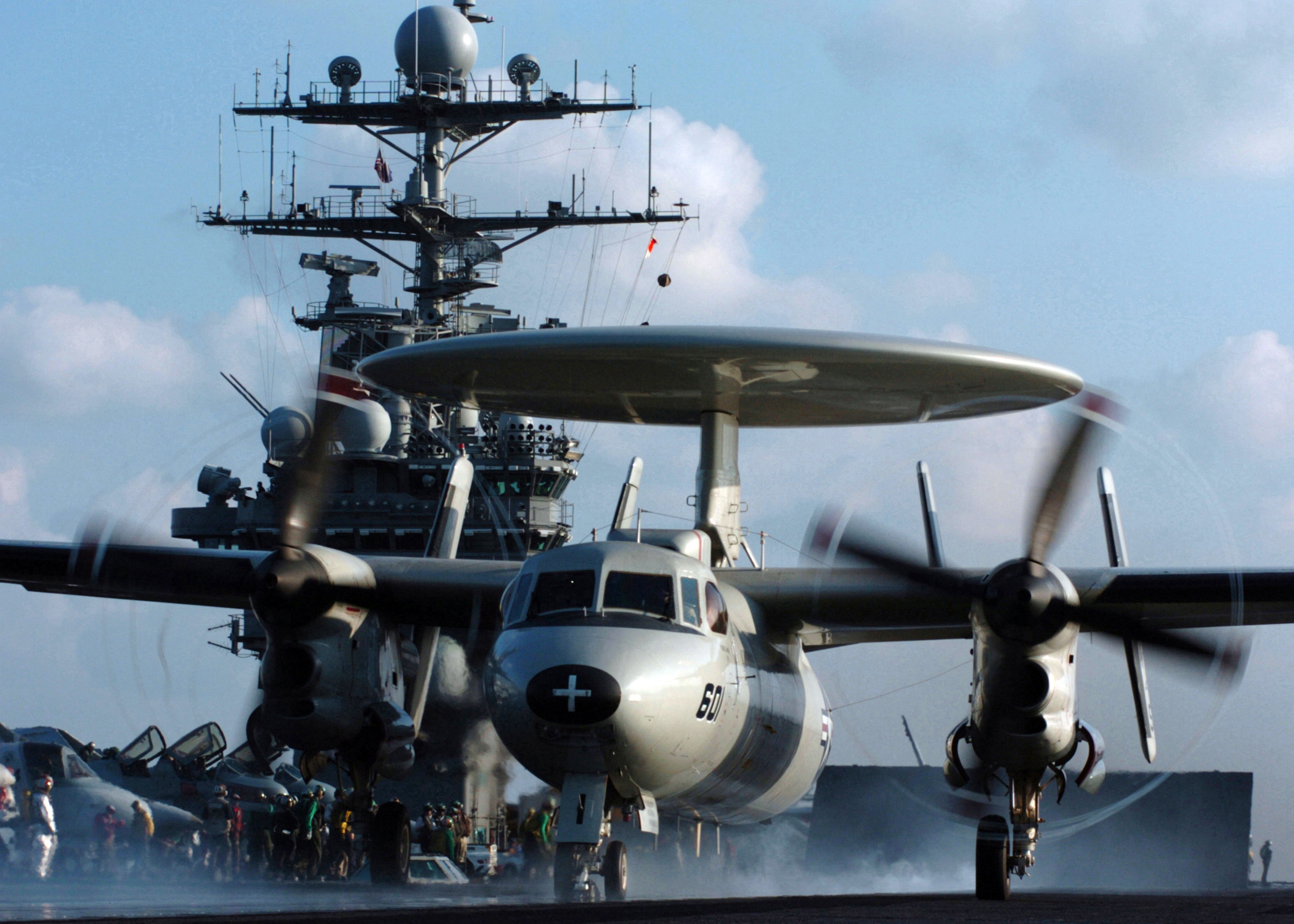
VAW-126 E-2C launches from USS Harry S. Truman

From November 2000 to May 2001, VAW-126 deployed aboard the Navy's then-newest aircraft carrier, USS Harry S. Truman, accumulating more than 850 flight hours over the Mediterranean and Arabian Seas for Operation Southern Watch. Squadron maintenance crews earned two Golden Wrench Awards. After the deployment, the squadron spent several weeks flying counter-narcotic operations from NS Roosevelt Roads.

The squadron deployed aboard Truman with CVW-3 in December 2002, flew 100 sorties and more than 445 hours during Operation Iraqi Freedom, and returned home to Norfolk in May 2003. The Seahawks received the 2003 COMNAVAIRLANT Battle "E" and the 2003 RADM Frank Akers Award for AEW Excellence.

In October 2004, VAW-126 deployed aboard Truman to the Persian Gulf to again participate in Operation Iraqi Freedom. The squadron flew 419 combat missions into Iraq, pushing total OIF flight hours past 2,000. In December 2004, the squadron sent two aircraft from the Persian Gulf to Afghanistan during Operation Enduring Freedom for the inauguration of the first democratically elected president. This was the first time the Seahawks supported two campaigns simultaneously. The squadron returned home in April 2005.

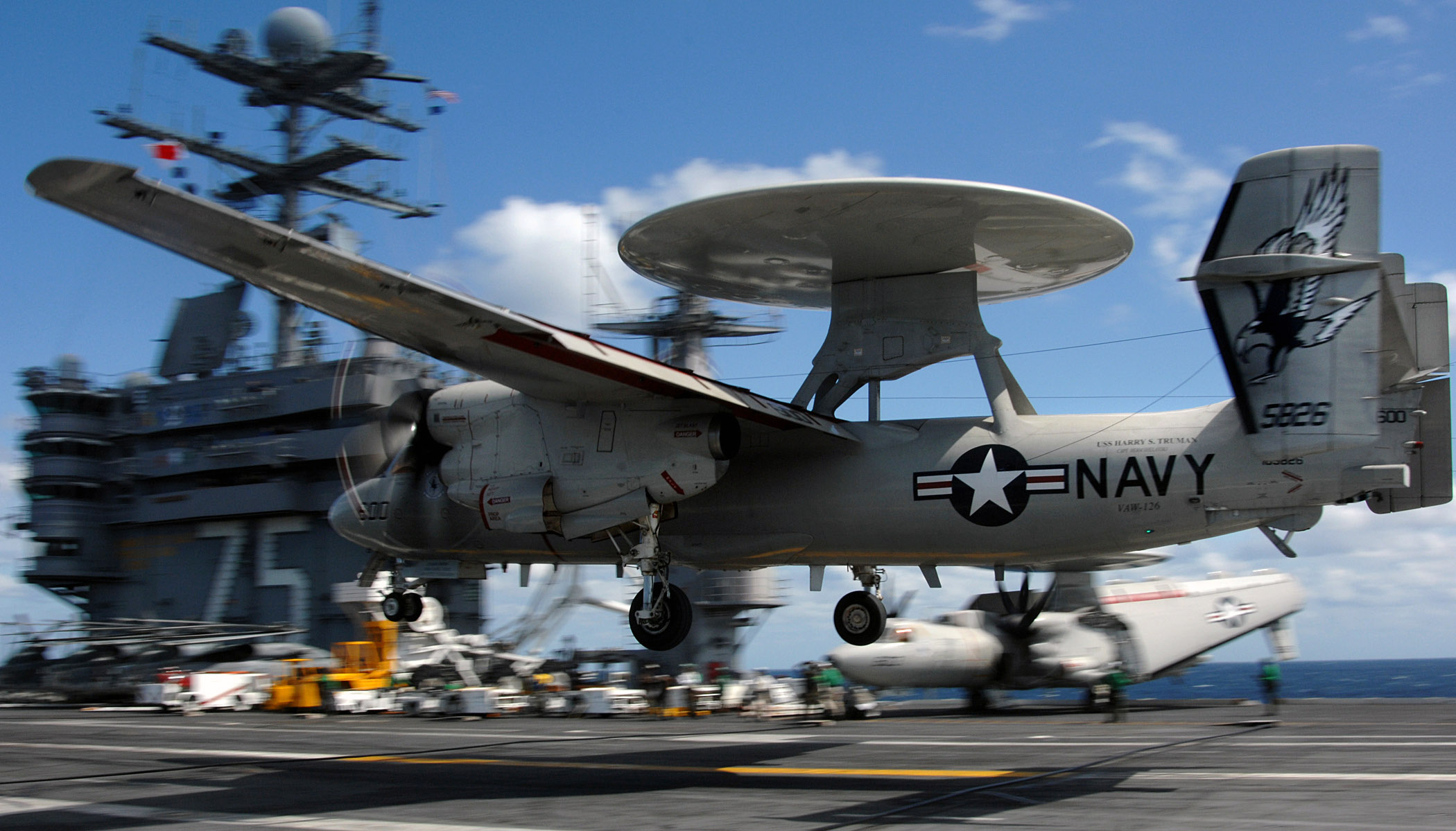
VAW-126 E-2C prepares to land aboard USS Harry S. Truman

In September 2005, the squadron was sent to perform rescue and relief operations after Hurricane Katrina. They helped direct more than 150 aircraft over the devastated Gulf Coast, rescuing survivors and delivering much-needed supplies. They staged out of NAS Pensacola, flying more than 46 sorties over 18 days.

In early 2006, the squadron switched from the E-2C+ Group II aircraft to the E-2C Hawkeye 2000 (HE2K) platform, which brought improved systems and instrumentation. The new aircraft was soon tested in March when the squadron participated in a mini-Strike Fighter Advanced Readiness Program with VFA‑106 and VFA‑37 at NAS Key West, Florida. This exercise enabled the flight officers and pilots to familiarize themselves with the added capabilities of the HE2K in the air-to-air operational environment. In March 2006, the squadron was awarded both the CNAL Battle "E" Efficiency Award and the RADM Frank Akers "A" Award for AEW Excellence for CY 2005.

In December 2007 USS Harry S. Truman transited the Suez Canal and began flights in support of Operation Iraqi Freedom. The next four months included sustained operations over Iraq to help U.S. Army, U.S. Marine Corps, and coalition personnel on the ground. In April 2008, increased insurgent activity in Basra, Iraq, saw the squadron fly combat missions to provide command and control to coalition forces securing the city and defeating the uprising. With a CEC-equipped cruiser or destroyer patrolling the northern Persian Gulf and acting as a relay node, the squadron was sent the strike group commander on Harry S. Truman in the central Persian Gulf a Single Integrated Air Picture (SIAP) extending as far north as Baghdad, Iraq. Combat operations ended for the squadron on 29 April as the strike group prepared for the transit home. The squadron made final port visits to Rhodes, Greece and Marseille, France. After departing Marseille, the squadron hosted and Harry S. Truman welcomed French Navy E‑2C Hawkeyes for a day of carrier launch and recovery operations. The Seahawks returned home to NAS Norfolk on 4 June 2008.

=== 2010s ===
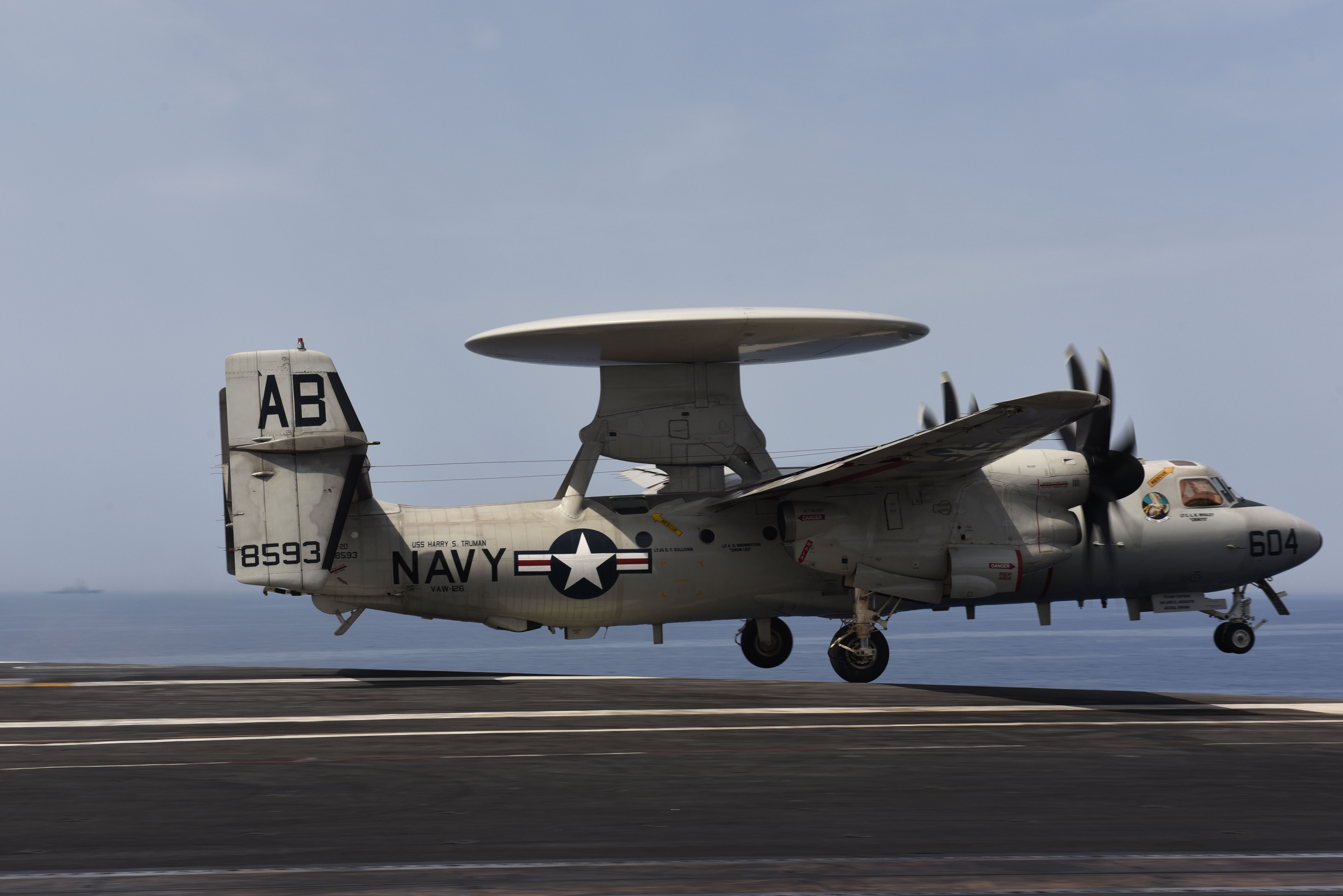
VAW-126 E-2D Hawkeye launches from USS Harry S. Truman in 2018

VAW-126 completed a 2013–2014 Operation Enduring Freedom cruise with Carrier Air Wing 3 aboard USS Harry S. Truman flying the E‑2C Nav Upgrade variant of the Hawkeye.

In March 2015, the squadron participated in Joint Exercise Green Flag 15-06 by providing airborne Command & Control for the Air Force's 548th Combat Training Squadron at Barksdale AFB. In August 2015 the squadron left CVW‑3 and were assigned to Commander, Airborne Command, Control and Logistics Wing. In November 2015, the squadron participated in Joint Exercise Green Flag 16‑02 by providing airborne command and control for the 548th Combat Training Squadron. In January 2016, the squadron began their transition to the E‑2D Advanced Hawkeye platform. In January 2016, they were awarded the 2015 Medical Blue "M" Award.

=== 2020s ===
On 1 January 2020 all VAW-squadrons were redesignated Airborne Command and Control Squadron. In late September 2024, VAW-126 and their E2-Ds departed the US as part of CVW-1 on a scheduled deployment aboard the USS Harry S. Truman (CVN-75)

Following multiple exercises with European militaries, VAW-126 and CVW-1 were ordered to operate in the Red Sea in defense of international shipping lanes and Israel against attacks by the Houthis, an Iranian proxy in Yemen. VAW‑126 and CVW‑1 arrived in the CENTCOM AOR in mid-December 2024, and began combat operations against the Houthis when they arrived in the Red Sea.

Airstrikes were undertaken against the Houthis/Iranians for much of the latter half of December 2024 through April 2025. Strikes against the Houthis/Iranian proxy military units in Yemen increased after March 15, 2025, with VAW‑126 and CVW‑1 conducting increased sorties on a larger set of enemy targets.

== See also ==
- History of the United States Navy
- List of United States Navy aircraft squadrons
