= Westland 30 =

Medium-sized civil helicopter

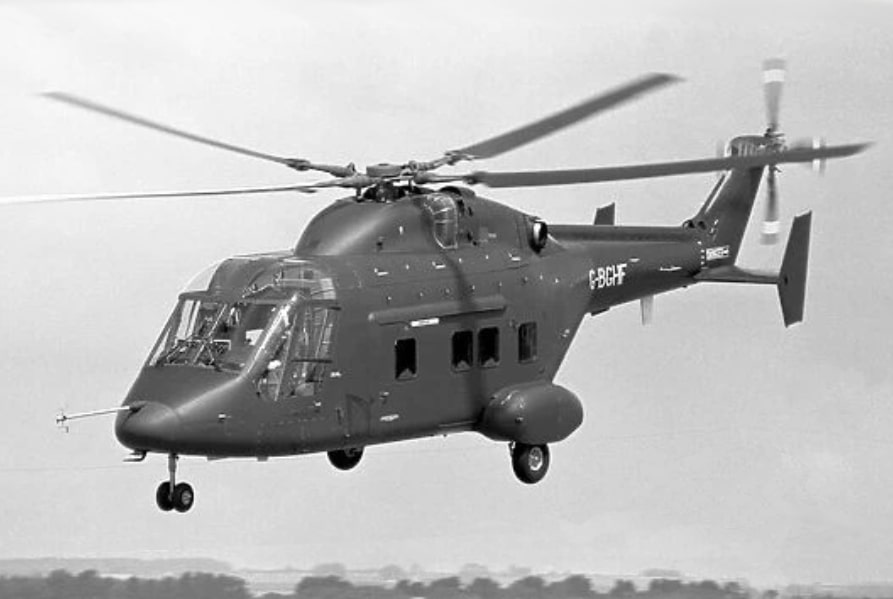
- A Westland 30 during initial testing

General information
- Type: Helicopter
- National origin: United Kingdom
- Manufacturer: Westland Helicopters
- Primary users: Pawan Hans Pan Am; British Airways Helicopters
- Number built: 41

History
- Manufactured: 1981-1987
- Introduction date: 1982
- First flight: 10 April 1979
- Retired: ca. 1991
- Developed from: Westland Lynx

The Westland 30 is a medium-sized civil helicopter designed and produced by the British aerospace company Westland Helicopters. It was derived from the Westland Lynx series of military helicopters, with which it retains a high level of commonality.

The Westland 30 was developed during the late 1970s and early 1980s primarily as a foray into the civilian market. The company sought to expand its presence in that sector, leveraging its existing portfolio to do so; the Lynx shared its dynamic system and other components with the Westland 30, but the latter featured an original airframe to accommodate a sizable passenger compartment. Westland believed that the Westland 30 could be an attractive to operators of air ferry and offshore drilling flights; it was also intended for use as in a military capacity akin to the Aérospatiale SA 330 Puma. It was initially self-financed by the company, although support from the British government was later forthcoming. It had been estimated that there was a worldwide market for around 400 Westland 30s.

On 10 April 1979, the prototype WG30 made its maiden flight. Civil certification from both the Civil Aviation Authority (CAA) and the Federal Aviation Administration (FAA) soon followed. While no military customers would be secured, civilian operators included British Airways Helicopters, Airspur Helicopters Inc. and Omniflight Helicopter Services. The most prominent operator was the Indian company Pawan Hans; the company acquired 21 Westland 30s for oil exploration purposes; however, the type proved difficult to operate in the tropical climate and two fatal accidents occurred, leading to Pawan Hans' fleet being grounded in 1991. India's use of the Westland 30 became a controversial and politically-changed matter for a time. No major operations of the type has since occurred, and the CAA had withdrawn its license by 2000.

== Design and development ==
During the 1970s, several figures at Westland Helicopters, which had a traditionally military-orientated product line, were keen to develop its range to better cater for the civilian sector as well. It had recently completed development of the Lynx, a fast and agile helicopter that was designed for military operators; yet, it had been decided that pursuing civil certification of the Lynx itself was not a financially prudent move, largely due to the limited appeal that it was thought to have to civil operators. At the same time, the company was investigating replacements for its Wessex and Whirlwind helicopters. It was identified that an enlarged version of the Lynx could suit market requirements in addition to the sought successor role.

Accordingly, Westland opted to conduct a detailed study into the civilian-orientated large Lynx concept; it was originally designated WG-30 Super Lynx, but subsequently received the designation Westland 30. This rotorcraft shared the dynamic components, such as the transmission and composite rotor blades, with the Lynx, along with various other commonalities; it primarily differed by its adoption of a new airframe. It featured a conventionally constructed structure composed of aluminium, some elements, such as the tail boom, used composite materials. While mostly identical to that of the Lynx, the rotor system of the Westland 30 is somewhat larger, thus the four blade main rotor assembly turned at a reduced speed to compensate. It was powered by a pair of Rolls-Royce Gem 60-3 turboshaft engines, capable of generating up to 1260 shp;.

The Westland 30 was primarily designed to function as a civilian helicopter; in a passenger carrier capacity, it could carry up to 22 passengers. Entry to the passenger compartment was via sliding doors on the side of the fuselage, an airstair could also be used; there was a separate compartment for stowing baggage located at the rear of the fuselage. In an offshore configuration, the Westland 30-100 could operate with a 250 km (130 nmi) radius of action (227 kg fuel), carrying nine passengers out and 13 home. Furthermore, Westland designed the WG.30 so that it could undertake air ambulance and tactical transport military missions. In a military capacity, the Westland 30 could carry a maximum of 14 troops along with their equipment, up to 17 without, or up to six stretchers and accompanying medical attendants.

Westland decided to proceed with full-rate development, despite an initial lack of government financing for the project; instead, the Westland 30 was self-funded by the company. In the military sector, it would compete with medium-sized rotorcraft such as the French-built Aérospatiale SA 330 Puma. According to the aviation author Stanley McGowen, Westland was counting on the receipt of orders from civil operators that would use the Westland 30 in roles such as an air shuttle, transferring passengers between airports and city centers. By 1981, the Westland 30 was promoted as having a potential global market for 400 rotorcraft. Ultimately, the British government would provide funding to support the programme.

On 10 April 1979, the prototype WG30 conducted its maiden flight. Later that same year, it was put on public display at the Paris Air Show. During 1981, production of the first model, the Westland 30-100, commenced. The type received type certification from the British Civil Aviation Authority (CAA) during December 1981; American Federal Aviation Administration (FAA) certification followed in December 1982. Development of the type continued beyond the Westland 30-100; in 1983, the 30-200, powered by a pair of General Electric CT7-2B turboshaft engines, made its first flight, and the 30-160, which was outfitted with uprated Gem engines, was first flown in 1984. Further models were proposed. However, production of the type was discontinued in 1988, Westland themselves concluding it to have been a commercial disappointment.

== Operational history ==
On 6 January 1982, the first of three Westland 30-100s was delivered to British Airways Helicopters at Beccles; it was put to work supporting gas rigs in the southern sector of the North Sea. The type was later used on the scheduled passenger service between Penzance and the Isles of Scilly, and remained in service when the company became British International Helicopters during 1986. There was a reported reluctance within the CAA and the British Airports Authority to permit a helicopter service linking Milton Keynes with London City Airport.

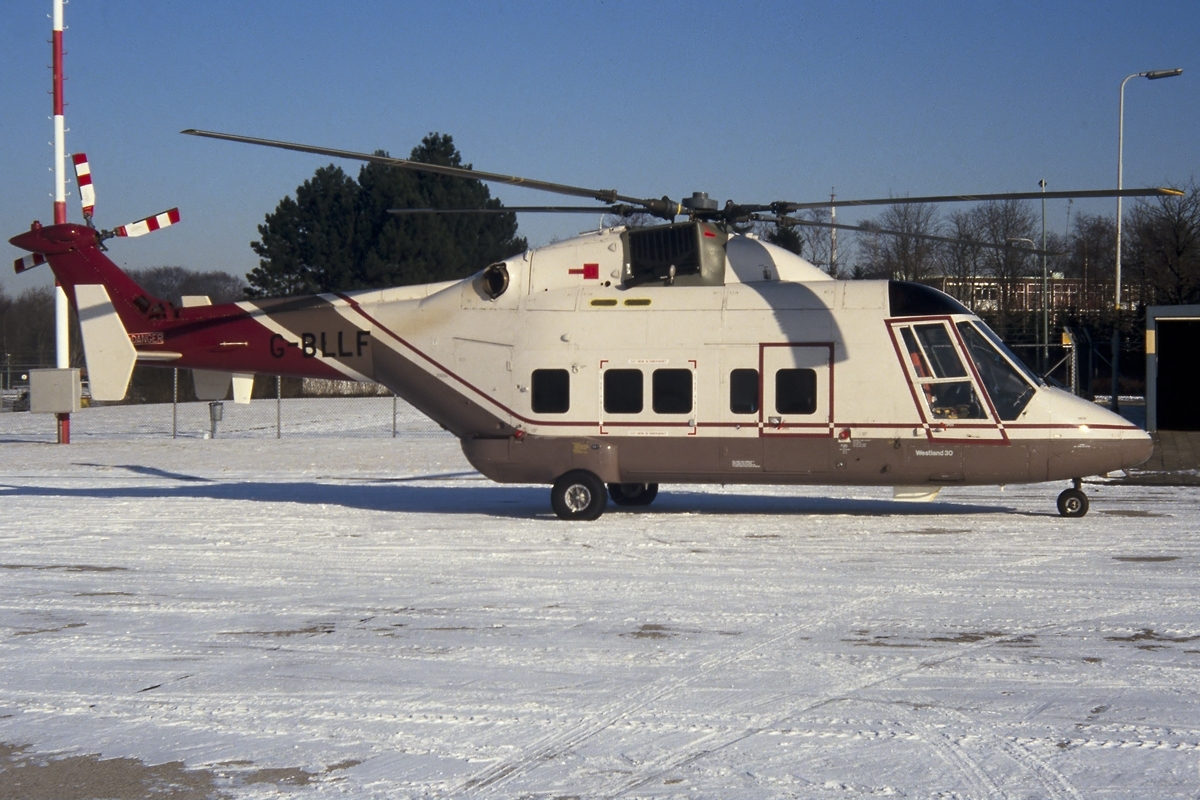
A Westland 30 in the Netherlands, 1987

In the United States, Airspur Helicopters Inc. acquired four Westland 30s on lease to operate scheduled passenger flights in the Los Angeles area, beginning on 9 May 1983. Omniflight Helicopter Services also operated the type on be behalf of Pan American World Airways, linking John F. Kennedy International Airport with Pan Am's East 60th Street Heliport in central Manhattan. Services ceased on 1 February 1988, and the helicopters were returned to Westland; the majority of these would eventually be donated to The Helicopter Museum in Weston-Super-Mare.

The chief operator of the type was the Indian company Pawan Hans. During March 1986, the British government agreed with India to supply 21 Westland 30s for oil exploration duties using a British grant of 65 million pounds. India was allegedly reluctant to accept the deal until it was made clear that the aid would not otherwise be forthcoming. Between 1986 and 1988, the rotorcraft were delivered to Pawan Hans for offshore operations on behalf of the Oil and Natural Gas Corporation Limited (ONGC). A similar number of Aérospatiale SA 365N Dauphin helicopters was also supplied by France. It was soon found that the Westland helicopters were ill-suited to Indian conditions, issues with the Gem engines were reported along with high servicing requirements.

In the aftermath of a pair of fatal accidents, Pawan Hans' fleet of Westland 30s was grounded and placed into storage in 1991; various proposals for their fate were examined throughout the 1990s. During October 2000, 19 of the surviving helicopters were sold to the British company AES Aerospace, but after six had been shipped to the United Kingdom, the deal fell through. It is believed that the rotorcraft are in storage at locations in both the United Kingdom and India.

== Variants ==
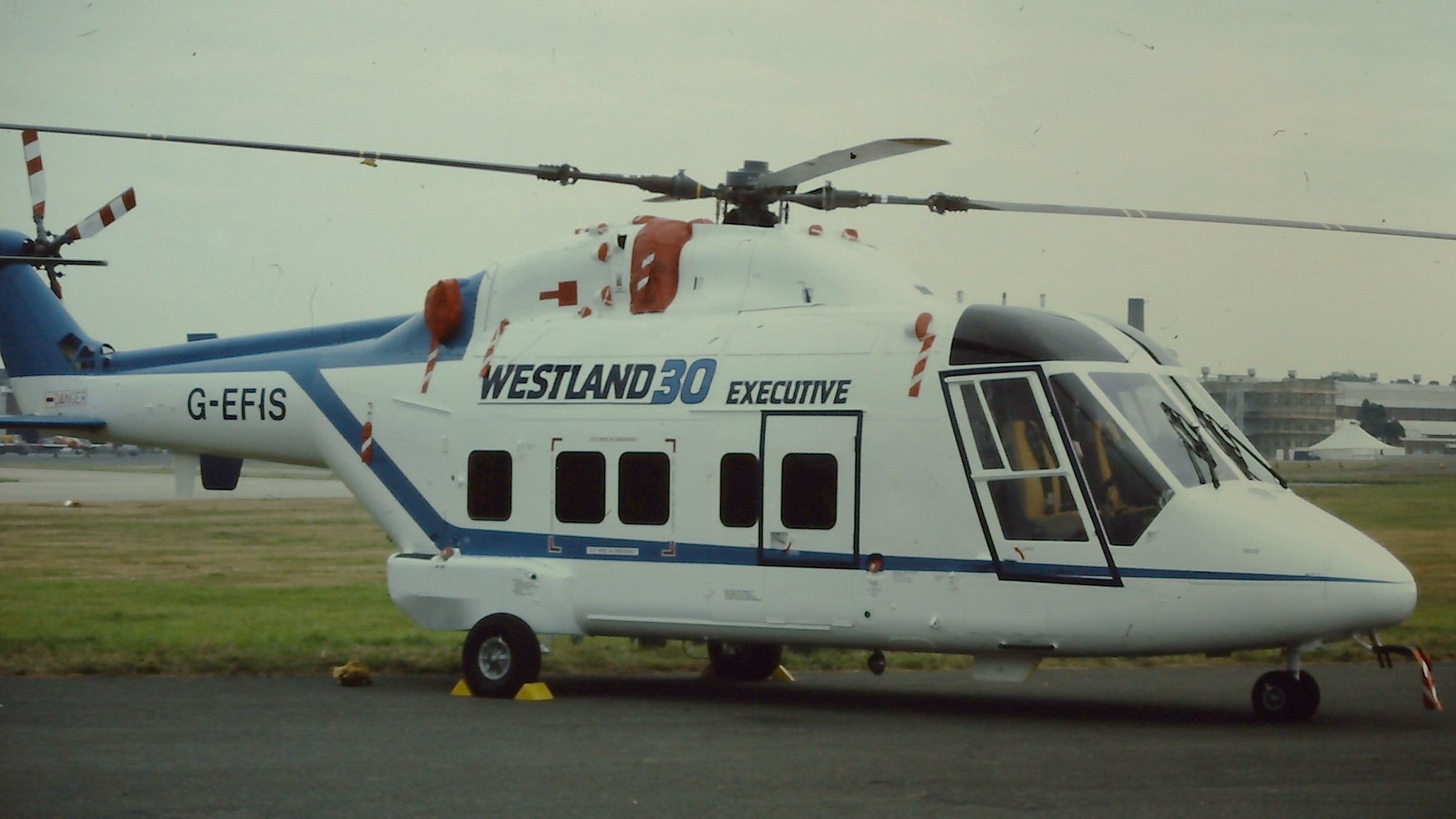
A Westland 30 in 1984

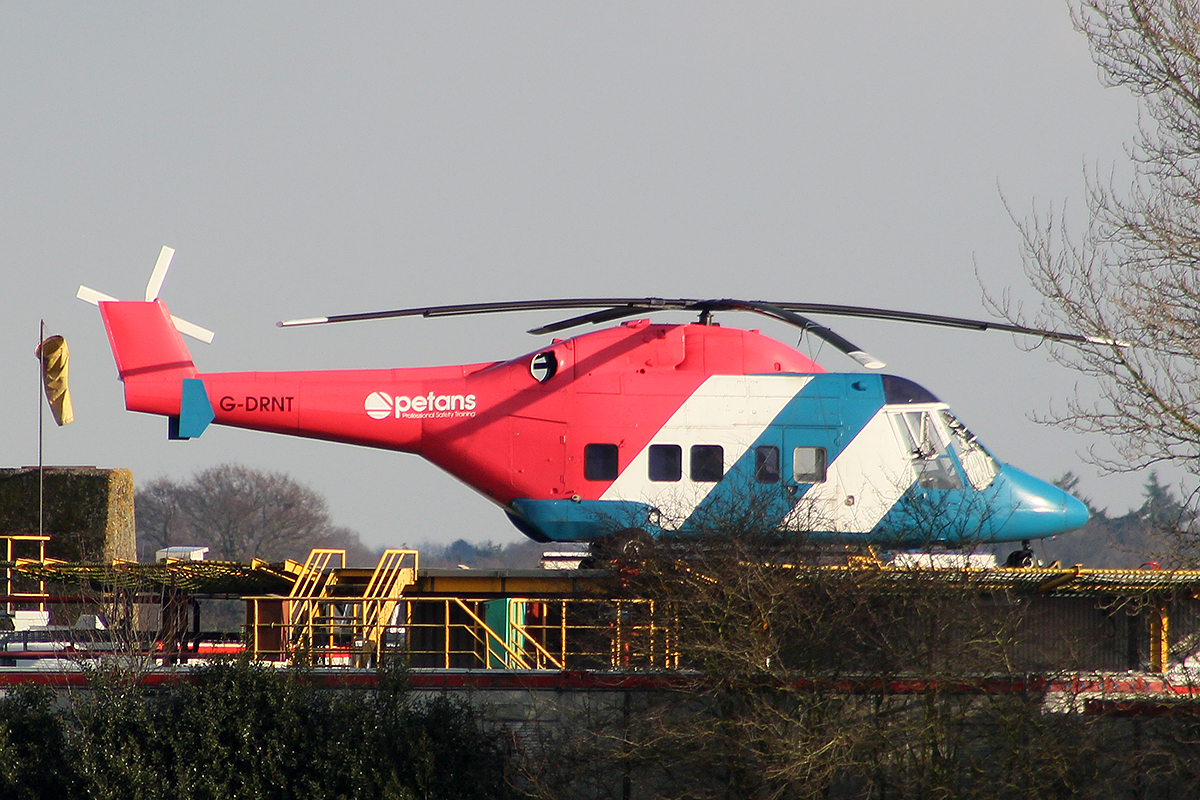
A Westland 30 in 2017

Westland 30 Series 100
Powered by two 846 kW (1,135 shp) Rolls-Royce Gem Mk 41-1 turboshaft engines. 14 built.
Westland 30 Series 100-60
Powered by two 940 kW (1,260 shp) Rolls-Royce Gem 60-3 turboshaft engines. Also known as the Series 160. 24 built.
Westland 30 Series 200
Single aircraft powered by two 1,276 kW (1,712 shp) General Electric CT7-2B turboshaft engines. Variant first flew in 1983.
Westland 30 Series 300
Proposed variant in 1986 with a General Electric CT7 or Rolls-Royce Turbomeca RTM 322 engine. Its maximum takeoff was increased and featured composite BERP rotor blades, reduced noise, and a glass cockpit as an option. Single aircraft.
Westland 30 Series 400
Proposed variant powered by Rolls-Royce Turbomeca RTM322 engines; not built.
TT30
Proposed tactical military transport version. One prototype modified to this configuration.
TT300
Proposed tactical military transport version with 17 seats.

== Operators ==
India

- Pawan Hans

United Kingdom

- British Airways Helicopters

United States

- Pan Am
- Airspur Helicopters

== Aircraft on display ==
- 001 - 30 Series 100 - G-BGHF - The Helicopter Museum, Somerset.
- 003 - 30 Series 100-60 - G-BKKI - AgustaWestland, Yeovil. (No Longer on display.)
- 007 - 30 Series 200 - G-ELEC - The Helicopter Museum, Somerset.
- 020 - 30 Series 300 - G-HAUL - The Helicopter Museum, Somerset.

== Specifications (30-160) ==
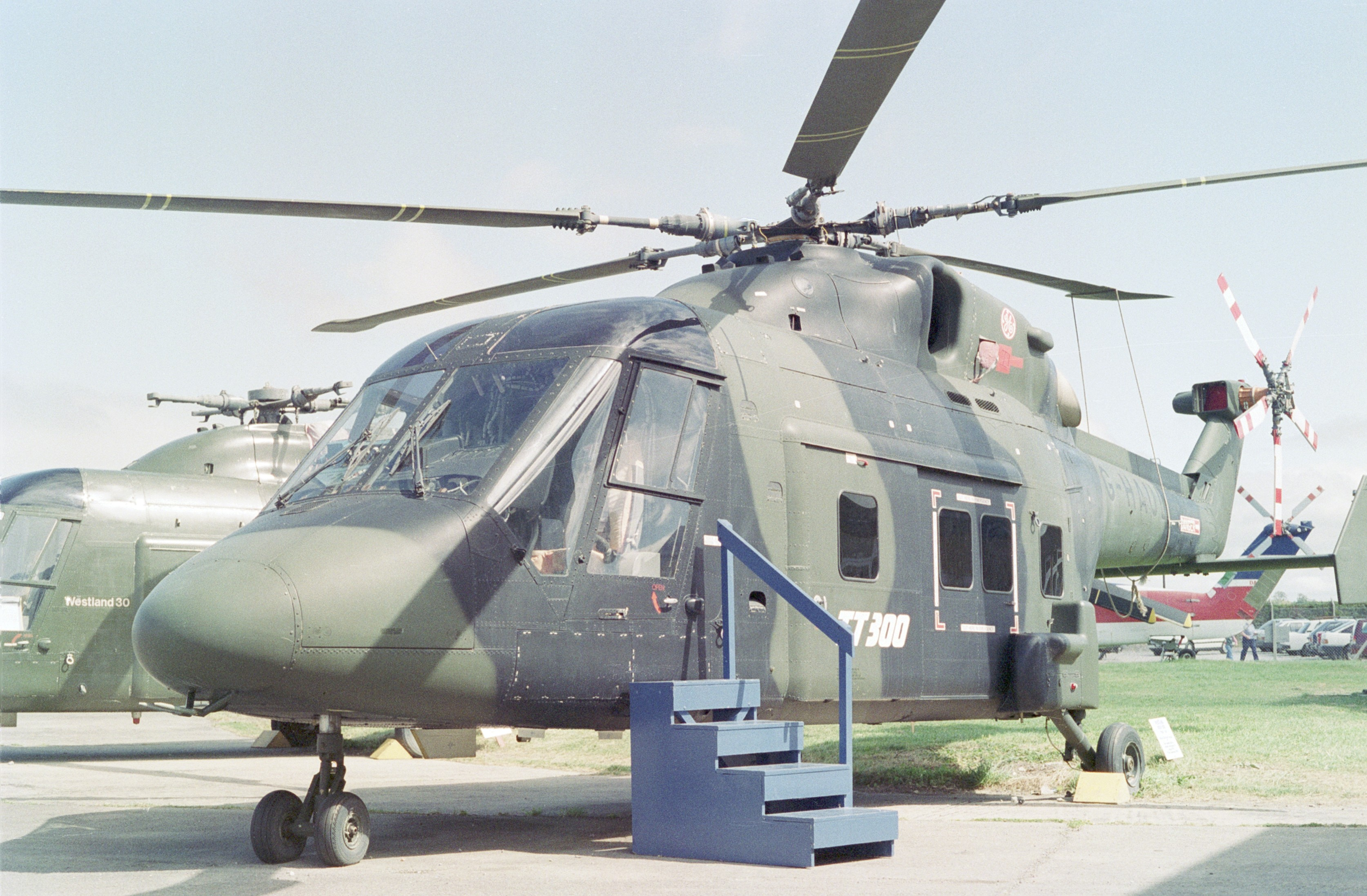
A Westland 30 at the Helicopter Museum, 1993

Data from Westland Helicopters W30 history page Jane's All The World's Aircraft 1982–83

General characteristics

- Crew: 2
- Capacity: 19 passengers (high density seating)
- Length: 52 ft 2 in (15.90 m) overall
- Height: 15 ft 6 in (4.72 m) rotors running
- Empty weight: 6,982 lb (3,167 kg) minimum equipment
- Max takeoff weight: 12,800 lb (5,806 kg)
- Fuel capacity: 1,043 kg (2,299 lb) in two underfloor tanks
- Powerplant: 2 × Rolls-Royce Gem 60-3 turboshaft engines, 1,260 shp (940 kW) each maximum contingency power

1,180 shp (880 kW) intermediate contingency / take-off power
1,150 shp (858 kW) maximum continuous power

- Main rotor diameter: 43 ft 8 in (13.31 m)
- Main rotor area: 1,497.7 sq ft (139.14 m^{2})
- Blade section: root: NPL 9615; tip: NPL 9660

Performance

- Maximum speed: 130 kn (150 mph, 240 km/h)
- Cruise speed: 120 kn (140 mph, 220 km/h) maximum at sea level up to ISA +20 °C (68 °F)
- Max level speed on one engine: 105 kn (121 mph; 194 km/h) at sea level ISA
- Min level speed on one engine: 38 kn (44 mph; 70 km/h) at sea level ISA
- Hover ceiling IGE, ISA: 2,900 ft (884 m)
- Hover ceiling OGE, ISA: 2,900 ft (884 m)
- Range: 255 nmi (293 mi, 472 km) with 4,000 lb (1,814 kg) internal payload, no reserves
- Radius of action: 145 nmi (167 mi; 269 km) offshore oil support, IFR, 45 min hold, 5% fuel reserves
- Ferry range: 395 nmi (455 mi, 732 km) standard fuel
  - 510 nmi (590 mi; 940 km) with auxiliary fuel

Avionics

- Standard aircraft is VFR equipped
- IFR package to include VOR/ILS. DME and ADF optional
- Louis Newmark duplex automatic flight control system for all three axes, with computer based control and duplex heading hold.
- Duplicated three-axis automatic stabilisation equipment.
- Communications and security systems to customer's requirements.
- Digital core avionics system (DCAS) - Westland / Racal-Decca Navigator Ltd.

== See also ==
Related development

- Westland Lynx

Aircraft of comparable role, configuration, and era

- AgustaWestland AW139
- Bell 214ST
