= Leonardo Helicopters AW249 Fenice =

Italian attack helicopter

AW249 Fenice
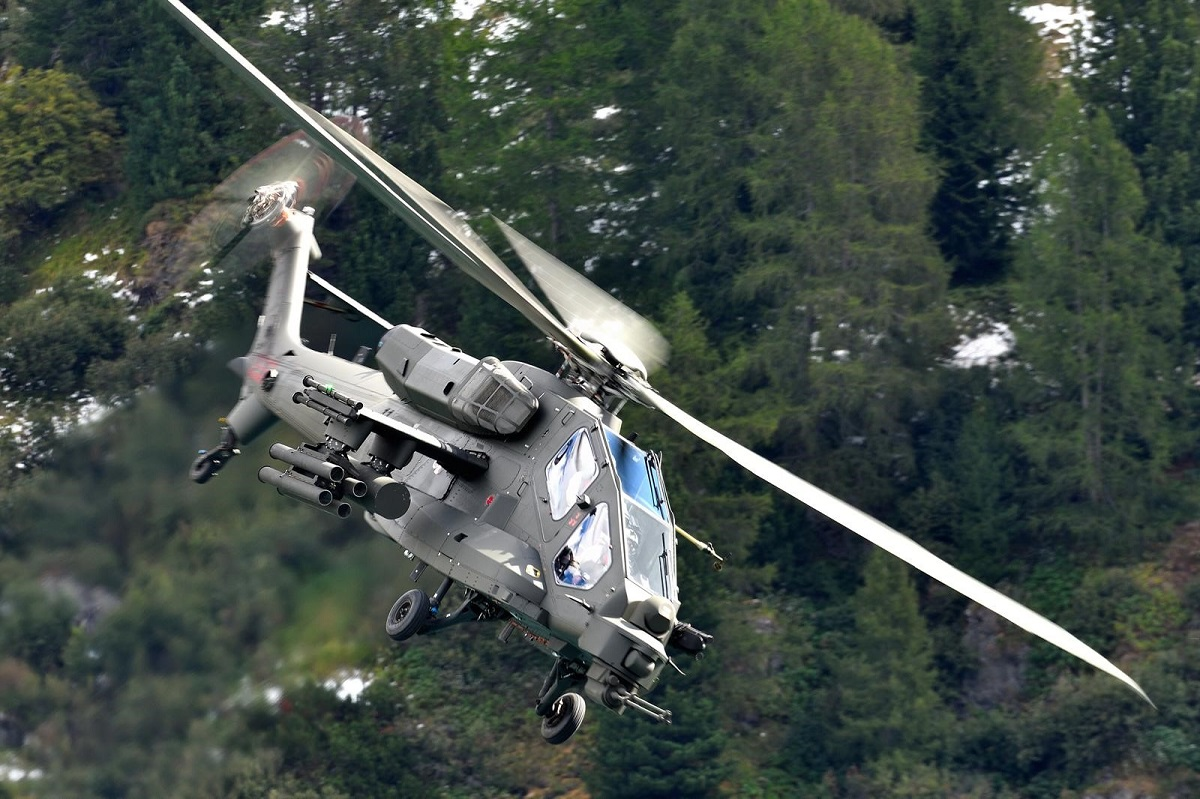
- AW-249 Fenice during the Stella Alpina exercise 2024

General information
- Type: Attack helicopter
- National origin: Italy
- Manufacturer: Leonardo
- Status: Under development
- Primary user: Italian Army Aviation
- Number built: 4 (early 2025)

History
- First flight: 12 August 2022

The Leonardo Helicopters AW249 Fenice (English: Phoenix) is an attack helicopter project under development by the Italian firm Leonardo.

Development of the AW249 formally started upon receipt of a €487 million contract from the Italian Army as a replacement for the Agusta A129 Mangusta. It is to be larger, more survivable, and have greater autonomy than the Mangusta, incorporating stealth technologies and mission systems to control unmanned aerial vehicles (UAV)s. Numerous mature technologies will also be incorporated, such as the OTO Melara TM197B 20 mm chin-mounted cannon, Rafael Advanced Defense Systems Toplite targeting system and Spike missile. It is intended for the AW249 to have lower operating costs than the preceding Mangusta. Leonardo is actively seeking partners to collaborate on the AW249; a letter of intent on this matter was signed with the Polish Armaments Group during July 2018.

The maiden flight of the AW249 was originally scheduled to take place during 2020, but flew for the first time on 12 August 2022 from the company’s plant in Vergiate. There are to be a single prototype and three pre-serial production rotorcraft built ahead of quantity production AW249s. As per the original timetable released in 2017, the AW249 was to be in service by 2025 to enable the retirement of the Mangusta to commence.

== Development ==
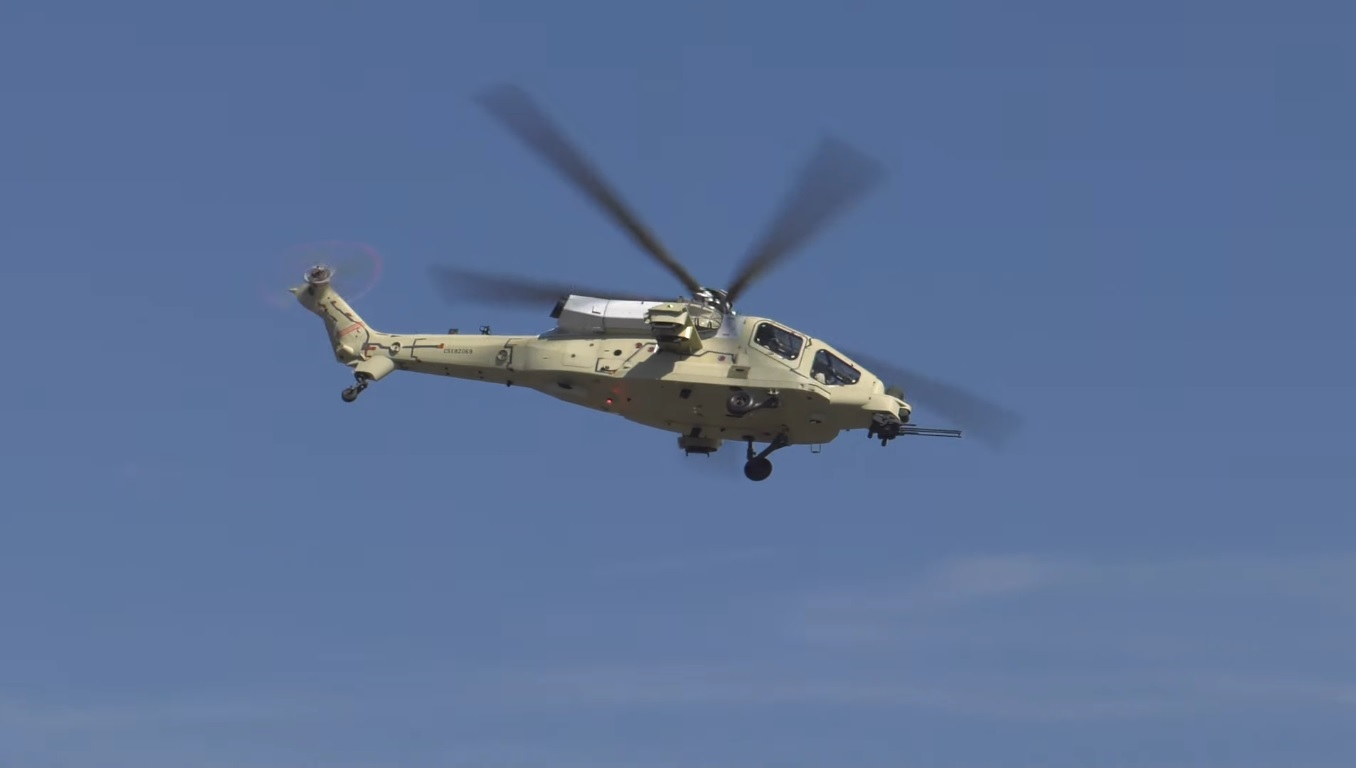
AW249 during its test flight

In January 2017, the Italian Army awarded a €487 million ($515 million) contract to Leonardo for the development of a successor to the Agusta A129 Mangusta attack helicopter. The total cost of the AW-249 was announced to be €2.7 billion in total, it includes the development cost of €487 million.

A total of 59 A129 Mangusta were inducted into the Italian Army, and the type has been in service since 1990; by 2018, only 32 A129s reportedly remained operational. At the time of the contract's award, the Mangusta was to be withdrawn from 2025, at which point the type is scheduled to have begun to be replaced by 48 AW249s, which are designated by the Italian military as the AH-249. Prior to the 2017 contract, the Italian Army and Leonardo had studied options for the future of the Mangusta, the service had rejected one proposal to replace the type with an attack-orientated variant of the AgustaWestland AW149 helicopter; instead, it opted for a series of low-risk upgrades and enhancements to be applied to the existing A129 to boost its endurance, situational awareness, and information-handling capabilities as medium-term measure.

At the November 2017 Dubai Airshow, Leonardo indicated it was actively seeking partners to collaborate on the AW249 project; one speculated candidate was the state-owned Turkish Aerospace Industries, which is separately in the process of developing its own successor to the Mangusta-derived T129 ATAK helicopter, referred to as the T929 ATAK 2. In July 2018, Leonardo and the Polish Armaments Group signed a letter of intent in regards to the collaborating on a bid to supply the AW249 to meet Poland's Kruk combat helicopter programme, and speculated on the use of its PZL-Świdnik subsidiary to locally produce elements of the rotorcraft. The collaboration may encompass multiple aspects of the AW249, including the design, manufacture, and through-life support.

The original 2017 contract included a single prototype, three pre-serial examples, and the first production helicopter, all except the prototype are to be in an initial operational capability (IOC) configuration. Originally, the maiden flight of the AW249 was scheduled to be conducted sometime during 2020. On 12 August 2022, the prototype AW249 made its first flight from the company’s plant in Vergiate.

== Design ==
The Leonardo Helicopters AW249 is to be a modern attack helicopter. It is intended to be more survivable and have a greater offensive capability than the Mangusta, being provisioned for greater autonomy, as well as to use the latest available digital communications and battlefield management systems. Amongst other abilities, the mission system will be capable of remotely operating unmanned aerial vehicles (UAV)s, and incorporate numerous situational awareness aids as to reduce pilot workload and increase safety. The AW249 is to have an open architecture, easing the integration of mission systems from various suppliers with the onboard avionics. The AW249 is to be equipped with electro-optical countermeasures and other self-defence systems, such as the DIRCM (Direct InfraRed Counter Measures) ELT\577 QUIRIS and the ELT\162 radar warning receiver.

Leonardo has indicated the rotorcraft will be more stealthy than its predecessor, possessing both a reduced radar cross-section and a suppressed infrared signature. Furthermore, the AW249 is to possess lower operating costs than the A129, which is said to be achievable through the application of newer technology and design improvements. The Italian Ministry of Defence has required the incorporation of mature technologies such as the OTO Melara TM197B 20mm chin-mounted cannon, Rafael Advanced Defense Systems Toplite targeting system and Spike missile from the A129; the rotorcraft will be furnished with a flexible weapon system comprising six-wing store stations that can carry a combination of air-to-ground or air-to-air missiles, unguided/guided rockets or external fuel tanks.

An Italian Army presentation at a 2017 conference in Kraków showed a MTOW of 7–8 tonnes, higher than the 5 tonne of the AW129; it also had more than double the weapons load from 800 kg (1,800 lb) to almost 2,000 kg (4,400 lb), as well as increased cruise speed, ceiling and endurance. The majority of the dynamic elements, such as the transmission and rotors, were derived from those of the AgustaWestland AW149 medium-sized utility helicopter. Early on in development, two powerplants were considered for use on the AW249, the General Electric T700 and the Safran Aneto turboshaft engines, the latter having been recently selected for the commercial AgustaWestland AW189K. In February 2021, it was announced that the Italian Army had selected General Electric to supply its T700 engine for the AW249.

== Orders ==
=== Future operators ===
Italy
The Italian parliament approved the purchase of 48 AW249 helicopters as the replacement of its A129 helicopters.
Firm orders:
- 7 ordered in its IOC variant (Initial Operational Capacity). Note: these will be modernised as part as the third order for 29 AW 249 FOC.
- 12 ordered in its IOC variant. Note: these will be modernised as part as the third order for 29 AW 249 FOC.
- 29 planned to be ordered in 2025-2026 in its FOC variant (Final Operational Capacity).

== Specifications ==
Data from Leonardo S.p.A.

General characteristics

- Crew: two
- Capacity: 2,800 kg (6,200 lb) (weapons)
- Length: 17.63 m (57 ft 10 in)
- Wingspan: 14.60 m (47 ft 11 in)
- Width: 4.60 m (15 ft 1 in)
- Height: 4.26 m (14 ft 0 in)
- Max takeoff weight: 8,300 kg (18,298 lb)
- Powerplant: 2 × General Electric CT7-8E6 turboshaft
  Max take-off power: 2,503 shp (1,866 kW)
  Max continuous power: 2,274 shp (1,696 kW))

Performance

- Maximum speed: 287 km/h (178 mph, 155 kn) (at maximum cruise power, with an average mission weight)
- Cruise speed: 259 km/h (161 mph, 140 kn)
- Range: 796 km (495 mi, 430 nmi)
- Endurance: 4 hours 5 minutes (at maximum take-off power, with an average mission weight)
- Service ceiling: 6,100 m (20,000 ft)
- Rate of climb: 11.9 m/s (2,350 ft/min)

Armament

- Guns: Gatling gun Leonardo TM197B (with 3 × 20 mm barrels, Integrated Helmet Display System enslaved)
- Hardpoints: 6 (2 under each wing, 1 on the wingtip)
- Rockets: Hydra 70 (launchers with 7 or 19 rockets, up to 4 launchers on the hardpoints under the wings)
- Missiles: Air-to-ground: Rafael Spike ER2,or Rafael Spike LR2 (launchers with 2 or 4 missiles each, up to 4 launchers on the hardpoints under the wings)
  Air-to-air missiles: likely MBDA Italia Fulgur (up to 2 launchers with two rails launching missiles, can be installed on the 6 hardpoints)

Avionics

- Optics: observation and targeting system, pilot night vision system
- Communications: Software defined radios (civil and military), Tactical Data Link 16. LTE Gateway for tactical data transfers, wide-band Datalink for UAV control (line of sight), IFF
- Electronic warfare: full EW suite with passive / active countermeasures, anti-jamming, anti GPS-spoofing
- Human-machine: helmet display system, enhanced human machine interface, battlefield management system, integrated mission system
- Screens: 2 multi-core touchscreen large area displays (situational awareness), 4 multi-core touchscreen enhanced display control units (controlling the aircraft systems)

== See also ==
Related development

- Leonardo Helicopters AW149

Aircraft of comparable role, configuration, and era

- Bell 360 Invictus
- Boeing AH-64 Apache
- Mil Mi-28
- Changhe Z-10
- Harbin Z-21
- Kamov Ka-52
- TAI T929 ATAK 2

Related lists

- List of active Italian military aircraft
