= Fulgur (missile) =

- Type: Man-portable air-defense system
- Place of origin: Italy

Service history
- In service: Planned for early 2028
- Used by: See Operators

Production history
- Designer: MBDA Italy; MBDA
- Designed: Since 2023
- Manufacturer: MBDA Italy
- Produced: From 2026
- No. built: Production capacity > 1,000 per year

Specifications
- Mass: 10 kg (22 lb) (missile)
- Length: 1.5 m (4.9 ft)
- Diameter: 70 mm (2.8 in) (missile)
- Effective firing range: 5 km (3.1 mi)
- Engine: Rocket engine by AvioAero
- Maximum speed: Supersonic
- Guidance system: Target acquisition: electro-optic sensor with a processing unit and an IFF; Missile guidance: "Sophisticated seeker featuring image processing capabilities"
- Steering system: Canards
- Launch platform: Man-portable launcher; Vehicle-launched planned; Aircraft-launch planned

The Fulgur is a very short-range air defence system developed by MBDA for the Italian Army.

== Origins ==
The FIM-92 Stinger was approaching the end of its service life in the Italian Armed Forces in the early 2020s. Italy was considering a successor. Following the Russian invasion of Ukraine (full scale 2022), with the multiplication of aerial threats with several types of drones, Italy considered that a large quantity of systems was necessary, and launched a programme in collaboration with MBDA.

== Programme history ==
=== Project unveiled ===
In 2024, at the Farnborough Air Show, MBDA unveiled a new MANPADS, a programme that was called "VSHORAD" (very short range air defence). A mock-up of the missile was presented with the following description:

- Supersonic missile
- Fire-and-forget interceptor
- Sophisticated seeker featuring image processing capabilities
- Targets:
  - Fighters
  - Helicopters
  - Small drones
- To be integrated on current and future vehicles, with automated turrets (a Leonardo turret for the VLTM 2)
- Light and suitable for amphibious and paratrooper troops

=== Development contract ===
At the Paris Air Show in June 2025, MBDA and the Italian Army signed a contract for its development. The missile's name ("Fulgur") was unveiled. And additional characteristics were unveiled. A goal for its introduction was set for early 2028. And additional characteristics were unveiled:

- All-weather capabilities
- Integration to the SkyWarden C-UAS system.

== Design and production ==
There is an expected production capacity of at least 1,000 missiles per year.

The supply chain and assembly are expected to be done in the following way:

- The rocket engine will be supplied by AvioAero.
- The seeker will be designed and produced by MBDA Italy at the Fusaro facility.
- The warhead is to be supplied by a third party. If the supplier is European, TDW and Saab Bofors Dynamics Switzerland could be selected.
- The assembly will be made in house, but the facility has yet to be selected.

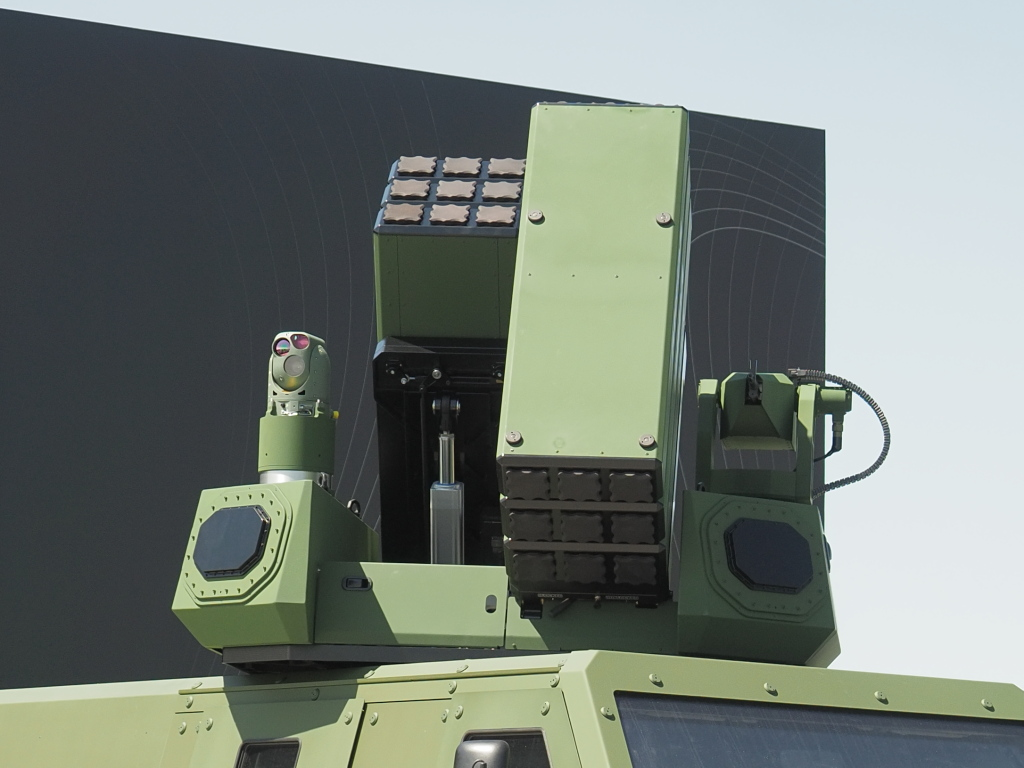
MBDA SkyWarden NNbS, with another missile (DefendAir)

== Variants ==
=== Planned variants ===
Two variants have yet been mentioned by MBDA and the Italian Army:

- a MANPADS
- a vehicle launched variants:
  - Leonardo turret
  - MBDA SkyWarden C-UAS system.

=== Potential variants ===
- Discussions to integrate the missile on the attack helicopter AW249 Fenice.

== Operators ==
=== Future operators ===
Italy
Development contract signed in June 2025.
