= Rolls-Royce Gem =

1970s British turboshaft aircraft engine

Gem
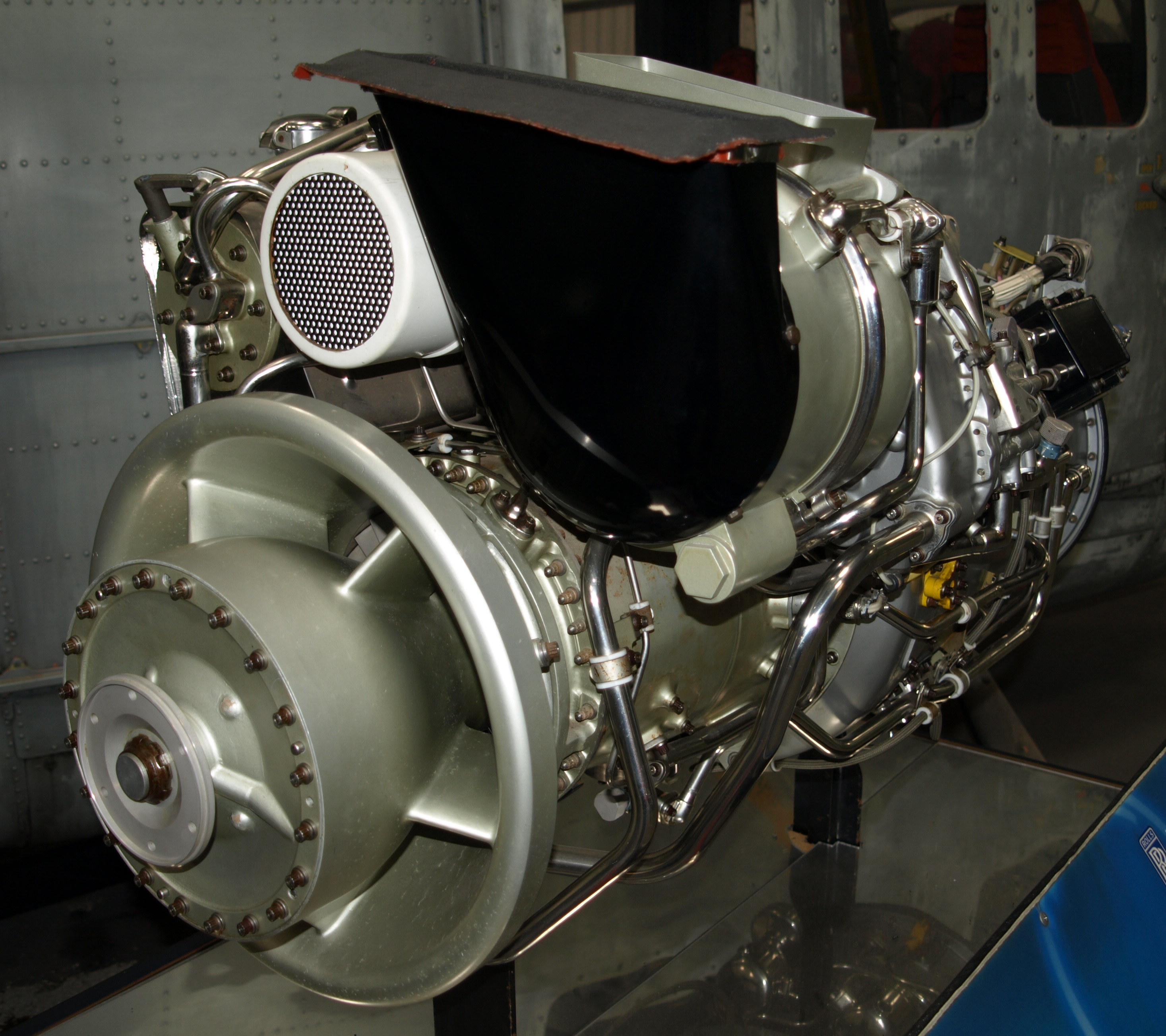
- Rolls-Royce Gem at The Helicopter Museum (Weston)
- Type: Turboshaft
- National origin: United Kingdom
- Manufacturer: Rolls-Royce Limited
- Major applications: Westland Lynx

The Rolls-Royce Gem is a turboshaft engine developed specifically for the Westland Lynx helicopter in the 1970s. The design started off at de Havilland Engine division (hence the name starting with "G") and passed to Bristol Siddeley as the BS.360. Rolls-Royce bought out Bristol Siddeley in 1966 and after it dropped the Bristol Siddeley identity the engine became the RS.360.

== Design and development ==
The Gem's three-shaft engine configuration is rather unusual for turboshaft/turboprop engines. Basic arrangement is a four-stage axial LP (Low Pressure) compressor, driven by a single stage LP turbine, supercharging a centrifugal HP (High Pressure) compressor, driven by a single stage HP turbine. Power from a two-stage free (power) turbine is delivered to the load via a third shaft. A reverse flow combustor is featured.

The Gem 42 develops 1,000 shp (750 kW) at Take-off, Sea Level Static, ISA, but the Maximum Contingency Rating (MCR) is 1,120 shp (840 kW).

Until recently all versions of the Lynx have been Gem powered. However, now that Rolls-Royce owns Allison, it has been marketing the more modern LHTEC T800, developed jointly with Honeywell.

== Applications ==
- Agusta A129 Mangusta
- Westland Lynx

== Engines on display ==
- East Midlands Aeropark
- Midland Air Museum
- The Helicopter Museum (Weston)
- 111 (Sunderland) Squadron ATC
- South Yorkshire Aircraft Museum

== Specifications (Gem 42) ==
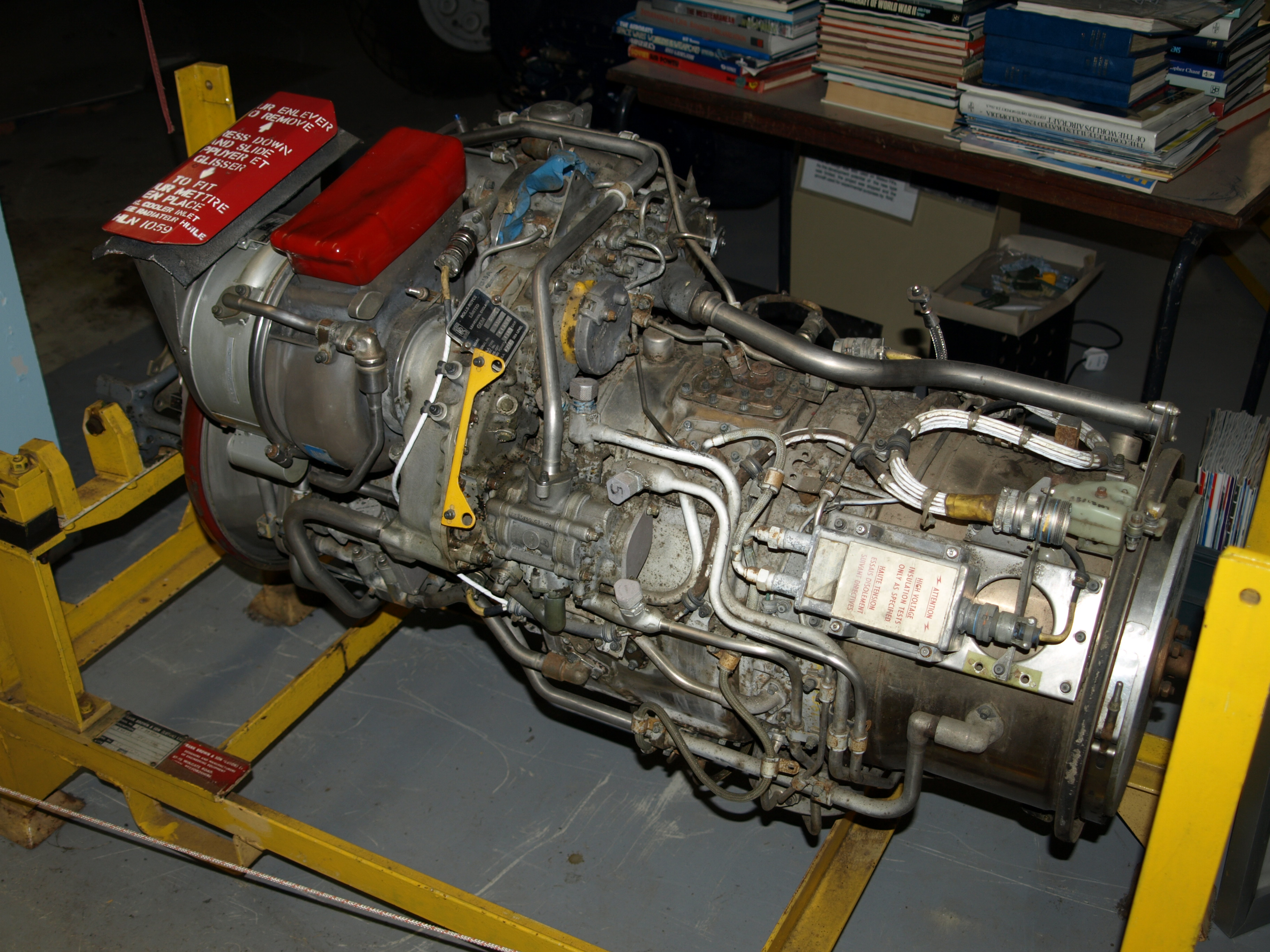
Rolls-Royce Gem on display at the Midland Air Museum

Data from Rolls-Royce

==== General characteristics ====
- Type: Triple-shaft two-spool turboshaft
- Length: 43.4 in (1090 mm)
- Diameter: 23.5 in (590 mm)
- Dry weight: 414 lb (187 kg)

==== Components ====
- Compressor: 4-stage axial LP, single-stage centrifugal HP
- Turbine: 2-stage power turbine, single-stage LP, single-stage HP

==== Performance ====
- Maximum power output: 1,000 shp (746 kW)
- Overall pressure ratio: 12:1
- Air mass flow: 7 lb/sec

== See also ==
Comparable engines

- Bristol Siddeley Nimbus
- Rolls-Royce Gnome

Related lists

- List of aircraft engines
