= Agusta A129 Mangusta =

Family of attack helicopters by Agusta, later AgustaWestland

A129 Mangusta
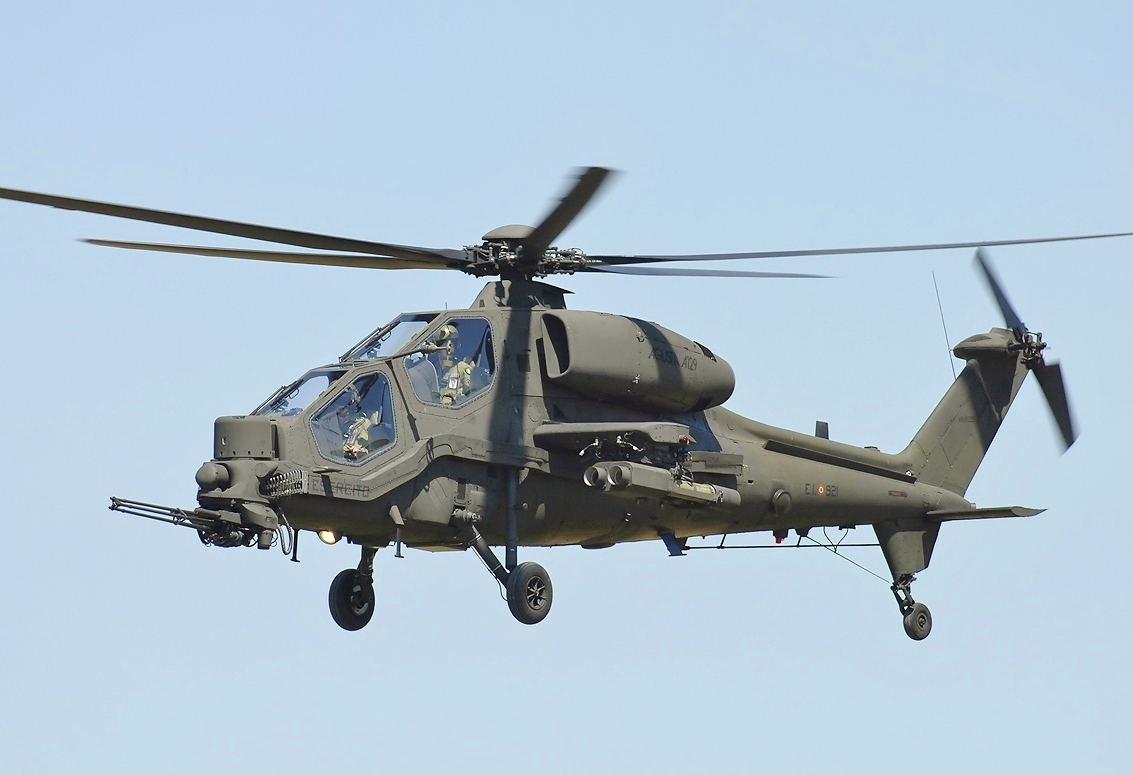
- The Agusta A129 Mangusta over Lugo, Emilia-Romagna

General information
- Type: Attack helicopter
- National origin: Italy
- Manufacturer: Agusta
- Status: In service
- Primary user: Italian Army
- Number built: 60 (+7 prototypes and demonstrators)

History
- Introduction date: 1990
- First flight: 11 September 1983
- Developed into: TAI/AgustaWestland T129 ATAK

The Agusta A129 Mangusta (English: Mongoose) is an attack helicopter originally designed and produced by Italian company Agusta. It is the first attack helicopter to be designed and produced wholly in Europe. It has continued to be developed by AgustaWestland, the successor company to Agusta. It has been exclusively operated by the Italian Army, which introduced the type to service during 1990.

The A129 has undergone several combat deployments, seeing use in Somalia, Afghanistan, and Iraq. It has proven well suited to operating in hot climates, as well as quite flexible in the field. The original 60 rotorcraft have been upgraded multiple times since entering service with the Italian Army; improvements have included compatibility with additional munitions, new targeting systems, improved avionics, better data-handling, and a more powerful transmission. Various improvements and export models have been proposed, including dedicated naval and reconnaissance variants. The TAI/AgustaWestland T129 ATAK derivative has been developed by Turkish Aerospace Industries in cooperation with AgustaWestland for the Turkish Army as well as other services and export customers. Since 2017, work has been underway on a larger successor to the A129 for the Italian Army, the Leonardo Helicopters AW249.

== Development ==
=== Origins ===
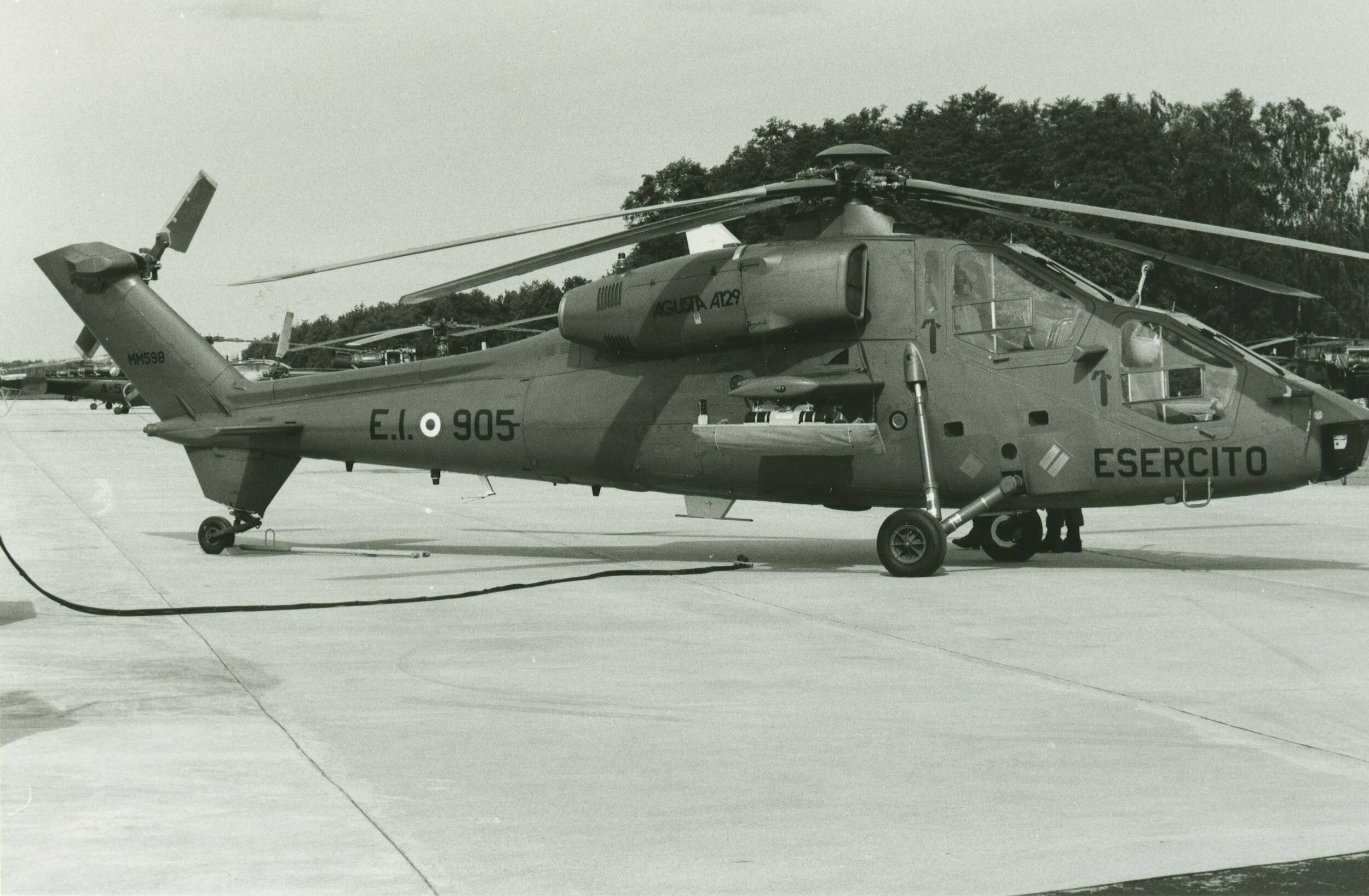
Early production A129

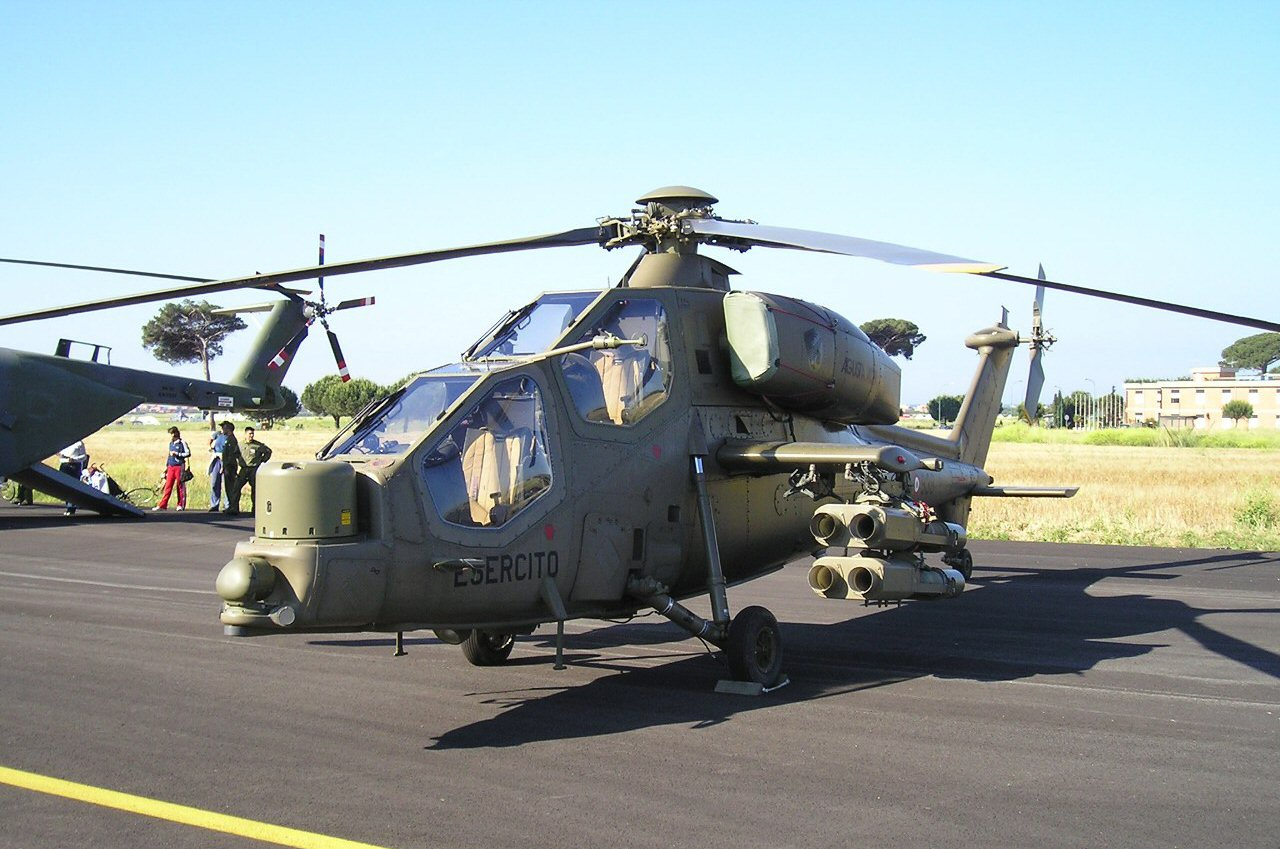
An A129 Mangusta of the Italian Army. Note that in its original configuration the Mangusta lacked the 20mm TM197B gun turret.

In 1972, the Italian Army began forming a requirement for a light observation and anti-tank helicopter; one prominent factor in shaping this requirement was the need to address the threat posed by the extensive military assets in operation with the Warsaw Pact countries and those of the Soviet Union. Around the same time as the Italian efforts were underway, the West German military had also identified a similar need. The two nations' parallel requirements ultimately led to a joint project being initiated between the Italian company Agusta and West German company MBB; however, this cooperative effort did not last long, and was dissolved shortly after preliminary work had been undertaken. Agusta had initially studied the development of a combat-oriented derivative of its existing A109 helicopter, however the company decided to proceed with the development of a more ambitious helicopter design.

In 1978, Agusta formally began the design process on what would become the A129. On 11 September 1983, the first of five A129 prototypes made the type's maiden flight; the fifth prototype would first fly in March 1986. Around the same time, the Italian Army placed an order for a total of 60 A129s. At one stage, a total of 100 attack helicopters had been planned to be purchased but this was slashed to 60 A129s. Another version of the type was to be capable of hauling eight troops in addition to its firepower capabilities; this variant, referred to sometimes as the A139, never got off the ground. According to defence publication Jane's Information Group, by 1985, the A129 was considered to be a comparable attack helicopter to the American-built McDonnell Douglas AH-64 Apache, and showed potential on the export market.

=== Export market ===
During the 1980s, Agusta sought to partner with Westland Helicopters to develop a common light attack helicopter, other prospective manufacturing participants in the joint initiative included Fokker and Construcciones Aeronáuticas SA. In 1986, the governments of Italy, the Netherlands, Spain and the United Kingdom signed a memorandum of understanding to investigate an improved version of the A129, alternatively called the Joint European Helicopter Tonal or Light Attack Helicopter (LAH). By 1988, feasibility studies for four different options had been conducted for the LAH, these would have between 80 per cent and 20 per cent growth over the initial A129; both single-engine and twin-engine configurations were examined using various new powerplants, as well as a new rotor system, retractable landing gear, improved sensors and more powerful armament. However, the LAH project collapsed in 1990 following Britain and the Netherlands independently deciding to withdraw from the program and eventually procure the AH-64 Apache instead.

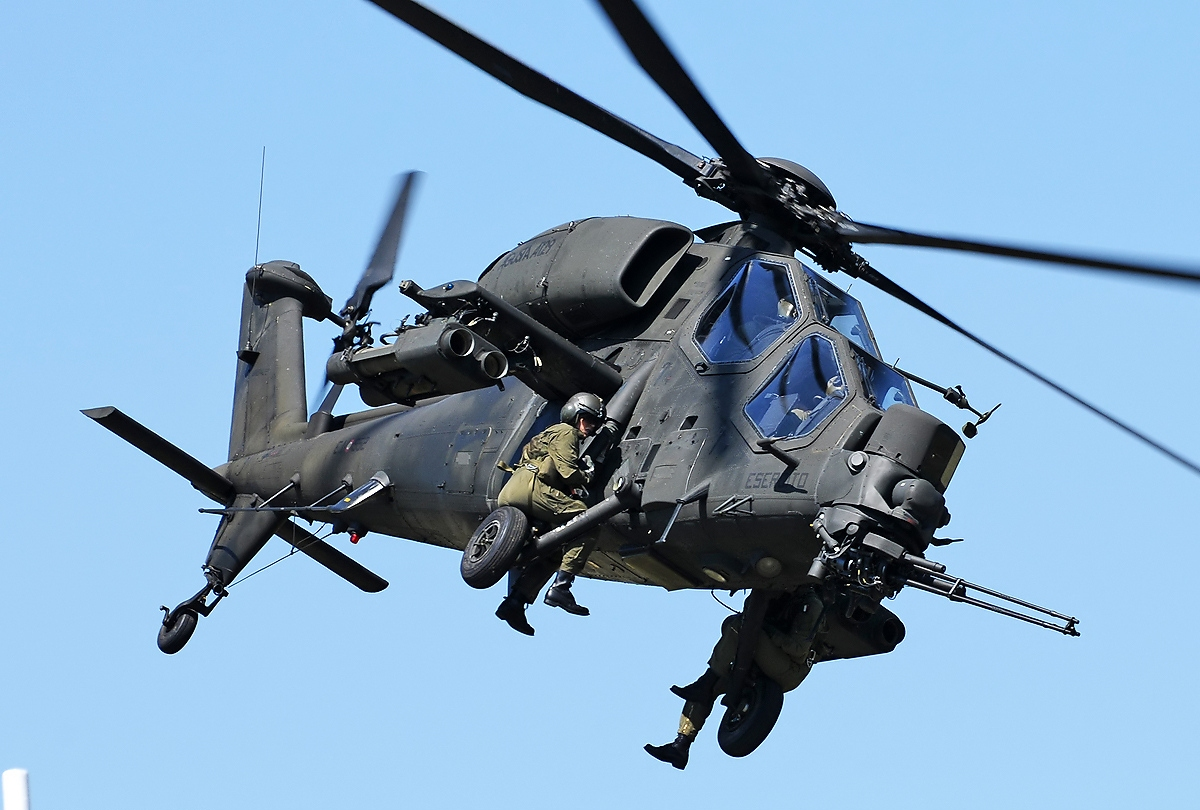
An A129 in flight, with personnel riding on the landing gear

Agusta retained its interest in pursuing export sales and decided to proceed with the development of the A129 International, or A129I; this was a dedicated and upgraded version of the A129 intended for export customers. The A129I featured a five-bladed main rotor (early production aircraft had employed a four-bladed main rotor), a pair of LHTEC T800 engines (replacing the Rolls-Royce Gem engines of Italian Army Mangustas) and an upgraded transmission; the A129I were also provisioned with new weapons and electronic warfare systems. In 1998, the Italian Army had decided to upgrade a portion of their A129 fleet with many of the A129I's systems, the first of the remanufactured helicopters was delivered in 2002. In September 2007, the A129I was formally redesignated as the AW129.

During the Australian Army's AIR 87 project to procure a new Armed Reconnaissance Helicopter fleet, the Agusta A129 was one of the contenders; it was one of the three attack helicopters, alongside the AH-64 Apache and the Eurocopter Tiger, to be short-listed out of the six tenders submitted. In December 2001, Australia announced its selection of the Eurocopter Tiger as the winning bid.

Turkey had sought a new attack helicopter since the 1990s to replace their diminished Bell AH-1 Cobra and Bell AH-1 SuperCobra fleets. Following a highly protracted selection process, in September 2007, an order was issued for 51 TAI/AgustaWestland T129 ATAK helicopters, a variant of the A129 International. As a part of the deal with AgustaWestland, Turkish defense firm TAI acquired the rights for future manufacturing of the T129; in addition to production for local purposes, TAI also manufacture the T129 for export customers. Various components and avionics systems are intended to be replaced with indigenously produced systems as they are developed.

== Design ==
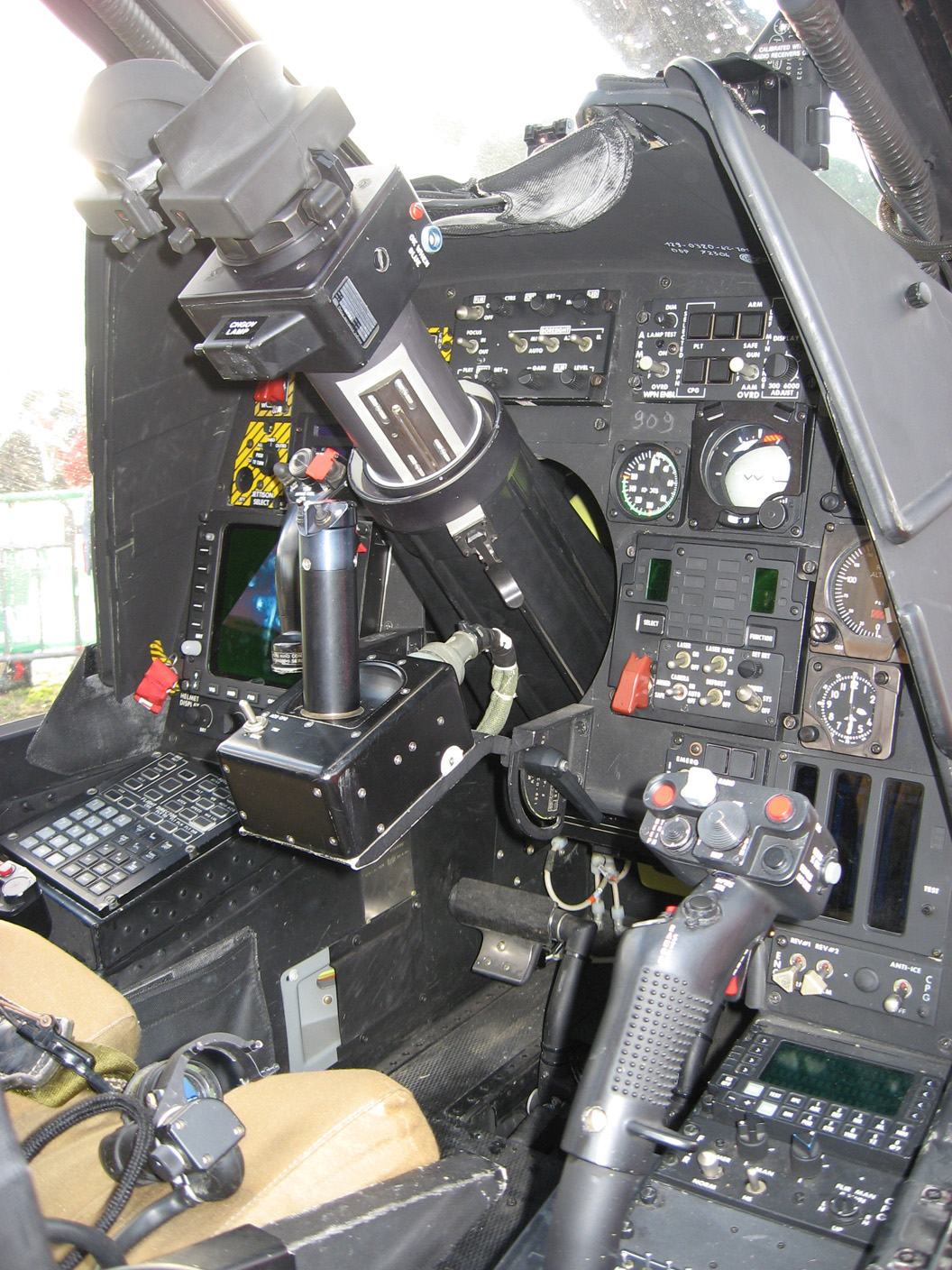
The gunner's position in the cockpit of an A129. Note the weapons scope and targeting controls present.

The A129 Mangusta is the first European attack helicopter. As such it has several original aspects to its design, such as being the first helicopter to make use of a fully computerised integrated management system to reduce crew workload. It was decided that much of the helicopter's functionality was to be automated; as such, parts of the flight and armament systems are monitored and directly controlled by onboard computers. The A129 shares considerable design similarities to Agusta's earlier A109 utility helicopter: the rear section of the A129 was derived from the A109 and incorporated to an entirely new forward section. The A129's fuselage is highly angular and armoured for ballistic protection. The composite rotor blades are also able to withstand hits from 23mm cannon fire. The two man crew, comprising a pilot and gunner, sit in a conventional tandem cockpit.

The A129 is able to be operated in various capacities, including to perform anti-armour, armed reconnaissance, ground attack, escort, fire support and anti-aircraft missions. For the anti-ground mission the helicopter may employ a combination of various armaments, including up to eight Hellfire missiles. By 2014, the Spike-ER, a fourth-generation anti-tank missile, had been added to the A129's arsenal. In the air-to-air role, the Mistral missile could be equipped; furthermore, the FIM-92 Stinger missile was certified for use in 2003. The A129 can also be equipped with 81 mm or 70 mm (2.75 in) unguided rockets housed in pods as well as 12.7mm machine gun pods; later models also feature a M197 three-barrel 20 mm cannon that is installed onto a nose-mounted Oto Melara TM-197B turret.

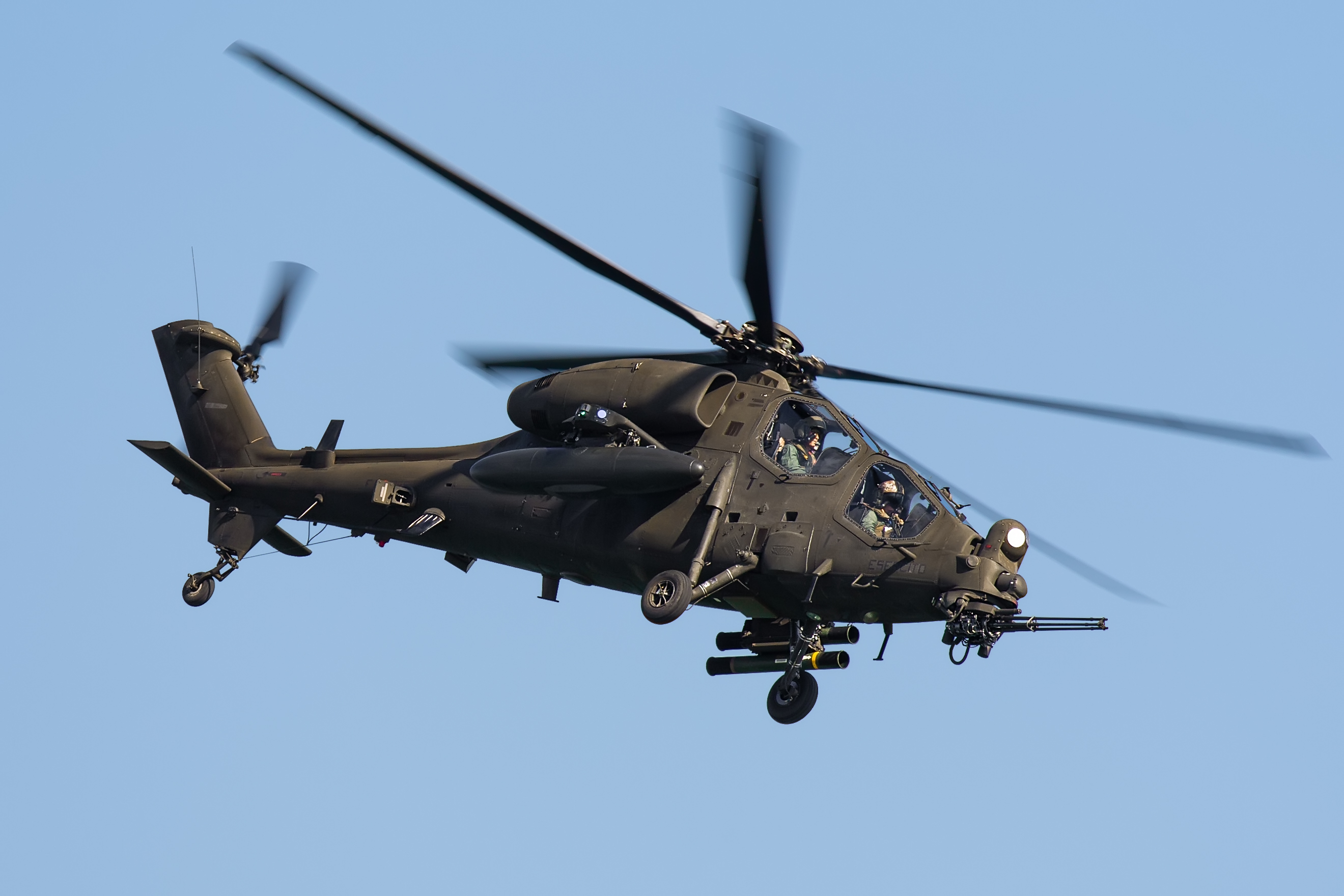
A129D flying demo at Jesolo airshow, 2022

Power is provided by a pair of Rolls-Royce Gem 2-1004D turboshaft engines. Features of this engine includes automatic engine management and simplified controls for ease of operation, along with a relatively brief start-up interval and a comparatively low specific fuel consumption. Newer variants benefit from improvements such as an improved transmission. One key feature present on the engines is the incorporation of infrared suppressors, which act to reduce the aircraft's heat signature and thereby improve survivability. One of the key protective measures incorporated onto the A129 include the electronic warfare and SIAP (Single Integrated Air Picture) self-protection suite. Elements of the mission interface systems and the onboard software integrated onto later aircraft were produced by Selex Galileo.

The A129 is equipped with infrared night vision systems and is capable of operating at day or night in all-weather conditions. Laser systems are fitted onto newer aircraft for range-finding and target designation purposes, the A129 can laser-designate targets for other friendly aircraft to attack. On the AW129D, Rafael Advanced Defense Systems's Toplite III sight is used as the primary targeting system; it is able to act as a FLIR and has both manual and automatic target tracking modes, Toplite also provides a greater detection and identification range than the 1970s era HeliTOW sensor it replaced. In 1998, Israel Aircraft Industries (IAI) formally partnered with Agusta to offer various avionics and weapons upgrades to potential A129 operators; various IAI technologies have since been proposed and implemented on Italian A129s.

== Operational history ==
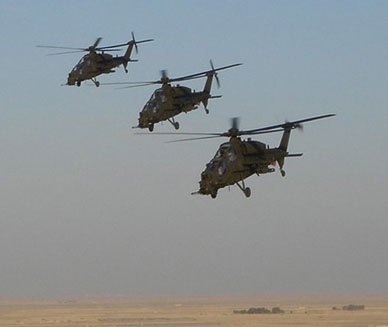
Three A129s in Iraq

The Italian Army would receive a total of 60 A129 helicopters, deliveries of the type began in 1990. In 1999, AgustaWestland received a contract to produce the last batch of 15 A129s to the new combat CBT configuration; in late 2001, the Italian Army opted to have all of their A129s retrofitted to the improved A129 CBT standard. In 2011, AgustaWestland was part-way through modifying a total of 24 A129s to the new ARH-129D aerial reconnaissance standard, as well as the manufacturing of a further 24 new-built ARH-129Ds for the Italian Army.

In Italian service, the Mangusta has successfully deployed on several United Nations missions in nations such as the Republic of Macedonia, Somalia and Angola. The A-129 proved to be suitable in the peacekeeping role and well-suited to operations in hot climates; the type was reported to have been highly reliable and extremely flexible during the deployment to Somalia.

Three A129 helicopters were deployed in Iraq to provide air support for the Italian forces in Nassiriya. Several A129s have also been stationed in Afghanistan to support in-theatre operations by Italian and allied forces. In November 2014, the latest variant of the A129, the AW-129D, was deployed to Afghanistan for the first time.

In January 2015, the Italian Army opted for an enhancement package their existing A129s. These upgrades, which are to enter service prior to 2020, largely focused on increasing the A129's endurance, speed, situational awareness, and information-handling capabilities; other goals included a reduction in pilot workload and integrating the aircraft with future tactical UAVs. A revealed alternative that was considered and rejected was the replacement of the type with an attack-orientated variant of the newer AgustaWestland AW149 helicopter, upgrading the existing A129s was considered to be less risky and time-consuming. However, on 17 January 2017, it was announced that Italy had signed a €487 million ($515 million) contract with Leonardo for the development of a dedicated successor to the A129, the Leonardo Helicopters AW249; this shall incorporate numerous mature systems present on the A129.

In March 2016, the Italian government announced that it was deploying four A129 attack helicopters and four NHIndustries NH90 transport helicopters along with 130 personnel to the Kurdistan region of Iraq to perform combat search and rescue mission as part of a multinational effort to help combat Islamic State militants within the region and specifically to protect the Mosul Dam.

By 2018, it was reported that the total number of A129s still operational had fallen to 32.

== Variants ==
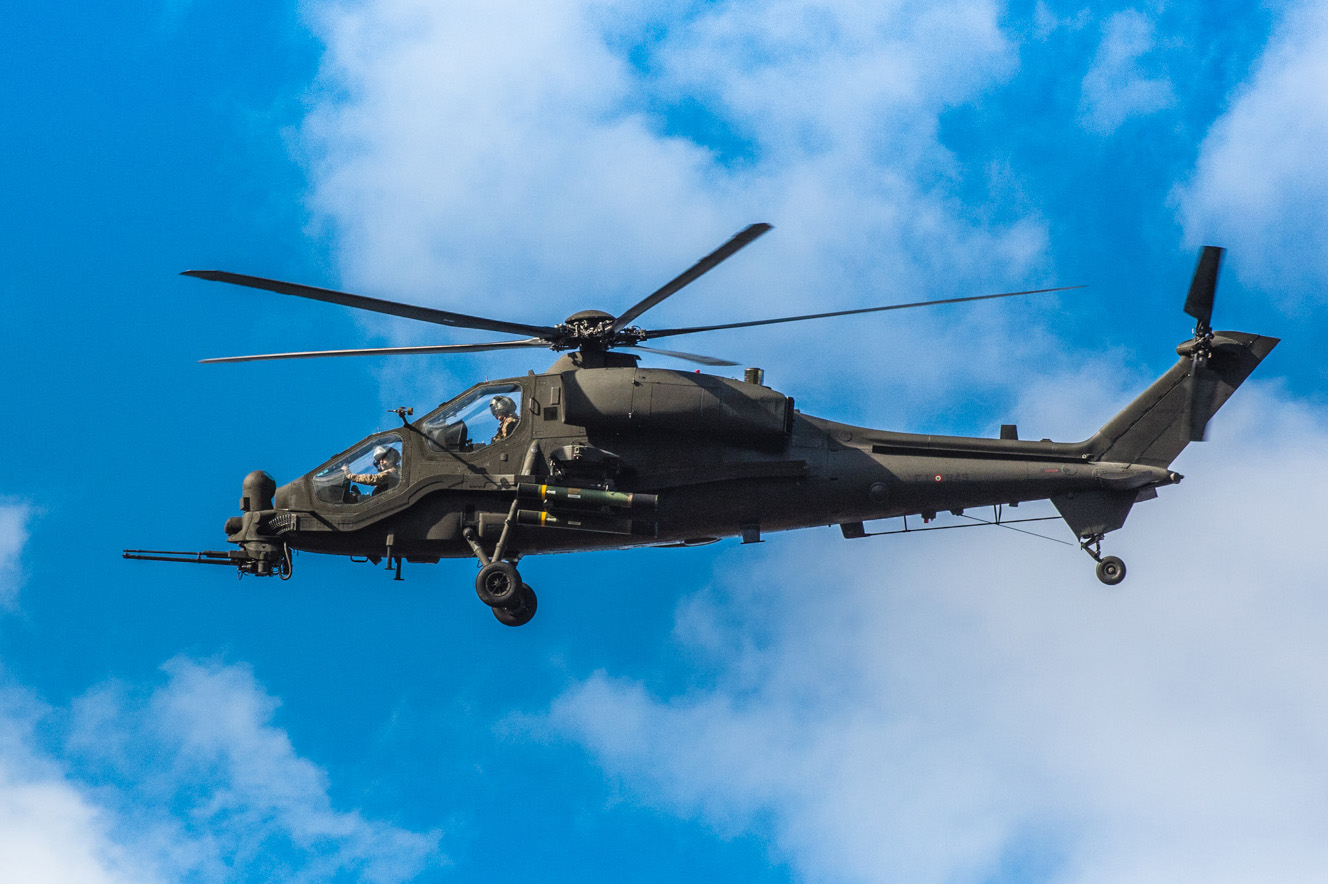
Agusta A129D Mangusta profile

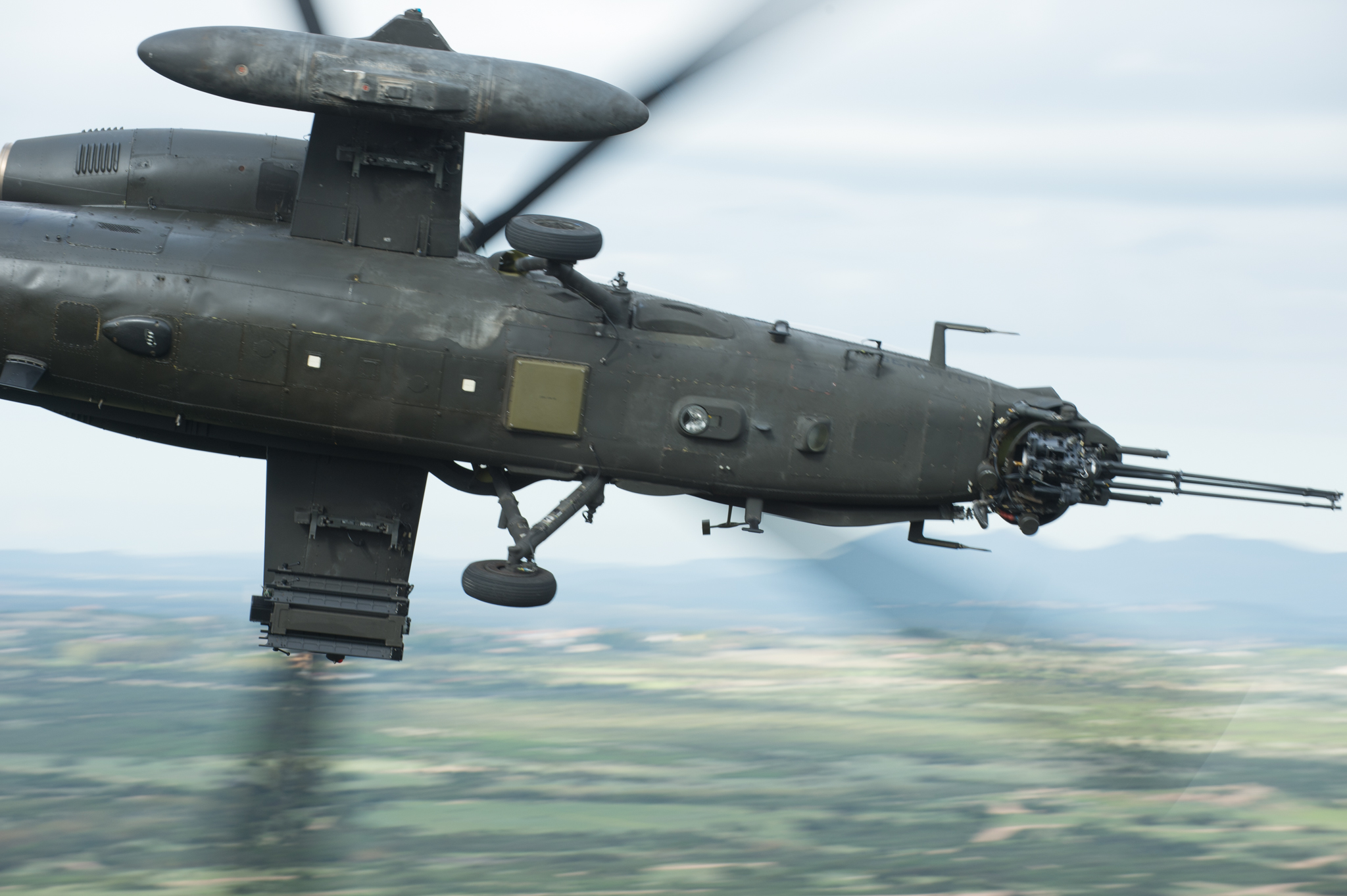
Agusta A129D Mangusta underside

=== Production models ===
A129 Mangusta

Original production version, powered by two Rolls-Royce Gem 2 turboshaft engines. Maximum takeoff weight of 4,100 kg; 45 built for the Italian Army.

A129 International

Upgraded version developed for export with more powerful LHTEC T800 turboshafts; in its final configuration, it had a five-bladed main rotor, an improved transmission, a M197 gatling cannon in a customized OTO Melara TM-197B nose turret, improved avionics and support for Hellfire anti-tank missiles and Stinger air-to-air missiles. Maximum takeoff weight of 5,000 kg.

A129 CBT / A129C

Upgraded "Combat" (CBT) version for the Italian Army incorporating most of the features of the A129 International but retaining the original Gem turboshaft engines (although an uprated transmission system is fitted); its main anti-tank weapon remains the TOW missile; it can be equipped with auxiliary fuel tanks for extended range and Stinger missiles for escort duties. Maximum takeoff weight of 4,600 kg; 15 built for the Italian Army, plus all 45 standard A129s later upgraded to A129C standard.

A129D (AgustaWestland AW129D)

Updated version of the A129C with improved avionics, comprising multifunctional displays, and a new Rafael TopLite III optronic system in place of the original Saab HeliTow unit; the TOW missiles are replaced by the much more modern and capable Spike-ER and AGM-114 Hellfire missiles. Maximum takeoff weight of 4,600 kg; 32 A129C have been upgraded to the A129D standard.

T129 ATAK

Turkish attack helicopter based on the A129 International, featuring Turkish-made avionics and weaponry. According to one source AgustaWestland designation of its first prototype is AgustaWestland AW729 —Ed.

=== Proposed models ===
A129 LBH

Proposed multipurpose assault version with a new cabin structure completely with space for carrying eight troops in addition to the two crew. The abbreviation LBH stands for Light Battlefield Helicopter. This version was designated A139 by Agusta.

A129 Multi-Role

Proposed multi-mission version, not built.

A129 Scout

Proposed reconnaissance version, not built.

A129 Shipboard

Proposed naval version, not built.

Tonal

Proposed derivative for Italy, the Netherlands, Spain, and United Kingdom, with more powerful engines, a new rotor system, retractable landing gear, improved sensors, and more powerful armament. Cancelled in 1990.

=== Military designations ===
AH-129A
Italian military designation for the A129 from 2012.
AH-129C
Italian military designation for the A129C from 2012.
AH-129D
Italian military designation for the A129D from 2012.

The A129 in Italian Army service has been designated as EA-1 (Elicottero d'Attacco - Attack Helicopter 1), later changed to EC-1 (Elicottero da Combattimento - Combat Helicopter 1) and ultimately to EES-1 (Elicottero da Esplorazione e Scorta - Scout and Escort Helicopter 1).

== Operators ==
Italy

- Italian Army - 60 purchased as of December 2016, with 32 operational AH-129Ds in service and 16 AH-129Cs used for training as of 2018.

== Specifications (A129) ==

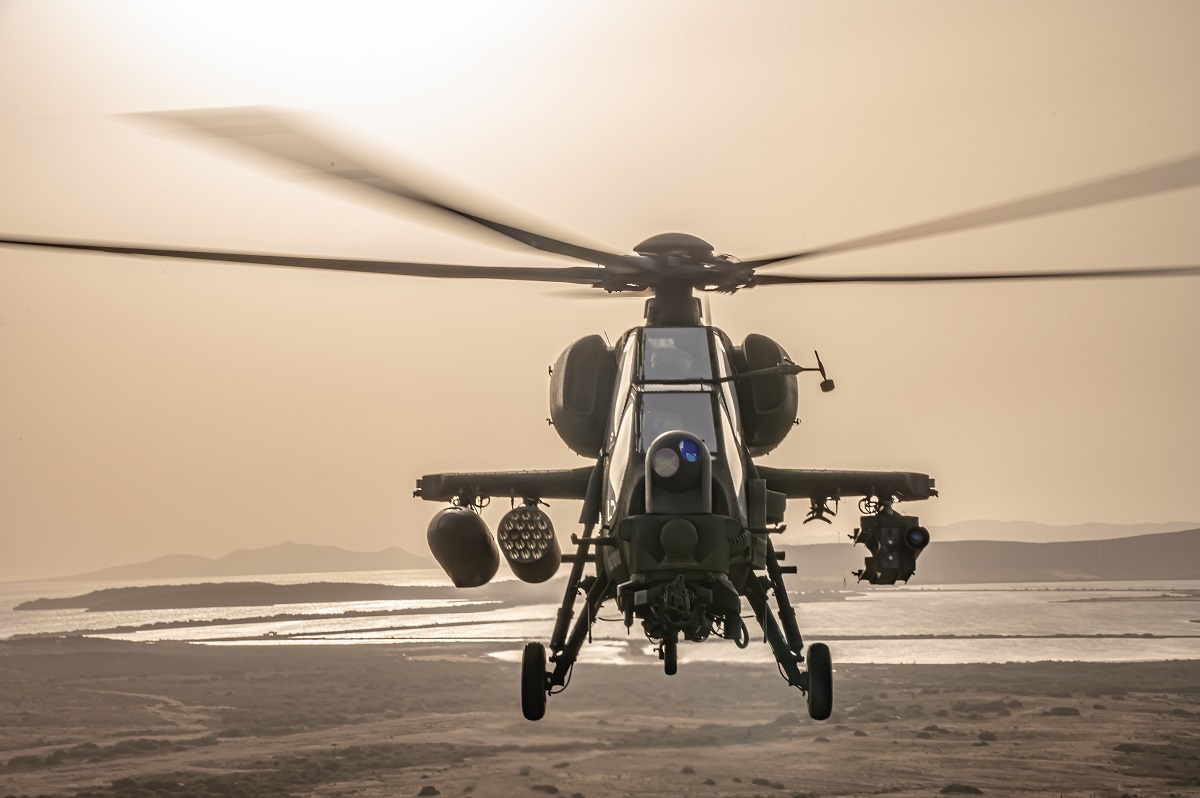
Italian Army 5th Army Aviation Regiment "Rigel" AH-129D Mangusta armed with (from left to a right) an external fuel tank, an empty M261 rocket pod, and a missile launcher with 1× Spike-ER anti-tank guided missile

External videos
- Documentary discussing the A129
- A129 performing acrobatic manoeuvers
- Display flight of an A129

Data from AgustaWestland A129 Technical Data, Twenty First Century Military Helicopters, Jane's Aviation Review

General characteristics

- Crew: 2
- Length: 12.28 m (40 ft 3 in)
- Height: 3.35 m (11 ft 0 in)
- Empty weight: 2,530 kg (5,578 lb)
- Max takeoff weight: 4,600 kg (10,141 lb)
- Powerplant: 2 × Rolls-Royce Gem 2-1004D (license built by Piaggio) turboshaft engines, 664 kW (890 hp) each
- Main rotor diameter: 11.9 m (39 ft 1 in)
- Main rotor area: 111.2 m^{2} (1,197 sq ft) 5-bladed main rotor

Performance

- Maximum speed: 278 km/h (173 mph, 150 kn)
- Cruise speed: 229 km/h (142 mph, 124 kn)
- Range: 510 km (320 mi, 280 nmi)
- Ferry range: 1,000 km (620 mi, 540 nmi)
- Service ceiling: 4,725 m (15,502 ft)
- Rate of climb: 10.2 m/s (2,010 ft/min)

Armament

- Guns:
  - 1× 20 mm (0.787 in) M197 three-barrel Gatling-type cannon (500 rounds) in a TM197B Light Turreted Gun System (CBT version)
- Hardpoints:
  - 4× Hardpoints with a capacity of
  - 1500 kg (3,307 lb), with provisions to carry combinations of:
  - Rockets:
    - 4× M260 rocket pods (each 7× 70 mm (2.75 in) Hydra 70 unguided rockets
    - 4× M261 rocket pods (each 19× 70 mm (2.75 in) Hydra 70 unguided rockets
  - Missiles:
    - 2× missile launchers on each outboard hardpoint with up to 4× BGM-71 TOW, AGM-114 Hellfire or Spike-ER anti-tank guided missiles per launchers
    - 2× missile launchers on each outboard hardpoint with up to 2× AIM-92 Stinger anti-aircraft missiles
  - Other:
    - 2× FN Herstal ETNA TMP-5 pods with 2× 7.62 mm (.30 in) FN MAG 58P machine guns (each 500 rounds)
    - 2× FN-Herstal HMP-400LC pods with 1× 12.7 mm (.50 in) M2 machine gun (400 rounds)
    - 2× external fuel tanks (220 Liter (52.8 gal)

== See also ==
Related development

- Agusta A109
- TAI/AgustaWestland T129 ATAK
- Leonardo Helicopters AW249

Aircraft of comparable role, configuration, and era

- AgustaWestland Apache
- Bell AH-1 SuperCobra
- Boeing AH-64 Apache
- Denel Rooivalk
- Eurocopter Tiger
- HAL Prachand
- Kamov Ka-50
- Kawasaki OH-1
- Mil Mi-28

Related lists

- List of attack aircraft
- List of helicopters
