= 31st Wing (Italy) =

Unit of the Italian Air Force

The 31st Wing "Carmelo Raiti" (Italian: 31º Stormo "Carmelo Raiti") is a unit of the Italian Air Force.

It assumed its current designation in 1936.

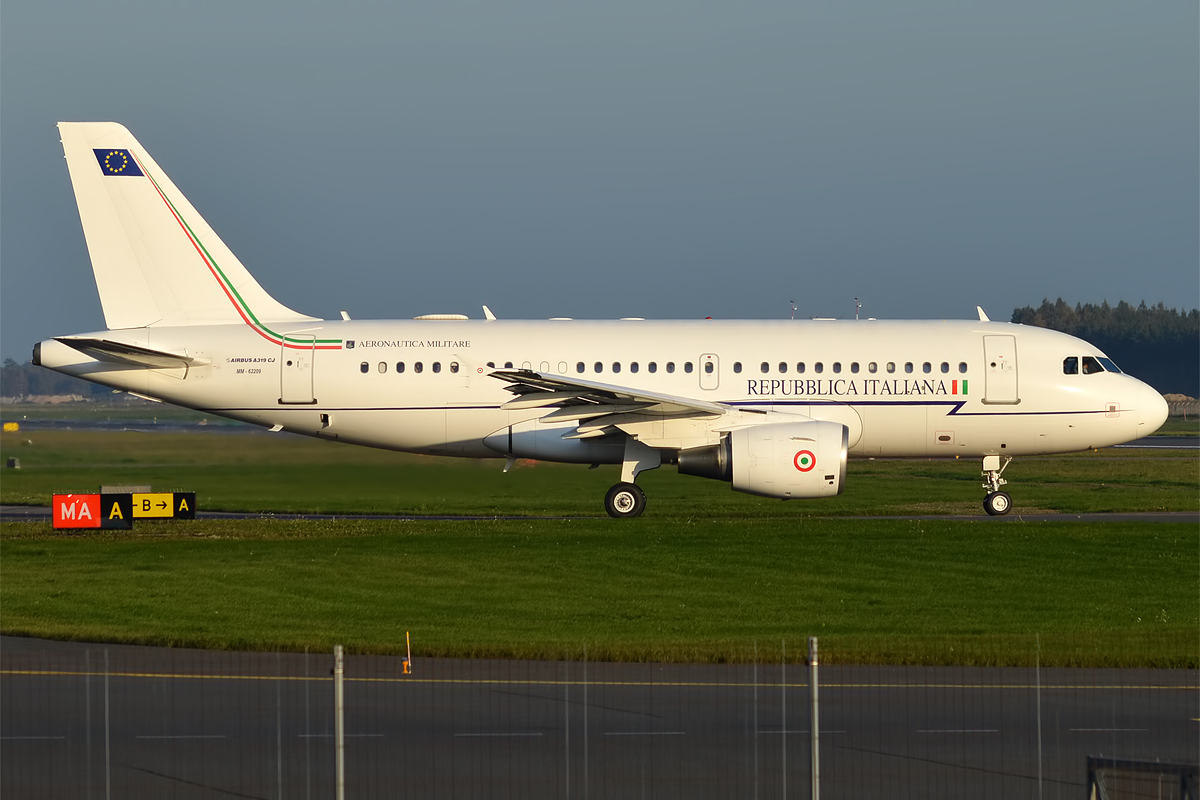
Airbus VC-319A - 31st Wing, Italian Air Force

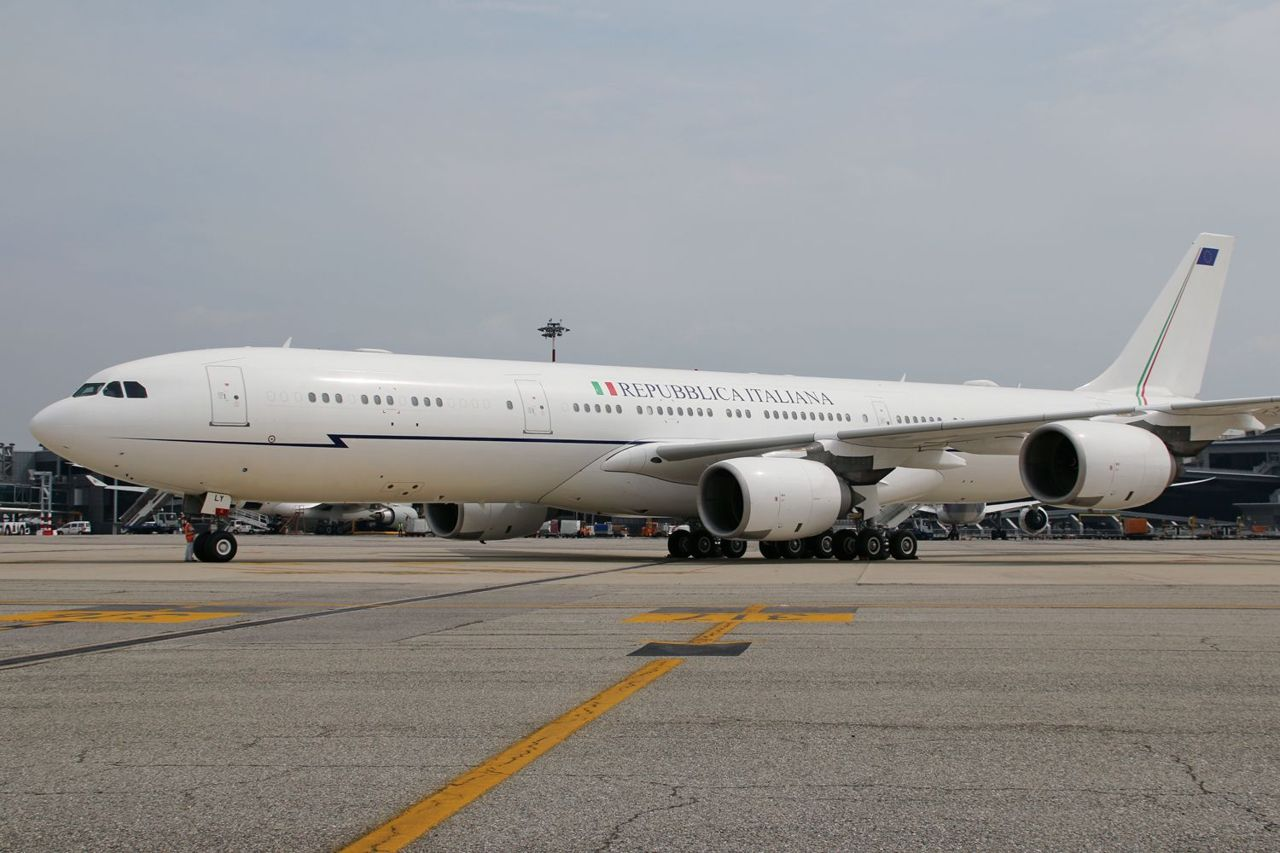
Airbus A340-541 - 31st Wing, Italian Air Force

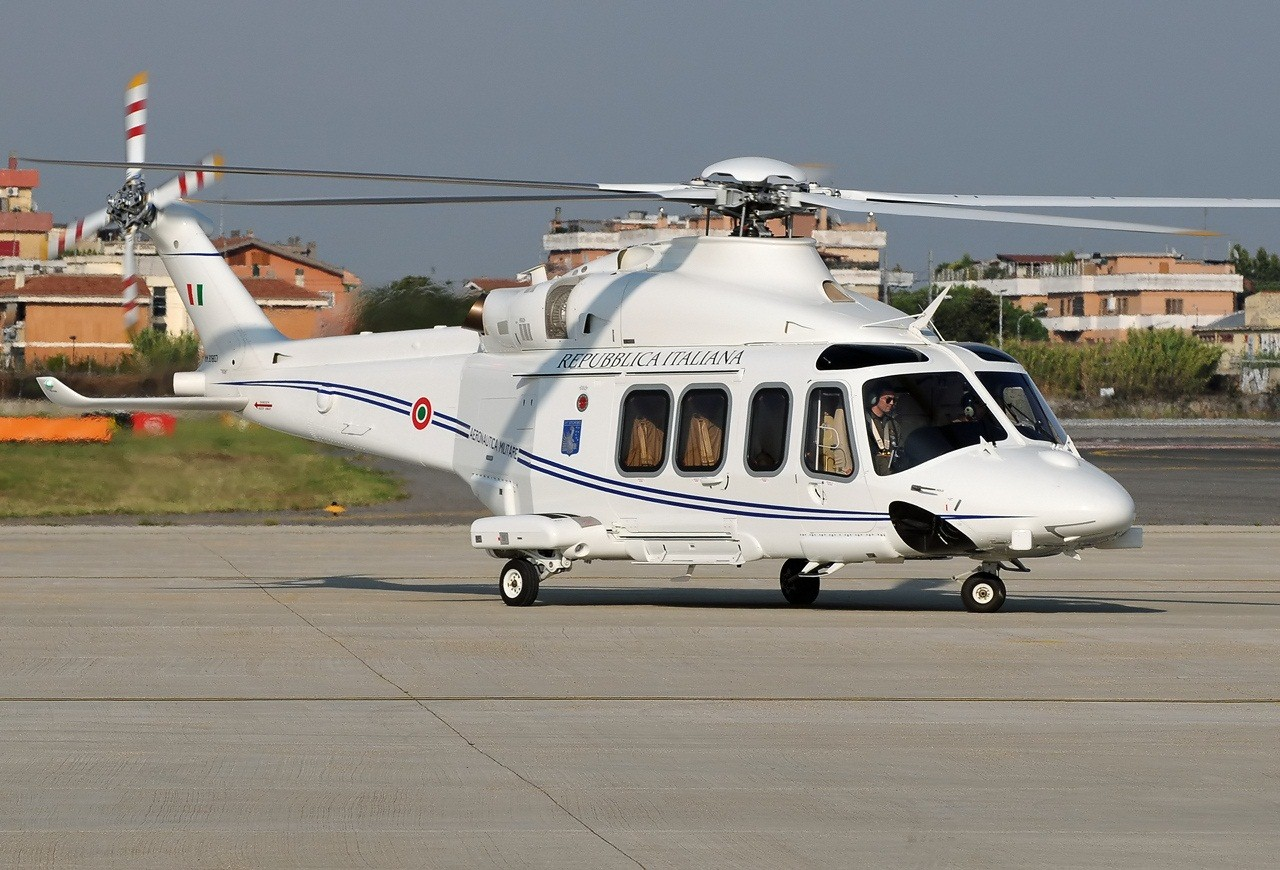
Augusta Westland VH-139A - 31st Wing, Italian Air Force Gulfstream Aerospace VC-650A - 31st Wing, Italian Air Force

== Mission ==
It has two different institutional missions:

- VVIP transportation (highest state and military authorities).
- hospital, emergency and humanitarian flights including transportation of severely traumatized people, organs for transplantation, medical teams and equipments and public utility missions in general.

The 31st Wing is based at Ciampino Air Base, 12 kilometres (7.5 mi) away from Rome.

== Fleet ==
The 31st Wing fleet is composed of these aircraft:

- 3 aircraft Airbus ACJ319 (Italian Air Force designation: VC-319A) MM62174 - MM62209 - MM62243
- 3 aircraft Dassault Falcon 900 (VC-900) MM62210 - MM62244 - MM62245
- 2 aircraft Dassault Falcon 50 (VC-50) MM62026 - MM62029
- 2 helicopters AgustaWestland AW139 (VH-139A) MM81806 - MM81807

An Airbus A340-541 I-TALY was leased until 2018. It operated out of Rome Fiumicino International Airport because of runway restrictions at Ciampino.

From April 2025, the Falcons are being replaced by five Gulfstream G650ERs (VC-650A).

== See also ==
- List of air transports of heads of state and government
