= Single Integrated Air Picture =

The SIAP (Single Integrated Air Picture) is the "air track" component of the common operational picture and common tactical picture. The program to create SIAP was established in 1998. It will allow U.S. military service personnel and allies to share a single graphical representation of the battlespace. This will be accomplished using data generated by multiple land, surface and air sensors and broadcast via a sophisticated logistical information distribution system. Once established, the SIAP will help users make better, more informed decisions by linking military forces and their tactical situations.

SIAP is the product of fused, common, continuous, unambiguous tracks of all airborne objects in the surveillance area. Each object within the SIAP has one, and only one, track number and set of associated characteristics. The SIAP is developed from near-real-time and real-time data, and is scalable and filterable to support situation awareness, battle management, and target engagements.
