= Deck lock =

System for securing a helicopter to a deck

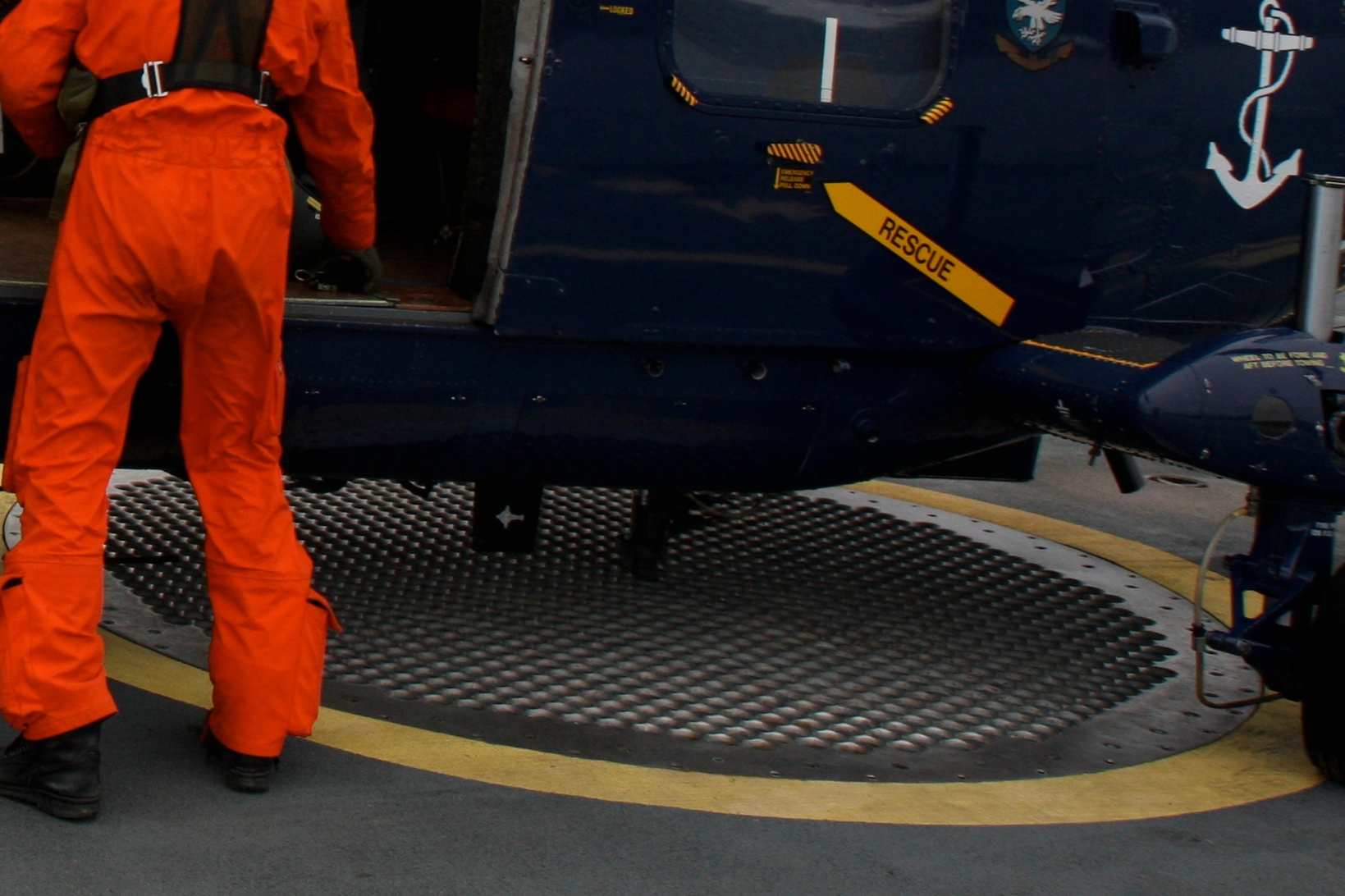
A Lynx using the Deck Lock

Deck lock is one of several systems for automatically securing rotorcraft on the Helicopter decks of small ships.

When the helicopter lands in such a way that the helicopter's harpoon is above the grid, the harpoon secures itself automatically to the grid through hydraulic actuators.

A deck lock system was in use by the Royal Navy with its Westland Lynx aircraft, and presently with its AgustaWestland AW159 Wildcat helicopters.
