= Westland Lynx =

Military helicopter family

WG.13 Lynx / Super Lynx
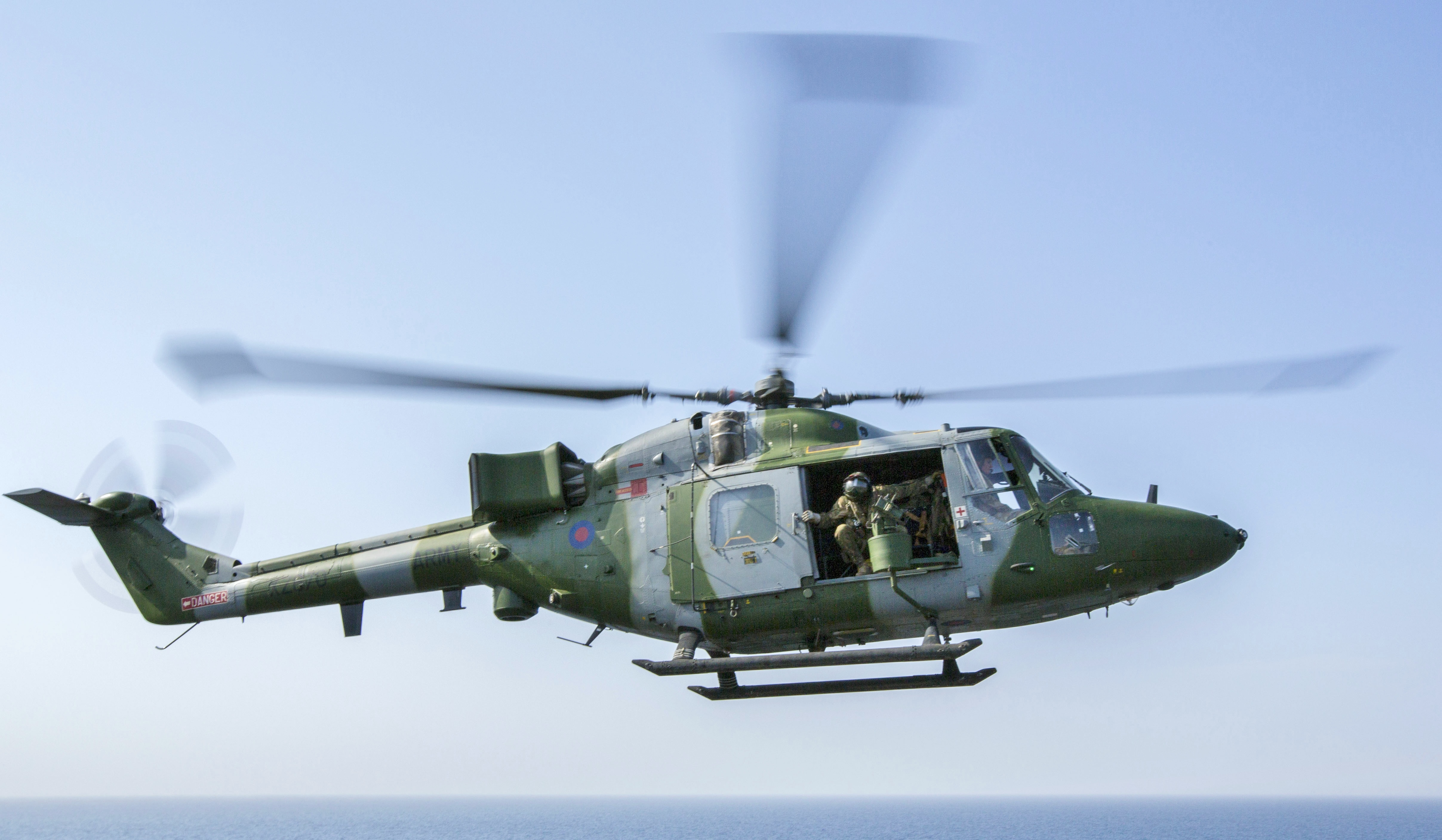
- A British Army Lynx in 2013

General information
- Type: Multi-purpose military helicopter
- National origin: United Kingdom
- Manufacturer: Westland Helicopters; AgustaWestland
- Status: In service
- Primary users: British Army (historical): Royal Navy (historical); German Navy; See Operators for others
- Number built: 450 (as of 2009)

History
- Introduction date: 1978
- First flight: 21 March 1971
- Retired: 2011 (Royal Danish Navy); 2012 (Royal Netherlands Navy); 2014 (Royal Norwegian Air Force); 2017 (Royal Navy); 2018 (British Army); 2020 (French Navy)
- Developed into: Westland 30; AgustaWestland AW159 Wildcat

The Westland Lynx is a British multi-purpose twin-engined military helicopter designed and built by Westland Helicopters at its factory in Yeovil. Originally intended as a utility craft for both civil and naval usage, military interest led to the development of both battlefield and naval variants. The Lynx went into operational usage in 1977 and was later adopted by the armed forces of over a dozen nations, primarily serving in the battlefield utility, anti-armour, search and rescue and anti-submarine warfare roles.

The Lynx is a fully aerobatic helicopter with the ability to perform loops and rolls. In 1986, a specially modified Lynx set the current Fédération Aéronautique Internationale's official airspeed record for helicopters (category excludes compound helicopters) at 400.87 km/h (249.09 mph), which remains unbroken as of January 2022.

Several land and naval variants of the Lynx have been produced along with some major derivatives. The Westland 30 was produced as a civil utility helicopter; it was not a commercial success and only a small number were built during the 1980s. In the 21st century, a modernised variant of the Lynx was designed as a multi-role combat helicopter, designated as the AgustaWestland AW159 Wildcat; the Wildcat is intended to replace existing Lynx helicopters.

== Development ==
=== Origins ===
The initial design, then known as the Westland WG.13, was started in the mid-1960s as a replacement for the Westland Scout and Wasp, and a more advanced alternative to the Bell UH-1 Iroquois. The design was to be powered by a pair of Bristol Siddeley BS.360 turboshaft engines. As part of the Anglo-French helicopter agreement signed in February 1967, French company Sud Aviation (later Aérospatiale) had a 30 per cent share of production work, Westland performing the remainder. It was intended that France would procure the Lynx for its navy and a heavily modified armed reconnaissance variant for the French Army, with the United Kingdom in return buying the Aérospatiale Gazelle and the Puma for its armed forces. In October 1969, the French Army cancelled its requirement for the Lynx, so development of the armed variant was terminated at an early stage.

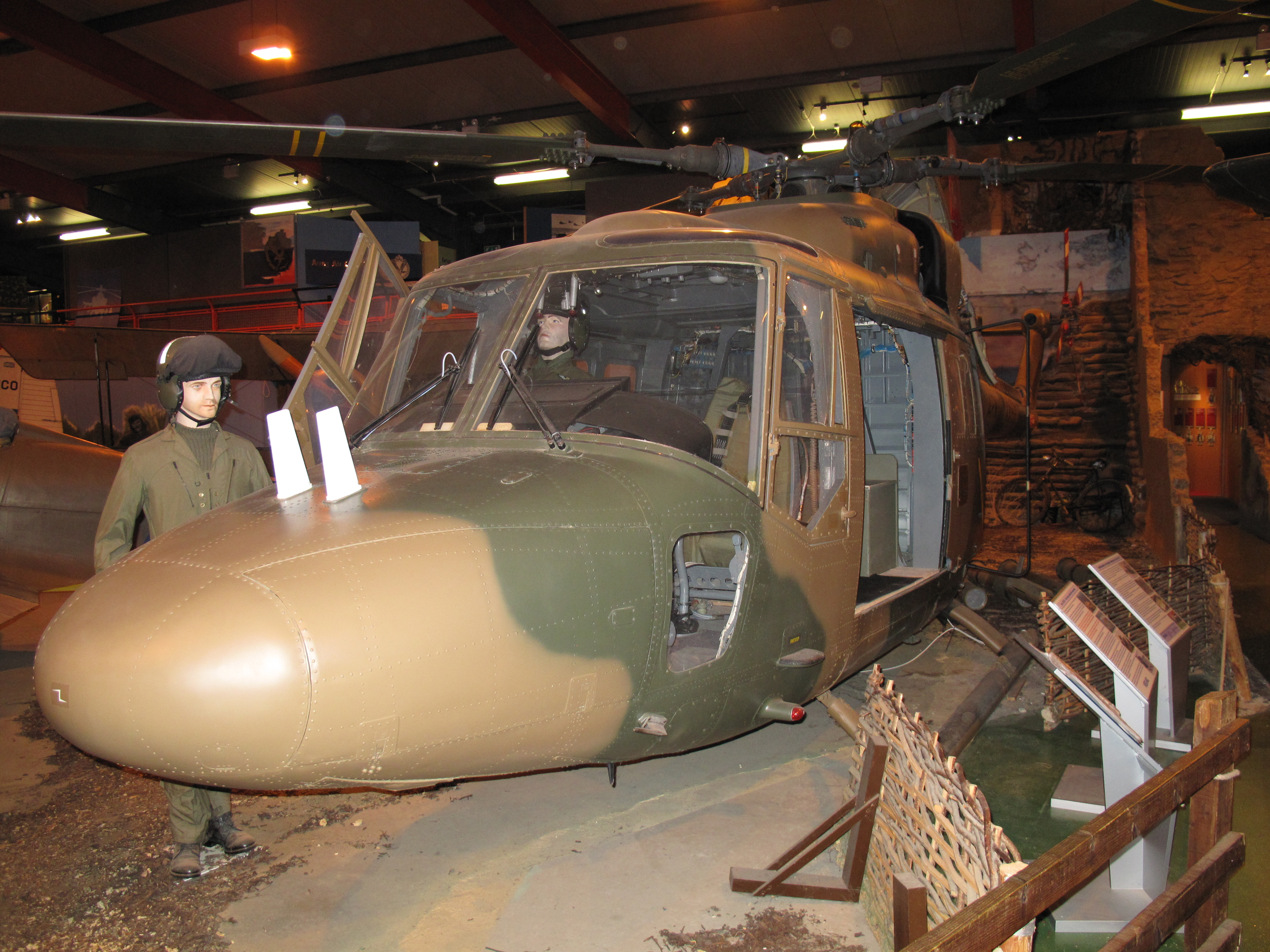
Lynx XX153, which broke the helicopter speed record in 1972, preserved on public display at the Museum of Army Flying

The first Lynx prototype took its maiden flight on 21 March 1971. In 1972, a Lynx broke the world speed record over 15 and 25 km by flying at 321.74 km/h (199.9 mph) and set a new 100 km closed circuit record shortly afterwards, flying at 318.504 km/h (197.9 mph); both of these records were set by L. Roy Moxam OBE, Westland's Deputy Chief Test Pilot (later Chief Test Pilot). In 1986, the former company demonstrator Lynx, registered G-LYNX, was specially modified with Gem 60 engines and British Experimental Rotor Programme (BERP) rotor blades. On 11 August 1986 the helicopter was piloted by Trevor Egginton when it set an absolute speed record for helicopters over a 15 and 25 km course by reaching 400.87 kilometres per hour (216.45 kn; 249.09 mph); an official record with the FAI it still holds. At this speed, its lift-to-drag ratio was 2, and its BERP blade tips reached a speed of Mach 0.97.

The British Army ordered over 100 Lynx helicopters under the designation of Lynx AH.1 (Army Helicopter Mark 1) to perform several roles, such as transport, armed escort, anti-tank warfare (with eight TOW missiles), reconnaissance and evacuation missions. Deliveries of production helicopters began in 1977. An improved Lynx AH.1 with Gem 41-1 or Gem 42 engines and an uprated transmission was referred to as the Lynx AH.5; only five were built for evaluation. The AH.5 led to the Lynx AH.7, which added a new tail rotor derived from the Westland 30, a reinforced airframe, improved avionics and defensive aids.

The initial naval variant of the Lynx, known as the Lynx HAS.2 in British service, or Lynx Mk.2(FN) in French service, differed from the Lynx AH.1 in being equipped with a tricycle undercarriage and a deck restraint system, folding main rotor blades, an emergency flotation system and a nose-mounted radar. An improved Lynx for the Royal Navy, the Lynx HAS.3, had Gem 42-1 Mark 204 engines, an uprated transmission, a new flotation system and an Orange Crop ESM system. The Lynx HAS.3 also received various other updates in service. A similar upgrade to the French Lynx was known as the Lynx Mk.4(FN).

=== Licensed manufacturing, Super Lynx, and Battlefield Lynx ===
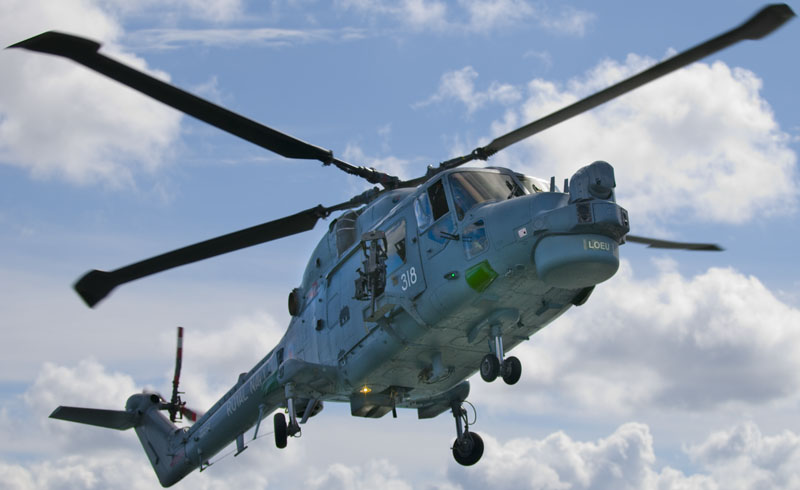
A Royal Navy Lynx HMA.8 of the Lynx Operational Evaluation Unit

In September 1974, the British and Egyptian governments initiated talks to establish a new Egyptian helicopter manufacturer. Out of these talks, the Arab British Helicopter Company (ABHCO) was established during the 1970s; this new organisation was accompanied by an initial arrangement to manufacture under licence the Lynx AH.1 in Helwan, Egypt. A separate agreement was formalised with Rolls-Royce to license manufacture the Lynx's Gem engines at the Helwan facility. However, this plan was ultimately aborted due to a lack of funds that resulted from the collapse of the Arab Organization for Industrialization (AOI).

South Korean Navy Mk.99A Super Lynx helicopter on the flight deck of USS Lassen (DDG 82)

Announced in 1984, the Lynx-3 was an enhanced development, featuring a stretched fuselage, a redesigned tail boom, Gem 60-3/1 engines, a wheeled tricycle undercarriage, BERP rotor blades, and increased fuel capacity. Both Army and Naval variants were proposed; however, the project was ended in 1987 due to insufficient orders being placed. Only one Army Lynx-3 prototype was built. A development of the Lynx AH.7 with the wheeled undercarriage of the Lynx-3 was marketed by Westland as the Battlefield Lynx in the late 1980s. The prototype first flew in November 1989, and deliveries began in 1991. In British Army service this variant is designated as the Lynx AH.9.

In the early 1990s, Westland incorporated some of the technology from the Naval Lynx-3 design into a less-radical Super Lynx. This featured BERP rotor blades, the Westland 30-derived tail rotor, Gem 42 engines, a new under-nose 360-degree radar installation and an optional nose-mounted electro-optical sensor turret. Royal Navy Lynx HAS.3s upgraded to Super Lynx standard were known in service as the Lynx HMA.8, and several export customers ordered new-build or upgraded Super Lynxes. From the 1990s onwards, Westland began offering the Super Lynx 200, which was equipped with LHTEC CTS800 engines, and the Super Lynx 300, which also had a new cockpit and avionics derived from the AgustaWestland EH101. Both of these models have achieved several export sales. In 2002, Flight International reported that more than 40 variants of the Lynx were in service with different users, almost 400 aircraft having been built for various customers.

=== Future Lynx/Lynx Wildcat ===
The British Army and Royal Navy Lynx fleets were to be replaced to a new common advanced Lynx variant based on the Super Lynx 300, with a new tail boom, undercarriage, cockpit, avionics and sensors. Initially referred to as the Future Lynx, and later as the Lynx Wildcat, this type has since been re-designated as the AW159 Wildcat.

While having the Lynx as the origins and basis of its design, the Wildcat differs substantially. Only 5% of its components, including some main rotor gearbox parts and fuel system, remain interchangeable with previous Lynx variants.

== Design ==
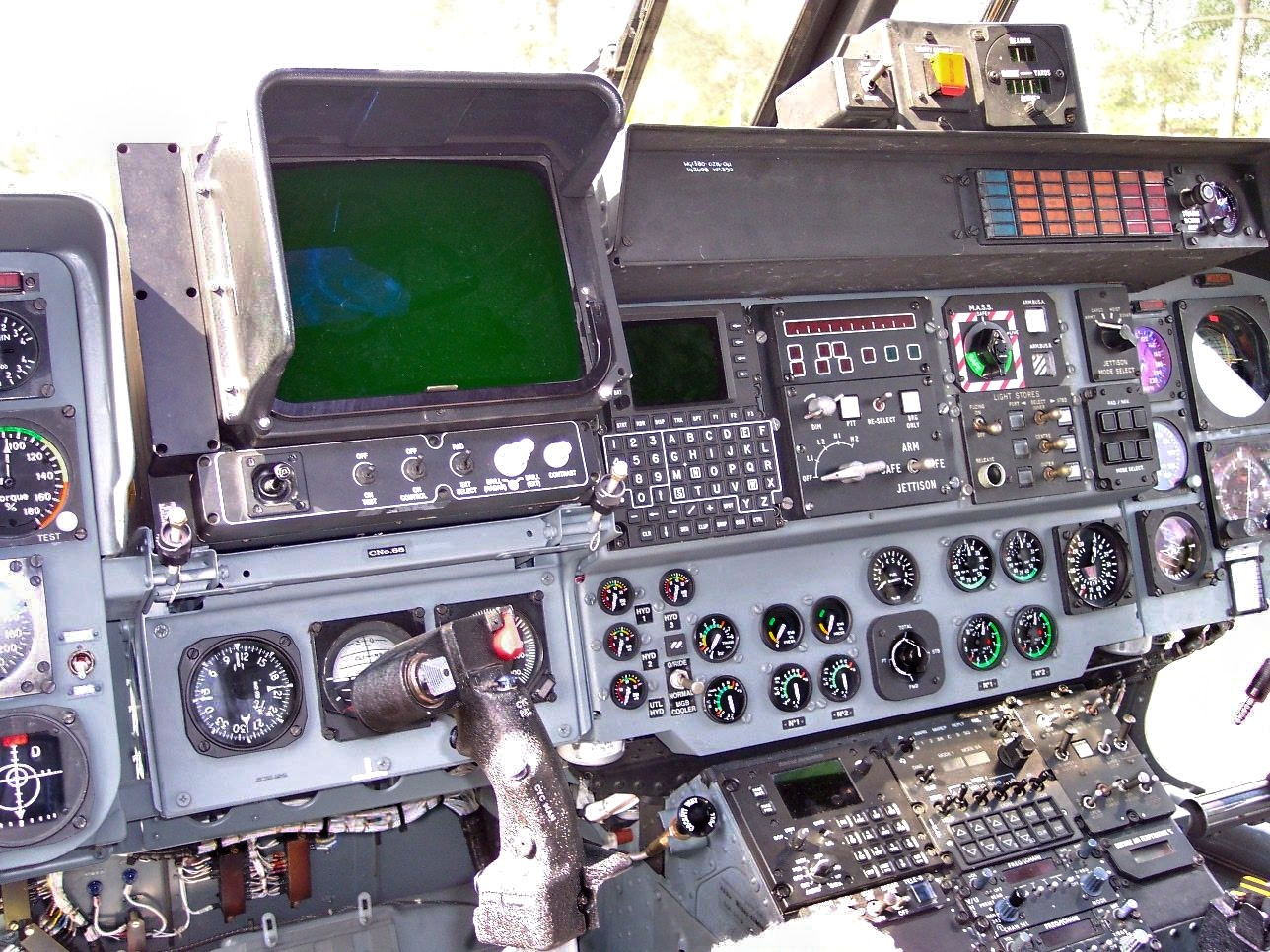
Cockpit of a German Navy Lynx

The Lynx is a multi-purpose twin-engine battlefield helicopter, of which specialised versions have been developed for both sea and land-based warfare. A distinguishing feature between early and later aircraft is the undercarriage: early Army versions of the Lynx were equipped with skids, while the Naval and later models have been outfitted with wheels, a requirement for easy ground handling on the deck of a warship. Early versions of the Lynx were powered by a pair of Rolls-Royce Gem turboshaft engines and had a four-blade rotor, mounted on a rigid titanium monobloc rotor head of the kind pioneered by the MBB BO105 a few years earlier. The innovative blade design comprised a honeycomb sandwich structure made out of composite material. For shipboard stowage, both the rotor blades and tail can be folded. Lag dampers were incorporated but these are not required in flight (owing to the rigidity of the monobloc rotor head). The main rotor features a vibration absorption system.

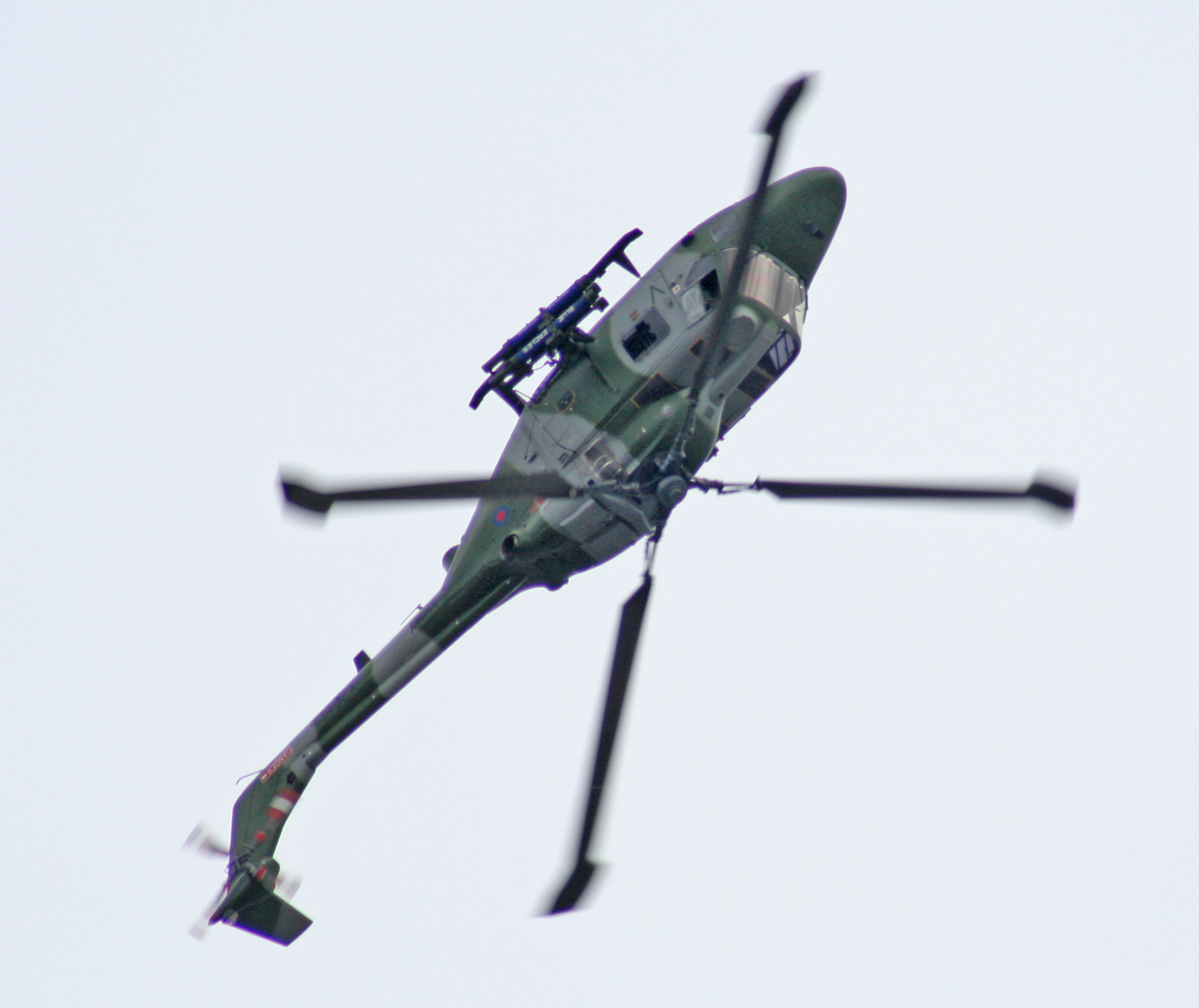
Lynx near the top of a loop

The Lynx is an agile helicopter, capable of performing loops and rolls, and of attaining high speeds. The agility of the type led to its use as an aerial display aircraft, having been operated by the Blue Eagles and Black Cats helicopter display teams. The efficiency of the main rotor, as well as the overall top speed of the Lynx, was substantially improved with the adoption of BERP rotor blade technology. (Note: Aerodynamicists at Westland calculated that a Lynx equipped with BERP rotor blades generate approximately 35% more thrust before encountering blade stall than conventional counterparts; the validity of this finding has been called into question however.) During the 1990s, the hot-and-high performance of the type was considerably boosted in the later Super Lynx 200 series, at which point the type's Gem engines were replaced with the newer LHTEC T800 turboshaft engine with associated FADEC system; the Lynx can also maintain a good level of performance under moderate icing conditions. The FADEC controls eliminated the requirement for a throttle or manual speed selection switches, further simplifying flight control. Later aircraft feature automatic stabilisation equipment; functions such as auto-hover are installed on some Lynx.

Various avionics and on-board systems are integrated on the Lynx in order to perform differing mission profiles. Several operators have equipped their Lynx with BAE Systems' Seaspray surveillance radar to provide for a surface search capability, which is used in maritime patrol, search and rescue, and other mission profiles. British Army models are equipped with a Marconi Elliot automatic flight control system capable of performing automatic three axes stabilisation. The integration of both avionics and weapons systems is customised for each Lynx batch to customer specifications and requirements. Most of the installed sensors and avionics are typically integrated with the aircraft's avionics management system (AMS), from where they can be managed by either pilot; sensors such the optional nose-mounted FLIR can be set up to directly cue the weapon systems. Functions such as navigation and communications are also tied into the AMS, with information from these systems displayed to the pilots on interchangeable integrated display units in the cockpit. The Lynx is considerably easier to service and maintain than the AgustaWestland Apache. (Note: According to Flight International, the anti-tank capabilities of the Lynx compare favorably to the Apache attack helicopter.)

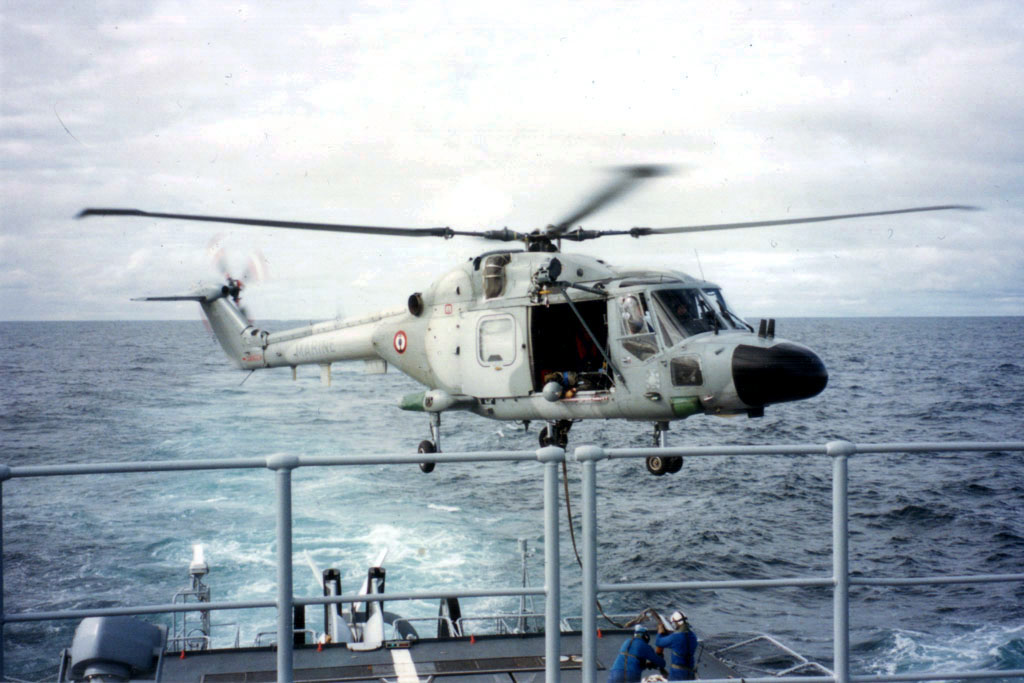
Aéronavale Lynx hovering above the deck of Latouche-Tréville

The Lynx features a two-man cockpit for a pilot and observer sitting side by side; the British Army typically operates their fleet with a three-man crew, a door gunner being the third member. The cabin, located behind the cockpit, is accessed through a pair of large sliding doors on each side of the fuselage; it can accommodate up to ten equipped troops, depending upon seating configuration. An alternative configuration houses radio equipment in the cabin area when the aircraft is being used in the airborne command post role; the cabin can also be used to house additional fuel tanks for conducting long distance missions and ferry trips. The Lynx can perform a wide variety of mission types, including anti-submarine and anti-surface warfare, vessel replenishment, search and rescue, airborne reconnaissance, armed attack, casualty evacuation and troop transport; according to AgustaWestland, a Lynx can be converted from one mission-type to another within the space of 40 minutes.

Typical combat equipment includes stabilised roof-mounted sensors, onboard countermeasures and door guns; when being used in the anti-tank role, the Lynx is typically armed with BGM-71 TOW missiles; missiles such as the Sea Skua have been used in the maritime anti-surface role. Additional armaments that have been interchangeably used include rockets, 20 mm cannons, torpedoes, and depth charges. Those Lynx built for export have been typically outfitted with armaments and equipment customised for the end-user, such as the Mokopa air-to-surface missile used on Algeria's Lynx fleet, eight of which can be carried; studies into equipping the AGM-114 Hellfire have been performed, and air-to-air missiles could also reportedly be adopted if the capability is sought by operators. Equipped armaments can be managed and controlled inflight through the onboard stores management system. In order to counteract battlefield threats such as infrared-guided missiles, various defensive aid subsystems can be optionally installed, including warning receivers and countermeasures.

Many of the Lynx's components had been derived from earlier Westland helicopters such as the Scout and Wasp. The Lynx has been substantially upgraded since entering service in the 1970s; improvements made to in-service aircraft have typically included strengthened airframes, new avionics and engines, improved rotor blades, and additional surveillance and communications systems. Various subsystems from overseas suppliers have been incorporated into some Lynx variants; during a South Korean procurement, hulls produced in the United Kingdom were equipped with Korean-built systems, such as ISTAR, electro-optical, electronic warfare, fire-control systems, flight control actuators, and undercarriages. A glass cockpit was adopted on the Super Lynx 300, featuring fully integrated flight and mission display systems, a variety of integrated display units including head-up displays, and dual controls; AgustaWestland has commented that the new cockpit reduces aircrew workload and increases aircraft effectiveness. The head-up display installed could be replaced by a helmet-mounted sight system on customer demand.

== Operational history ==
=== United Kingdom ===
The Lynx AH.1 entered service with the British Army's Army Air Corps (AAC) in 1979, followed by the Lynx HAS.2 with the Fleet Air Arm (FAA) in 1981. The FAA fleet was upgraded to Lynx HAS.3 standard during the 1980s, and again to HMA.8 standard in the 1990s. Most Army aircraft were upgraded to Lynx AH.7 and the later AH.9/AH.9A standards as utility helicopters; they have also served with 3 Commando Brigade Air Squadron (3 CBAS) of the Royal Marines and later, the Commando Helicopter Force (CHF) of the FAA, operating as reconnaissance and attack/utility helicopters to support the Royal Marines. During the Cold War, it was envisioned that Army Lynxes would be paired with Westland Gazelle helicopters to counter Soviet armoured vehicles. Lynx HAS.3 and HMA.8 variants operate as anti-submarine warfare and maritime attack helicopters armed with Sting Ray torpedoes, Sea Skua anti-ship missiles and depth charges, from Royal Navy warships. Navy Lynx have been critical to maritime patrol operations, including non-military operations such as counter-narcotics missions.

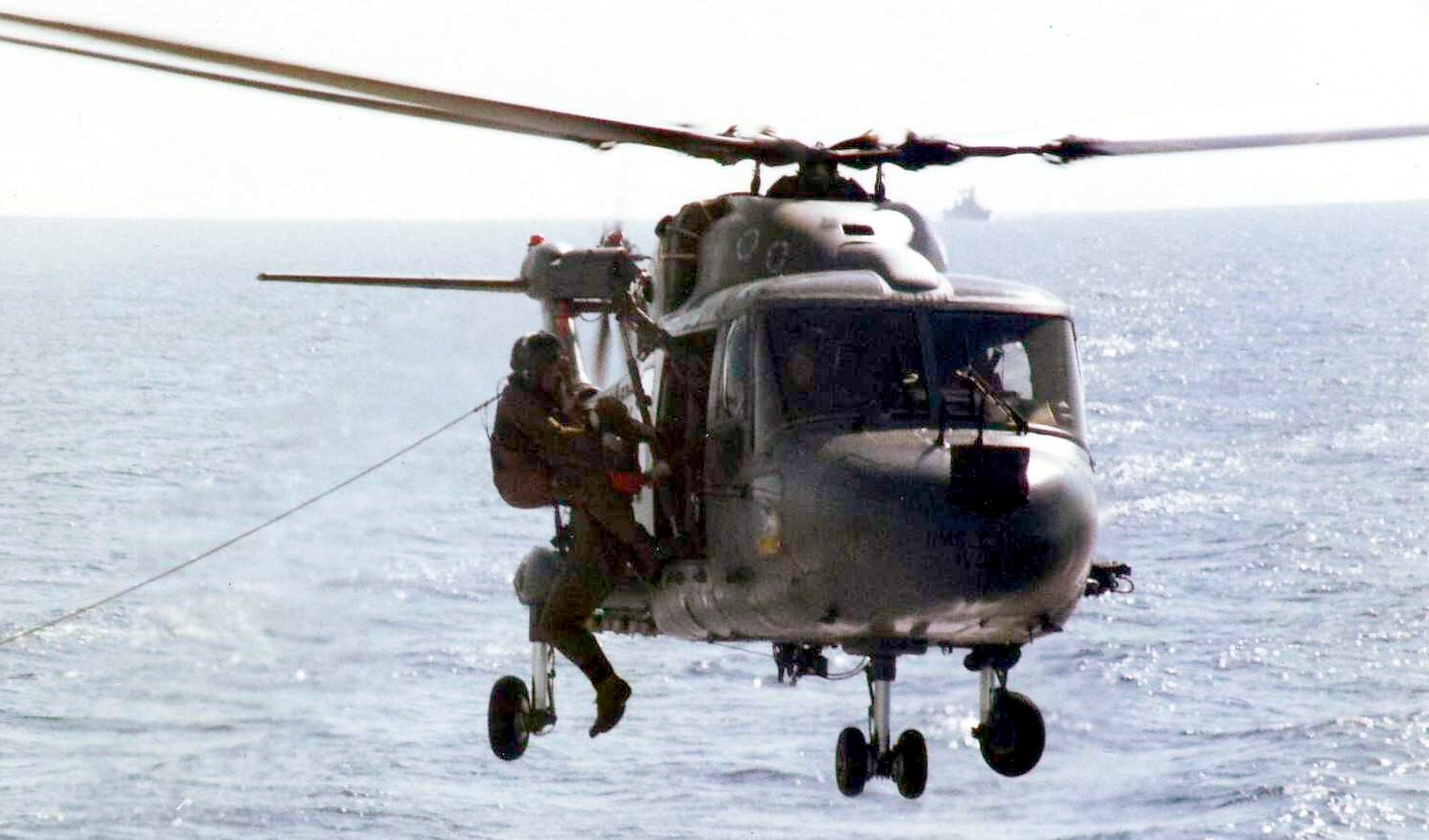
A Lynx HAS.3 of HMS Cardiff in March 1982 prior to the Falklands War practising search and rescue

The Lynx HAS.2 ASW variant participated in combat operations during the Falklands War in 1982. A combination of Lynx and Westland Sea King helicopters were used to maintain continuous anti-submarine patrols in order to protect the British task force offshore from the Falkland Islands. On 3 May, a Lynx conducted the first combat-firing of a Sea Skua missile, firing on the Argentinian patrol boat ARA Alférez Sobral, inflicting considerable damage to the vessel. This was the first use of sea-skimming missiles in the conflict. Although none were shot down in combat, a total of three were lost aboard vessels that were struck by attacks from Argentine aircraft, these vessels being HMS Coventry, HMS Ardent and SS Atlantic Conveyor.

On 14 May 1989, in the type's second fatal accident, Lynx HAS3GM XZ244, attached to HMS Brilliant, crashed near Mombasa, Kenya, while en route to the city's airport for a period of shore leave. A door had detached when opened inflight and collided with the tail rotor, resulting in the aircraft splitting in half and the death of all nine personnel on board. As a result, door modifications and inflight opening restrictions were introduced. As of 2004, it remained the deadliest Lynx crash.

The Navy's Lynx helicopters were among Britain's contribution to the coalition against Saddam Hussein's Iraq during the 1991 Gulf War. During the Battle of Bubiyan, the biggest naval engagement of the conflict, the Lynx and its Sea Skua missiles proved to be decisive, being responsible for the majority of individual engagements with various Iraqi Navy vessels. By 2 February 1991, 25 Sea Skuas had been launched, out of these, 18 were confirmed as having hit their targets, and had succeeding in heavily damaging a significant portion of Iraq's navy. Navy Lynxes were routinely used to deploy troops to oil platforms and into occupied Kuwait, as well as to perform aerial reconnaissance across the Gulf.

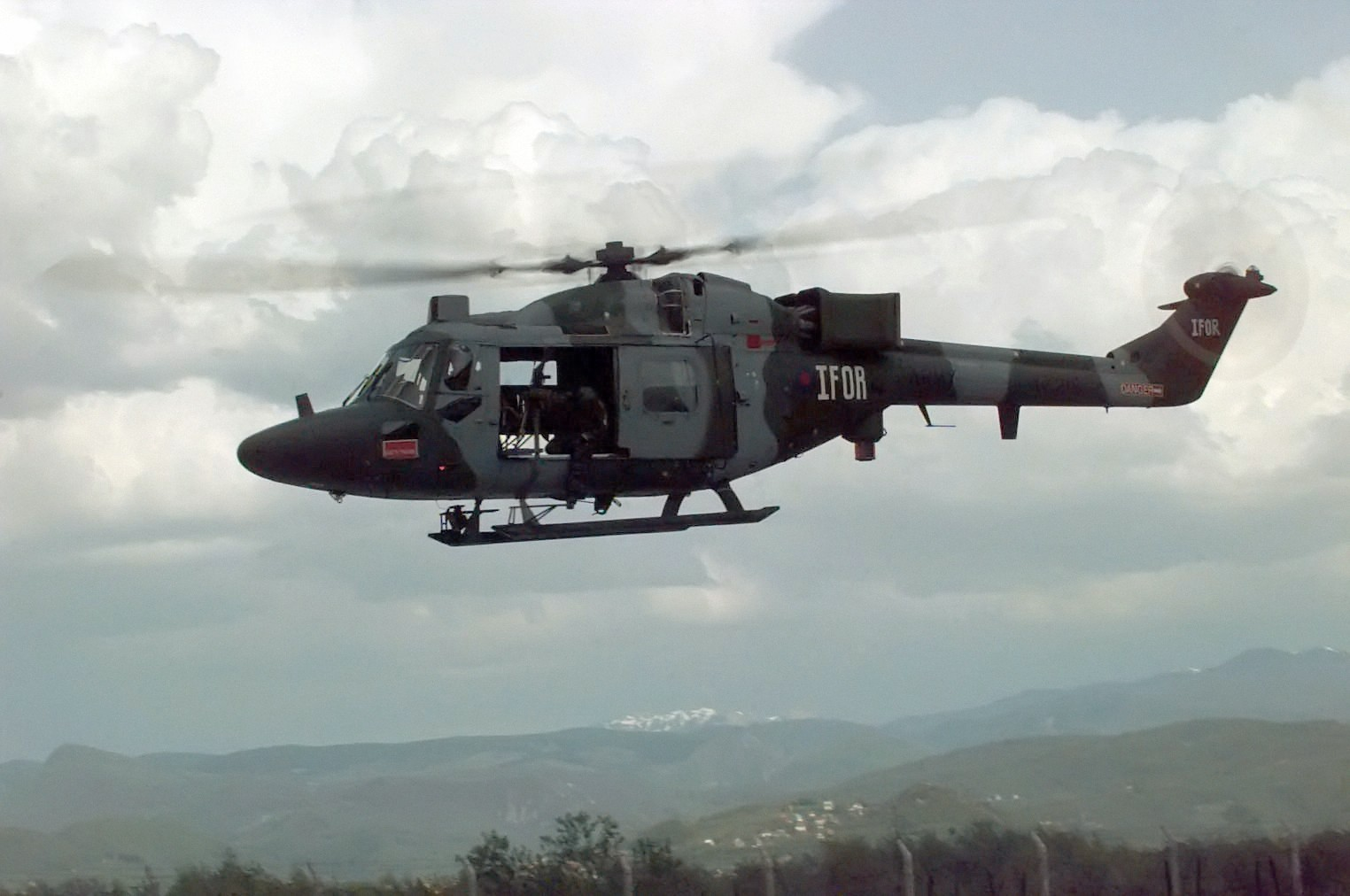
A British Army Lynx AH.7 in Bosnia during Operation Resolute, in 1996

The British Army also deployed 24 TOW-armed Lynxes alongside an equal number of Westland Gazelle helicopters during the Gulf War. They were assigned the mission of locating and attacking Iraqi tank concentrations, and to support the advance of coalition ground forces into Kuwait and Southern Iraq during the 100 hours war phase of the conflict. On 26 February 1991, a Lynx of 654 Squadron AAC destroyed two MTLB armoured personnel carriers (APCs) and four T-55 tanks using TOW missiles: the engagement was the first recorded combat use of TOW from a British helicopter.

On 19 March 1994, during The Troubles in Northern Ireland, the Irish Republican Army (IRA) brought down Lynx AH.7 ZD275 of the AAC with an improvised mortar, striking it while attempting to land at Crossmaglen Army base. The pilot managed to crash land and the aircraft was destroyed, but all crew on board survived. Author Toby Harnden described the incident as the IRA's most successful operation against a helicopter.

British army helicopter crashed near Gornji Vakuf, Bosnia on 22 December 1998. Two servicemen were killed and a third crew member was critically wounded.

Various British Lynxes were used during the NATO intervention in the conflict between Serbia and Kosovo, later known as the Kosovo War. They were frequently employed to supply NATO forces inside the theatre, including those engaged in humanitarian operations. In June 1999, the type was employed to escort British ground forces being air-deployed into Kosovo via Chinooks, during NATO's first phase of deployment. For a number of years, British Army Lynx and Gazelle helicopters were deployed within Kosovo, performing reconnaissance and transport duties in support of NATO peacekeeping forces.

In September 2000, Army Lynxes were used in Sierra Leone to rescue several British soldiers during Operation Barras. In 2002, a Lynx attached to HMS Richmond crashed 200 miles off the coast of Virginia.

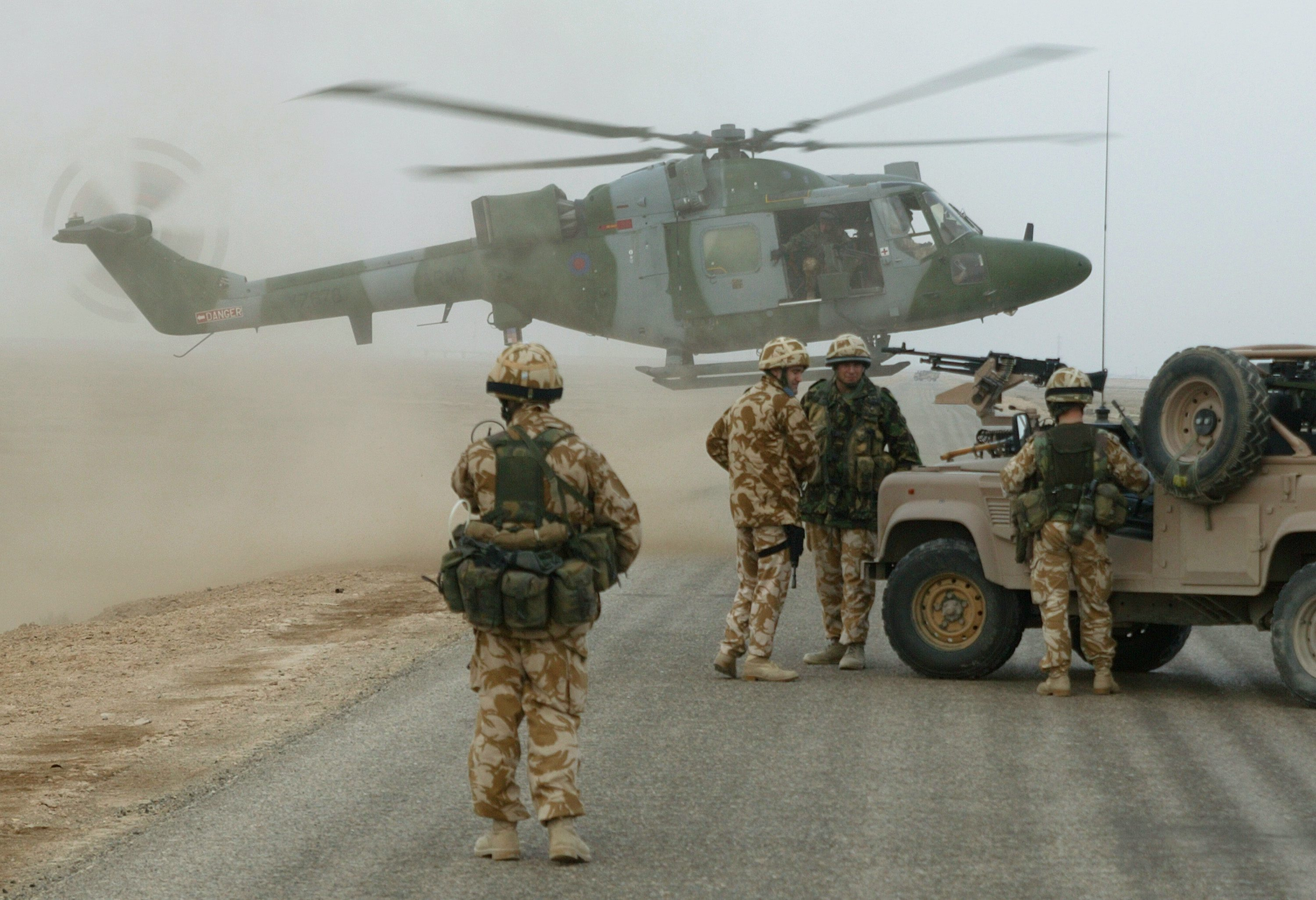
A Westland Lynx of the Army Air Corps landing on a desert road south of Basra Airport, 2003

In March 2003, the Lynx formed the bulk of the deployed British rotary aviation battle group in the invasion of Iraq. Participating aircraft were quickly outfitted with engine sand filters, armour, heat dissipaters, modern secure radios and radar warning receivers. In the subsequent multi-national occupation force, a flight of either AAC or CHF Lynx AH.7s were based at Basra International Airport under command of the Joint Helicopter Force (Iraq) on a rotational basis. In theatre, they would escort infantry patrols, perform aerial reconnaissance, provide fire support and act as airborne communications hubs. Problems in operating in the high temperature environment were encountered, with the helicopters often operating with no power reserve and thus without the ability to overshoot during landings; these problems were belatedly overcome by the introduction of the Lynx AH.9A.

On 6 May 2006, Lynx AH.7 XZ6140 of the CHF, was shot down by a man-portable surface-to-air missile over Basra, southern Iraq; the first British helicopter and only the second British aircraft downed (the first was an RAF Hercules) by enemy fire in the war. Among the five killed were 847 Naval Air Squadron's commanding officer, Lieutenant Commander Darren Chapman; Wing Commander Coxen, who had been due to take command of the region's British helicopter forces, and Flight Lieutenant Sarah-Jayne Mulvihill; Coxen was the most senior British officer to die in the conflict and Mulvihill was the first British servicewoman to die in action in 22 years. At the crash scene, British troops reportedly encountered rioting Iraqi civilians and were fired on by militia, while civilians were killed in the ensuing clashes. The crash led to a review of the vulnerability of helicopter transports in southern Iraq.

In 2006, the first Lynx AH.7 was deployed to Helmand Province, Afghanistan; this variant would only be subsequently used during winter months due to the performance limitations imposed during the high summer temperatures. The Lynx AH.9A later deployed was praised as having been a substantial performance improvement. On 26 April 2014, Lynx AH.9A ZF540 of the Army Air Corps crashed near Kandahar Airfield in Afghanistan, killing the three crew and two passengers on board. This was the first fatal accident in the conflict involving a British military helicopter and the third largest loss of life of British troops in a single incident in Afghanistan since 2001.

The Royal Navy retired its Lynx helicopters from active service on 23 March 2017 with its official decommissioning. On 17 March, a final flypast was conducted by four Royal Navy Westland Lynx HMA8 helicopters from 815 Naval Air Squadron, based at RNAS Yeovilton in Somerset. The Army Air Corps retired the Lynx in 2018, with the disbandment of 657 Squadron AAC.

=== Others ===
==== Germany ====
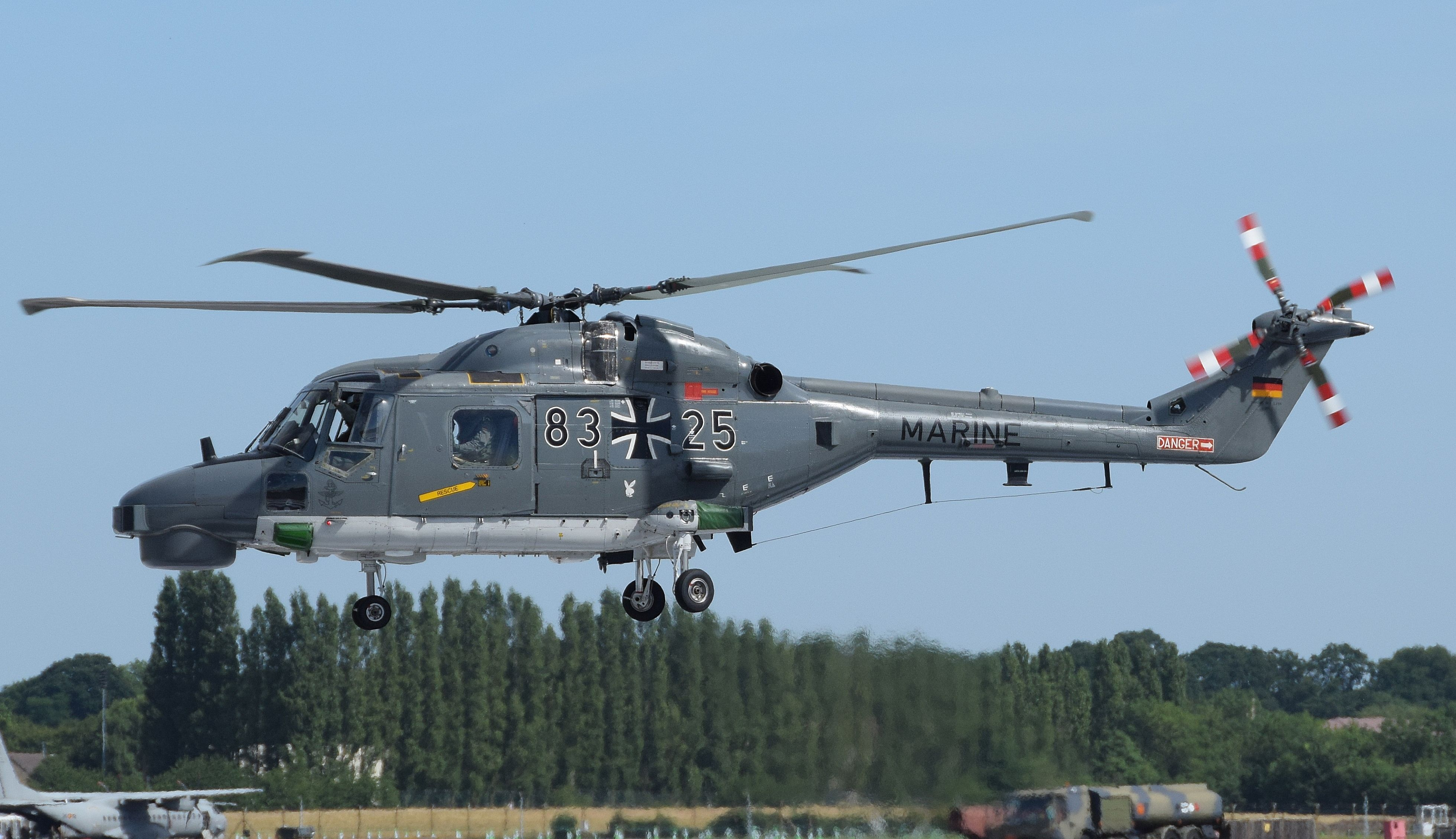
Westland Super Lynx Mk88a of the German Navy in 2017

The first German Navy Lynx, a Sea Lynx Mk88 model, was manufactured in 1981. A total of 19 were built. In 1996, the German Navy elected to purchase seven additional Super Lynx Mk88As; in 1998, the decision was taken to upgrade the existing Mk88 fleet, by then numbering a total of 17, to the improved Mk88A standard. In the anti-surface role, Germany's Lynx fleet were supplemented by several Westland Sea Kings, which were upgraded with Sea Skua missiles in the 1990s. In 2009, Germany was studying a limited upgrade programme for their Super Lynx fleet which reportedly included the replacement of the current anti-ship missile. In 2013, the German defence ministry signed a contract with Selex ES to integrate new electro-optical/infrared sensors onto the Super Lynx.

Since 2012, German Lynx have been deployed routinely off the coast of Somalia to discourage and intervene against acts of piracy as a part of the multinational Operation Atalanta. In September 2014, 15 of the navy's 22-strong Sea Lynx Mk88A fleet were temporarily grounded following the discovery of fuselage cracks on some aircraft. The German Defense Ministry estimated that the Sea Lynx fleet would return to full strength in early 2015. The German Navy is to retire all its Super Lynx until the end of 2026 in favour of the NH90 Sea Tiger.

==== South Korea ====
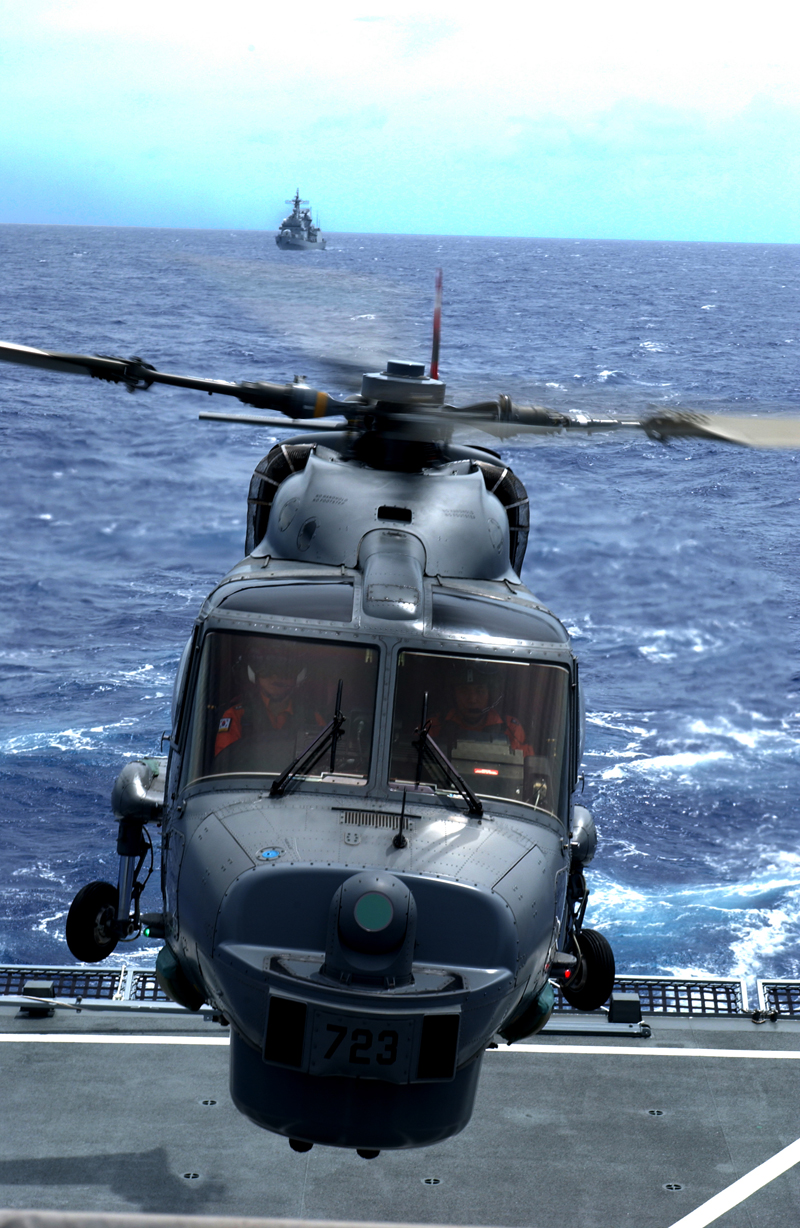
ROK Navy Lynx

The Republic of Korea Navy (ROKN) of South Korea took delivery of the first batch of 12 Mk.99 Lynx helicopters in 1990; a second batch of 13 Mk.99A Super Lynx helicopters began delivery in 1999. The first Lynx batch was later upgraded to the same standard as the second batch; the changes included the adoption of a new radar, FLIR, and ESM systems. In 2013, South Korea's Defense Acquisition Program Administration announced its selection of the AW159 Wildcat; deliveries of eight aircraft are planned for 2015–16; these will be used for search and rescue, anti-submarine warfare and surveillance missions.

In May 2009, a ROKN Lynx successfully protected a North Korean freighter from being pursued by pirates off the coast of Somalia. In 2010, South Korea's Lynx fleet was temporarily grounded for emergency inspections following the crashes of two aircraft within the same week. Shortly afterwards it was discovered that the ROKN's helicopters had been victim of a maintenance scam, involving falsified documentation and faked replacement of components; by 2011, 12 employees of two South Korean private companies had been jailed, two ROKN officers were indicted, and several other officers were to be remanded as a result.

In 2024, South Korea approved an almost 2.9 trillion won (₩) program to replace the Lynx helicopters by the 2030s.

==== France ====
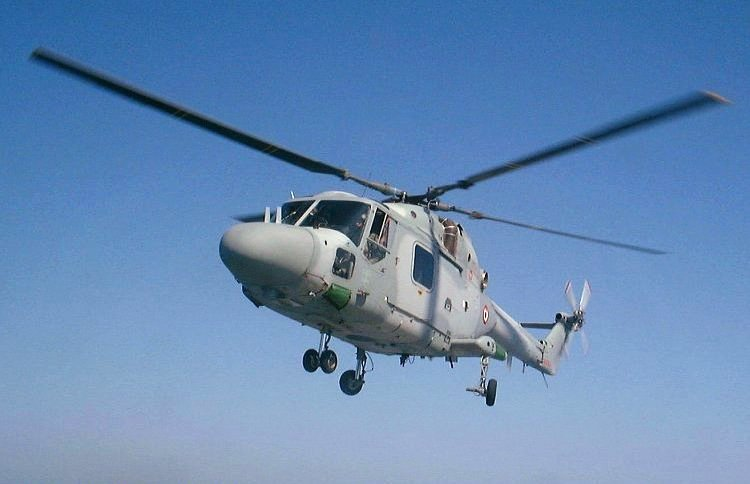
French Navy Lynx approaching at a low altitude, 2000

In 1979, the Lynx Mk.2(FN) entered service with the French Naval Aviation of the French Navy, a total of 26 aircraft would be procured, followed by 14 improved Mk.4(FN)s. Upon entering service, the French Lynx was more capable of performing independent anti-submarine operations than its Royal Navy counterpart, a single aircraft being capable of simultaneously being equipped for detection and weapon delivery roles. In February 2011, a French Lynx landed on the flight deck of a FREMM multipurpose frigate for the first time as a part of qualifying trials. In addition to France's own Lynx fleet, French Navy vessels have also hosted British Lynx helicopters, such as during an extended counter-piracy deployment on board the La Fayette-class frigate Surcouf during 2012. In 2019, the French Navy announced plans to retire the Lynx by 2020, and the type carried out its final operational deployment, aboard the frigate Latouche-Tréville, in July 2020. It was formally retired from French service on 4 September 2020.

==== The Netherlands ====
The Royal Netherlands Navy's (RNN) Naval Aviation Service operated fleet of 24 Lynx for a total of 36 years, entering service in 1976 and phased out in 2012 after being extensively used. These performed search and rescue, anti-submarine warfare, anti-surface warfare and special forces support tasks while operating from the flight decks of most RNN vessels during this period. In 1993, the RNN fleet were upgraded to a common Lynx SH-14D standard. In 1999, a design defect in the rotor-head used on some Lynx aircraft was responsible for the loss of a Dutch aircraft in 1999; this led to a number of Lynx worldwide to be temporarily grounded until retrofitted with new titanium rotor-heads. On 28 February 2011, a Dutch Lynx and three navy personnel were captured by Libyan forces while performing an evacuation mission inside the country. On 19 September 2012, the RNN performed its final operational Lynx flight. The Lynx was replaced by the NH90.

==== Portugal ====
The Portuguese Naval Aviation of the Portuguese Navy exclusively operates the Super Lynx Mk.95. In 1990, Portugal signed a contract for a total of five Super Lynx, two of them being refurbished ex-Royal Navy aircraft. A total of two Lynx can be operated from the flight deck of a single Vasco da Gama-class frigate; they typically accompany the vessels, including during long distance deployments for anti-piracy operations off the Horn of Africa.

==== Brazil ====
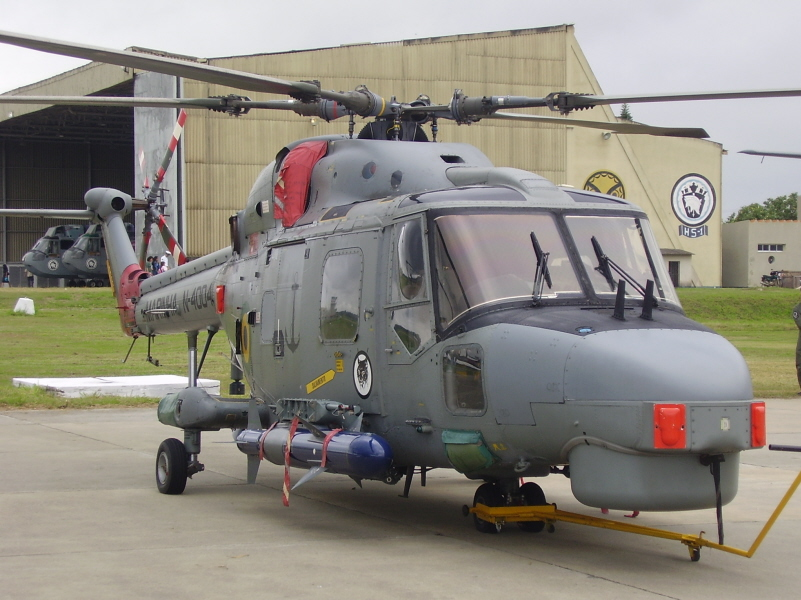
Super Lynx Mk.21A of the Brazilian Navy on static display, 2005

In 1978, the Brazilian Navy became the first foreign operator of the Lynx helicopter, having taken delivery of its first of a batch of five that year. During the 1990s, the fleet was more than doubled by the acquisition of a further batch of nine. During overseas deployments for multinational training exercises and United Nations operations, the Lynx has been described as "eyes and the ears of the fleet". In 2009, Brazil deployed several Lynx in an effort to locate the missing Air France Flight 447. In 2014, a mid-life upgrade process was agreed for Brazil's Lynx fleet, they shall receive LHTEC CTS800-4N engines, new avionics, satellite navigation systems, countermeasures, and night vision-compatible cockpit displays.

==== Norway ====
The Royal Norwegian Air Force (RNoAF) received its six Lynx Mk 86 in 1981. 337 Squadron was reactivated at Bardufoss and declared operational with Lynx in 1983. RNoAF operates the aircraft with the Norwegian Coast Guard's Nordkapp-class offshore patrol vessels. In 2010, one Lynx reached the end of its operational life and was withdrawn from service; a second aircraft suffered a non-fatal crash in 1988 and was totally rebuilt by Westland. The Lynx was to have been progressively replaced by the NH90 from 2005 onwards; however, deliveries of the new type suffered multiple delays, leading to Norway considering life extension measures on some of their Lynx fleet. Lynx was decommissioned in December 2014.

==== Denmark ====
The Royal Danish Navy (RDN) took delivery of eight Lynx Mk 80 between 1980 and 1981. A further two Mk 90 were delivered in 1987 and 1988 as attrition replacements. Operated by the Danish Naval Air Squadron, the RDN fleet is typically stationed upon naval inspection vessels and used to patrol Greenland and Faroe Islands as well as the Danish mainland. Beginning in 2000, the whole Lynx fleet was upgraded to Mk 90B standard. On 7 November 2006, a Danish Lynx had the distinction of performing the first helicopter landing on board a Visby-class corvette of the Swedish Navy. In January 2011, control of the Lynx fleet was transferred from the Danish Navy to the Royal Danish Air Force.

== Variants ==
=== Land-based variants ===
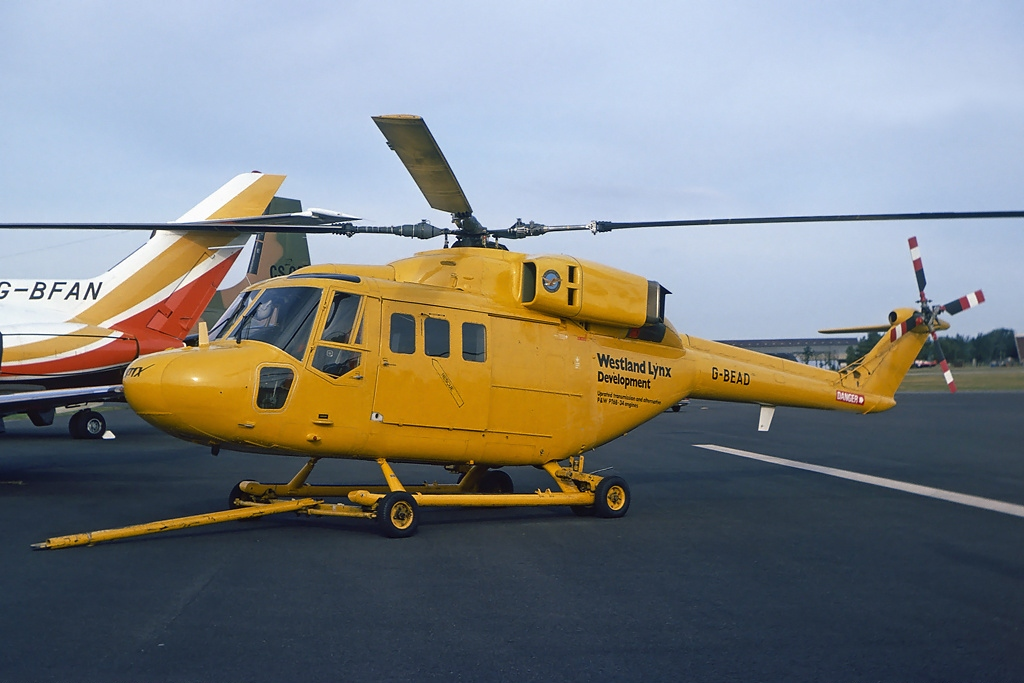
Prototype Lynx, which had its first flight on the 21st of March 1971 and later used as demonstrator. Shown here re-engined with a P&W PT-6B instead of the original Rolls-Royce Gem

Westland WG.13
Prototype, first flight 21 March 1971. Thirteen prototypes built.
Lynx AH.1
Initial production version for the British Army Air Corps, powered by 671 kW (900 hp) Gem 2 engines, with first production example flying 11 February 1977, and deliveries continuing until February 1984, with 113 built. Used for a variety of tasks, including tactical transport, armed escort, anti-tank warfare (60 were equipped with eight TOW missiles as Lynx AH.1 (TOW) from 1981), reconnaissance and casualty evacuation.
Lynx AH.1GT
Interim conversion of the AH.1 to partial AH.7 standard for the Army Air Corps with uprated engines and revised tail rotor.
Lynx HT.1
Planned training version for Royal Air Force to replace the Westland Whirlwind, cancelled.
Lynx AH.5
Upgraded version for the Army Air Corps, with 835 kW (1,120 shp) Gem 41-1 engines and uprated gearbox. Three built as AH.5 (Interim) as trials aircraft for MoD. Eight ordered as AH.5s for the Army Air Corps, of which only two were built as AH.5s, the remaining six were completed as AH.7s. Four were later upgraded to AH.7 standard and one was retained for trials work as an AH.5X.
Lynx AH.6
Proposed version for the Royal Marines with undercarriage, folding tail and deck lock of Naval Lynx. Not built.

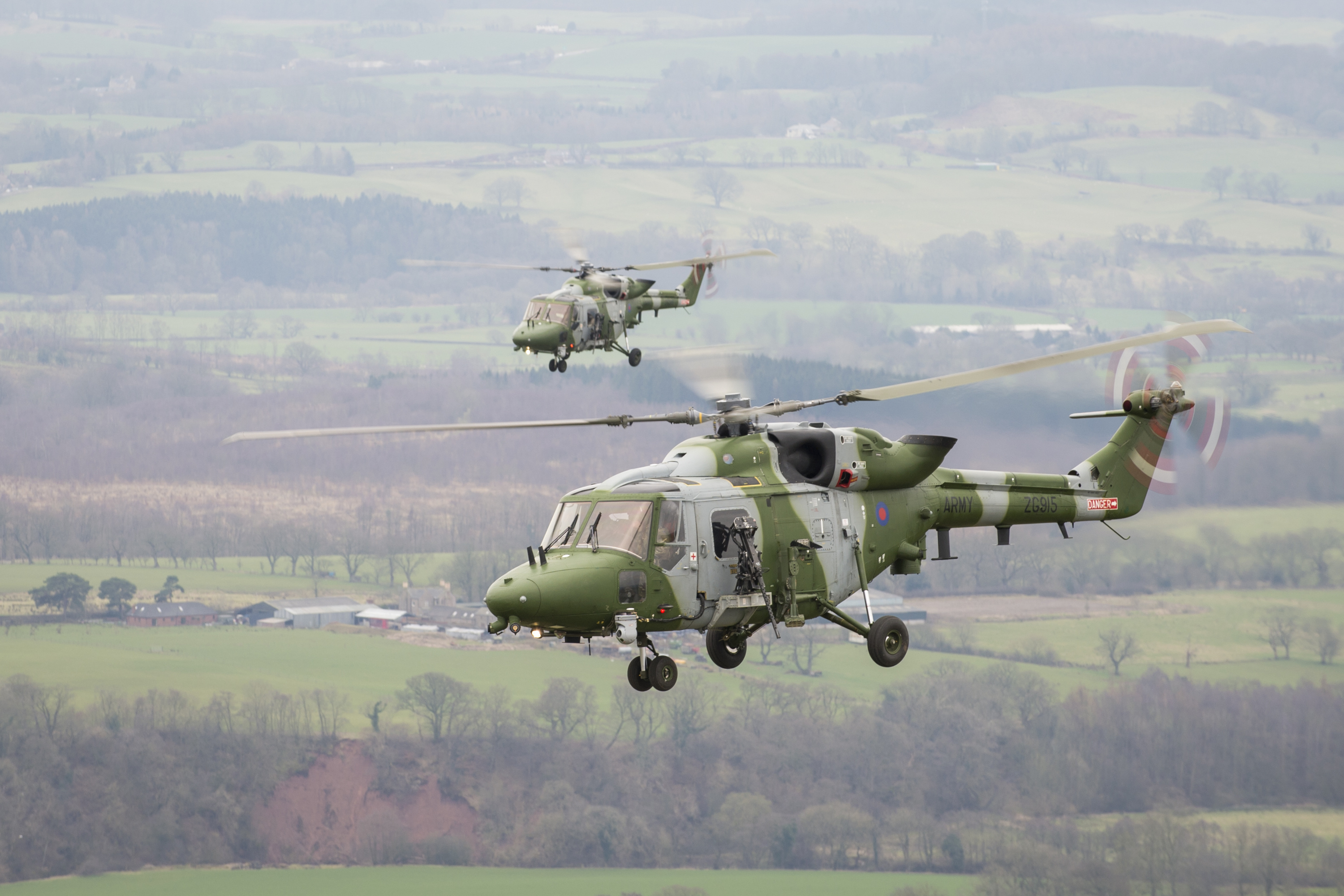
Two British Army AH.9As, 2015

Lynx AH.7
Further upgraded version for the Army Air Corps, with Gem 41-1 engines and uprated gearbox of the AH.5 and new, larger, composite material tail rotor. Later refitted with BERP type rotor blades. Twelve new builds and 107 Lynx AH.1s converted. A small number also used by the Fleet Air Arm in support of the Royal Marines. The Lynx AH.7 can also be outfitted for the anti-armour role, with the attachment of two pylons, each carrying four TOW anti-tank guided missiles. In the light-lift role, it can carry an aircrew member armed with a cabin door mounted L7 General Purpose Machine Gun (GPMG), as well as troops for fast-rope or abseiling insertions, or regular landings. It can also transport cargo. Now replaced in the attack role by the AgustaWestland Apache attack helicopter.
Lynx AH.7(DAS)
AH.7 with Defensive Aids Subsystem.
Lynx AH.9 ("Battlefield Lynx")
Utility version for the Army Air Corps, based on AH.7, but with wheeled undercarriage and further upgraded gearbox. Sixteen new-built plus eight converted from AH.7s.

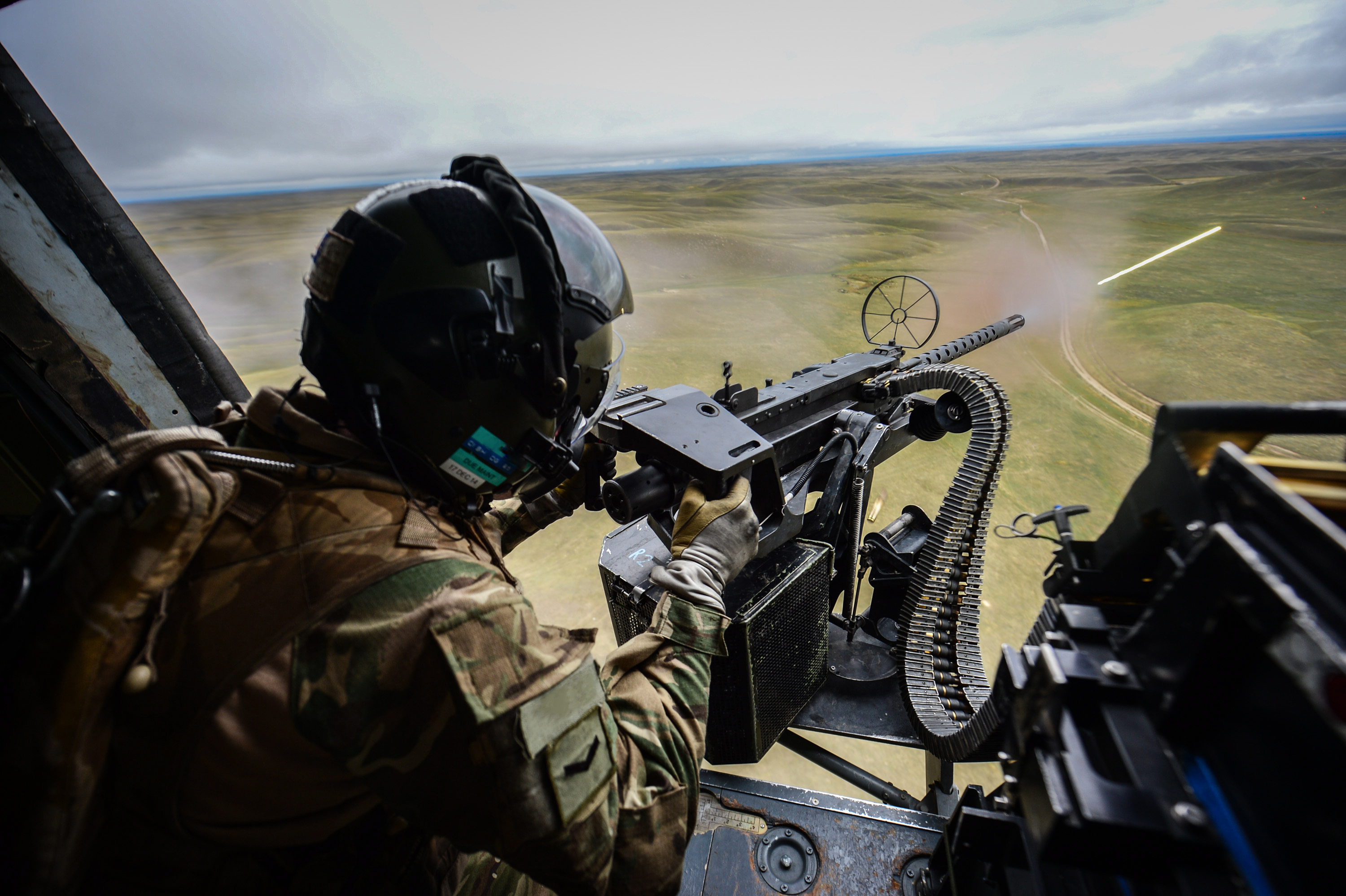
Firing a .50-inch heavy machine gun from a British Army AH.9A on exercise in BATUS, Canada

Lynx AH.9A
AH.9 with more powerful LHTEC CTS800-4N 1,015 kW (1,362 shp) engines, which allowed the door-mounted GPMG of the AH.7 to be replaced with a .50-inch (12.7 mm) heavy machine gun (HMG) as well as flight in hotter conditions. All 22 AH.9 were upgraded. A small number also used by the Fleet Air Arm in support of the Royal Marines.

=== Naval variants ===
Lynx HAS.2 / Mk.2(FN)
Initial production version for the Royal Navy (HAS.2) and the French Navy (Mk.2(FN)), powered by Gem 2 engines and with wheeled undercarriage, folding rotors and tail and deck lock. HAS.2 equipped with British Sea Spray radar, the Mk.2(FN) with French radar and dipping sonar. When it is used in the anti-submarine role, it can carry two torpedoes or depth charges. For anti-surface warfare, it is equipped with either four Sea Skua missiles (Royal Navy) or four AS.12 missiles (French Navy). 60 built for Royal Navy, and 26 for France.
Lynx HAS.2.5
An interim HAS 3 equipped with the improved Gem 42 series engines but the original HAS 2 gearbox. Only used by 702 NAS in 1985/86 before all were converted to full HAS 3 standard.

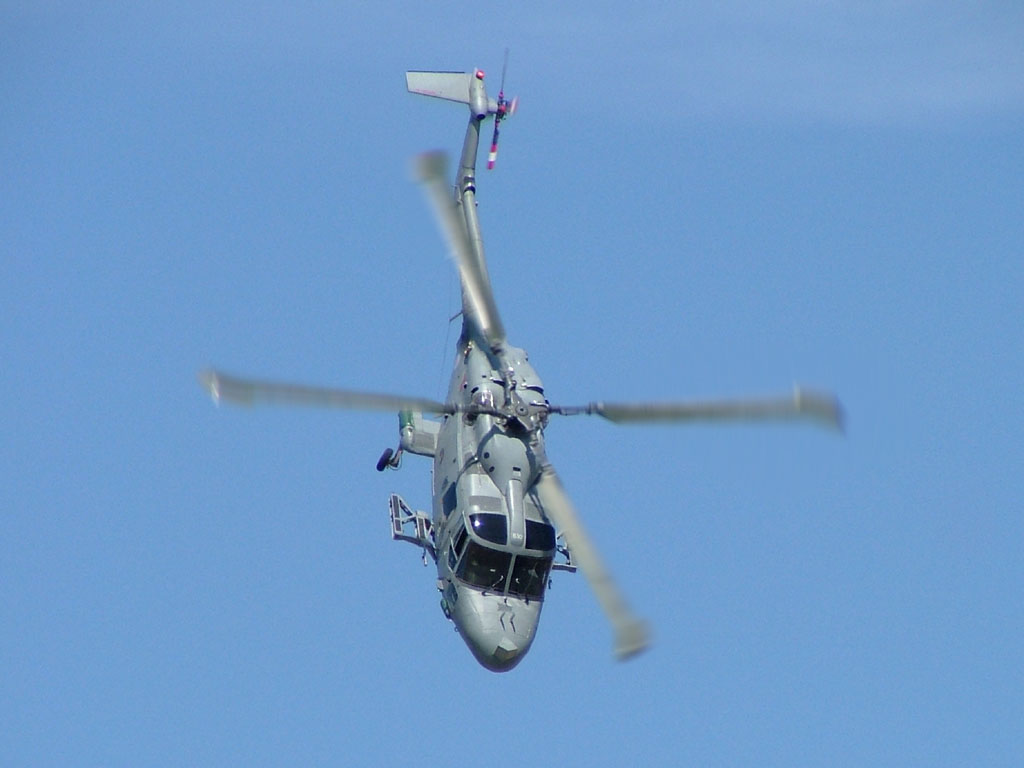
Lynx HAS.3 of the Black Cats (Royal Navy) display team

Lynx HAS.3
Improved version of HAS.2 powered by Gem 42-1 engines and with upgraded gearbox. Thirty built from new, with deliveries starting in March 1982 and all remaining HAS.2s (53 aircraft) converted to HAS.3 standards.
Lynx HAS.3GM
Modified HAS.3 helicopters for the Royal Navy, for service in the Persian Gulf, with improved electronic warfare equipment, revised Identification Friend or Foe (IFF) and provision for Forward looking infrared (FLIR) under fuselage. Originally deployed for the 1990–91 Gulf War. Designated HAS.3S/GM when fitted with secure radios. .GM denotes 'Gulf Modification'.
Lynx HAS.3S
Improved version of the HAS.3 for the Royal Navy fitted with secure radio systems.
Lynx HAS.3SGM
An improved HAS.3GM with integrated Secure V/UHF communications, Mode 4 IFF, Loral Challenger ALQ 157 Infra Red Countermeasures turrets (fitted on the fuselage side high up just behind the Pilot's/Observer's doors), M130 Chaff/Flare dispensers and provision for Sandpiper Forward looking infrared (FLIR) mounted under the port side inboard weapon carrier. First aircraft converted was XZ733, which deployed with the Type 22 frigate HMS Brave in January 1991 for Operation Granby, the British operations of the Gulf War).

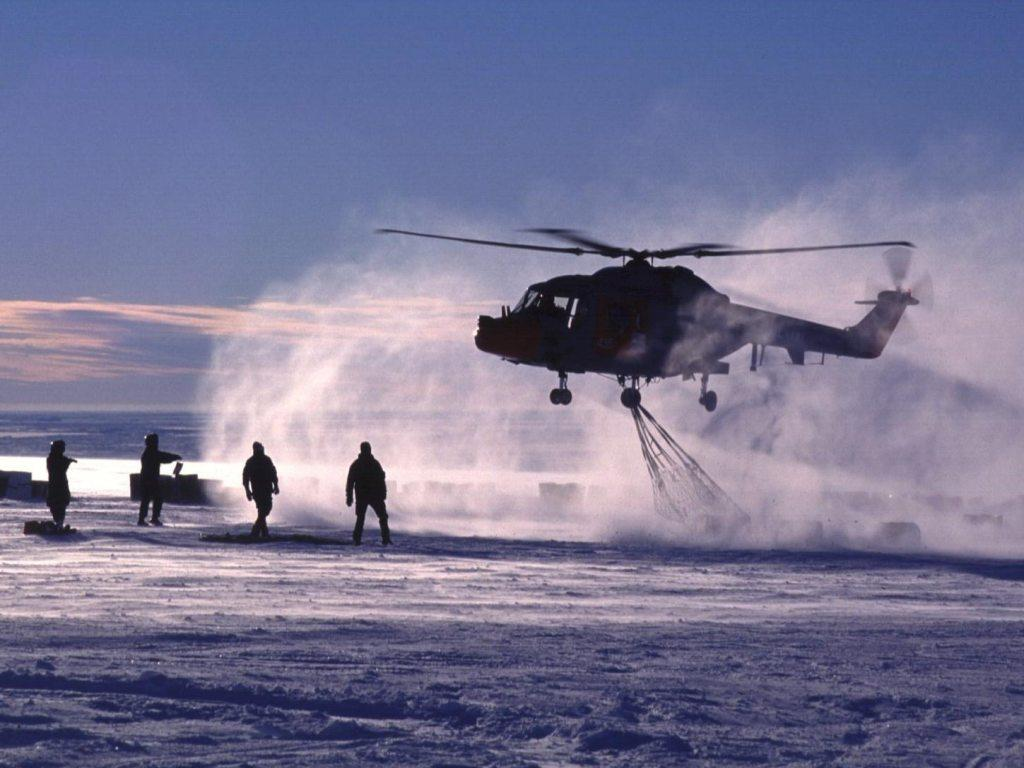
Royal Navy Lynx HAS.3(ICE(S)) supporting an Antarctic research base

Lynx HAS.3ICE
HAS.3 modified for Antarctic service aboard ice patrol ships HMS Endurance. Designated HAS.3SICE when fitted with secure radios.

Lynx HAS.3CTS
HAS.3 upgraded with avionics system proposed for HMA.8. Seven converted as test beds.

Lynx Mk.4(FN)
Upgraded version for the Aéronavale, with Gem 42-1 engines. Fourteen built.
Lynx HMA.8
Upgraded maritime attack version based on Super Lynx 100. Gem 42-200 engines, BERP type main rotors and larger tail rotor of AH.7. Fitted with FLIR in turret above nose, with radar moved to radome below nose.
Lynx HMA.8(DSP)
DSP from digital signal processor.
Lynx HMA.8(DAS)
DSP aircraft were modified with "Defensive Aids Subsystem".
Lynx HMA.8(SRU)
DAS aircraft modified with "Second-generation Anti-jam Tactical UHF Radio for NATO" (SATURN) radio upgrade. Incorporates "Successor to IFF" (SIFF).
Lynx HMA.8(CMP)
Combined Mods Programme. SRU aircraft modified with improved communications and defensive systems.

With all HMA.8 aircraft upgraded to CMP standard, HMA.8(CMP) aircraft were re-designated back to HMA.8(SRU). The Lynx HAS.8 fleet is currently undergoing further modifications, by the Lynx Operational Support Team, to improve self-defence, mission execution and survivability. These modifications will not affect the SRU designation.

=== Export variants ===
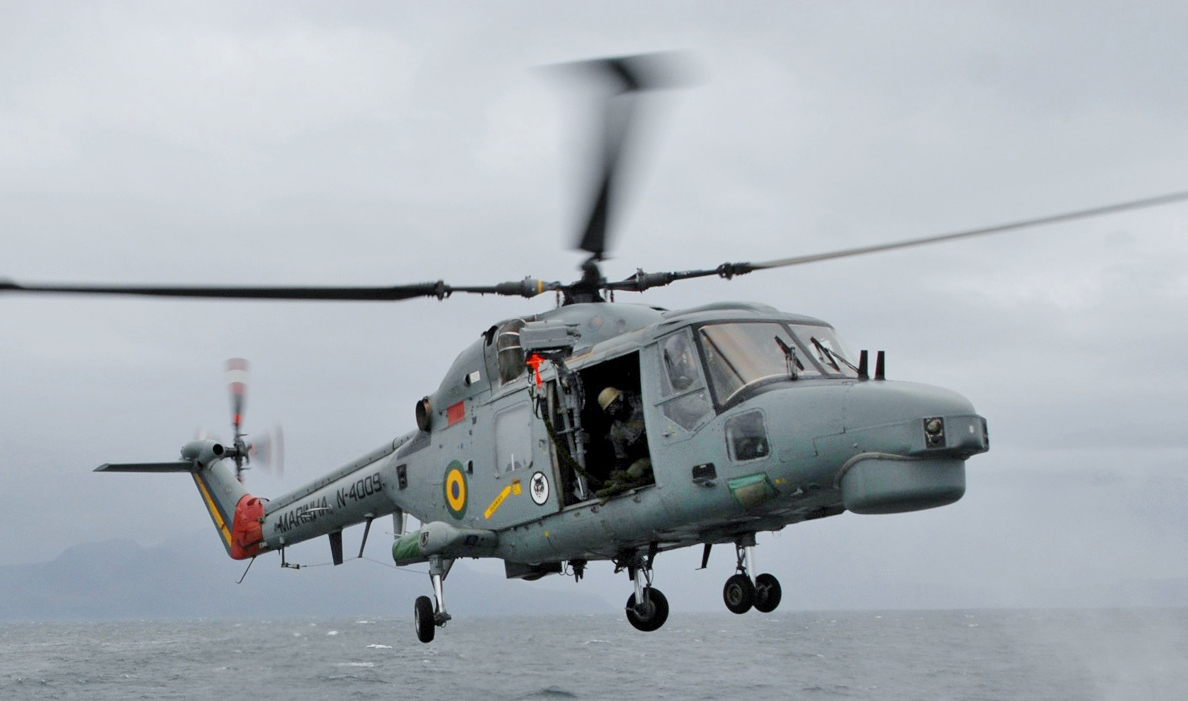
Super Lynx of the Brazilian Navy

Lynx Mk.21
Export version of the HAS.2 for the Brazilian Navy. Brazilian navy designation SAH-11. Nine delivered.
Super Lynx Mk.21A
Version of the Super Lynx (based on HAS.8) for the Brazilian navy, with Gem 42 engines and 360° traverse Seaspray 3000 radar under nose. Nine new build helicopters plus upgrades of remaining five original Mk.21s. Brazilian navy designation AH-11A.
Super Lynx Mk.21B
Upgrade of Mk.21A for Brazilian Navy, with CTS800 engines and updated avionics. Brazilian designation AH-11B. Eight to be upgraded.
Lynx Mk.22
Unbuilt export version for the Egyptian Navy.
Lynx Mk.23
Export version of the HAS.2 for the Argentine Navy. Two built. Grounded due to British embargo on spares following Falklands War. Single surviving helicopter later sold to Denmark. The two Lynx 23s took part in the Argentine invasion and occupation of the Falkland Island in March 1982 as part of Task Force 40; one was lost in an accident on Santisma Trinidad on 2 May 1982.
Lynx Mk.24
Unbuilt export utility version for the Iraqi army.

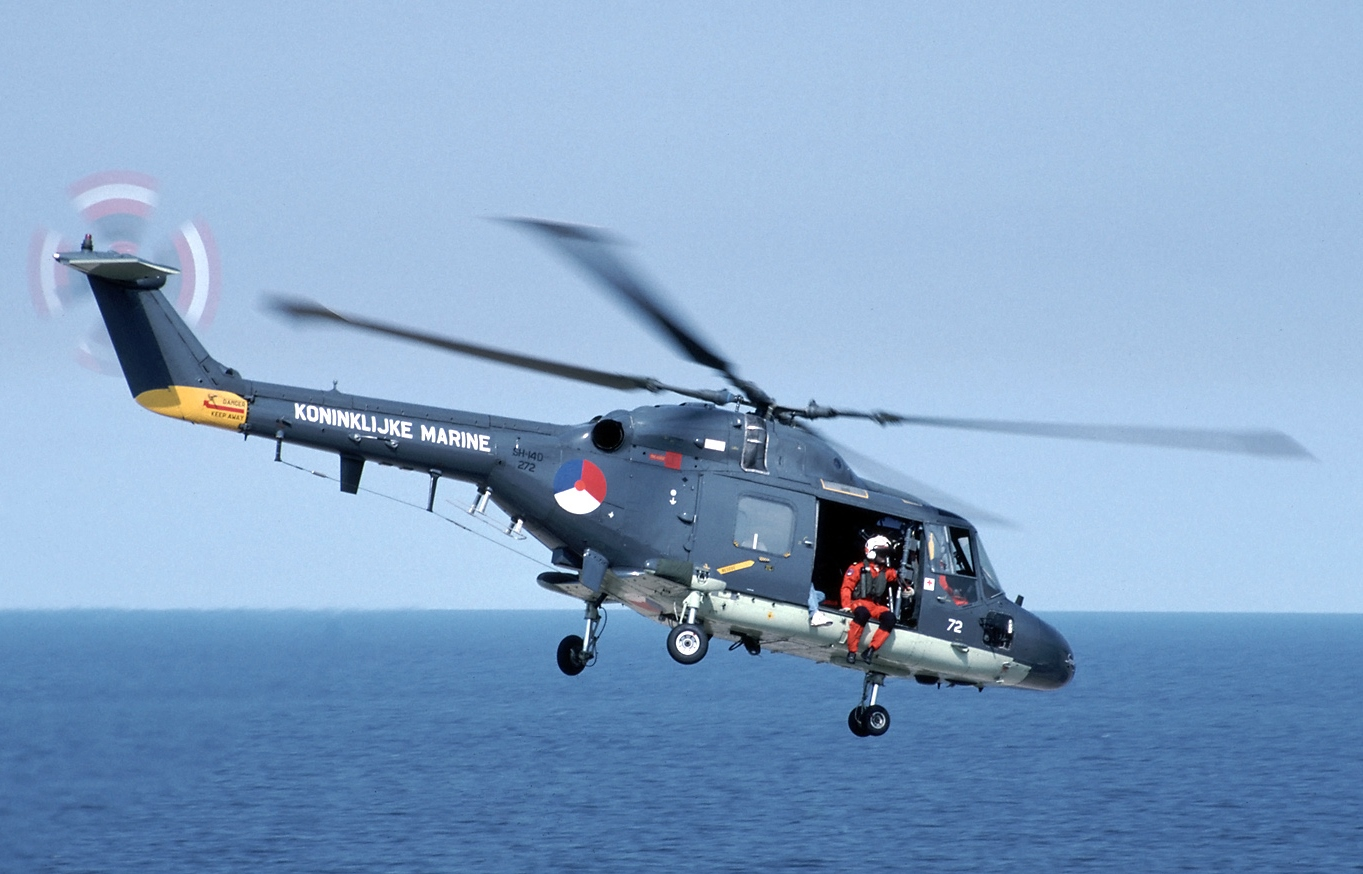
A Lynx Mk.25 with the Royal Netherlands Navy

Lynx Mk.25
Export version of the HAS.2 for the Royal Netherlands Navy. Designated UH-14A in Dutch service. Used for utility and SAR roles. Six built.
Lynx Mk.26
Unbuilt export armed version for the Iraqi army.
Lynx Mk.27
Export version for the Royal Netherlands Navy with 836 kW (1,120 kW) Gem 4 engines. Equipped for ASW missions with dipping sonar. Designated SH-14B in Dutch service. 10 built.
Lynx Mk.28
Export version of the AH.1 for the Qatar Police. Three built.
Lynx Mk.64
Export version of the Super Lynx for the South African Air Force.

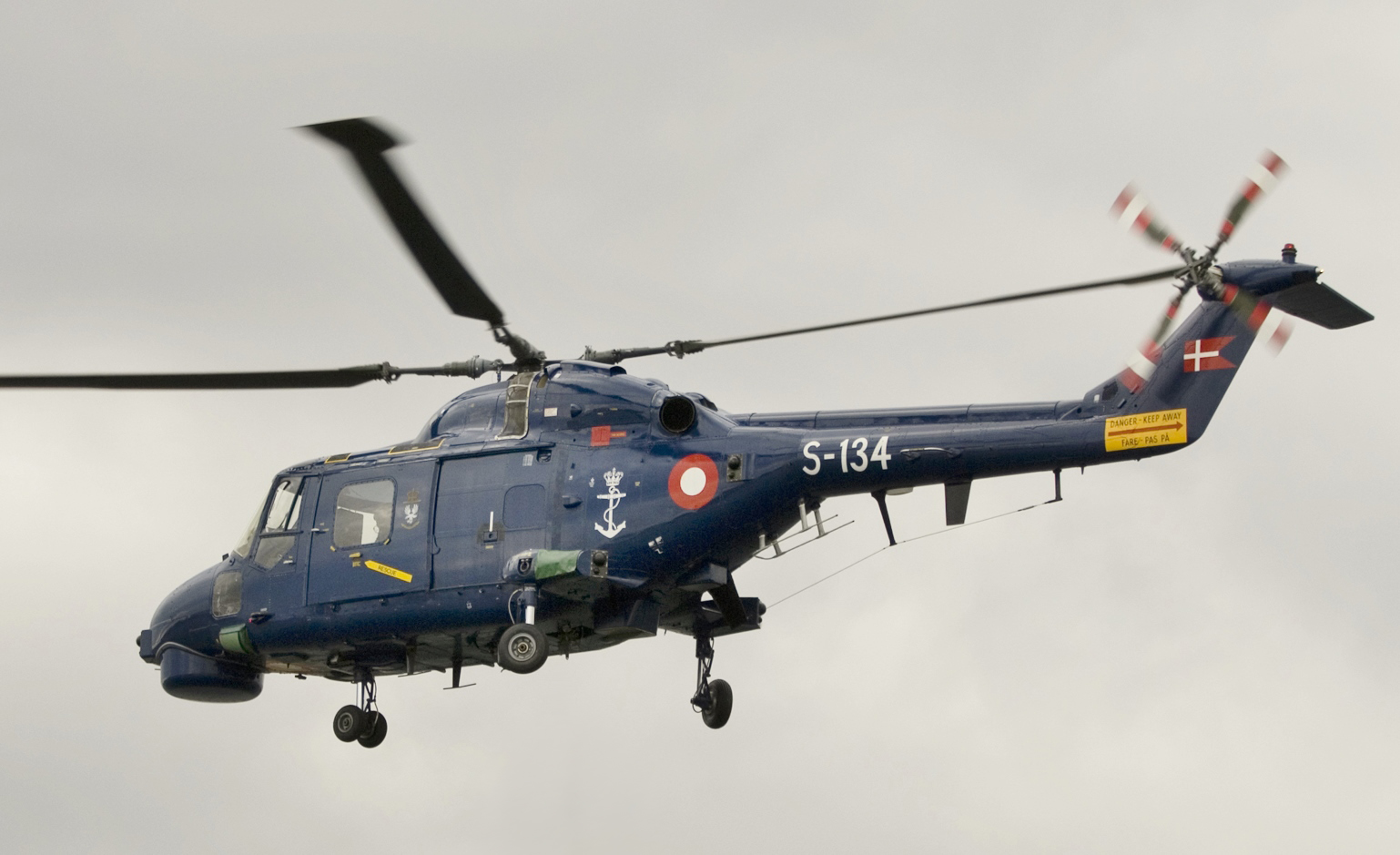
A Royal Danish Navy Lynx Mk.80

Lynx Mk.80
Export version for the Royal Danish Navy based on the HAS.3 with folding tail. Eight built.
Lynx Mk.81
Upgraded ASW version for the Royal Netherlands Navy, powered by Gem 41 engines with no sonar but fitted with towed Magnetic anomaly detector. Designated SH-14C in Dutch service, and mainly used for training and utility purposes. Eight built.
SH-14D
UH-14A/SH-14B/SH-14C Lynx upgraded to a common standard by the Royal Netherlands Navy under the STAMOL programme with Gem 42 engines, provision for dipping sonar and FLIR. 22 upgraded.
Lynx Mk.82
Unbuilt export version for the Egyptian army.
Lynx Mk.83
Unbuilt export version for the Saudi Arabian army.
Lynx Mk 84
Unbuilt export version for the Qatar army.
Lynx Mk 85
Unbuilt export version for the United Arab Emirates army.
Lynx Mk.86
Export SAR version of the HAS.2 for the Royal Norwegian Air Force.
Lynx Mk.87
Embargoed export version for the Argentine navy. Two completed and sold to Denmark as Mk.90
Lynx Mk.88
Export version for the German Navy with Gem 42 engines, and dipping sonar. Nineteen built.
Super Lynx Mk.88A
Upgraded export version for the German Navy with Gem 42 engines, under-nose radome with 360° traverse radar and FLIR above nose. Seven new build helicopters plus conversion of 17 Mk.88s.
Lynx Mk.89
Export version of HAS.3 for the Nigerian navy. Three built.
Lynx Mk.90
Export version for the Royal Danish Navy, modified from embargoed Argentine Mk.87s. Lynx Mk.90A is the upgraded version. The Lynx Mk.90 and Mk.90A were upgraded to Super Lynx standard and designated Mk.90B.
Lynx Mk.95
Former version of Super Lynx for the Portuguese Navy, with Bendix radar in undernose radome, dipping sonar but no FLIR. Three new build plus two converted ex-Royal Navy HAS.3s. The Lynx Mk.95A is the new version for the Portuguese Navy. It has been upgraded since 2020 with CTS 800 engines, new glass cockpit, tactical processor, new avionics and new electrically powered rescue hoist.

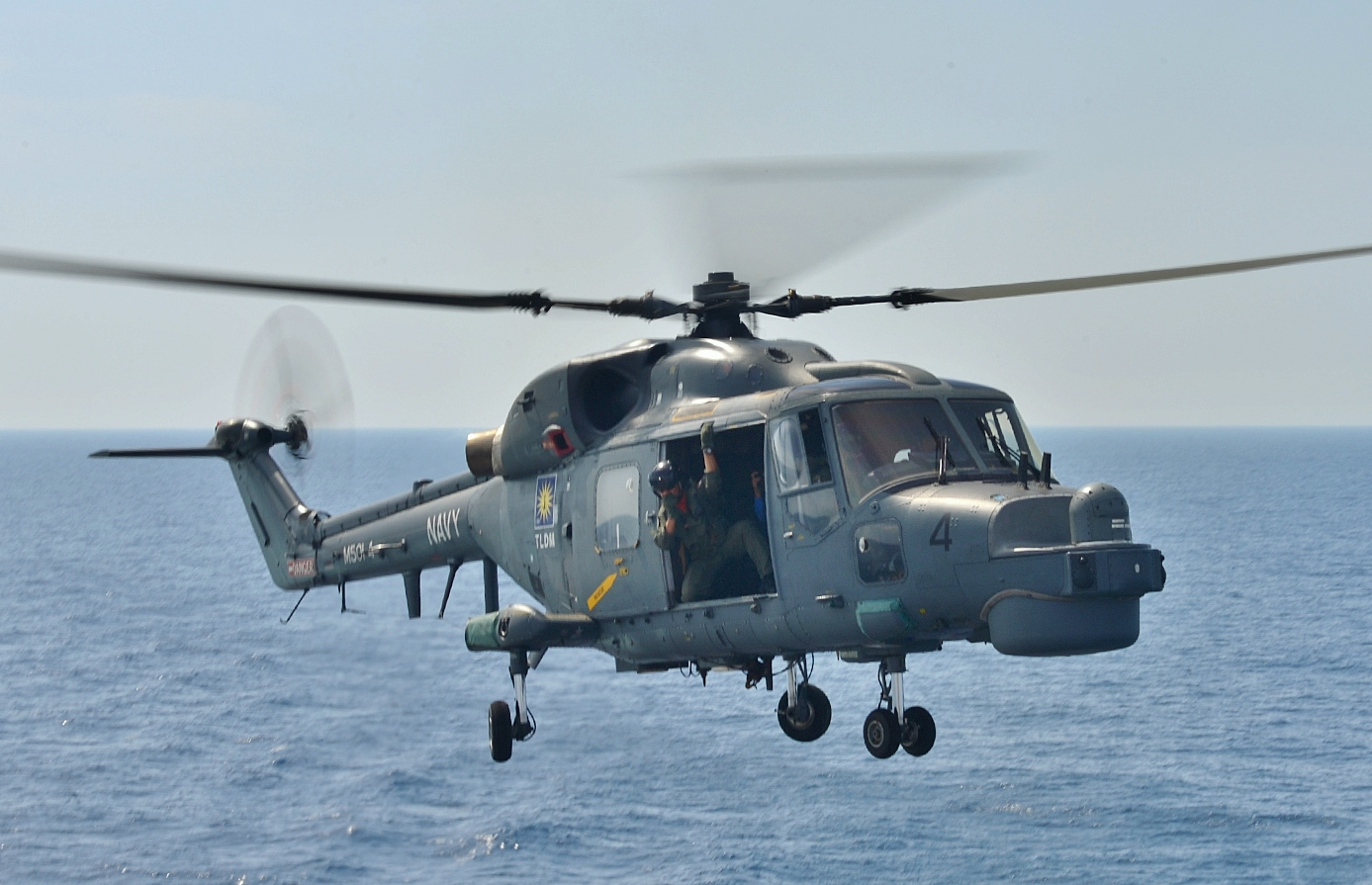
Super Lynx of the Royal Malaysian Navy

Super Lynx Mk.99
Version of Super Lynx for the South Korean Navy, with Seaspray 3 radar in undernose radome, dipping sonar, and FLIR, for anti-submarine and anti-ship operations. Twelve were built. Super Lynx Mk.99A is the upgraded version with improved rotor, with a further 13 built.
Super Lynx Mk.100
Super Lynx for the Royal Malaysian Navy, with 990 kW (1,327 hp) CTS-800-4N engines. Six built.

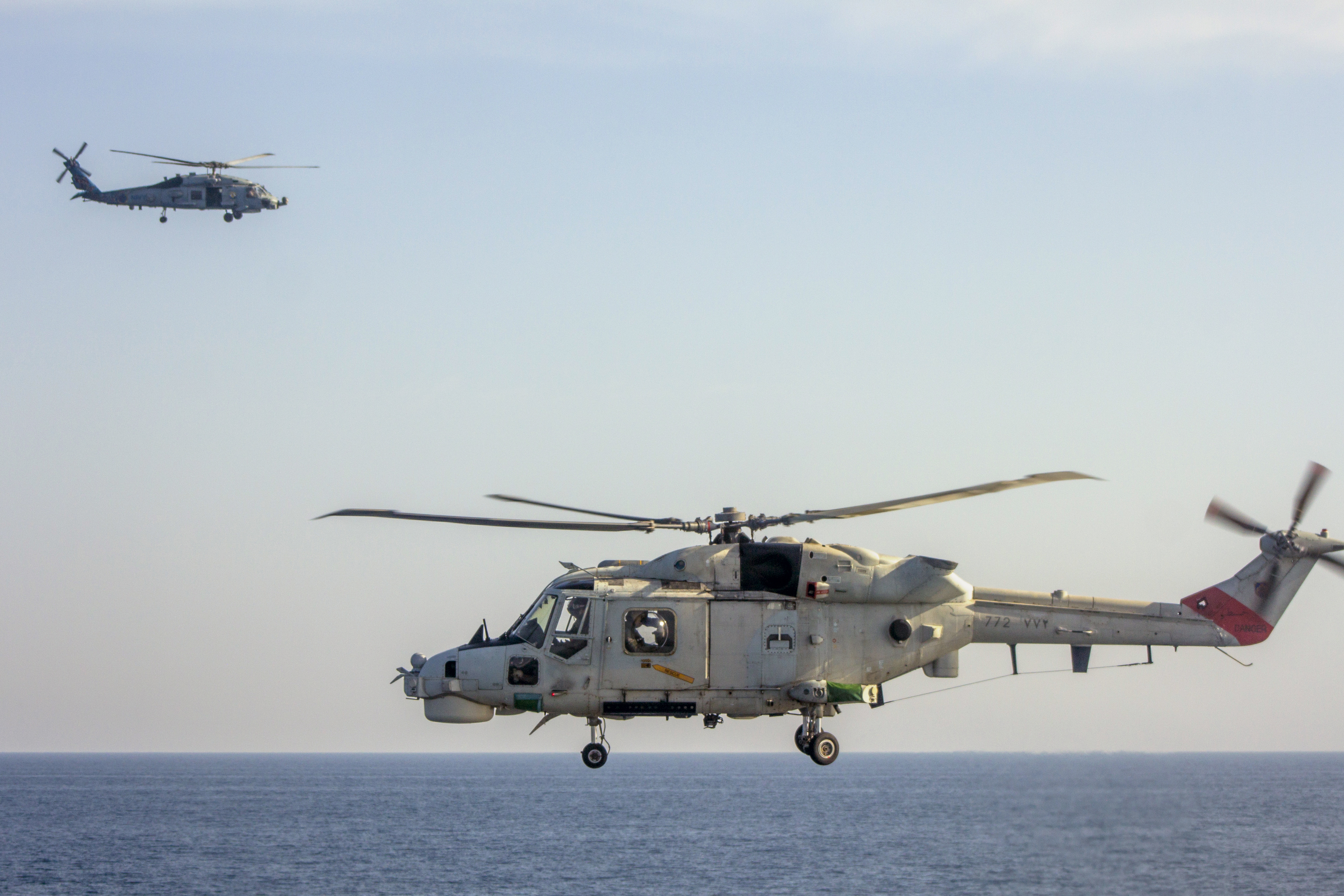
Omani Super Lynx 120 with US Seahawk behind

Super Lynx Mk.110
Super Lynx 300 for Thai Navy. Four ordered. Locally designated H.TPh.1 (Thai: ฮ.ตผ.๑).
Super Lynx Mk.120
Export version for the Royal Air Force of Oman. 16 built.
Super Lynx Mk.130
Export version for the Algerian Navy. Four ordered.
Super Lynx 300
Advanced Super Lynx with CTS-800-4N engines.

=== Projects ===
Lynx HT.3
Proposed training version for the Royal Air Force, not built.
Lynx 3
Enhanced Lynx variant with Westland 30 tail boom and rotor, Gem 60 engines, new wheeled tricycle undercarriage and MIL-STD-1553 databus. Only one prototype built (serial/registration ZE477 / G-17-24) in 1984.
Battlefield Lynx
Proposed export version of Lynx AH.9.
Battlefield Lynx 800
Proposed export version of Lynx AH.9 with LHTEC T800 engines, the project was suspended in 1992. One demonstrator helicopter was built and flight tested.
Lynx ACH
Proposed Advanced Compound Helicopter (ACH) technology demonstrator, partly funded by the Ministry of Defence. Announced in May 1998, the ACH was planned to be powered by RTM322 engines with variable area exhaust nozzles and a gearbox from the Westland 30-200; they have wings attached at cabin roof level and BERP rotor blades. It was predicted to fly approximately 50% faster than a standard Lynx.
Westland 606
Proposed civilian variant.

Westland 606-10 proposed civil variant powered by Pratt & Whitney PT6-34B engines.
Westland 606-20 proposed civil variant powered by Gem engines.

Notes: AH=Army Helicopter, HAS=Helicopter, Anti-Submarine, HMA=Helicopter, Maritime Attack,, (S)=Secure speech radio

=== Derivatives ===
Westland 30
Medium helicopter based on the Lynx, using some dynamic systems with a new, enlarged fuselage for up to 22 passengers.
AgustaWestland AW159 Wildcat
Further development of the Super Lynx with two LHTEC CTS800 engines; previously known as the Future Lynx.

== Operators ==
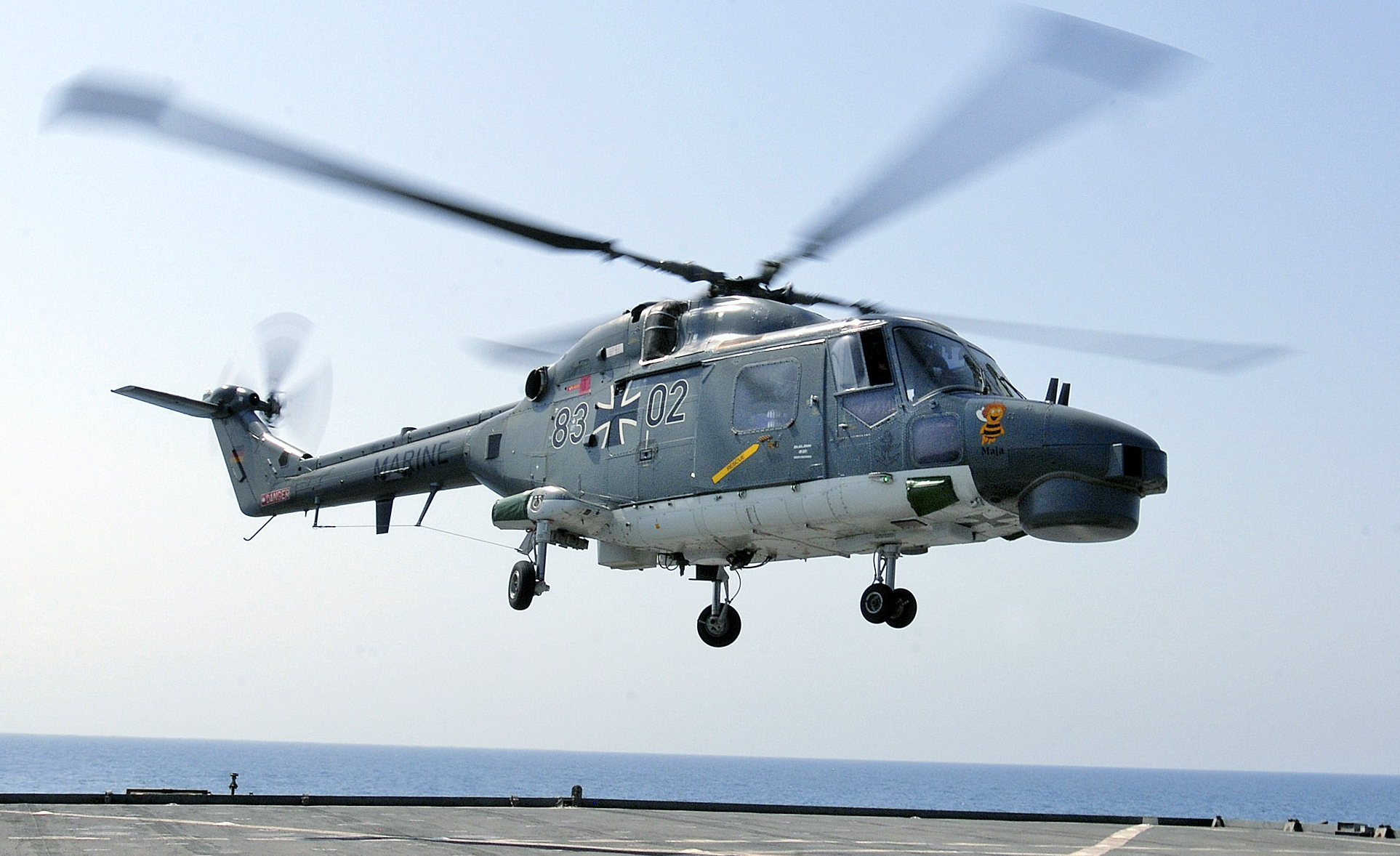
German Lynx departs USS Whidbey Island

Algeria

- Algerian Navy

Brazil

- Brazilian Navy

Germany

- German Navy

Malaysia

- Royal Malaysian Navy

Oman

- Royal Navy of Oman/Royal Air Force of Oman

Portugal

- Portuguese Navy

South Africa

- South African Air Force

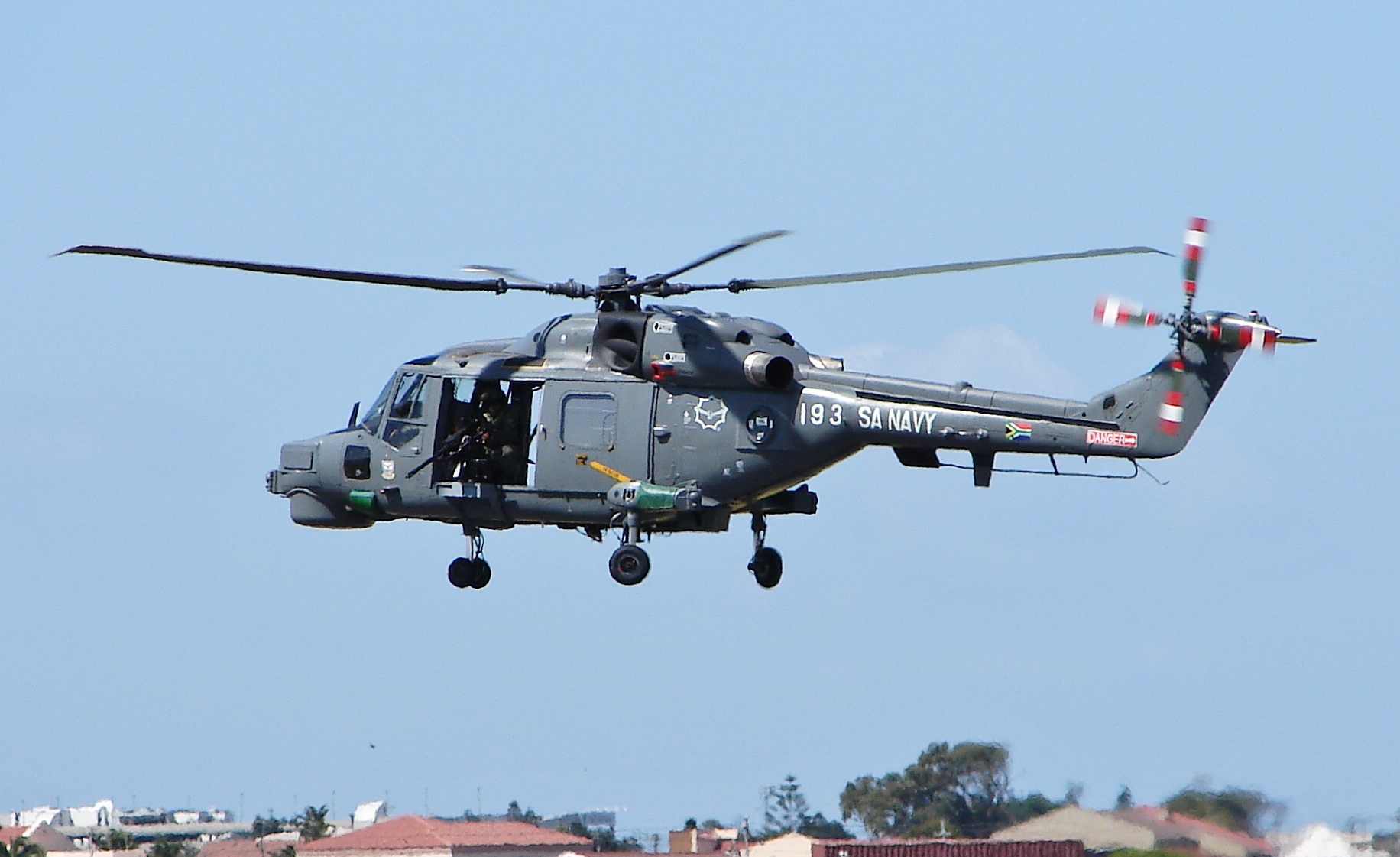
Lynx of the South African Navy

South Korea

- Republic of Korea Navy

Thailand

- Royal Thai Navy

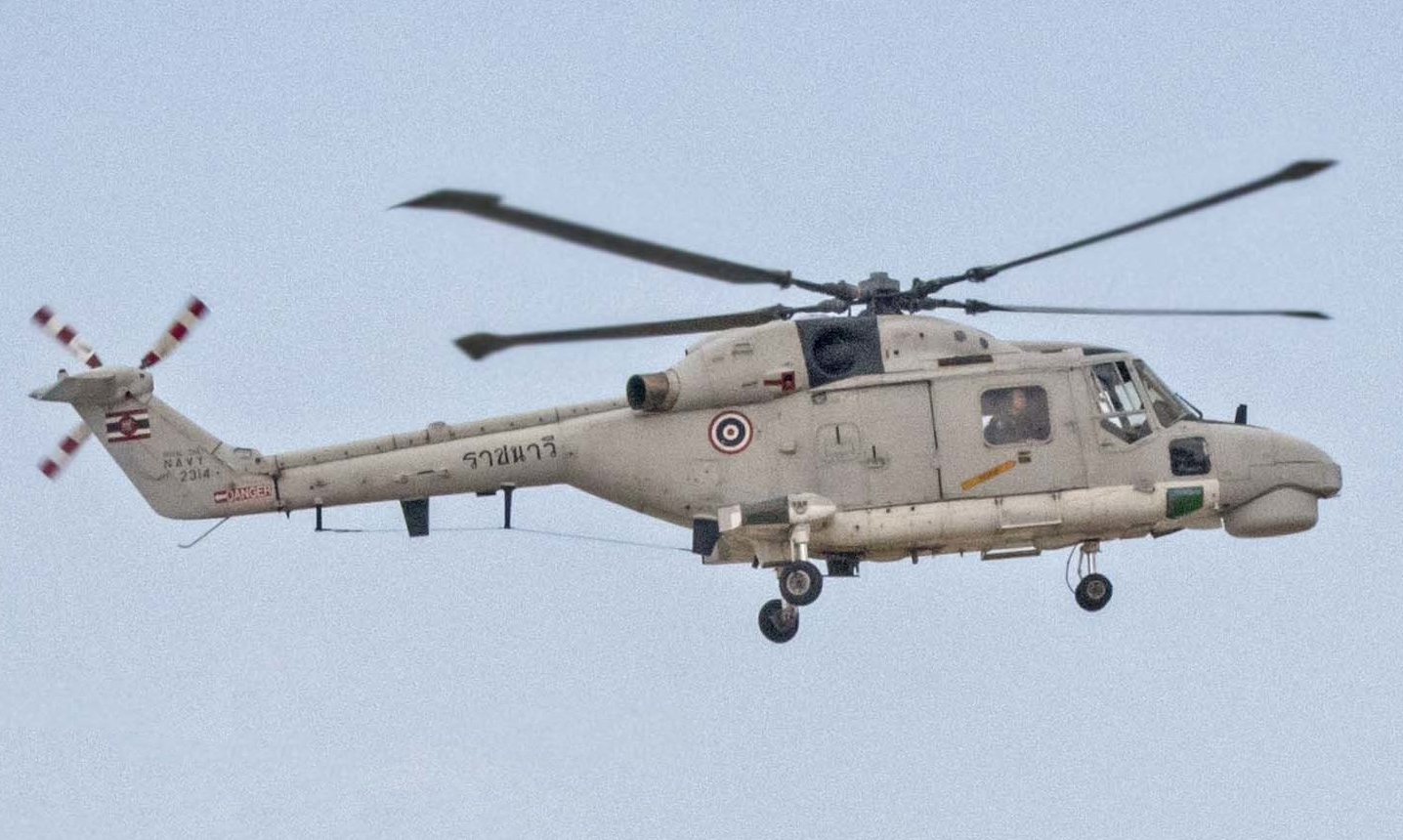
A Royal Thai Navy Lynx

=== Former operators ===
Argentina

- Argentine Navy

Denmark

- Royal Danish Navy
- Royal Danish Air Force

France

- French Navy

Netherlands

- Royal Netherlands Navy

Nigeria

- Nigerian Navy

Norway

- Royal Norwegian Air Force

Pakistan

- Pakistan Navy

Qatar

- Qatar Police

United Kingdom

- Royal Navy
- British Army

== Aircraft on display ==
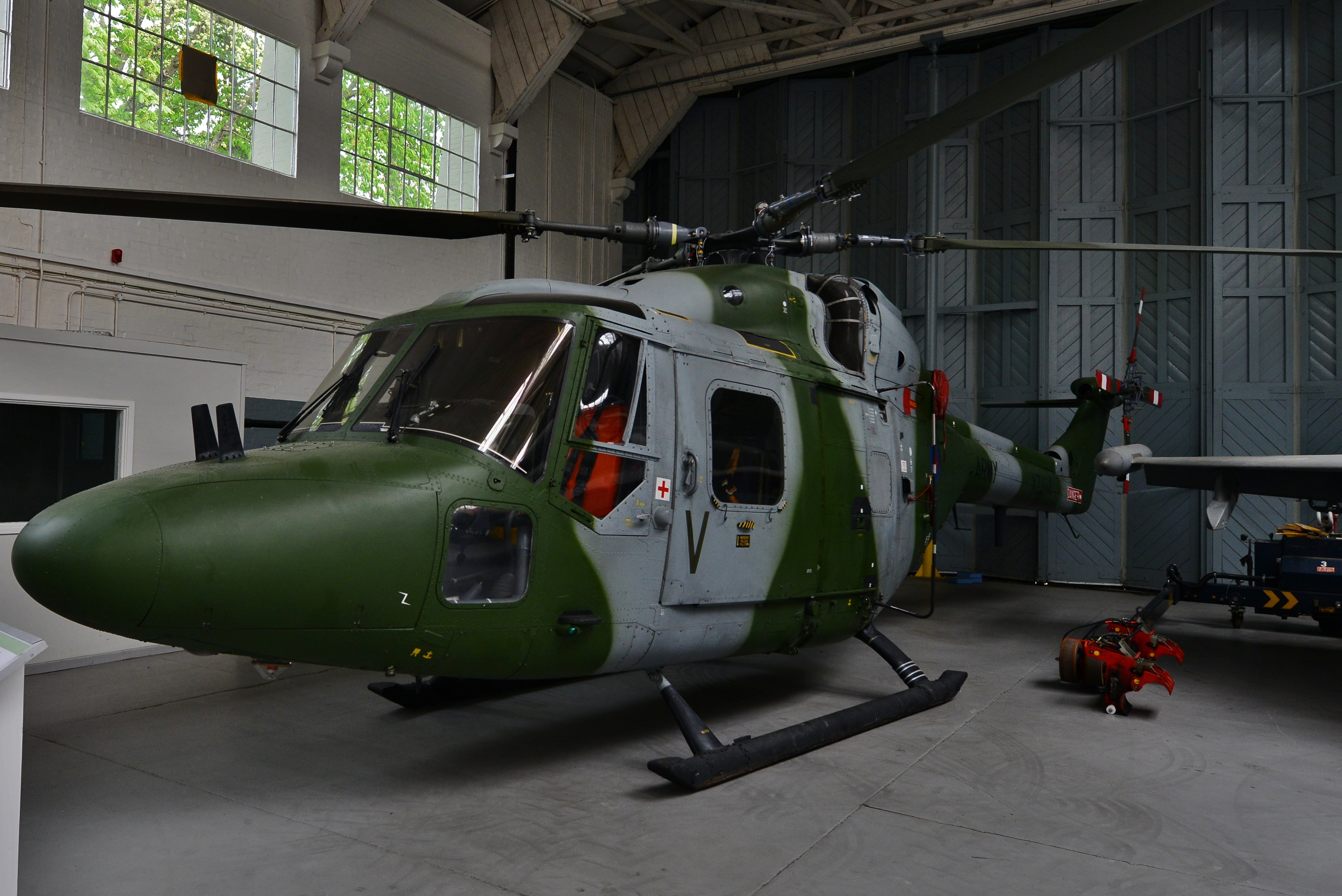
Retired Westland Lynx, at Duxford Imperial War Museum, 2015

- G-LYNX, Westland's former demonstrator, is preserved at The Helicopter Museum, Weston-super-Mare
- ZE477, the Lynx-3 prototype, is on display at The Helicopter Museum, Weston-super-Mare
- XZ720 is preserved at the Fleet Air Arm Museum, Yeovilton
- XZ194, a Lynx AH.7, is on display at Imperial War Museum Duxford
- XZ185, a Lynx AH.7, is on display at the Pima Air & Space Museum, Arizona
- XZ246, a Lynx HAS.3ICE, is on display at the South Yorkshire Aircraft Museum, Doncaster
- XZ722, a Lynx HMA.8, is on display at the Pima Air & Space Museum, Arizona
- 239-UA, a Lynx AH.7 Airframe, is used as a game zone prop at Driver Wood Activity Centre, Copthorne, West Sussex
- ZG921, a Lynx AH.9A, is on display at the National Army Museum in Chelsea, London
- ZD280, a Lynx AH.7, is on display at the Farnborough Air Sciences Trust in Farnborough, Hampshire
- A Westland Lynx (Lynx Mk.86) once flown by the Royal Norwegian Air Force is on display at the Norwegian Aviation Museum in Bodø, Norway
- A Westland Lynx (Lynx Mk.86) once flown by the Royal Norwegian Air Force is on display at the Norwegian Armed Forces Aircraft Collection, at Gardermoen outside Oslo, Norway
- 21, a former Pakistan Navy Westland Lynx (HAS.3SGM) is on display at the Pakistan Maritime Museum, Karachi.

== Specifications (Super Lynx Series 100) ==
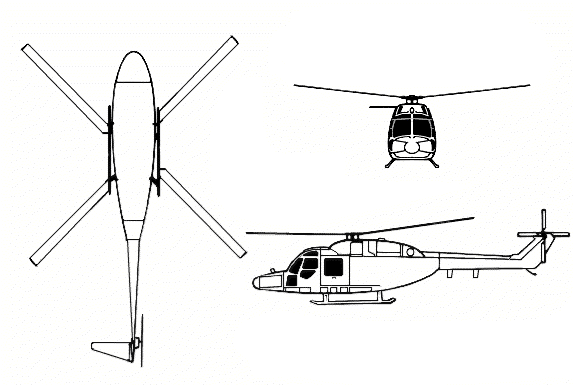

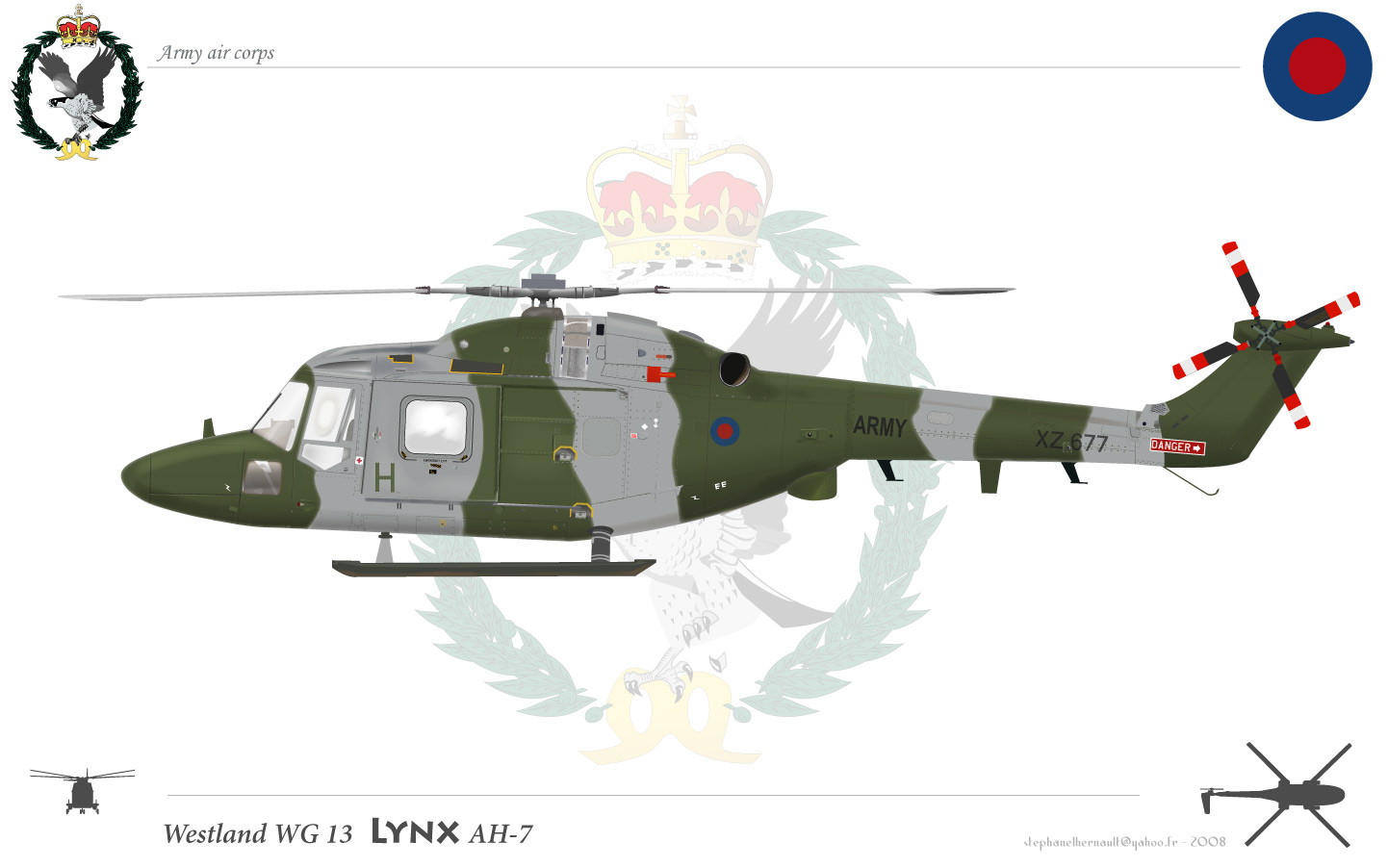
Rendering of a Lynx in Army Air Corps livery

Data from Jane's All the World's Aircraft 2005-06, British Army

General characteristics

- Crew: 2-3
- Capacity: 8 troops / 3,000 lb (1,361 kg) maximum underslung load
- Length: 43 ft 9.25 in (13.3414 m) including tail-rotor
- Length overall: 50 ft (15.24 m)
- Length folded: 35 ft 7.25 in (10.85 m)
- Width folded: 9 ft 7.75 in (2.94 m)
- Height folded: 10 ft 8 in (3.25 m)
- Height: 12 ft 0.5 in (3.670 m) including tail-rotor
- Empty weight: 7,225 lb (3,277 kg)
- Operating weight:

- ASW mission 10,181 lb (4,618 kg) (2x torpedo)
- ASV mission 9,641 lb (4,373 kg) (2x Sea Skua)
- Surveillance and targeting mission 8,174 lb (3,708 kg)
- SAR mission 8,329 lb (3,778 kg)

- Max takeoff weight: 11,750 lb (5,330 kg)
- Fuel capacity: 210 imp gal (252 US gal; 955 L) usable internal fuel + optional 75.9 imp gal (91 US gal; 345 L) cabin tank or 2x 97 imp gal (116 US gal; 441 L) ferry tanks
- Maximum usable fuel capacity: 411 imp gal (494 US gal; 1,868 L)
- Powerplant: 2 × LHTEC CTS800-4N turboshaft engines, 1,362 shp (1,016 kW) each for take-off, 1,267 shp (945 kW) maximum continuous
- or 2x Rolls-Royce Gem 42-1 - 1,000 / 890 shp (746 / 664 kW)
- Main rotor diameter: 42 ft 0 in (12.80 m)
- Main rotor area: 1,385.4 sq ft (128.71 m^{2})
- Blade sections: - root: RAE 9648; tip: RAE 9645/9643

Performance

- Maximum speed: 175 kn (201 mph, 324 km/h)
- Range: 285 nmi (328 mi, 528 km)
- Combat range: 540 nmi (620 mi, 1,000 km) with auxiliary fuel
  - ASW 20 nmi (23 mi; 37 km) with dipping sonar + one torpedo and 2 hours on station
  - Point attack: 125 nmi (144 mi; 232 km) with 4x Sea Skua
  - Surveillance: 75 nmi (86 mi; 139 km) - 3 hours 50 minutes on station
- Endurance: 5 hours 20 minutes with auxiliary fuel
- Disk loading: 41.4 lb/sq ft (202 kg/m^{2}) max
- Power/mass: 0.1565 shp/lb (0.2573 kW/kg)

Armament

- Naval: 2 × torpedoes or 4 × Sea Skua missiles or 2 × depth charges
- Attack: 1 × 20mm Oerlikon cannon, 2 × 70mm rocket pods CRV7, 8 × TOW ATGM
- General: 7.62 mm General Purpose Machine Guns (AH.7 and AH.9), 0.50 inch Browning AN/M3M heavy machine guns (HAS.3, HMA.8 and AH.9A)

== See also ==
Related development

- AgustaWestland AW159 Wildcat
- Westland 30

Aircraft of comparable role, configuration, and era

- Bell UH-1N Twin Huey
- Kaman SH-2 Seasprite
- Sikorsky SH-60 Seahawk
- Sikorsky UH-60 Black Hawk

Related lists

- List of active United Kingdom military aircraft
- List of aircraft of the Army Air Corps (United Kingdom)
- List of utility helicopters
