= Joint Attack Helicopter Instrumented Evaluation =

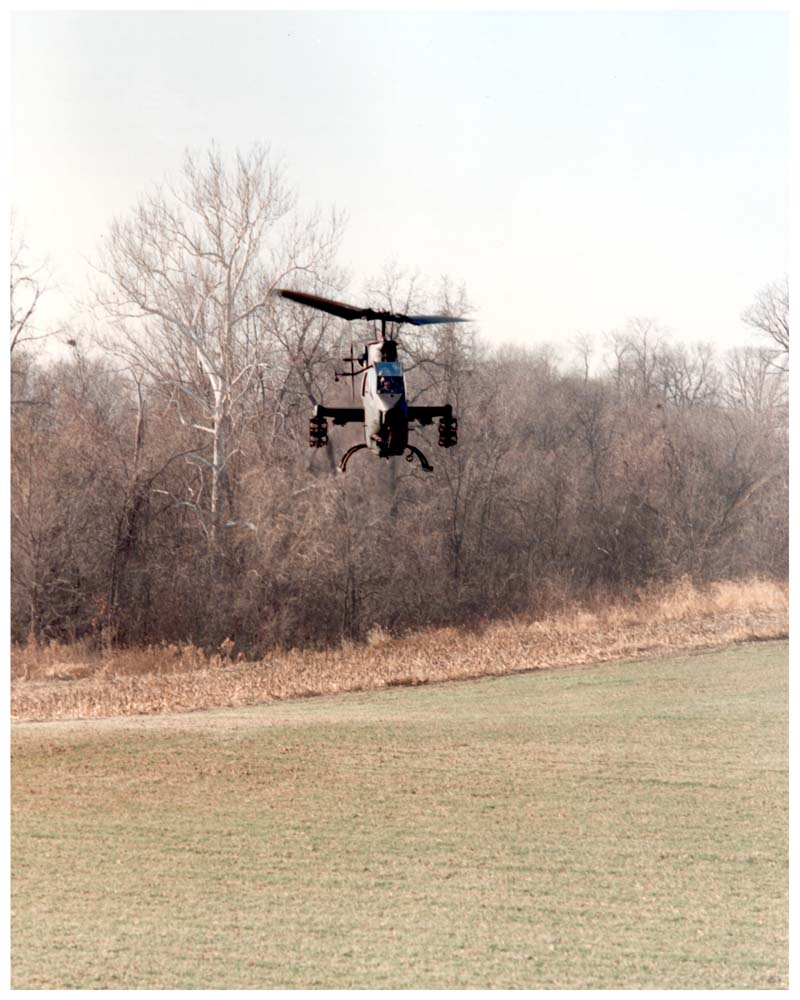
Masking their approach behind trees, TOW-firing Cobras proved to be devastatingly effective anti-tank weapons.

The Joint Attack Helicopter Instrumented Evaluation was a series of military exercises that tested the use of attack helicopters against simulated Warsaw Pact formations. They were carried out near Ansbach, Germany, between March and May 1972, primarily by units of the US 7th Army and the German Army, with active participation from the Canadian Army. In historical works, they are often known as the Ansbach Tests.

Blue Force was equipped primarily with TOW-firing AH-1 Cobras supported by OH-58 Kiowa scout helicopters, while Red Force combined German Leopard tanks and US Vulcan air defense vehicles representing a typical Warsaw Pact (WTO) armored brigade. Blue Force lost 10 helicopters while destroying 167 tanks and 29 Vulcans.

In the 1950s, the NATO response to an attack by the WTO would be "massive retaliation" with tactical nuclear weapons, and conventional forces were seen as secondary and often ignored. By the early 1970s, this had resulted in a huge disparity in tank numbers, with the WTO having about 14,000 tanks to NATOs 5,500. The 1969 Nixon Doctrine's flexible response strategy required a non-nuclear answer to this disparity. The Ansbach Tests suggested this could be a force of a few hundred attack helicopters, which could be purchased and deployed for a fraction of the cost of an equivalent tank fleet.

This sparked off one of the most intense debates in the long history of tank-versus-antitank arguments. US Army doctrine to that point was that "the best defense against a tank is another tank," but proponents of the helicopter claimed that "the attack helicopter represents the final resolution of the tank-antitank debate". In the years following the tests, the Army began converting their Cobras to the eight-TOW AH-1S model and changing their role to be primarily anti-tank vehicles.

== Background ==
Ansbach was carried out as a result of several previous events and studies stretching out over a decade. Among them were the 1960 Rogers Board recommendations on Army aircraft development, which had comments about the development of the helicopter as a combat vehicle. In April 1962, Robert McNamara sent a directive to the Army to broaden its thinking about air operations and try to avoid inventing yet-another logistics vehicle. These comments led to the formation of the Howze Board, which enthusiastically supported the use of helicopters in combat. The increasing use and specialization of helicopters during the Vietnam War served to drive these concepts home, and in 1965 the Army began the Advanced Aerial Fire Support System (AAFSS) to develop its first dedicated attack helicopter.

In 1966, the British Army of the Rhine ran a series of tests known as Exercise Hell Tank with the goal of testing the use of anti-tank missiles against simulated WTO forces. This suggested the helicopter was a potent weapon, so a larger test was planned for the next fall. In Hell Tank IV in October 1967, the helicopters ran up a 45-to-0 score over tanks that were executing a breakout. The tests also demonstrated that the helicopters were much less useful against tanks in defensive positions with their engines turned off, making them very difficult to spot from the air.

While these events were occurring, in 1969 US President Richard Nixon formulated the Nixon Doctrine, which called for the US to exit Vietnam and leave the combat to ARVN, a process later known as Vietnamization. It also re-focused the military on combat against Soviet-led forces in Europe. Through this period the USSR had reached a level of parity in strategic nuclear weapons, and US leaders concluded that employing nuclear weapons in any form might lead to mutual annihilation. Given the WTO's 3-to-1 superiority in tanks, NATO would lose a ground war with or without the use of tactical nuclear weapons, and that only the "macabre option" of a strategic exchange might save it.

Given increasing fiscal restraint, the Army simply could not purchase enough tanks to offset this imbalance, and the attack helicopter appeared to be an alternative that was "a relatively cheap, flexible and highly potent weapons system".

== Trial by fire ==
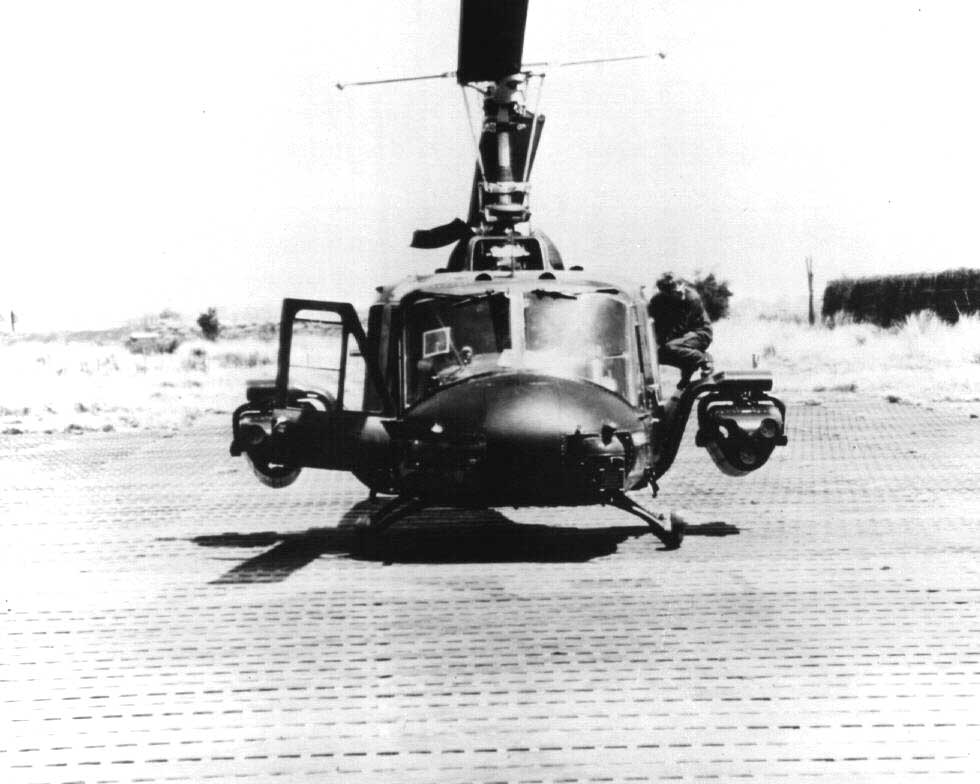
In 1972, two experimental TOW-firing UH-1's killed twenty-four tanks and dozens of other targets over a three week period without receiving a single hit.

The AAFSS contest resulted in a complex design whose development dragged on for years before it was eventually cancelled. Looking for interim design to quickly deploy to Vietnam, the AH-1 Cobra was introduced in combat in 1968.

Between February and April 1971, the US and South Vietnamese Army of the Republic of Vietnam (ARVN) carried out Operation Lam Son 719, the invasion of Laos, in an effort to disrupt the Ho Chi Minh Trail. Over a period of time, the North's People's Army of Vietnam (PAVN) was able to amass a significant counter-invasion force, including extremely strong anti-aircraft forces and massed artillery. As these forces began to push ARVN out of Laos, Fire Base 31 was the subject of a classic armor attack by T-34, T-55, and PT-76 tanks.

This attack was met by rocket-firing Cobras. One post-action report noted that 47 tanks were attacked, and every one responded to the helicopter with its 12.7 mm machine gun, but not one helicopter or crewman was lost. The helicopters destroyed six tanks outright, had nineteen "mobility kills", and a further eight damaged. Seeing this outcome, Army commanders noted that these helicopters had never been designed for anti-tank combat, and "...had we entered Lamson 719 with a helicopter armed with an accurate, lethal, relatively long-range antitank weapon, we would have destroyed many more NVA tanks".

Such a weapon arrived on 24 April 1972, when two experimental BGM-71 TOW-equipped UH-1B Huey were sent to Kon Tum during the Easter Offensive. These were part of a test series taking place in the USA, CDEC 43.6, developing low-altitude flying and attack tactics. The crews of the two aircraft volunteered to continue testing in Vietnam. After shakedown and crew training, they entered combat on 4 May and on their first mission killed four M41 Walker Bulldog tanks, a 2.5 ton truck, and a 105 mm howitzer, all US-supplied equipment that had been captured from ARVN earlier in the campaign. Over the next weeks, the team killed dozens of targets of various sorts as PAVN prepared their forces for an assault on Kon Tum.

The battle opened in earnest on 25 May. The TOWs killed ten T-54s and added another two on the 27th, one of which the crew abandoned un-hit with the engine still running. In another case, a tank crew backed their tank into a house to avoid attack, only to be destroyed by a TOW fired in through a window. By the time the battle ended on 12 June, they had accounted for 24 tanks, 2 APCs, 7 trucks, a twin 23 mm anti-aircraft gun, a 122 mm rocket launcher and many other targets.

The two helicopters remained until 14 October, by which point they had fired 85 TOWs to produce 26 confirmed tank kills, 3 suspected tank kills, 15 wheeled vehicles destroyed, and 33 other point targets hit. This is 77 hits for 85 missiles. During this entire time, neither helicopter received a single hit.

== Canadian interest ==
In 1969, Pierre Trudeau's Cabinet of Canada called into question the Canadian Army's force structure in Europe, which was an expensive contingent to maintain given its low expected lifetime in combat. The existing tank support, based on the Centurion, was obsolete and needed replacement. Wishing to remove the nuclear strike mission as well, the Army was tasked with coming up with a new mission for the European force with a total contingent roughly half that of the existing force.

Considering the options, General Jean Victor Allard proposed a light force focused on anti-tank combat that could be rapidly deployed across Germany in order to stop WTO armored breakouts. The force was equipped mainly with M113s for mobility and armed with TOW and M47 Dragon missiles, as well as six Cobras and a number of to-be-determined Direct Fire Support Vehicles. A series of wargames in March 1970, "Bronze Nimbus", demonstrated the small force would inflict huge casualties on typical WTO formation, but invariably the sheer number of WTO tanks ate up their ammunition and overwhelmed them.

This led the Army to consider becoming a completely airmobile force, adding more attack helicopters to the mix, and using the hunter/killer structure developed in Vietnam. While data from Vietnam was useful, it was not clear how this force would fare in Europe given the WTO's much stronger organic air defenses. Basing the entire future of the Canadian Army's European presence would demand better data and testing if it were to go forward.

== Tests ==
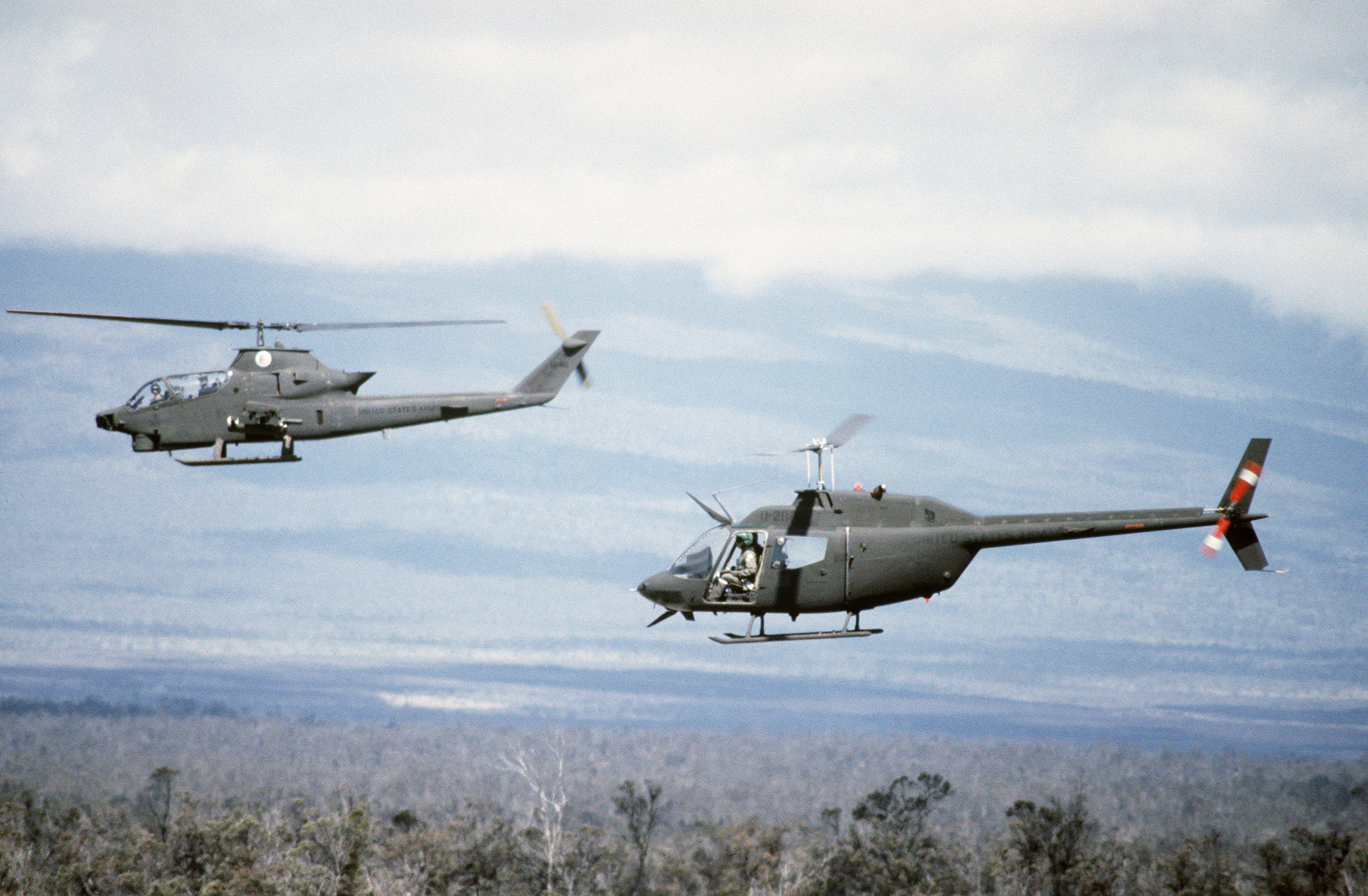
Ansbach demonstrated the value of the "hunter/killer" teams combining the Cobra gunship and Kiowa scout.

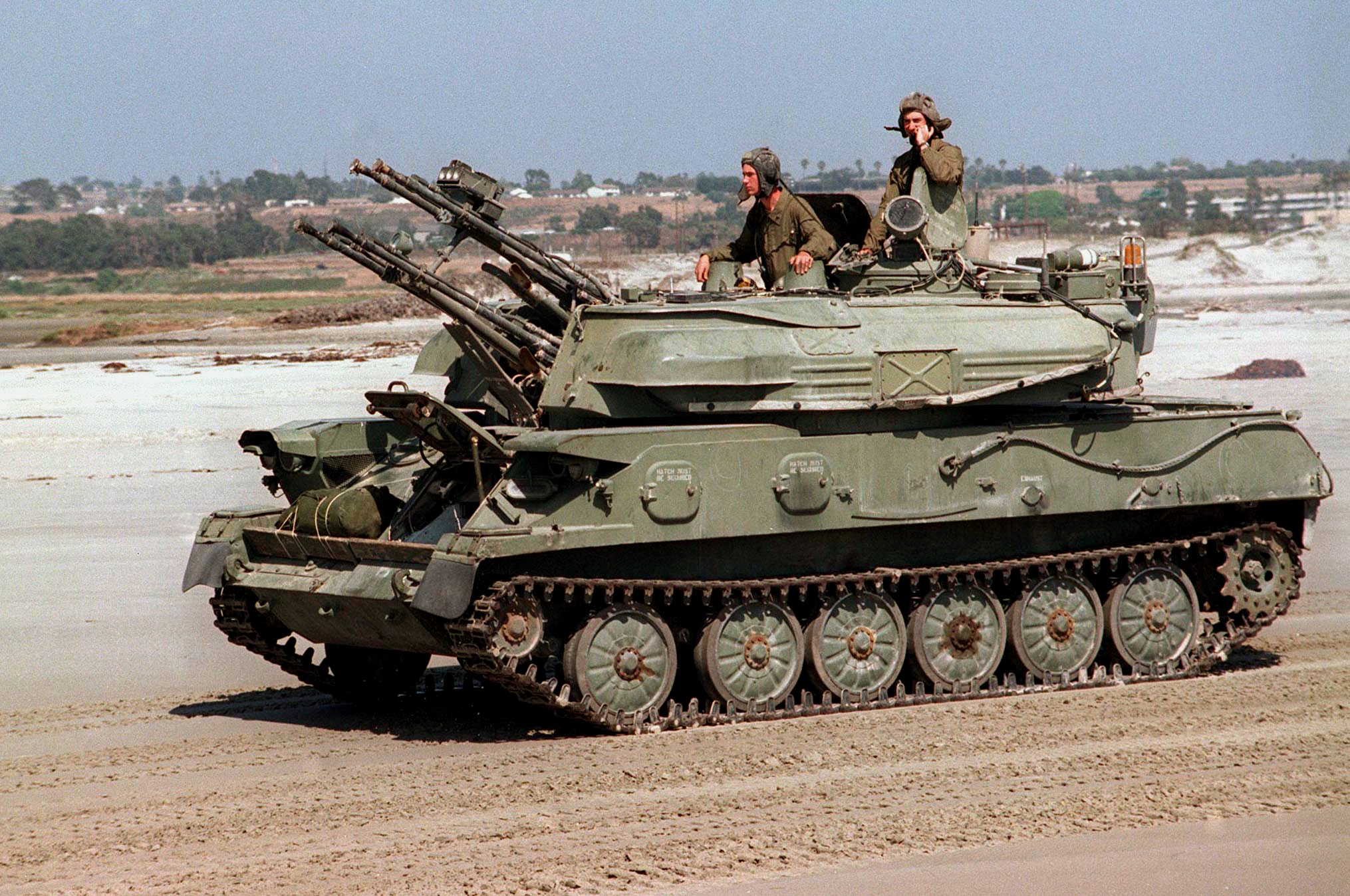
Ansbach suggested the Shilka was easy prey for helicopters using pop-up attacks.

All of these changes resulted in intense interest in helicopter combat in the US, Canada and, increasingly, the German Bundeswehr. The United States Army Europe began forming plans for extensive tests of helicopter combat for early 1972, with German and Canadian participation. The WTO forces would be made up from Bundeswehr Leopard tanks and US M163 VADS playing the part of the ZSU-23-4 Shilka, which had no direct counterpart in NATO. Lasers were used by all vehicles to simulate weapons fire, and laser receivers firing smoke grenades registered hits.

Two types of combat scenarios were considered. In one, a single AH-1G Cobra attack helicopter simulating a TOW-equipped AH-1Q was paired with two OH-58 helicopters providing forward observation. This sort of "hunter/killer" team had been used to great effect in Vietnam. It was not clear this was suitable in an armor-heavy battle expected in Europe, it might be the case that there were so many targets that sending out aircraft with no weapons would reduce the total force effectiveness when those pilots could be in additional Cobras instead. This produced a second set of tests with two Cobras and no Kiowas. Groups of three Leopards with one Vulcan attempted to move forward against this opposition.

Three separate scenarios were trialed. In the first, the helicopters were working in concert with in-place defensive forces, acting as additional anti-tank weapons. In the second, the goal was to delay an attacking force to give time for other forces to get into position to defend against them. In the third, the helicopters were being sent against a successful armored breakthrough with the goal being to kill as many vehicles as possible. A total of 60 trial runs were conducted.

In the breakout scenario, the helicopters benefited from the attacker's lack of information as they moved forward towards the waiting helicopters. The tanks were repeatedly engaged at long range and often had no idea there was a helicopter nearby. The value of the hunter/killer teams, in this case, was clear in the results; when acting alone in this scenario, the attack helicopters often blundered into the tanks and this resulted in the highest losses, six attack helicopters. However, this scenario also resulted in the highest total losses to the attacking force, with 73 vehicles killed, for an exchange ratio of 12 to 1. Over the entire series of runs, the hunter/killer teams killed 67 vehicles for the loss of 6 helicopters for an exchange of 11 to 1, and the all-attack teams killed 127 vehicles for nine losses, a ratio of almost 15 to 1.

The takeaway results of the tests were twofold:

The inclusion of scout helicopters in the antiarmor team is essential and noticeably enhances the survivability of the missile firing aircraft.

and:

Pilots effectively employed nap-of-the-earth flight techniques to conceal their presence and, when they were acquired, usually presented fleeting targets.

Serious questions about the reality of these simulations were raised. Most obvious was the lack of air missions on the Red Force side, which it was suggested would at least restrict the mobility of the helicopters. Additionally, the strong artillery backing normally present could be an effective anti-helicopter weapon, or at least drive them away from good ambush spots. Finally, no reconnaissance forces were present on the Red Force side, which might spot the helicopters before the vehicles approached. Another concern was that the Cobra was only equipped for daytime attacks in good weather, and concerns were raised that European weather would not allow them to operate at the required level.

== Aftermath ==
The most immediate effect of the Ansbach tests was the reopening of the debate about the obsolescence of the tank on the modern battlefield. That the tank was the primary weapon of the anti-tank defense had risen to the point of being official doctrine; FM 17-1 stated that "The tank is the primary armor-defeating weapon of armored formations." Ansbach caused those in support of the helicopter to claim the era of the tank was over, or as one observer put it:

For the advocates of airmobility, the attack helicopter represents the final resolution of the tank-antitank debate. For the protagonists, the attack helicopter represents a pipedream that will be quickly and devastatingly shattered by the reality of combat.

The tests had been carried out just as the new XM-1 tank began its design cycle and was spearheading a renewed interest in tanks. This was bolstered by the events in the Yom Kippur War of 1973, where the Israel Defense Forces (IDF) "utterly defeated combined armies equal in strength to NATO Europe" and suggested that it was "obvious that armor is battlefield-decisive so long as it is used wisely."

== THES ==
Looking to gain further clarity as the debate about the Ansbach results, the US Army commissioned BDM International, now part of Northrop Grumman, to prepare a follow-up theoretical study. The Tactical Helicopter Employment Study, or THES, was largely a literature search, an attempt to find and collect all useful information on the topic of attack helicopters to date. Published in November 1973, THES made three broad conclusions:

1. previous experiments and operations generally supported each other's results
2. doctrines developed during these events appeared to be correct and well accepted
3. the attack helicopter could be used as a primary anti-armor weapon

THES also considered the issue of weather, and using data collected from sixteen sites over a ten-year span, they concluded that the Cobra could fly 91% of the time, even during the worst weather in November and December.

== Outcomes ==
In 1976, as a direct result of the tests and the THES results, the US Army began updating all AH-1G, -1Q and -1R to the modernized AH-1S. The -1S retained the Cobra's direct-fire capabilities with rockets and guns, but shifted its primary mission to anti-tank, carrying eight TOW missiles. In March 1978, a further 100 new-build AH-1S's were ordered.

In Canada, the tests were used to bolster arguments for the new mobile force structure. However, when the cost of the helicopters was considered, it appeared there was only enough money to equip one formation with the required number of aircraft. This would leave the forces in Canada both under-equipped and unable to perform realistic training. Having repeatedly suggested a status quo approach, updating the Centurions in both Europe and Canada, a wait and see approach developed. An additional factor in the Canadian decision was the advocacy of Major Norman Shackleton, who wrote a series of influential and widely quoted pro-tank articles throughout this period. Among these was a 1967 article that concluded: "... the foremost antitank weapon is probably another tank sited in the defense." By the early 1980s, the helicopter contingent had not been purchased, while a new tank contingent of Leopards had been purchased from Germany in 1978.

Other NATO forces also began the process of integrating attack helicopters into their forces, initially with ad hoc conversions of existing utility designs like the Westland Scout and MBB Bo 105.

== See also ==
- J-CATCH, testing attack helicopters against fighter aircraft
