= Exercise Hell Tank =

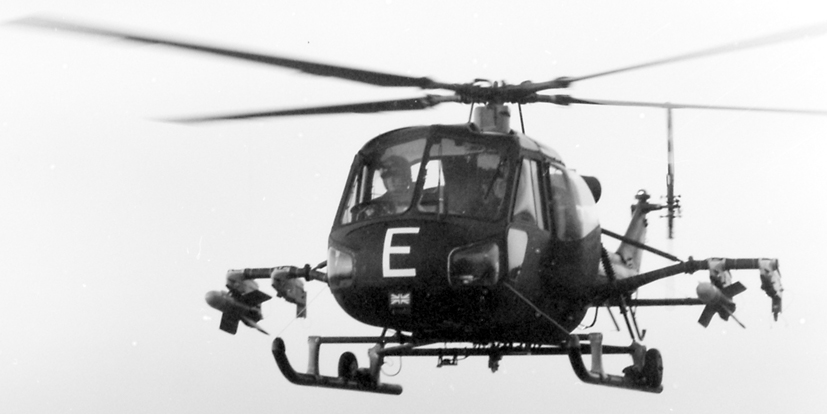
The Westland Scout armed with SS.11 missiles proved to be a deadly weapon against tanks during Exercise Hell Tank.

Exercise Hell Tank (sometimes Helltank) was a series of military exercises carried out by the British Army of the Rhine (BAOR) in 1966 and 1967 to study the use of the helicopter in the anti-tank role. A follow-up test in 1969, Exercise Sparrow Hawk, demonstrated helicopters could avoid fixed-wing aircraft.

Helicopter forces consisted of Westland Scout and Aérospatiale Alouette II firing the SS.11 wire-guided anti-tank missile, supported by BAOR infantry units acting in defence. "Enemy" ground forces were BAOR tanks and infantry, equipped with the Blowpipe and Rapier surface-to-air missiles (SAMs), both of which were still under development at that time. This led to some criticism of the tests, as they could not truly be sure how well the production versions would work.

The conclusions were simple. When the tanks were on the move, the helicopter was devastatingly effective at killing them; one participant calculated it was 45-to-0 in favour of the helicopters. When the tanks were in a defensive position with their engines turned off, they were very difficult to spot and the helicopters often flew into range of their machine guns without noticing them, while the tank crews could hear the helicopters approaching long before they came into range.

The tests were influential in Europe, but did not have a significant effect on US Army operations in spite of strong support for the air cavalry concept at the time. It was not until the US, along with Germany and Canada, carried out the similar Ansbach tests in 1972 that the idea of the anti-tank helicopter as a primary anti-tank system became cemented across NATO.

== History ==
=== Early helicopter use in the UK ===
Early helicopters had limited performance, especially in terms of cargo capacity, which led to them being considered suitable for roles similar to those of the earlier liaison aircraft, that is, clandestine operations inserting operatives, light supply and shuttle duties, casualty evacuation, and especially battlefield reconnaissance. All of these roles saw helicopter take-up by both the Army Air Corps and Royal Air Force (RAF) where appropriate.

Thinking changed dramatically in 1959 with the French test of an Aérospatiale Alouette II firing the SS.10 anti-tank missile. While there were significant problems with both the Alouette II in terms of capacity and the SS.10 in terms of range, solutions to both were already in development and would be arriving shortly. This led to interest by the AAC as a possible combat system.

In 1960, General Gerald Hopkinson, Director of the Royal Armoured Corps (RAC), had the Army Air Corps produce a report under the direction of Lieutenant-Colonel W. J. Hotblack on the topic. The report noted that the system seemed quite interesting, but that the helicopters may be vulnerable to the tank's main gun when they were hovering. They also suggested that all tanks would need their secondary AA weapons to be upgraded to counter this new threat.

The result was some in-fighting between the AAC and the RAC. One senior AAC officer was quoted as saying "Wouldn't you like to trade a Scout helicopter armed with SS.11 missiles instead of a Chieftain? After all, they each cost about the same".

=== First Hell Tank ===
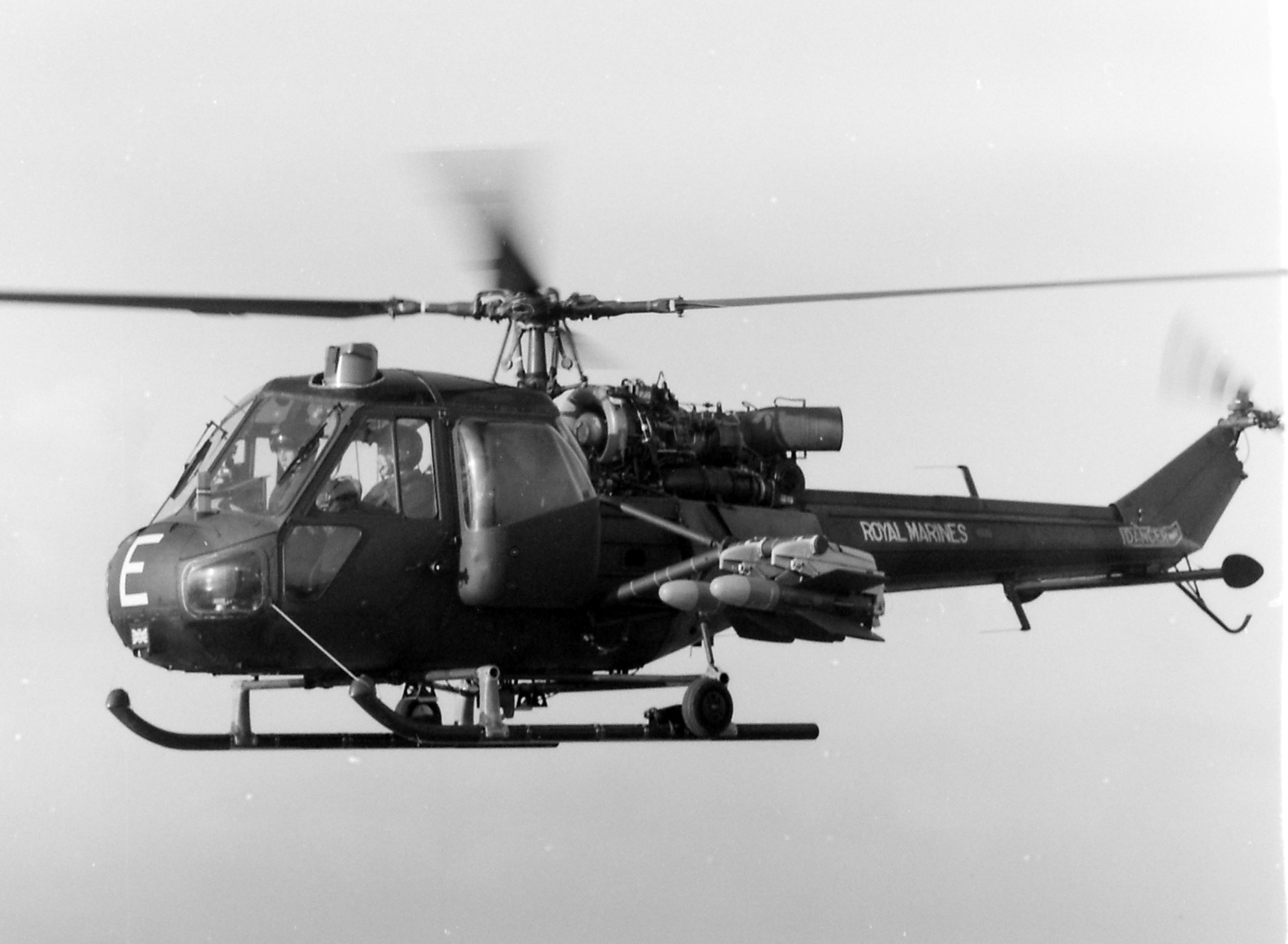
For the first Hell Tank experiments, the Scout carried four SS.11 missiles and used a stabilized sight that projected through the roof of the cabin.

While the early reports were entirely theoretical, testing them could not occur until the AAC had sufficient helicopters and tanks to trial the various concepts. In the summer of 1966, the Ministry of Defense called for a trial called "Hell Tank" with three broad phases: in Phase I, the tests were intended to gauge the helicopter's ability to find tanks on the field as perform more general information gathering; Phase II would test the helicopter's ability to survive attacks by the tanks; and Phase III would be a series of a dozen tests at combat team size with Westland Scout's armed with the newer SS.11, standing in for the Swingfire missile whose performance would have to be extrapolated.

There was an understanding from the start that any conclusions drawn solely from helicopter-vs-tank could be misleading. It ignored the effects of enemy aircraft or those of short-range surface-to-air missiles (SAMs) like Blowpipe and Rapier, both of which were projected to enter service in the near future. These might make helicopter operations too dangerous to use on the actual battlefield. There was also the concern that the real performance of the Swingfire, Blowpipe and Rapier might not match what was extrapolated from the tests.

The tests were carried out later that year on Salisbury Plain around Tilshead and Imbur, the same ground where pioneering tests of tank combat had been carried out in the 1920s and 30s. The significance was not lost on the observers, especially Collins, who was concerned that the results might be seen as extremely important in the future and would be attached to his name. The tests were carried out with numerous observers and considerable recording including movie film for later interpretation.

The results were much as had been expected. Phase I demonstrated that the helicopters had a relatively easy time finding the tanks even at long range if they were moving, but often did not see them if they were emplaced and not running their engine. In that case they generally did not see the tank until they flew into range of the tank's machine guns. Phase II demonstrated that if the helicopter continued to move about the battlefield it had a very good chance of surviving the fight, although the idea that helicopters would be unseen was abandoned as the rapid movement and large amounts of noise led to them being detected by the tanks in almost every case. Phase III, using SS.11 missiles and the APX stabilized gunsight of French design, suggested that actually hitting the tanks in combat would not be difficult, although there was some over-claiming in these results as near-missiles were considered kills.

=== Hell Tank IV ===
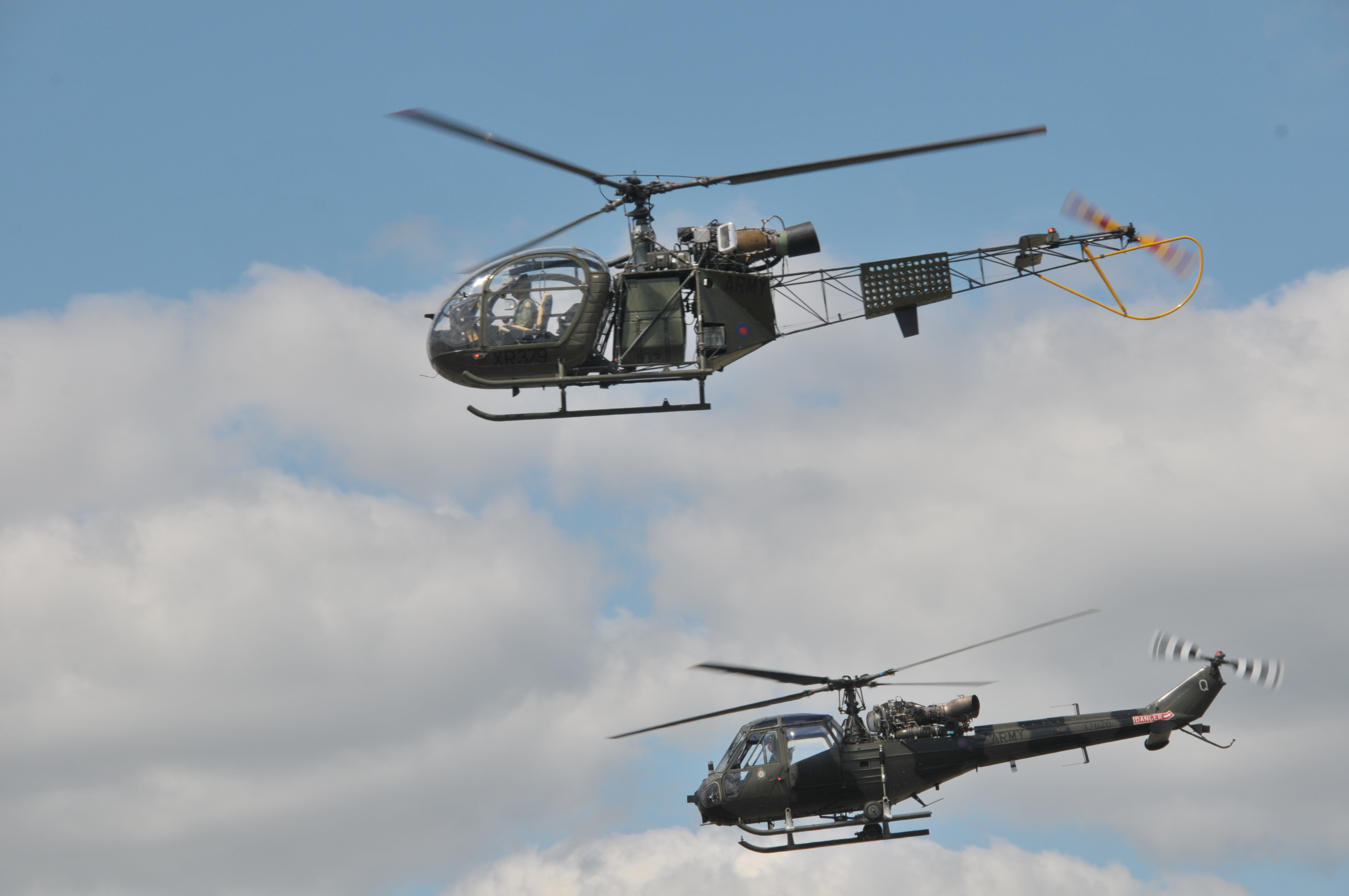
During Phase IV, the Alouette II and Scout were put on opposite sides to make identification easier.

Another of the outcomes was the realization that Phase III had simply not been detailed enough to draw accurate conclusions, and the limited area of movement on Salisbury was far less than desired. As a result, planning began for a Hell Tank Phase IV, which would take place during planned operations in Germany the next year.

Phase IV was carried out in October 1967 to the north of Uelzen in northern Germany, nearer to the East German border than most such exercises. The operations took place over a four-day period with units up to battalion size, based on an assault by Redland into Blueland starting on the morning of 13 October. Blueland was equipped with the Chieftain in its first major outing and versions of the Alouette II with open-framework tailbooms, and Redland with the Centurion and Scouts with solid tails. The use of two different helicopters was intended to aid visual identification. Both ground forces were also equipped with FV432s, some equipped with a piece of pipe that they were instructed to operate as it if were a 30 mm cannon. Some of the infantry were allocated to virtual Blowpipe, and some of the Royal Artillery to virtual Rapier units.

The operations opened on a high note when the 2nd Royal Tank Regiment managed to take the opposing headquarters within the first few minutes of the operation beginning. From then on things went much more smoothly, which was aided by using different vehicles on each side. The exercise as a whole simulated Blueland retreating under attack with the helicopters providing cover, until the last day, which would end with a simulated nuclear weapon strike by Blueland followed by a counterattack. This event ended with the helicopters unable to participate due to fog, which highlighted their major disadvantage, only being able to fly in good weather.

=== Outcome ===
The results of Phase IV were eye-opening. One participant suggested that the helicopters had a 45-to-0 kill ratio over the Redland tanks when the tanks were attempting to move forward. When in defensive positions, the balance swung strongly in favour of the tank, as the Blueland tank crews could hear the helicopters approaching and engage them with their weapons. In conclusion, there was no doubt that the helicopter would have a place on the future battlefield, although it would have to, like any new weapon system, be property integrated into the overall force structure.

Likewise, it was also clear that infantry would have to be given adequate SAM weapons, as these appeared to be the simplest way to deal with enemy helicopters. As the infantry proved to be essentially invisible from the air, the helicopters often overflew them, making them easy targets if a suitable weapon was available. There was some criticism of the tests due to the use of Blowpipe and Rapier as "notional weapons systems" given they had not entered service, but this was not considered a serious limitation to interpreting the results.

== Future tests ==
A more serious issue was the question of whether or not helicopters would be able to operate when opposing aircraft were in the air. This led to the 1969 Exercise Sparrow Hawk to test this question, which concluded helicopters could evade fixed-wing aircraft.

While Hell Tank was mentioned in many military reports and magazines of the era, it had little effect within the US Army in spite of them actively developing the air cavalry concept and having noted a significant issue with fire support in the Vietnam War. Experimental systems, notably TOW-firing UH-1 Huey helicopters were not trialled until the Easter Offensive, where they demonstrated outcomes similar to Hell Tank, with many tanks and vehicles destroyed for no losses. As a result of these successes, in the spring of 1972 the US, German and Canadian armies ran the Joint Attack Helicopter Instrumented Evaluation in Germany, which had results not unlike those of Hell Tank. Later comments noted that money could have been saved had the tests been coordinated.

In 1976, as a direct result of the tests and later analysis, the US Army began updating all of their AH-1G, -1Q and -1R to the modernized AH-1S. The -1S retained the Cobra's direct-fire capabilities with rockets and guns, but shifted its primary mission to anti-tank, carrying eight TOW missiles. In March 1978, a further 100 new-build AH-1S's were ordered. Other NATO forces also began the process of integrating attack helicopters into their forces, initially with ad hoc conversions of existing utility designs like the Scout and MBB Bo 105.
