= J-CATCH =

1978/79 US military experiment in air combat between jet fighters and attack helicopters

J-CATCH, short for Joint Countering Attack Helicopter, was a joint US Army-US Air Force experiment in dissimilar air combat between jet fighters and attack helicopters, conducted in 1978/79. To the surprise of many involved in the program, the helicopters proved extremely dangerous to the fighters when they were properly employed, racking up a 5-to-1 kill ratio over the fighters when fighting at close ranges with guns.

The tests were a response to the introduction of the Mil Mi-24 "Hind" helicopter in Warsaw Pact (WTO) forces. In earlier tests, like Ansbach, anti-tank helicopters proved to be potent weapons and much of NATOs 1970s strategy was based on using helicopters to blunt a WTO attack. If the Soviets introduced their own helicopters, NATO might be at a disadvantage once again.

Previously, NATO had relied on having almost complete air supremacy during a war, so the obvious answer to the Hind problem was to shoot them down. J-CATCH was organized to provide doctrine to fighter pilots on how to best accomplish this task. Given the surprising results in close-range combat, the main lesson was that helicopters should only be engaged at long range using look-down weapons like the AIM-7 and AIM-9.

== Background ==
Prior to J-CATCH, there had been little effort in the US to explore fighter-helicopter tactics. One of the earliest involved MASH Sikorsky H-19's, which the Army believed would be easy targets for enemy fighters. Many years later, in 1971, the new Combat Development Evaluation Center conducted an experiment with Army Bell AH-1 Cobras vs. US Navy F-4 Phantoms. The latter demonstrated that the Cobra was a fleeting target when employed over land, but worried about the Navy, whose search and rescue helicopters operated over water with no cover available.

By the 1970s, it was clear that the Soviets were dramatically increasing their own helicopter force. The urgency of this threat grew as the west learned of the capabilities of the Hind and later, the 9K114 Shturm (AT-6 Spiral) anti-tank missile. The platform represented a serious threat to NATO armor. The results of earlier experiments and the lack of modern organic air-defense units in the Army suggested that the Hind would run rampant over the battlefield.

== J-CATCH ==
Starting in 1978, the situation was addressed with the organization of the J-CATCH program.

=== Phase I ===
Phase I started with simulator efforts in the Differential Maneuvering Simulator (DMS) at NASA Langley in May 1978. The DMS was developed to simulate two spacecraft or aircraft maneuvering together, and was a natural fit for simulating one-on-one encounters between helicopters and other aircraft. Aircrew from the Army, Marines, Military Airlift Command and the Tactical Air Command participated in the tests, which involved the simulation of both armed and unarmed helicopters.

=== Phase II ===
Experience from the simulator tests led to a series of field studies in Phase II, studying helicopter vs. helicopter tactics, a field that had never been officially studied before. The tests took place at Fort Rucker, Alabama. Blue Force, representing a US Army anti-armor group, was taken from forces based at Fort Rucker, including three AH-1 Cobras and two OH-58 Scouts.

Selecting a force to represent Red Team was not so easy. The Hind was a large aircraft with high speed and relatively low maneuverability, like the CH-3E Sea King, but heavily armed with a two-man crew, like the Cobra. This role was filled by the 20th Special Operations Squadron, 1st Special Operations Wing at Hurlburt Field in Florida. The 20th's primary mission was infiltration/exfiltration of special operations units, and were equipped (at the time) with the Bell UH-1N Twin Huey and CH-3E Sea King.

CIA intelligence officers who had some knowledge of the Hind were called in to brief the 20th's pilots on what little was known of the new aircraft and its tactics. The Hind was, in some respects, a combination of these two aircraft, so they were used in concert in an attempt to simulate it. In order to provide a reasonable gun system, a number of Emerson Mini-TAT turrets were loaned by the Canadian Forces, who used the system on their own UH-1Ns.

These missions developed a number of new helicopter air-to-air maneuvering (HAAM) techniques, which had not been considered before J-CATCH. Helicopters proved to be every bit as capable of air combat as their fixed-wing brethren, at least when operating against other helicopters.

=== Phase III ===
To answer the question of whether or not the same was true in helicopter-vs-fighter encounters, a selection of F-4, A-7, A-10 and F-15 aircraft were selected by the Air Force to take part in the tests. The F-4 and F-15 represented front-line fighters who might be ordered to deal with helicopters as part of their anti-air roles, while the A-7 and A-10 represented ground-attack aircraft who might encounter helicopters as part of their missions near the front lines.

During the two-week exercise, the helicopters proved devastating to the fixed-wing aircraft. In most cases, the fighter pilots had no idea they were being "attacked" until they returned to base for debriefing. This led to a series of claims and counter-claims. So, for the second week, the helicopter pilots were instructed to follow Air Force procedure and call out "guns-guns-guns" when "firing". The kill ratio in favour of the helicopters climbed even higher during this period. Over the entire two-week period, the outcome was a 5-to-1 ratio in favour of the helicopters.

As the exercise continued, the 20th increasingly took on the role of the Soviet pilots. The maintenance crews hung a red tablecloth on a pole and mounted it to the back of their truck, and then added red scarves made of cut up rags. Aircrew took up this bit of flair, which has remained part of the uniform of the 20th to this day. A red star was added as a mission patch.

=== Phase IV and on ===
The surprising outcome of Phase III was not ignored. In Phase IV through VI of the project, during 1979, the lessons learned in Phase II and III were digested and fed back to the aircrews through new combat doctrine.

The official report details how the F-15 was able to lock on to the helicopters from around 64 km. However, it did not get visual ID until 6-9 km. (Beyond-visual range combat wasn't practiced at this exercise.) When AIM-7 Sparrows were employed for the F-15, it stacked a 2.9-1 kill ratio on the helicopters. F-4s with 20 mm cannons were less fortunate, stacking up a 0.7-1 kill ratio. The A-10 did slightly better with its 30 mm gun stacking up a 1.3-1 kill ratio.

Due to their maneuverability, helicopters are very dangerous opponents when matched against fixed winged aircraft. To this day, the basic lesson is that fighters should stay away from helicopters, and only attack from high altitudes or at long ranges (beyond visual range with missiles) and only if the situation presents itself.

== Helicopter hunters ==
The introduction of newer attack helicopters and the expected proliferation of existing types led to a number of design studies for aircraft that would be able to protect a wide area of the front from these attacks. In particular, in 1981, the Army started the Low Cost Battlefield Attack Aircraft project and eventually built the Scaled Composites ARES to test these concepts. In the UK, British Aerospace started a similar project called Small Agile Battlefield Aircraft.

== See also ==
- Joint Attack Helicopter Instrumented Evaluation, helicopter versus tank tests that led to widespread helicopter use in Europe
