= Attack helicopter =

Ground-attack military helicopter

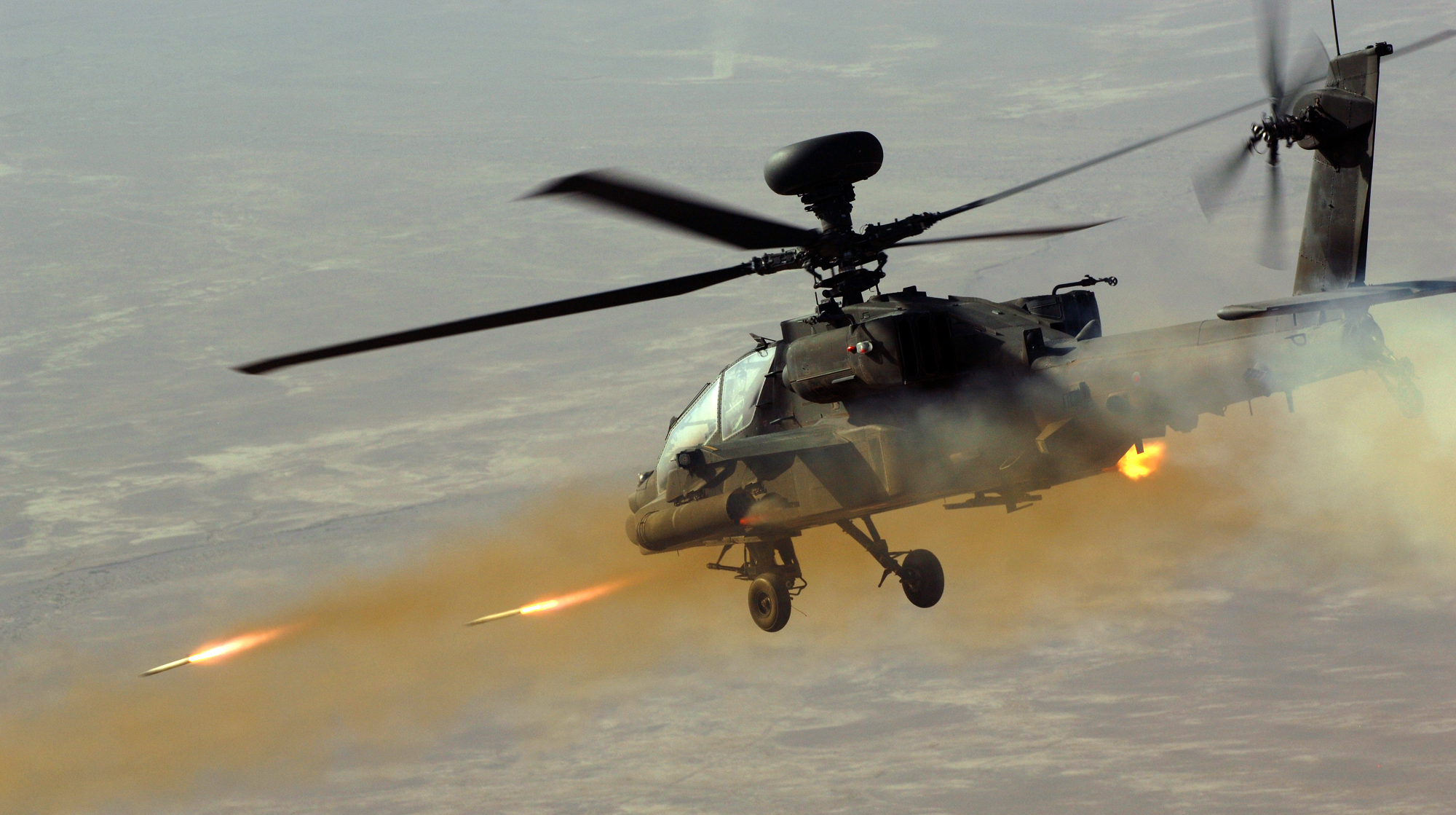
A British AgustaWestland Apache helicopter fires rockets at enemy insurgents in Afghanistan, June 2008.

An attack helicopter is an armed helicopter with the primary role of an attack aircraft, with the offensive capability of engaging ground targets such as enemy infantry, military vehicles, and fortifications. Due to their heavy armament, they are sometimes called helicopter gunships.

Attack helicopters can use weapons including autocannons, machine guns, rockets, and anti-tank missiles such as the AGM-114 Hellfire. Some attack helicopters are also capable of carrying air-to-air missiles, though mostly for purposes of self-defense against other helicopters and low-flying light combat aircraft.

A modern attack helicopter has two primary roles: first, to provide direct and accurate close air support for ground troops; and second, the anti-tank role to destroy grouped enemy armored vehicles. Attack helicopters are also used as protective escort for transport helicopters, or to supplement lighter helicopters in the armed reconnaissance roles. In combat, an attack helicopter is projected to destroy targets worth around 17 times its own production cost before being destroyed.

== Development ==
=== Background ===
Low-speed, fixed wing Allied aircraft like the Soviet Polikarpov Po-2 training and utility biplane had been used as early as 1942 to provide night harassment attack capability against the Wehrmacht Heer on the Eastern Front, most effectively in the Battle of the Caucasus as exemplified by the Night Witches all-female Soviet air unit. Following Operation Overlord in 1944, the military version of the similarly slow-flying Piper J-3 Cub high-wing civilian monoplane, the L-4 Grasshopper, begun to be used in a light anti-armor role by a few U.S. Army artillery spotter units over France; these aircraft were field-outfitted with either two or four bazooka rocket launchers attached to the lift struts, against German armored fighting vehicles. During the summer of 1944, U.S. Army Major Charles Carpenter managed to successfully take on an anti-armor role with his rocket-armed Piper L-4. His L-4, bearing US Army serial number 43-30426 and named Rosie the Rocketer, armed with six bazookas, had notable success in an engagement during the Battle of Arracourt on September 20, 1944, employing top attack tactics in knocking out at least four German armored vehicles, as a pioneering example of taking on heavy enemy armor from a slow-flying aircraft.

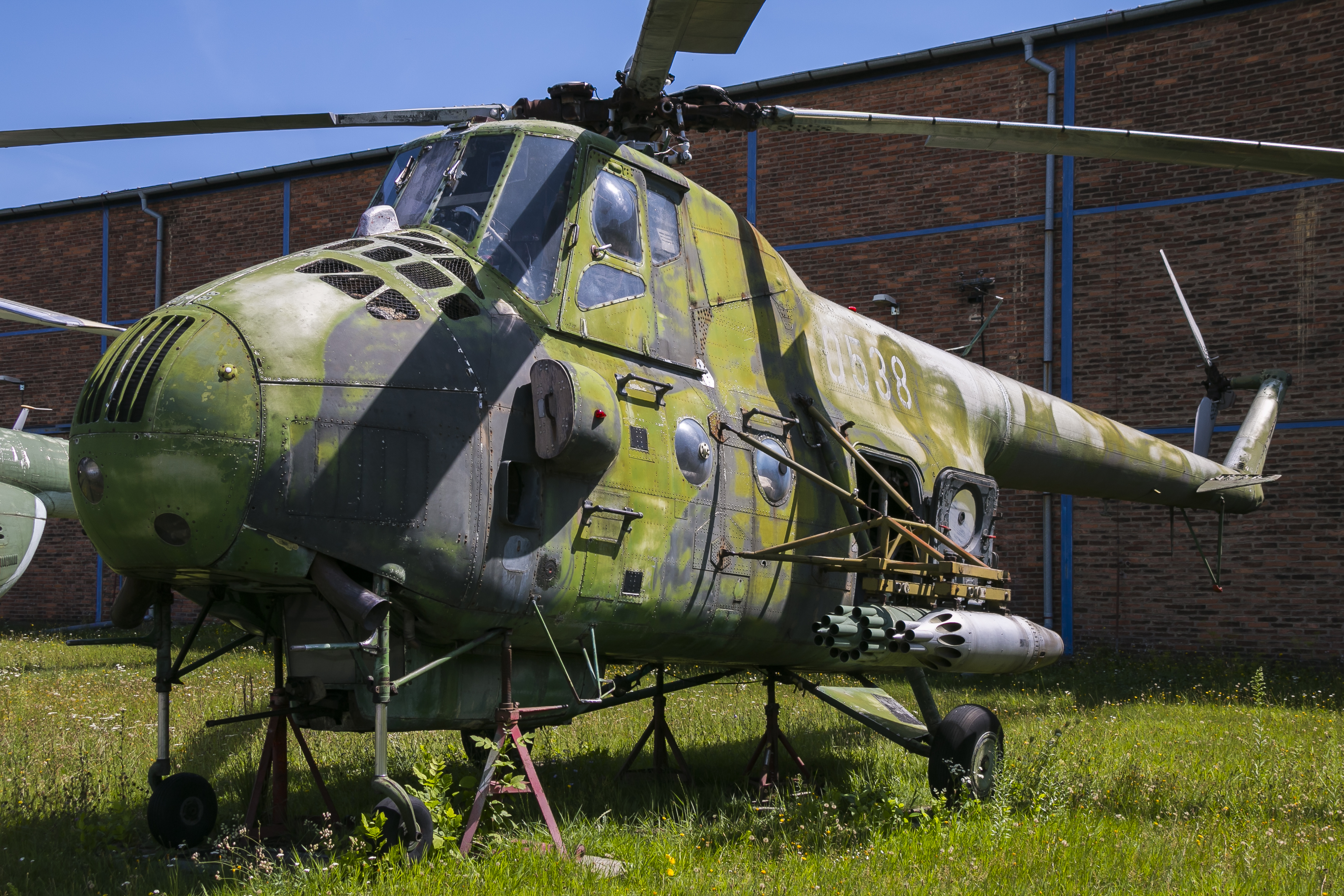
Designed as a transport helicopter, the Mil Mi-4 was in some cases armed as with the Mi-4MU variant.

The Germans were also engaged in such ad hoc low-speed light aircraft platforms for ground attack very late in the war, with one subtype of the Bücker Bestmann trainer—the Bü 181C-3—armed with four Panzerfaust 100 anti-tank grenade launchers, two under each of the low-winged monoplane's wing panels, for the concluding two months of the war in Europe. This sort of role, being undertaken by low-speed fixed-wing light aircraft, was also likely to be achievable after World War II, from the increasing numbers of post-war military helicopter designs. The only American helicopter in use during the war years, the Sikorsky R-4, was used only for rescue and remained very much experimental.

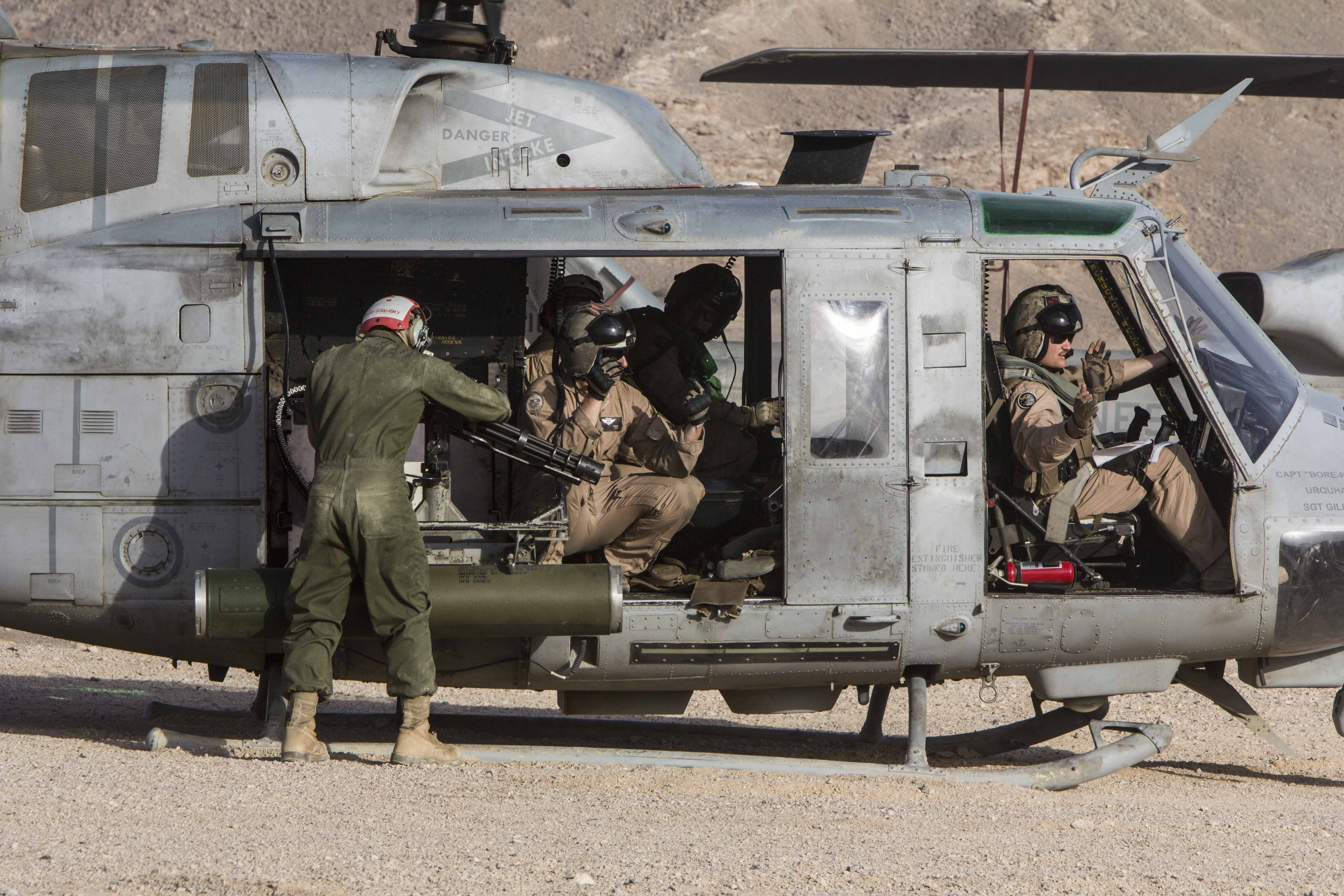
UH-1N armed with minigun and rocket pods

In the early 1950s, various countries around the world began to make greater use of helicopters in transport and liaison roles. Later on, it was realized that these helicopters, successors to the World War II-era Sikorsky R-4, could be armed to provide them with limited combat capability. Early examples include armed Sikorsky H-34s in service with the US Air Force and armed Mil Mi-4 in service with the Soviet Air Forces. This "experimental" trend towards the development of dedicated attack helicopters continued into the 1960s with the deployment of armed Bell UH-1s and Mil Mi-8s during the Vietnam War, to this day the pair of most produced helicopter designs in aviation history. Bell Helicopter employee and Vietnam War veteran Billy "Bill" Frank Perkins, though less well known, was the first person ever to fly an attack helicopter; he possesses an official certificate to that effect. These helicopters proved to be moderately successful in these configurations. Still, due to a lack of armor protection and speed, they were ultimately ineffective platforms for mounting weapons in higher-threat ground combat environments.

Since the 1960s, countries around the world have begun designing and developing helicopters to provide heavily armed, protected aerial vehicles capable of performing a variety of combat roles, from reconnaissance to aerial assault. By the 1990s, the missile-armed attack helicopter evolved into a primary anti-tank weapon. Able to quickly move about the battlefield and launch fleeting "pop-up attacks", helicopters presented a major threat even with the presence of organic air defenses. The helicopter gunship became a major tool against tank warfare, and most attack helicopters were increasingly optimized for the anti-tank mission.

=== United States ===
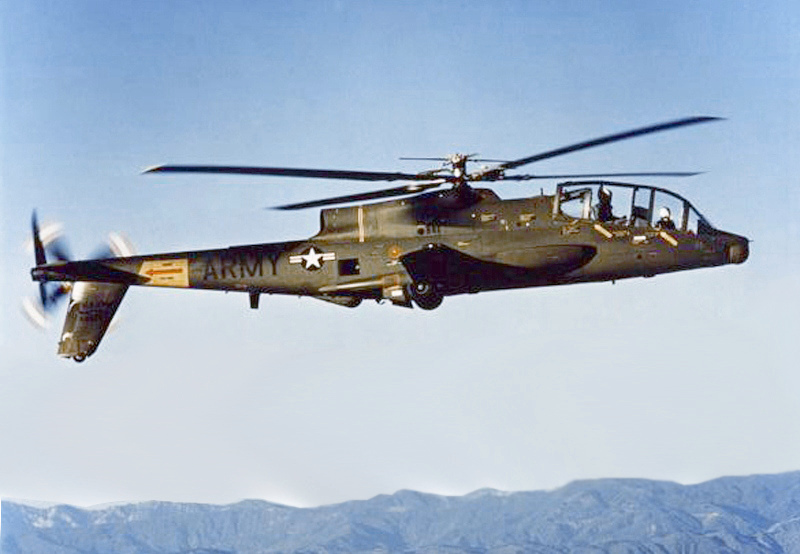
AH-56 Cheyenne prototype

In the opening months of the Korean War, in August 1950, a joint US Navy and Marine Corps test used a newly acquired Bell HTL-4 helicopter to determine whether a bazooka could be fired from a helicopter in flight. One of the larger 3.5-inch (90mm caliber) bazooka models was chosen and mounted ahead and to the right of the helicopter to keep the door clear. The bazooka was successfully tested, although it was discovered that it would require shielding for the engine compartment, which was exposed in the model 47 and other early helicopters. The helicopter itself belonged to HMX-1, a Marine experimental helicopter squadron.

In the mid-1960s, the U.S. Army concluded that a purpose-built attack helicopter with more speed and firepower than current armed helicopters was required in the face of increasingly intense ground fire (often using heavy machine guns and anti-tank rockets) from Viet Cong and NVA troops. Based on this realization and the growing involvement in Vietnam, the U.S. Army developed requirements for a dedicated attack helicopter, the Advanced Aerial Fire Support System (AAFSS). The aircraft design selected for this program in 1965, was Lockheed's AH-56 Cheyenne.

As the Army began acquiring a dedicated attack helicopter, it sought options to improve performance compared with the continued use of improvised interim aircraft (such as the UH-1B/C). In late 1965, a panel of high-level officers was selected to evaluate several prototype armed attack helicopters to determine which offered the greatest increase in capability over the UH-1B. The three highest-ranked aircraft, the Sikorsky S-61, Kaman H-2 "Tomahawk", and the Bell AH-1 Cobra, were selected to compete in flight trials conducted by the Army's Aviation Test Activity. Upon completion of the flight evaluations, the Test Activity recommended Bell's Huey Cobra to be an interim armed helicopter until the Cheyenne was fielded. On 13 April 1966, the U.S. Army awarded Bell Helicopter Company a production contract for 110 AH-1G Cobras. The Cobra had a tandem cockpit seating arrangement (vs UH-1 side-by-side) to make the aircraft a smaller frontal target, increased armor protection, and greater speed.

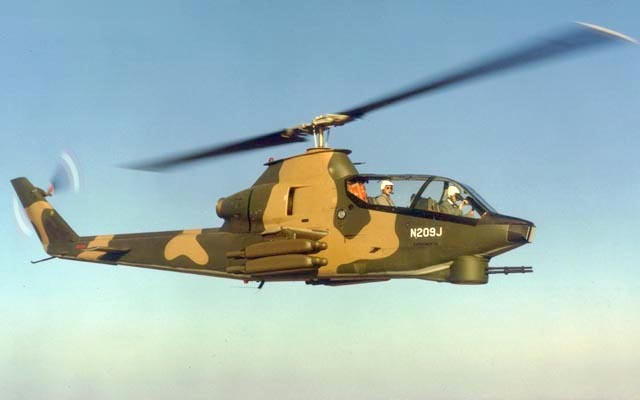
Prototype of the AH-1, the first dedicated attack helicopter, and a canonical example to this day

In 1967, the first AH-1Gs were deployed to Vietnam, around the same time that the Cheyenne completed its first flight and initial flight evaluations. And while the Cheyenne program suffered setbacks over the next few years due to technical problems, the Cobra was establishing itself as an effective aerial weapons platform, despite its performance shortcomings compared to the AH-56 and its own design issues. The cost estimates of the AH-56 increased substantially. By 1972, when the Cheyenne program was eventually cancelled to make way for the Advanced Attack Helicopter (AAH), the interim AH-1 "Snake" had built a solid reputation as an attack helicopter. In June 1972, the USMC began deploying AH-1J SeaCobra Attack Helicopters for combat operations in South Vietnam.

In the late 1970s, the U.S. Army recognized the need for greater sophistication in the attack helicopter corps to enable them to operate in all weather conditions. Although AH-1Gs served well, they proved vulnerable even in a mid-intensity environment. With that the Advanced Attack Helicopter (AAH) program started, aiming for a more durable, more advanced, longer range, stronger close air support helicopter, capable of destroying armored formations. It would be capable of carrying the new AGM-114 Hellfire and night fighting capabilities. From this program the Hughes YAH-64 came out as the winner. The prototype YAH-64 was first flown on 30 September 1975. The U.S. Army selected the YAH-64 over the Bell YAH-63 in 1976, and later approved full production in 1982. After purchasing Hughes Helicopters in 1984, McDonnell Douglas continued to produce and develop the AH-64 Apache. The helicopter was introduced to U.S. Army service in April 1986.

Today, the US attack helicopter has been further refined, and the AH-64D Apache Longbow demonstrates many of the advanced technologies being considered for deployment on future gunships. The US Marine Corps also continued to employ attack helicopters in a direct fire-support role, specifically the AH-1 Super Cobra. While helicopters were effective tank-killers in the Middle East, attack helicopters are being seen more in a multipurpose role. Tactics such as tank plinking demonstrated that fixed-wing aircraft could be effective against tanks, but helicopters retained a unique low-altitude, low-speed capability for close air support. Other purpose-built helicopters were developed for special operations missions, including the MH-6 for extremely close support.

=== Soviet Union and its successor states ===
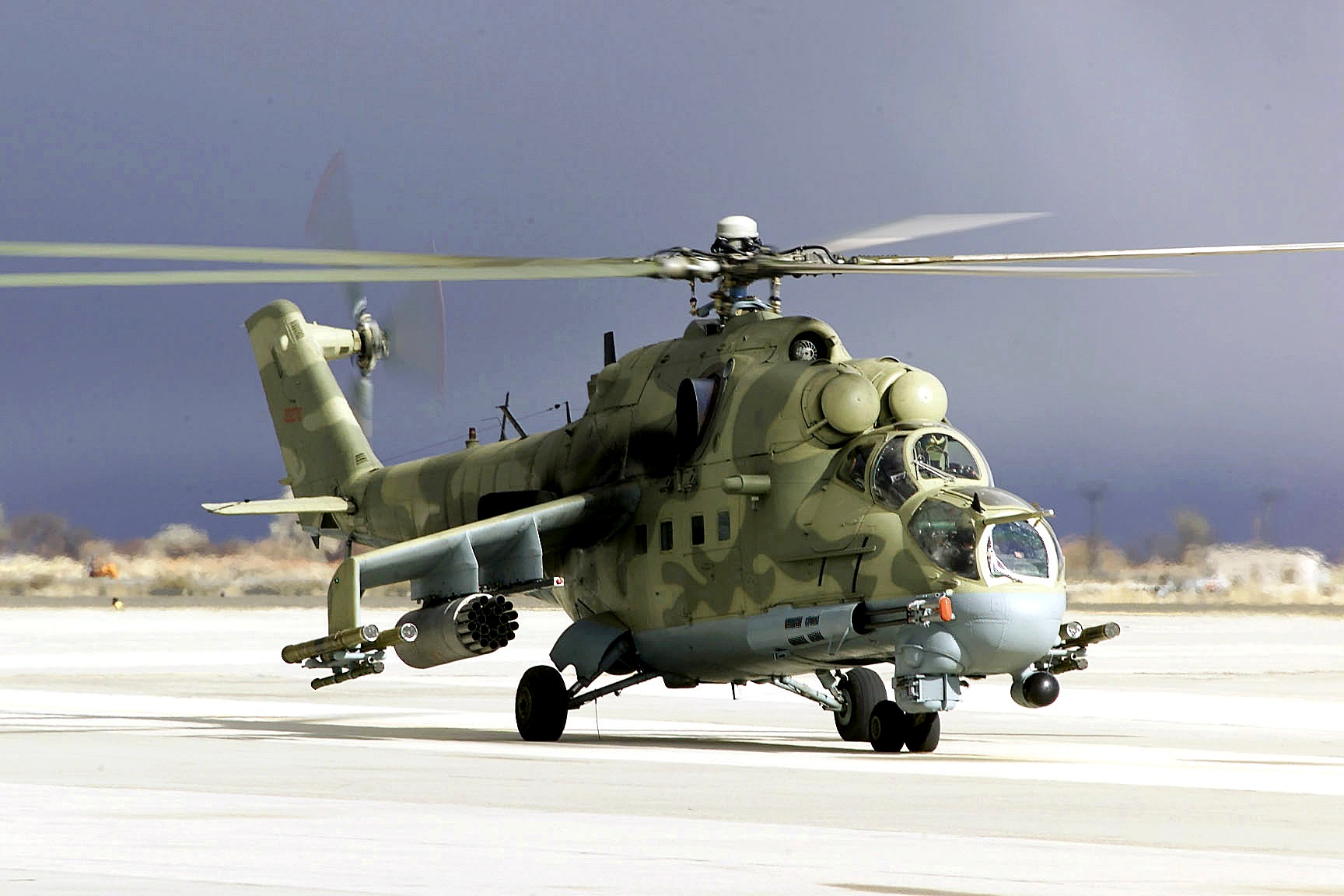
Mil Mi-24P, a later production variant of the Mi-24. These helicopters were used extensively in the Soviet–Afghan War.

During the early 1960s, Soviet engineers began experimenting with various designs to produce an aerial vehicle capable of providing battlefield mobility for infantry and fire support to ground forces. The first of these concepts was a mock-up unveiled in 1966 in the experimental shop of the Ministry of Aircraft's factory number 329, where Mikhail Leont'yevich Mil was head designer. The mock-up, designated V-24, was based on another project, the V-22 utility helicopter, which never entered production. The V-24 had an infantry transport compartment that could hold eight troops sitting back to back, and a set of small wings positioned to the top rear of the passenger cabin, capable of holding up to six missiles or rocket pods, along with a twin-barrel GSh-23L cannon fixed to the landing skid.

Mil proposed these designs to the Soviet armed forces. While he had the support of several strategists, he was opposed by several more senior members of the armed forces who believed that conventional weapons were a better use of resources. Despite opposition, Mil managed to persuade the defense minister's first deputy, Marshal Andrey A. Grechko, to convene an expert panel to investigate the matter. While the panel's opinions were mixed, supporters of the project eventually held sway, and a request for design proposals for a battlefield support helicopter was issued.

The development of gunships and attack helicopters by the US Army during the Vietnam War convinced the Soviets of the advantages of armed helicopter ground-support doctrine, which helped move forward the development of the Mil Mi-24. After several mock-ups were produced, a directive was issued on 6 May 1968 to proceed with the development of a twin-engine helicopter design. Work proceeded under Mil until his death in 1970. Detailed design work began in August 1968 under the codename Yellow 24. A full-scale mock-up of the design was reviewed and approved in February 1969. Flight tests with a prototype began on 15 September 1969 with a tethered hover, and four days later, the first free flight was conducted. A second prototype was built, followed by a test batch of ten helicopters. Some other design changes were made until the production version, the Mi-24A, entered production in 1970, obtained its initial operating capability in 1971, and was officially accepted into the state arsenal in 1972. Numerous versions have been developed to this day.

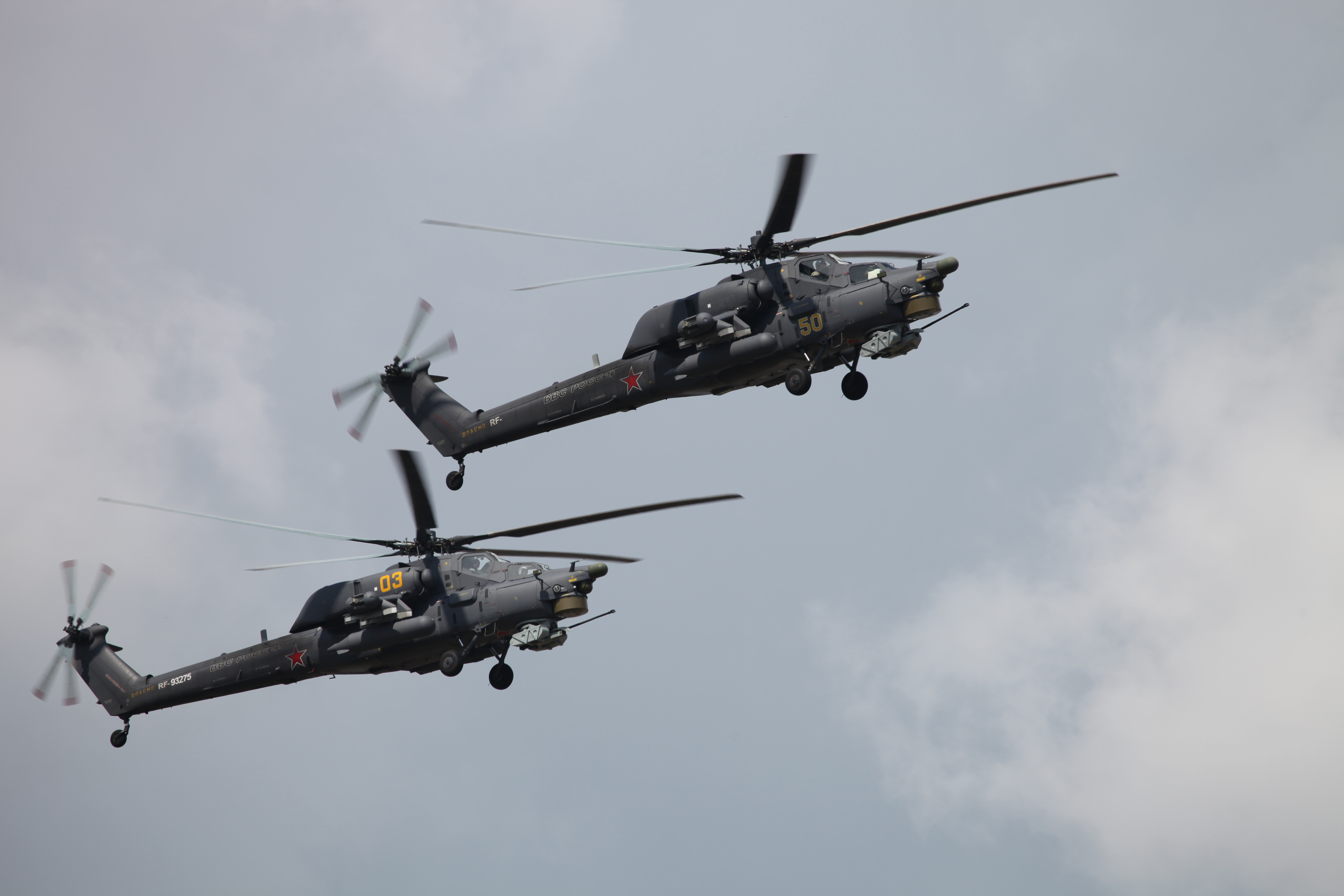
A Russian Mil Mi-28N. The Mil Mi-28 along with the Ka-50 represented the first dedicated attack helicopter of the Soviet Air Forces in the 1980s.

In 1972, following the completion of the Mi-24, development began on a unique attack helicopter with transport capability. The new design had a reduced transport capability (3 troops instead of 8) and was called the Mil Mi-28.

In 1977, a preliminary design of the Mil Mi-28 was chosen, in a classic single-rotor layout. Its transport capability was removed, and it lost its similarity to the Mi-24. Design work on the Mi-28 began under Marat Tishchenko in 1980. In 1981, a design and a mock-up were accepted. The prototype (no. 012) was first flown on 10 November 1982. In this same time frame, Kamov was also attempting to submit its own designs for a new helicopter to the military, which they had designed throughout the early and mid-1980s. In 1984, the Mi-28 completed the first stage of state trials, but in October 1984, the Soviet Air Force chose the more advanced Kamov Ka-50 as the new anti-tank helicopter. The Mi-28 development continued but was given lower priority. In December 1987, production of the Mi-28 at Rosvertol in Rostov-on-Don was approved. After several prototypes were built, production ceased in 1993, with additional development continuing into the 21st century. Changes in the military situation after the Cold War made specialized anti-tank helicopters less useful. The advantages of the Mi-28N, such as all-weather capability, lower cost, and similarity to the Mi-24, have become increasingly important. In 2003, the head of the Russian Air Force stated that the Mi-28N and Ka-50 attack helicopters would become the standard Russian attack helicopter. The first serial Mi-28N was delivered to the Army on 5 June 2006.

=== China ===
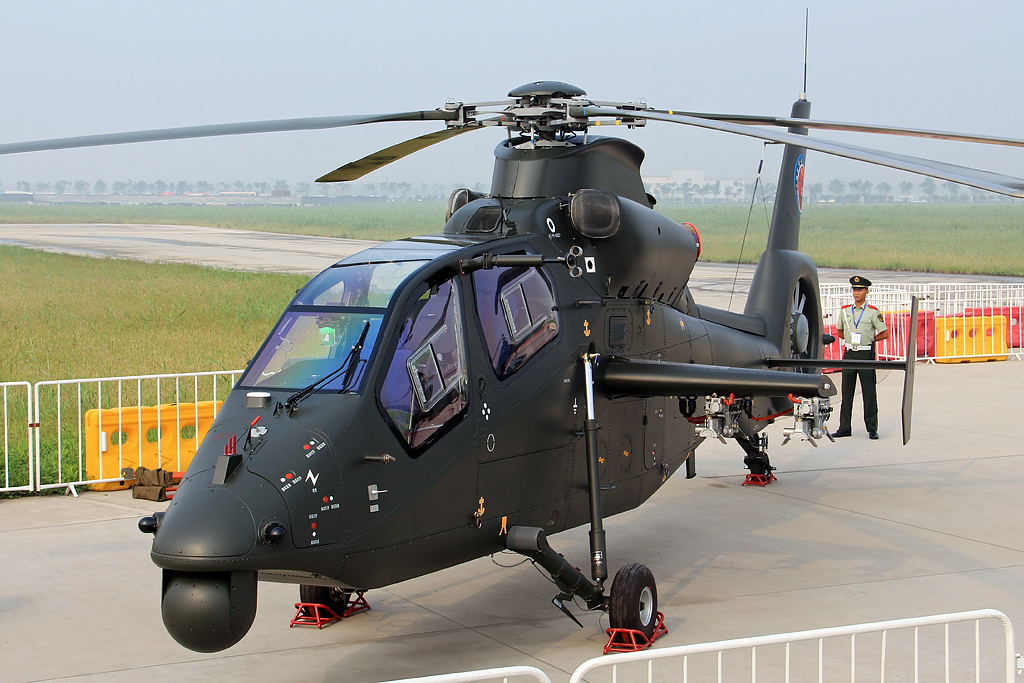
A Harbin Z-19 at the China Helicopter Exposition, 2013

In 1979, the Chinese military studied the problem of countering large armor formations. It concluded that the best conventional solution was to use attack helicopters. Eight Aérospatiale Gazelle armed with Euromissile HOT were procured for evaluation. By the mid-1980s, the Chinese decided a dedicated attack helicopter was required. At the time, they used civilian helicopters converted for the military; these were no longer adequate in the attack role and were suitable only as scouts. Following this, China evaluated the Agusta A129 Mangusta and, in 1988, secured an agreement with the US to purchase AH-1 Cobras and a license to produce BGM-71 TOW missiles; the latter was canceled following the Tiananmen Square protests of 1989 and the resulting arms embargo. The color revolutions prevented the purchase of attack helicopters from Eastern Europe in 1990 and 1991; Bulgaria and Russia rejected Chinese offers to purchase the Mil Mi-24.

While attempting to import foreign designs failed, war games determined that attack helicopters had to be commanded by the army, rather than the air force. This led to the formation of the People's Liberation Army Ground Force Aircraft (PLAGFAF), with an initial strength of 9 Harbin Z-9s. The PLAGFAF conducted tactical experiments to help define the future Z-10's requirements. Research also decided that anti-tank missiles like the BGM-71 TOW were inadequate, and favored an analog to the AGM-114 Hellfire.

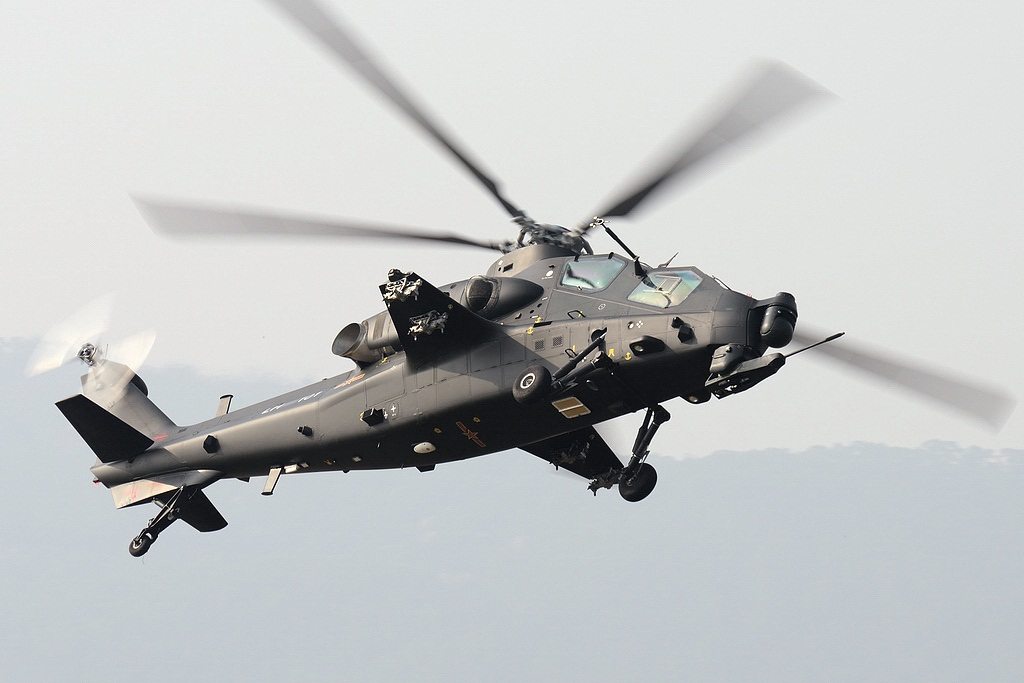
A CAIC Z-10 attack helicopter at the 2012 Zhuhai Airshow

The Gulf War highlighted the urgent need for attack helicopters and revalidated the assessment that a purpose-built design was needed. (At the time, the Chinese military depended on armed utility helicopters such as the Changhe Z-11 and Harbin Z-9.) Also, it demonstrated that the new attack helicopter would need to defend itself against other helicopters and aircraft. The military perceived that once the new attack helicopter entered service, the existing helicopters would be used as scouts.

The Armed Helicopter Developmental Work Team (武装直升机开发工作小组) was formed to develop a new medium helicopter design rather than basing it on the light helicopters then in service. The 602nd and 608th Research Institutes started development of the 6-ton class China Medium Helicopter (CHM) program in 1994. The program was promoted as a civilian project, and was able to secure significant Western technical assistance, such as from Eurocopter (rotor installation design consultancy), Pratt & Whitney Canada (PT6C turboshaft engine) and Agusta Westland (transmission). The Chinese concentrated on areas where it could not obtain foreign help. The 602nd Research Institute's called its proposed armed helicopter design the Z-10 (Chinese: 直-10; lit. 'helicopter-10').

The 602nd Research Institute was assigned as the chief designer, while Harbin Aircraft Manufacturing Corporation (HAMC) of China Aviation Industry Corporation II (AVIC II) was assigned as the primary manufacturer. Nearly four dozen other establishments participated in the program. According to Chinese sources, the initial test flights concluded on December 17, 2003, whereas other sources say they were completed nine months earlier, in March 2003. According to Jane's Information Group, a total of three prototypes had completed over 400 hours of test flights by this time. By 2004, three more prototypes had been built, bringing the total to 6, and a second stage of test flights concluded on December 15, 2004. In one of the test flights, the future commander-in-chief of the People's Liberation Army Ground Force Air Force (PLAGAF), Song Xiangsheng (宋湘生), was on board the prototype. A third stage of intensive test flights followed, taking place during both day and night. By January 2006, weaponry and sensor tests, including firing of live ammunition, had taken place. The helicopter was introduced to the general public in December 2010 and subsequently entered service with the People's Liberation Army.

=== Italy ===
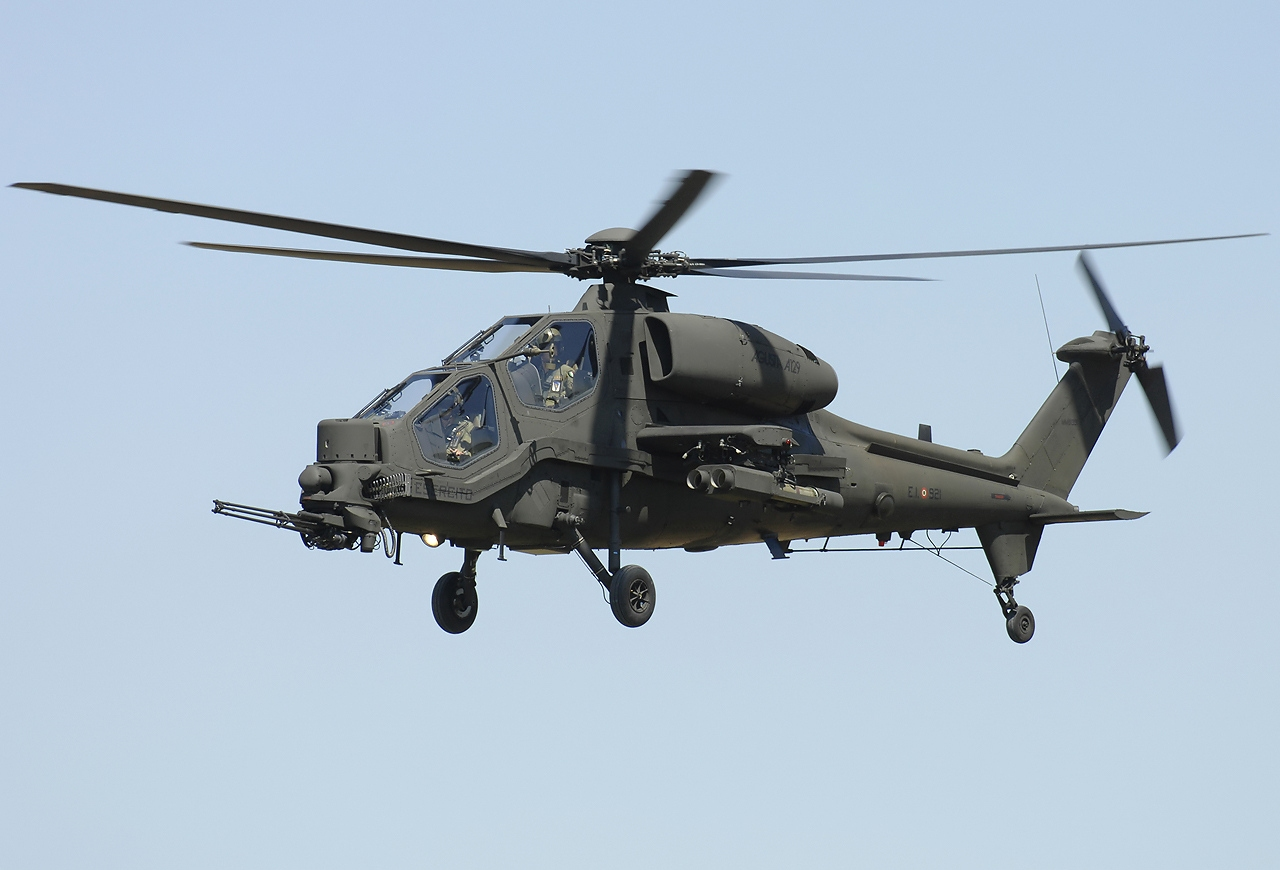
Italian AgustaWestland A129 Mangusta

In 1972, the Italian Army began forming a requirement for a light observation and anti-tank helicopter. Agusta had initially studied developing a combat-oriented derivative of their existing A109 helicopter, but they decided to proceed with a more ambitious helicopter design. In 1978, Agusta formally began the design process on what would become the Agusta A129 Mangusta. On 11 September 1983, the first of five A129 prototypes made the type's maiden flight; the fifth prototype would first fly in March 1986. The Italian Army placed an order for 60 A129s.

The A129 was the first European attack helicopter; as such, it has several original aspects to its design, including being the first helicopter to use a fully computerized integrated management system to reduce crew workload. It was decided that much of the helicopter's functionality was to be automated; as such, parts of the flight and armament systems are monitored and directly controlled by onboard computers. The A129 shares considerable design similarities to Agusta's earlier A109 utility helicopter; the rear section of the A129 was derived from the A109 and incorporated with an entirely new forward section. The A129's fuselage is highly angular and armored for ballistic protection; the composite rotor blades are also able to withstand hits from 23mm cannon fire. The two-person crew, comprising a pilot and gunner, sits in a conventional tandem cockpit.

During the 1980s, Agusta sought to partner with Westland Helicopters to develop a common light attack helicopter; other prospective manufacturing participants in the joint initiative included Fokker and Construcciones Aeronáuticas SA. In 1986, the governments of Italy, the Netherlands, Spain, and the United Kingdom signed a memorandum of understanding to investigate an improved version of the A129, alternatively called the Joint European Helicopter Tonal or Light Attack Helicopter (LAH). By 1988, feasibility studies for four different options had been conducted for the LAH; these would have between 80 percent and 20 percent growth over the initial A129; both single-engine and twin-engine configurations were examined using various new powerplants, as well as a new rotor system, retractable landing gear, improved sensors, and more powerful armament. However, the LAH project collapsed in 1990 following Britain and the Netherlands independently deciding to withdraw from the program and eventually procure the AH-64 Apache instead.

Turkey has sought a new attack helicopter since the 1990s to replace its dwindling Bell AH-1 Cobra and Bell AH-1 SuperCobra fleets. Following a highly protracted selection process, in September 2007, an order was issued for 51 TAI/AgustaWestland T129 ATAK helicopters, a variant of the A129 International. As a part of the deal with AgustaWestland, Turkish defense firm TAI acquired the rights for future manufacturing of the T129; TAI intends to produce the T129 for export customers. Various components and avionics systems are intended to be replaced with indigenously-produced systems as they are developed.

=== France, Germany, and Spain ===
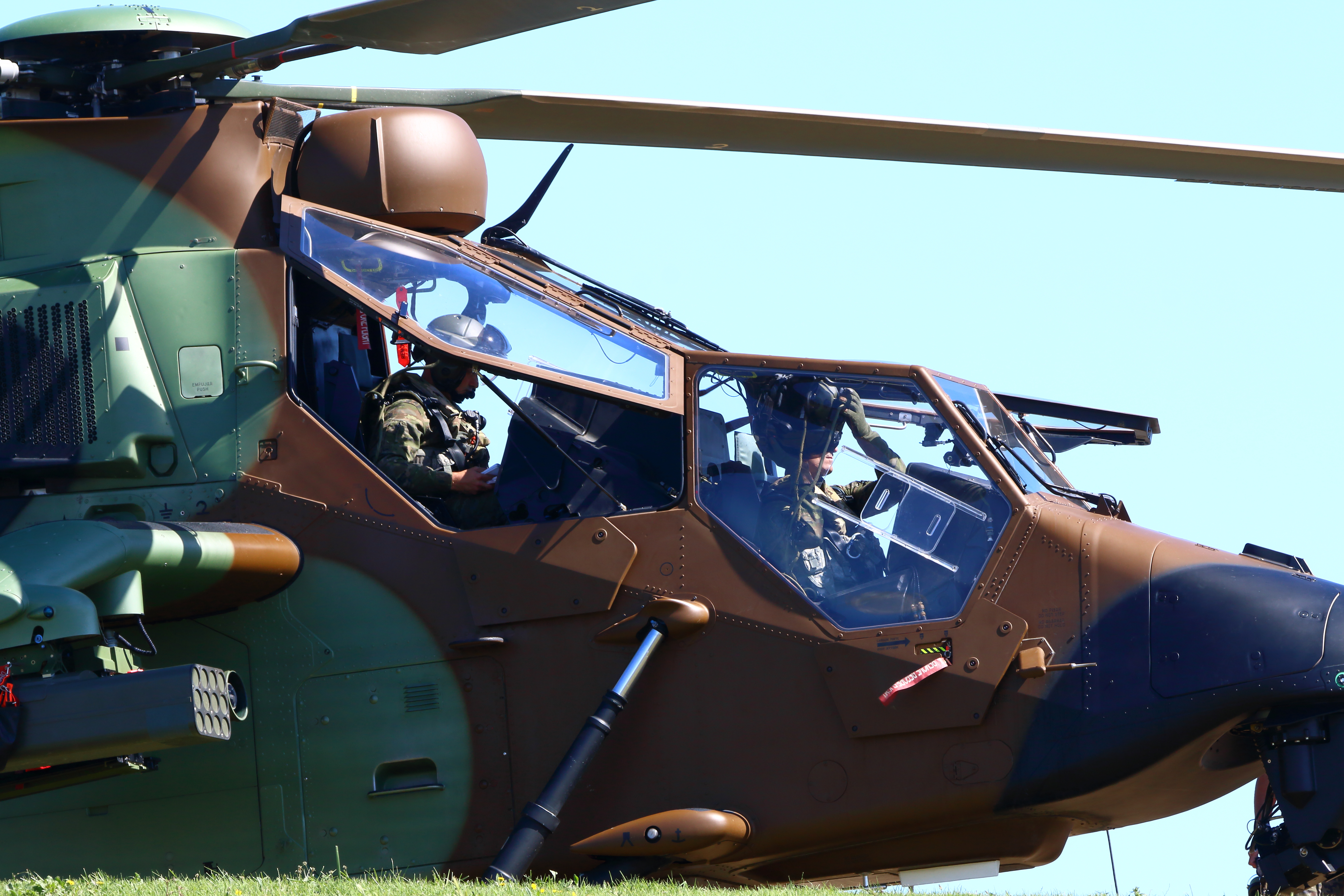
Pilots of a Spanish Eurocopter Tiger prepare for take-off.

In 1984, the French and West German governments issued a requirement for an advanced multirole battlefield helicopter. A joint venture consisting of Aérospatiale and MBB was subsequently chosen as the preferred supplier. According to statements by the French Minister of the Armed Forces André Giraud in April 1986, the collaborative effort had become more expensive than an individual national program and was forecast to take longer to complete as well. In July 1986, a government report on the project alleged that the development had become distanced from the requirements and preferences of the military customers for whom the Tiger was being developed.

Both France and Germany reorganized the program. Thomson-CSF also took over the majority of the Tiger's electronic development work, such as the visual systems and sensors. Despite the early development problems and the political uncertainty between 1984 and 1986, the program was formally relaunched in November 1987; it was at this point that a greater emphasis on the attack helicopter's anti-tank capabilities came about. Much of the project's organizational framework was rapidly redeveloped between 1987 and 1989, such as the installation of a Franco-German Helicopter Office to act as a program executive agency in May 1989.

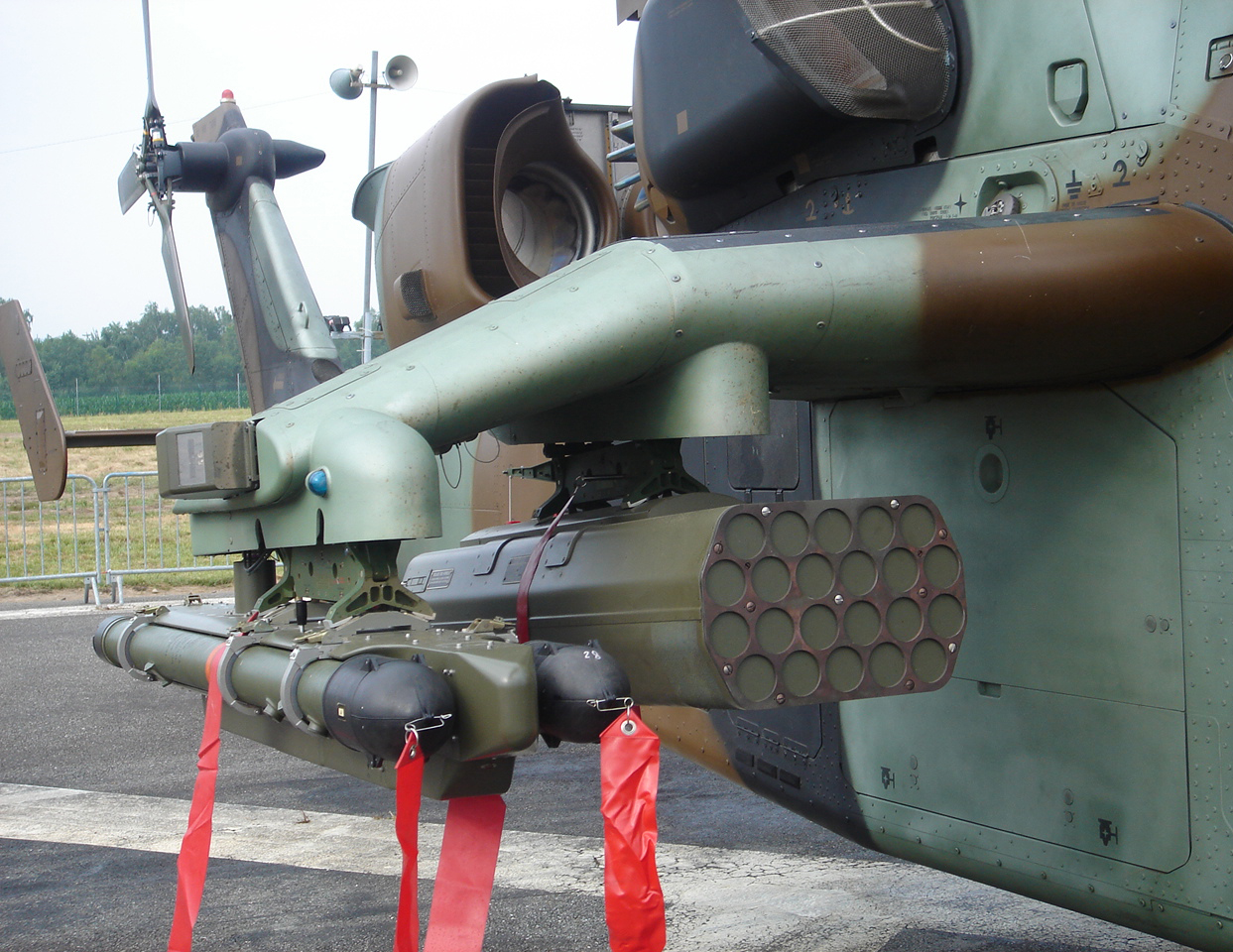
Close-up of the weaponry on a French Eurocopter Tiger in its HAP configuration, featuring 2 guided air-to-air Mistral missiles and a pod of 22 unguided missiles with a range of 4 km

Following the end of the Cold War and subsequent defense budget cuts in the 1990s, financial pressures raised further questions about the program's overall necessity. In 1992, Aérospatiale and MBB, among other companies, merged to form the Eurocopter Group; this led to considerable consolidation of the aerospace industry and the Tiger project itself. A major agreement was struck in December 1996 between France and Germany that cemented the Tiger's prospects and committed the development of supporting elements, such as a series of new generation missile designs for use by the new combat helicopter.

On 18 June 1999, both Germany and France publicly placed orders for an initial batch of 160 Tiger helicopters, 80 each, valued at €3.3 billion. On 22 March 2002, the first production Tiger was rolled out in a large ceremony held at Eurocopter's Donauworth factory; although production models began initial acceptance trials in 2003, the first official delivery to the French Army took place on 18 March 2005; the first official Tiger delivery to Germany followed on 6 April 2005. Germany reduced its order to 57 in March 2013. In 2008 OCCAR estimated the project cost at €7,300,000,000. France's FY2012 budget put their share of the project at €6.3bn (~US$8.5bn), implying a programme cost of €14.5bn (~US$19.5bn) to the three main partners. At FY2012 prices, their 40 HAP cost €27m/unit (~US$36m) and their 40 HAD cost €35.6m/unit (~US$48m); including development costs, the French Tigers cost €78.8m (~US$106m) each.

=== South Africa ===
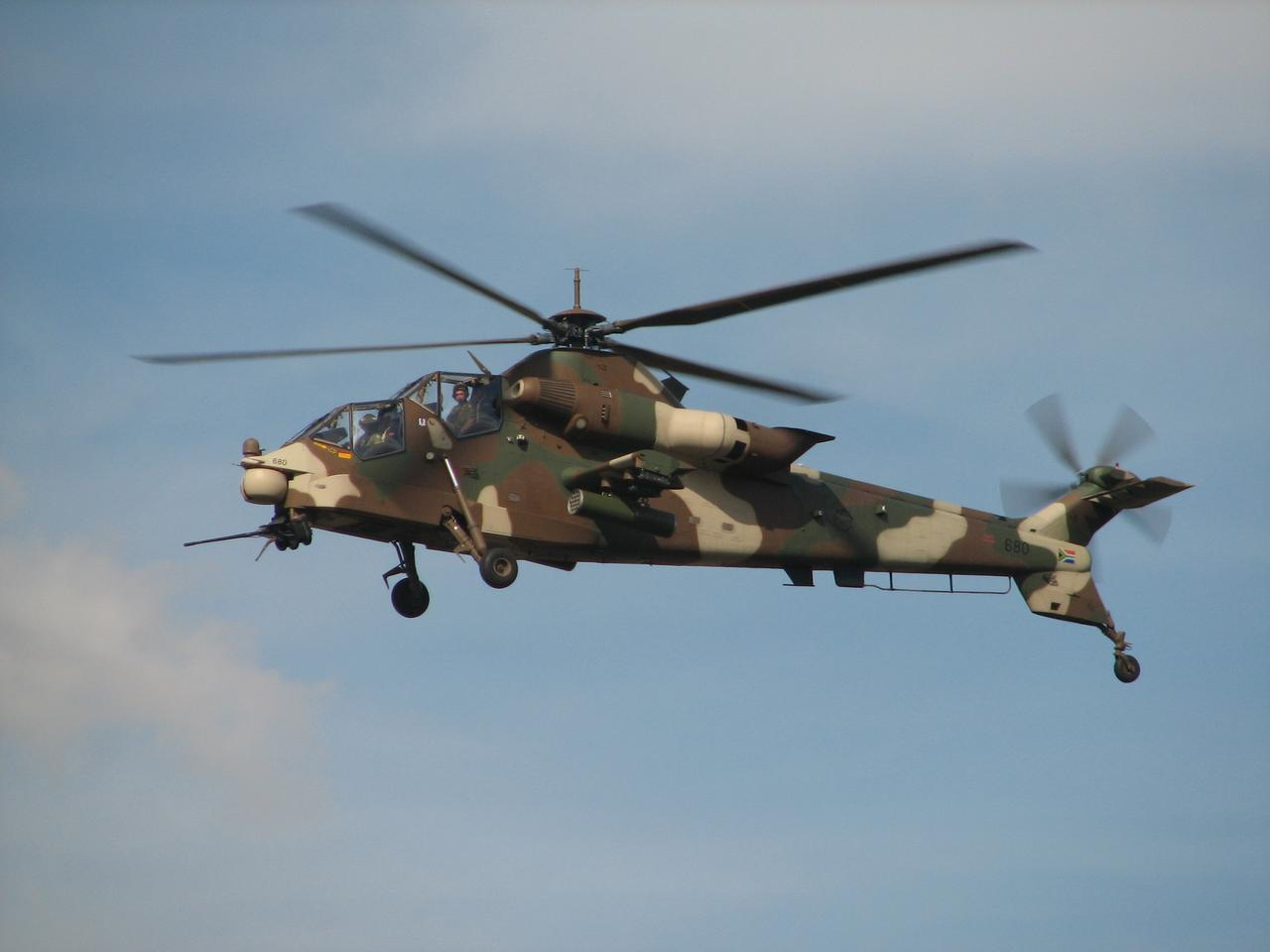
A Denel Rooivalk attack helicopter in service with the South African Air Force

The Rooivalk project began in early 1984 under the auspices of the Atlas Aircraft Corporation, a predecessor of Denel Aviation. Faced with the increasingly conventional nature of the South African Border War, the South African Defence Force recognized the need for a dedicated attack helicopter and accordingly set out the process of developing a suitable aircraft.

The Atlas XH-1 Alpha was the first prototype to emerge from the program. It was developed from an Aérospatiale Alouette III airframe, retaining that helicopter's engine and dynamic components, but replacing the original cockpit with a stepped tandem cockpit, adding a 20 mm cannon on the nose, and converting the undercarriage to a tail-dragger configuration. The XH-1 first flew on 3 February 1985. The results were ultimately sufficient to convince Atlas and the SAAF that the concept was feasible, opening the door to the development of the Rooivalk. During the Rooivalk's development, it was decided to base the aircraft on the dynamic components of the Aérospatiale Super Puma, a larger and more powerful helicopter. These components were already used on the Atlas Oryx, a local upgrade and modification of the Aérospatiale Puma.

Unfortunately, the development of the Rooivalk continued even after the conclusion of the South African Border War, and defense budgets were slashed due to parliamentary changes to the national air force's requirements. This resulted in an extensive development and production period from 1990 to 2007, during which 12 aircraft were produced for use by the South African Air Force. These aircraft were subsequently upgraded to the Block 1F standard by 2011. The upgrade involves improved targeting systems and other avionics, which enable the helicopter to use guided missiles for the first time. The Mokopa ATGM was qualified as part of the upgrade process. Gearbox components were improved and cooling problems with the F2 20 mm cannon were also addressed.

On 1 April 2011, the South African Air Force received the first five of eleven (one of the twelve aircraft originally delivered to the SAAF was written off after an accident) Block 1F upgraded Rooivalk. The ninth and tenth Rooivalk attack helicopters were delivered in September 2012 following their upgrade to the Block 1F initial operating standard. The eleventh and final Rooivalk was delivered on 13 March 2013.

=== India ===
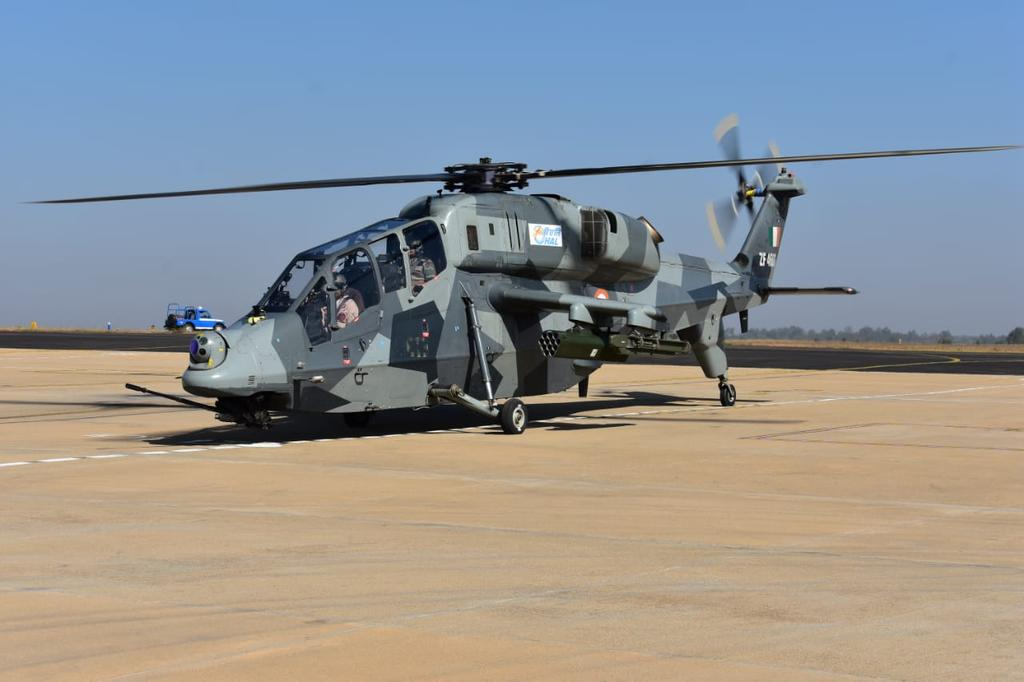
India's HAL Prachand in camouflage colors

The Indian Army deploys the Mil Mi-35 (export variant of Mi-24V) and HAL Rudra as of 2014. During the Kargil War in 1999, the Indian Air Force and the Indian Army found that there was a need for helicopters that can operate at such high-altitude conditions with ease. Limitations in terms of both high payloads and maneuverability of the existing Mi-35 fleet reportedly contributed to India developing indigenous rotorcraft, such as the HAL Prachand and HAL Rudra, to perform multi-role high-altitude combat operations. The HAL Rudra was a modified version of HAL Dhruv, free of any major modifications to the airframe to quickly create an armed variant for the Indian Army.

The HAL Prachand is a purpose-built attack helicopter, expressly designed to overcome several operational shortcomings of prior attack rotorcraft. By 2010, the Indian Air Force was reportedly set to acquire 65 LCHs while the Indian Army's Aviation Corps was also to procure 114 LCHs for its own purposes. During February 2020, the LCH was declared ready for production, the final assembly line has been established at HAL's Helicopter Division in Bangalore. Prime minister Narendra Modi conducted the handover ceremony of HAL Prachand to the Indian Armed forces in Jhansi.

== Operations ==
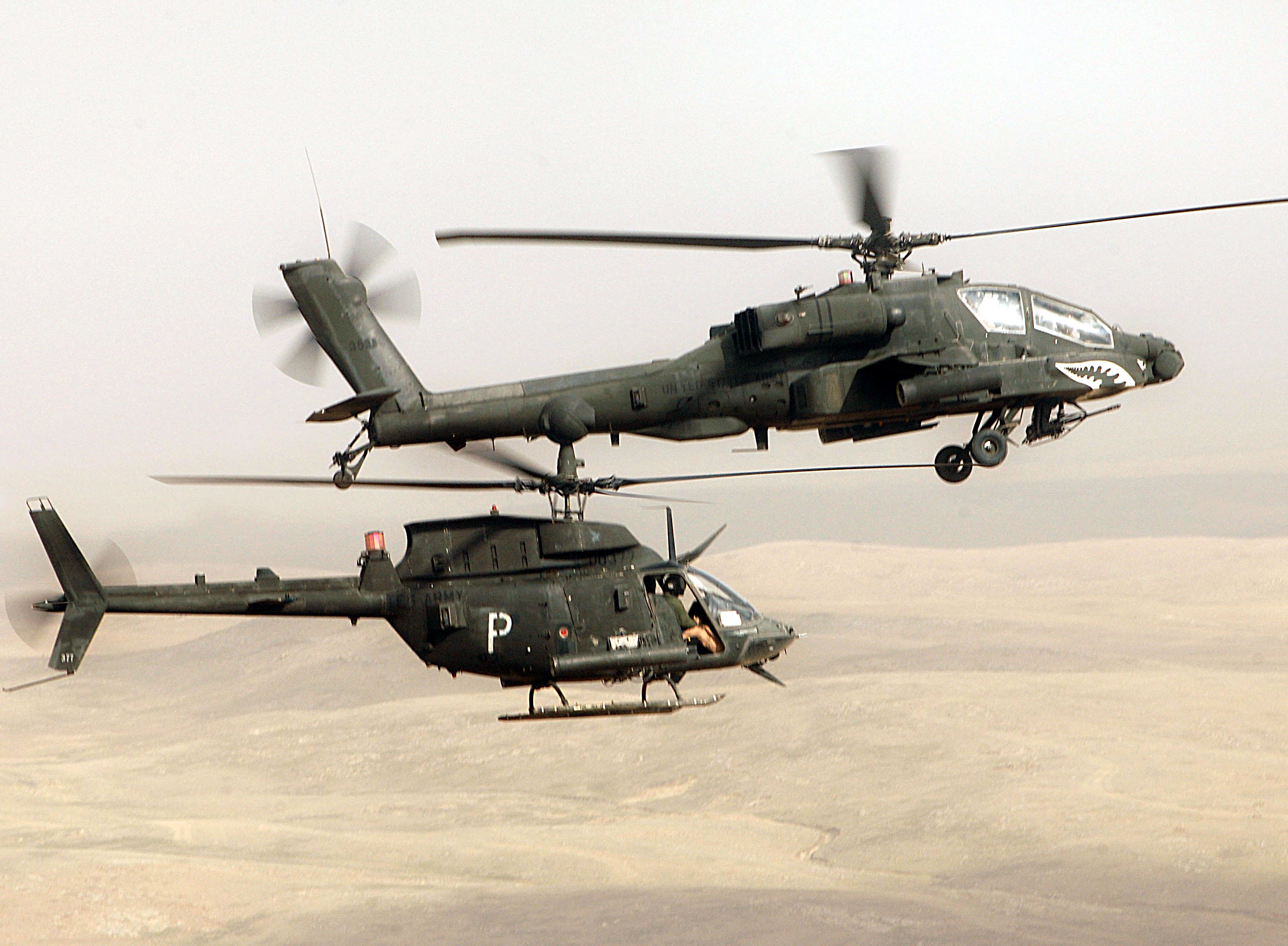
Above, a U.S. Army's AH-64 Apache attack helicopter and below, an OH-58D armed scout helicopter

The Iran–Iraq War of the 1980s saw "the most intensive use of the helicopters" in a conventional war ever, as well as the only confirmed helicopter dogfights in history; in particular, Iranian Army Aviation AH-1J SeaCobras engaged with Mi-24 Hind and Mi-8 Hip helicopters of the Iraqi Army Air Corps. The Iranian Cobras also attacked advancing Iraqi divisions in conjunction with fixed-wing F-4 Phantoms armed with Maverick missiles, destroying numerous armoured vehicles and impeded the Iraqi advance, albeit not completely halting it.

The 1990s could be seen as the coming of age for the U.S. attack helicopter. The AH-64 Apache was used extensively during Operation Desert Storm with great success, being used to fire the first shots of the conflict, destroying Iraqi early warning radar and surface-to-air missile (SAM) sites with their Hellfire missiles. They were later used successfully in both of their operational roles, to direct attack against enemy armor and as aerial artillery in support of ground troops; both Hellfire missiles and cannon attacks by Apaches destroyed numerous enemy tanks and armored cars. General Carl Stiner claimed that: "You could fire that Hellfire missile through a window from four miles [6.4 km] away at night." However, serious logistical problems limited operations; Apaches in the Iraqi theater flew only one-fifth of planned flight-hours.

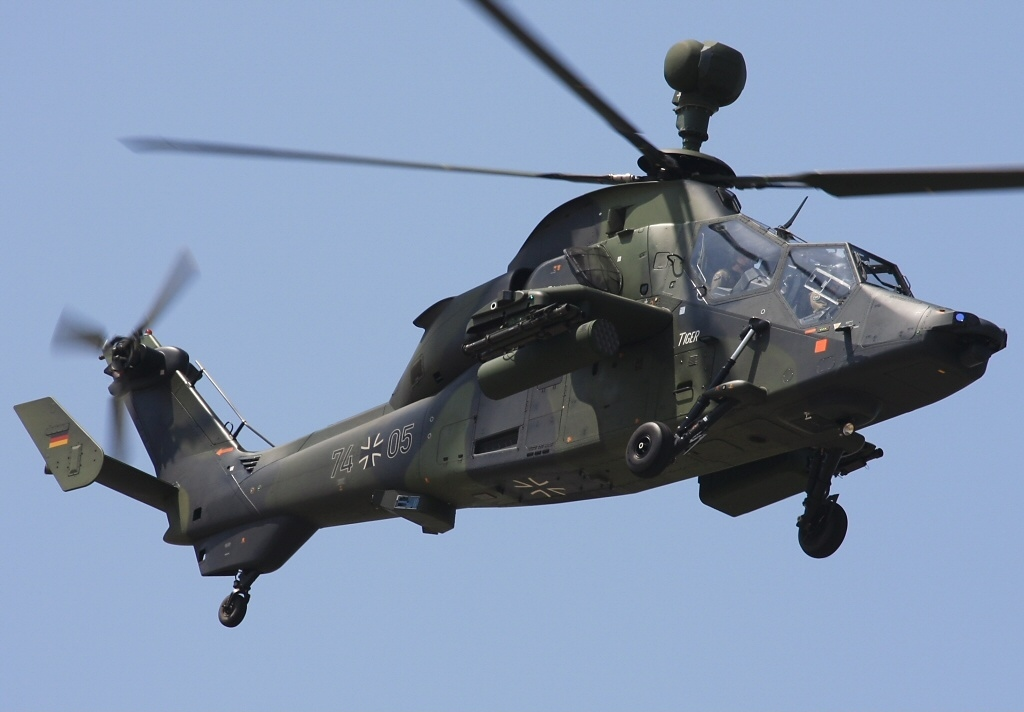
European Eurocopter Tiger of the German Army

The "deep attack" role of independently operating attack helicopters came into question after a failed mission, during the 2003 Gulf War attack on the Karbala Gap. A second mission in the same area, four days later, but coordinated with artillery and fixed-wing aircraft, was more successful with minimal losses. In October 2014, U.S. Army AH-64s and Air Force fighters participated in four air strikes on Islamic State units northeast of Fallujah. In June 2016, Apaches were used in support of the Iraqi Army's Mosul offensive and provided support during the Battle of Mosul, sometimes flying night missions supporting Iraqi operations.

In 2011, France and Britain sent Eurocopter Tiger and AgustaWestland Apache attack helicopters to Libya. The primary objective of the 2011 military intervention was to protect civilians in accordance with UN Security Council Resolution 1973. Within days of the Apaches deployment, it had completed a variety of tasks such as destroying tanks, checkpoints held by pro-Gaddafi forces and vehicles carrying ammunitions loyal to Muammar Gaddafi. Apache operations over Libya have been heavily influenced and supported by NATO reconnaissance flights and intelligence missions; information was continually relayed to update target information, assess the threat of Surface to Air missiles (SAM), and the presence of civilians, enabling real time changes to missions.

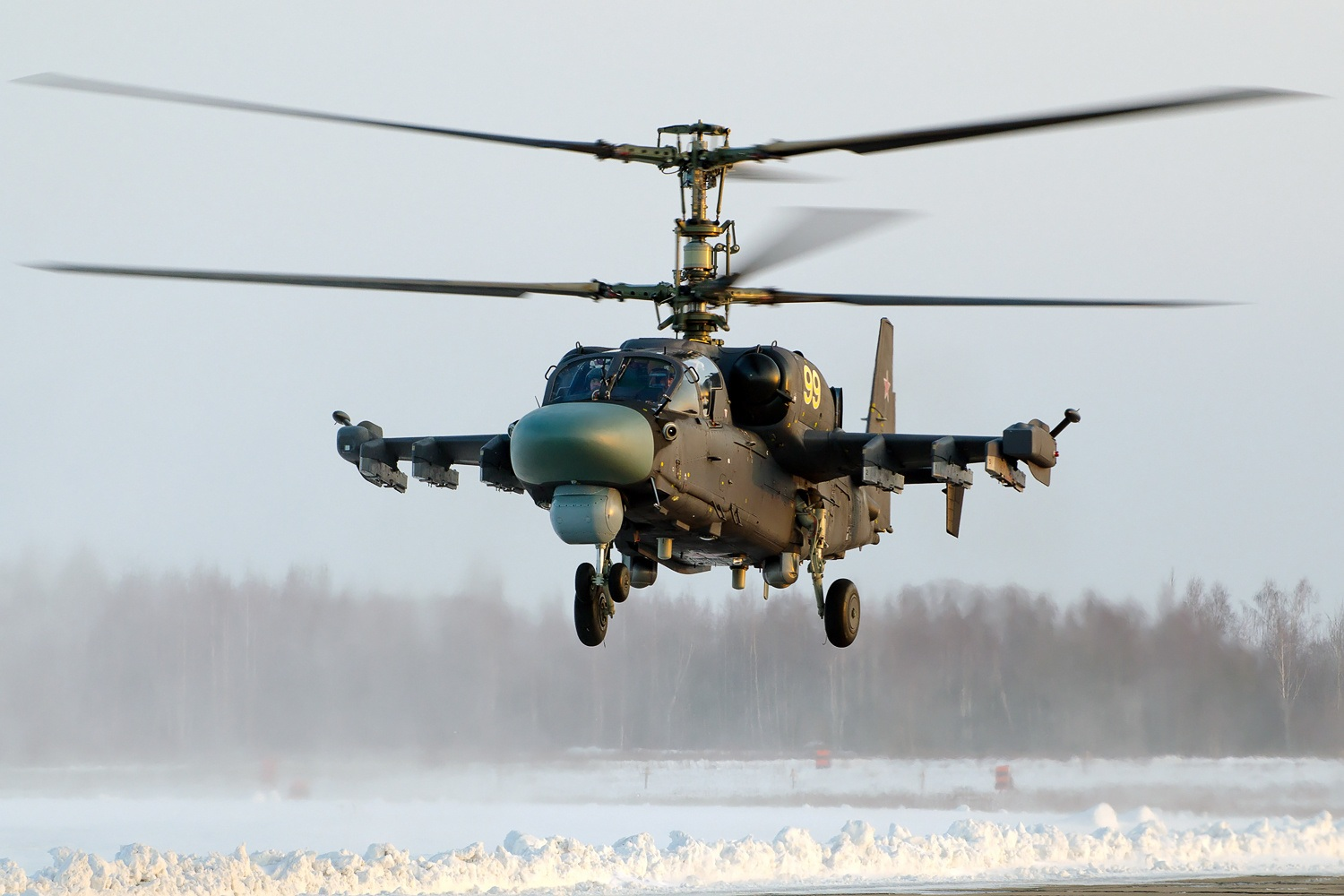
A Kamov Ka-52 at Torzhok Air Base

In 2013, the South African National Defence Force announced that it would deploy Denel Rooivalk attack helicopters to the Democratic Republic of the Congo to support the United Nations Organization Stabilization Mission in the Democratic Republic of the Congo. This was the helicopter's first combat deployment. Three helicopters from 16 Squadron SAAF were deployed to the region and since November 2013 it was involved in heavy fighting alongside the United Nations Force Intervention Brigade, against rebels operating in North Kivu, in particular the M23 militia, which consisted of hardened former government troops equipped with relatively heavy weaponry such as main battle tanks and anti-aircraft weaponry. During its first-ever combat mission, it proved instrumental in routing the rebels from their hilltop strongholds as part of an offensive by the United Nations Force Intervention Brigade and the Military of the Democratic Republic of the Congo.

== See also ==
- Army aviation
- J-CATCH
