= Arab British Helicopter Company =

- Native name: الشركة العربية البريطانية للمروحيات
- Company type: Public
- Traded as: ABHCO
- Industry: Aerospace
- Founded: March 1978; 48 years ago
- Headquarters: Helwan, Egypt, Egypt
- Products: Westland Gazelle; Westland Lynx; Rolls-Royce Gem
- Parent: Arab Organization for Industrialization

The Arab British Helicopter Company (ABHCO), (Arabic:الشركة العربية البريطانية للمروحيات) is an Anglo-Italiano-Egyptian joint venture that specialises in helicopter manufacturing.

It was established during 1978 following an agreement with the British aerospace company Westland Helicopters as an affiliate of the Arab Organization for Industrialization (AOI). It was intended for the venture to assemble the Westland Lynx helicopter, along with its Rolls-Royce Gem engines, at ABHCO's facility in Helwan, 18 miles south of Cairo, Egypt. Despite orders being placed for 250 ABHCO-built Lynx helicopters, none were ever completed due to an economic boycott being enacted on Egypt by the other Arab nations during the late 1970s. Following a licensing agreement, the firm also undertook the manufacture of the Westland Gazelle.

== History ==
During the 1970s, Egypt commenced widescale efforts to replace arms imports with domestic production to provide military equipment to the rest of the Middle East as well as to build up Arab military industries. This international initiative was formalised in 1975; Egtpt was joined by various other Arab partner nations in the endeavour, including Saudi Arabia, the United Arab Emirates, and Qatar. On 29 April 1975, these four nations signed a treaty that established the Arab Organization for Industrialization (AOI), a defense manufacturing interest that based much of its infrastructure, including its headquarters and much of its production facilities, within Egypt.

In parallel with these regional diplomatic developments, Egyptian officials were negotiating multiple industrial and defense-related agreements between both France and Britain. As early as September 1974, the British and Egyptian governments initiated talks to establish a new Egyptian helicopter manufacturer. During March 1978, the Arab British Helicopter Company (ABHCO) was formally established in a $595 million deal with Westland Helicopters. It was structured as a joint venture between AOI and Westland, but based in Egypt. Initially, it was intended for ABHCO to engage in the domestic assembly of British Westland Lynx helicopters at ABHCO's Helwan facility. In addition to manufacturing the type, other activities, including the overhaul, testing and sale of Lynx helicopters was also envisioned. A separate agreement was formalised with Rolls-Royce to license manufacture the Lynx's Gem turboshaft engines at the Helwan facility.

During 1975, an initial order for 42 Westland Gazelles was placed by Egypt. It was agreed that ABHCO would undertake the assembly of these rotorcraft via a recently acquired licensing agreement. Throughout the 1980s, the company undertook the assembly of a significant number of Gazelles; the associated British Arab Engine Company also produced the Turbomeca Astazou turboshaft powerplants for these Egyptian-build Gazelles.

The fortunes of ABHCO were heavily shaped by both Egyptian and international politics alike. Following the signing of the Camp David Accords between Egyptian President Anwar Sadat and Israeli Prime Minister Menachem Begin on 17 September 1978, Egypt was subject to an economic boycott by many of its former Arab partners, who also moved to liquidate jointly held assets. This threw the existence of AOI, and therefore ABHCO, into a state of uncertainty for a time. All four member states in ABHCO had placed orders for a cumulative batch of 250 locally-built Lynx helicopters, but these would be cancelled without redress.

In response, Egypt declared that AOI, which had become a major industrial employer in the nation, would become a purely Egyptian endeavour. However, this unilateral declaration posed some legislative difficulties. The company remained active as a manufacturing venture for several years, but accumulated a considerably high level of debt and failed to fulfil licensing payments to Westland. During the 1980s and 1990s, Westland pursued ABHCO over incomplete payments, resorting to legal action being taken against the company.
