= Aérospatiale Gazelle =

Light helicopter, French, 1973–present

SA 341/SA 342 Gazelle
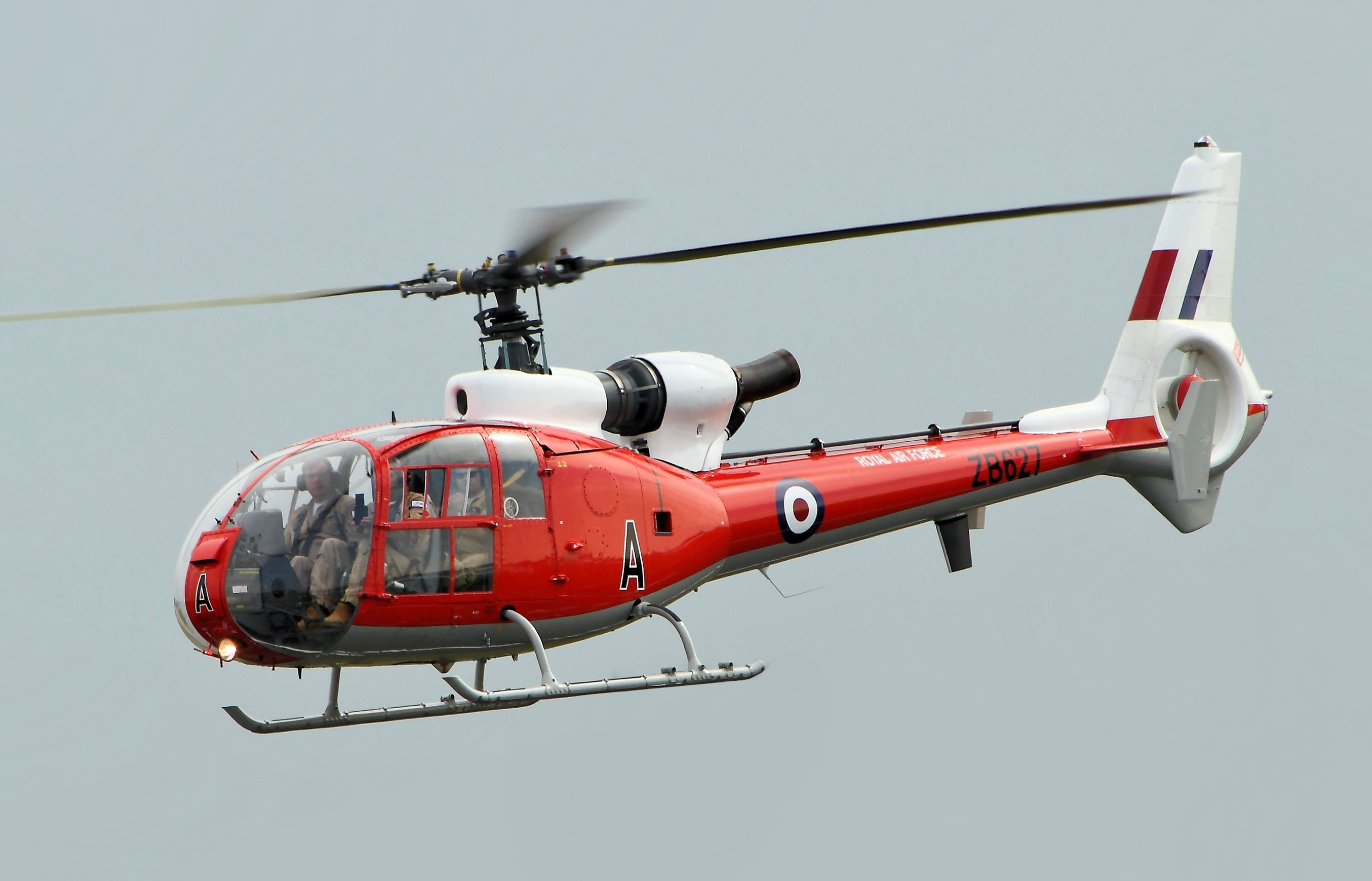
- A Royal Air Force Gazelle over RIAT 2014

General information
- Type: Utility helicopter / Armed helicopter
- National origin: France
- Manufacturer: Sud Aviation, later Aérospatiale
- Built by: ABHCO; SOKO; Westland Aircraft
- Status: In service
- Primary users: French Army British Army (retired); Egyptian Air Force; Lebanese Air Force
- Number built: 1,700

History
- Manufactured: 1967–1996
- Introduction date: 1973
- First flight: 7 April 1967 (SA.340)
- Developed from: Aérospatiale Alouette III

The Aérospatiale Gazelle (company designations SA 340, SA 341 and SA 342) is a five-seat helicopter developed and initially produced by the French aircraft company Sud Aviation, and later by Aérospatiale. It is the first helicopter to feature a fenestron tail instead of a conventional tail rotor, as well as being the first helicopter to be adapted for single-pilot operations under instrument flight rules.

The Gazelle was developed during the 1960s as a successor to the Alouette II as well as to meet a French Army requirement for a new lightweight observation helicopter. The Gazelle is considerably larger than the preceding Alouette series, yet is still powered by a single Turbomeca Astazou turbine engine. Innovations in the design of the Gazelle, aside from the fenestron, included an emphasis on minimal maintenance requirements, the use of a articulated rotor system, (feather, drag and pitch hinges), and rotor blades manufactured with composite materials. The rotor blades took a considerable amount of time to develop. In February 1967, France and the United Kingdom inked a cooperation agreement, which would see Westland Aircraft produce the Gazelle on British soil and partner with Sud Aviation on future refinements and upgrades to the Gazelle. On 7 April 1967, the Gazelle performed its maiden flight.

The first operational Gazelles were introduced in 1971. Initially, manufacturing lines for the type were established in both France and Britain, but later on, it was also manufactured under license by SOKO in Yugoslavia and the Arab British Helicopter Company (ABHCO) in Egypt. Multiple armed variants, oriented towards roles such as anti-tank gunship (SA 342M), light support (SA 341F), and anti-air variants were promptly produced for various branches of the French armed forces. The Gazelle was flown by all branches of the British armed forces—the Royal Air Force, Royal Navy (including in support of the Royal Marines) and the British Army in a variety of roles. The Gazelle has been procured and operated by a wide range of export customers. While it has been typically operated in a military capacity to perform light transport, scouting, and light attack missions, the Gazelle has also seen use with civil operators as well.

During its lengthy service life, the Gazelle has participated in numerous conflicts around the world, including by Syria during the 1982 Lebanon War, by Rwanda during the Rwandan Civil War in the 1990s, and by numerous participants on both sides of the 1991 Gulf War. By the twenty-first century, many operators were in the process of replacing the Gazelle with newer rotorcraft; in French service, the Gazelle has been supplanted as an attack helicopter by the larger and more modern Eurocopter Tiger, but remained active for some time in the scout helicopter role. Numerous operators have elected to upgrade their rotorcraft for continued service, the type still being in use with multiple countries as of 2024. Production ended in 1996.

== Development ==
The SA 340 Gazelle prototype in 1967 with its original conventional tail rotor

In 1966, Sud Aviation began working on a light observation helicopter to replace its Alouette II with seating for five people. The Gazelle originated in a French Army requirement for a lightweight observation helicopter intended to replace the Aérospatiale Alouette III; early on in the aircraft's development, the decision was taken to enlarge the helicopter to enable greater versatility and make it more attractive for the export market.

Early on, the Gazelle attracted British interest, which resulted in a major production work share agreement between Sud Aviation and Westland. Under the terms of the agreement, Westland would have a 65% work share in the manufacturing of the units destined for the British military, and be a partner to Sud Aviation on further refinements and upgrades to the Gazelle. The deal, signed in February 1967, allowed the production in Britain of 292 Gazelles and 48 Sud Aviation SA 330 Puma medium transport helicopters ordered by the British armed forces. In return, Sud Aviation was given a work share in the manufacturing programme for the 40 Westland Lynx naval helicopters for the French Navy. Ultimately, Westland would produce a total of 262 Gazelles of various models, mainly for various branches of the British armed forces but Gazelles for the civil market were also produced.

The first prototype SA 340 flew for the first time on 7 April 1967, it initially flew with a conventional tail rotor taken from the Alouette II. The tail was replaced in early 1968 with the distinctive fenestron tail on the second prototype. Four SA 341 prototypes were flown, including one for British firm Westland Helicopters. On 6 August 1971, the first production Gazelle conducted its first flight. On 13 May 1967, a Gazelle demonstrated its speed capabilities when two separate world speed records were broken on a closed course, achieving speeds of 307 km/h over 3 kilometres and 292 km/h over 100 kilometres.

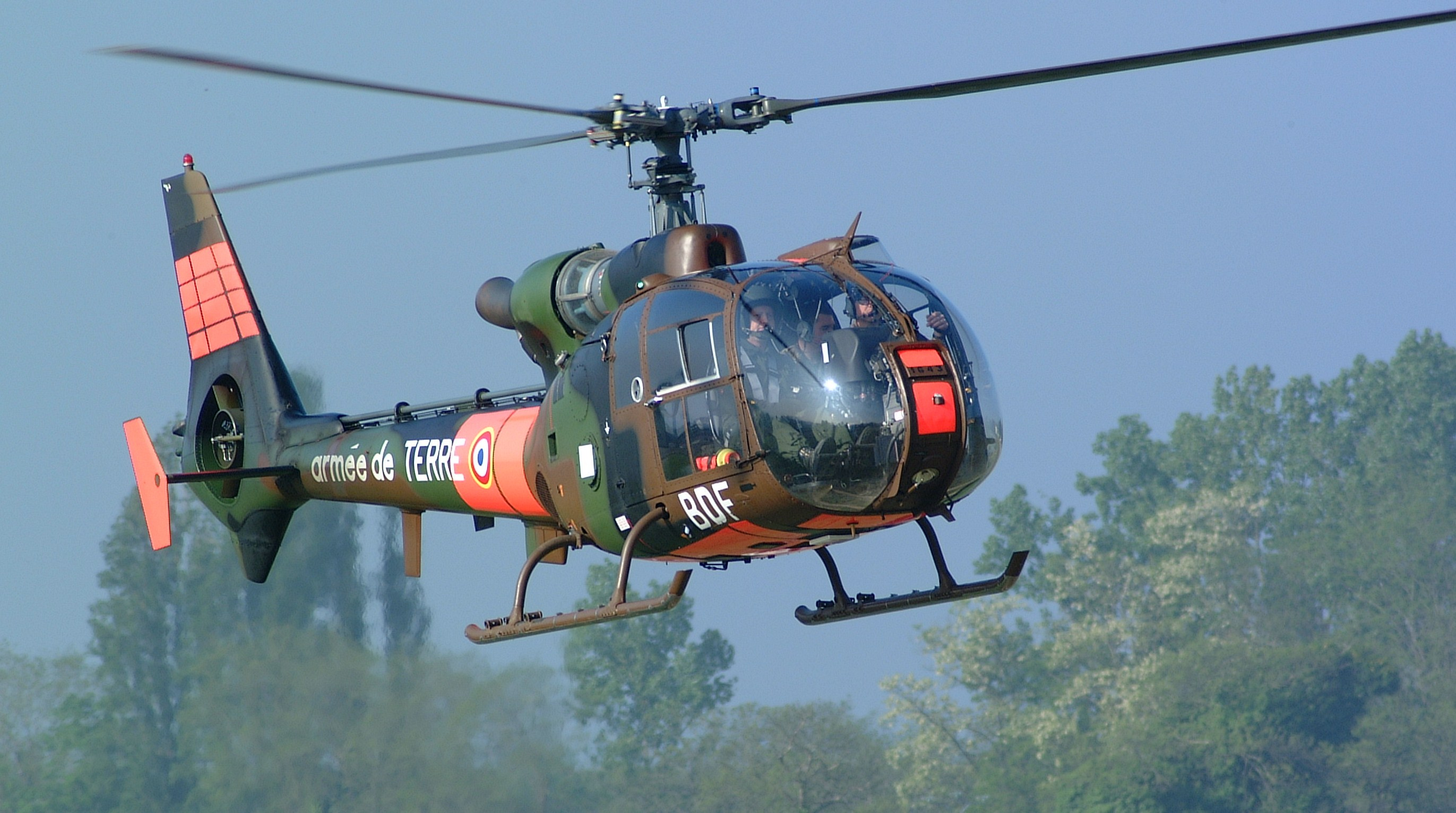
A French Army Gazelle in flight, 2004

In service with the French Army Light Aviation (ALAT), the Gazelle was used primarily as an anti-tank gunship (SA 342M) armed with Euromissile HOT missiles. A light support version (SA 341F) equipped with a 20 mm cannon is used as well as anti-air variants carrying the Mistral air-to-air missile (Gazelle Celtic based on the SA 341F, Gazelle Mistral based on the SA 342M). The latest anti-tank and reconnaissance versions carry the Viviane thermal imagery system and so are called Gazelle Viviane. The Gazelle is being replaced in frontline duties by the Eurocopter Tiger, but will continue to be used for light transport and liaison roles.

Four versions of the Gazelle were used by the British forces. The SA 341D was designated 'Gazelle HT.3' in RAF service, equipped as a helicopter pilot trainer (hence HT). The SA 341E was used by the RAF for communications duties and VIP transport as the 'Gazelle HCC.4'. The SA 341C was purchased as the 'Gazelle HT.2' pilot trainer for the Royal Navy; training variants were replaced by the Eurocopter Squirrel HT1. The SA 341B was equipped to a specification for the Army Air Corps as the 'Gazelle AH.1' (from "Army Helicopter Mark 1").

The Gazelle proved to be a commercial success, which led Aérospatiale, as Sud Aviation had become, to quickly develop and introduce the SA 342 Gazelle series, which was equipped with uprated powerplants. Licensed production of the type did not just take place in the UK, domestic manufacturing was also conducted by Egyptian firm ABHCO. Yugoslavian production by SOKO reportedly produced a total of 132 Gazelles. As the Gazelle became progressively older, newer combat helicopters were brought into service in the anti-tank role; thus those aircraft previously configured as attack helicopters were often repurposed for other, secondary support duties, such as an air observation post (AOP) for directing artillery fire, airborne forward air controller (ABFAC) to direct ground-attack aircraft, casualty evacuation, liaison, and communications relay missions. According to David Oliver, 1,560 Gazelles had been produced in both France and Britain at the end of production.

== Design ==
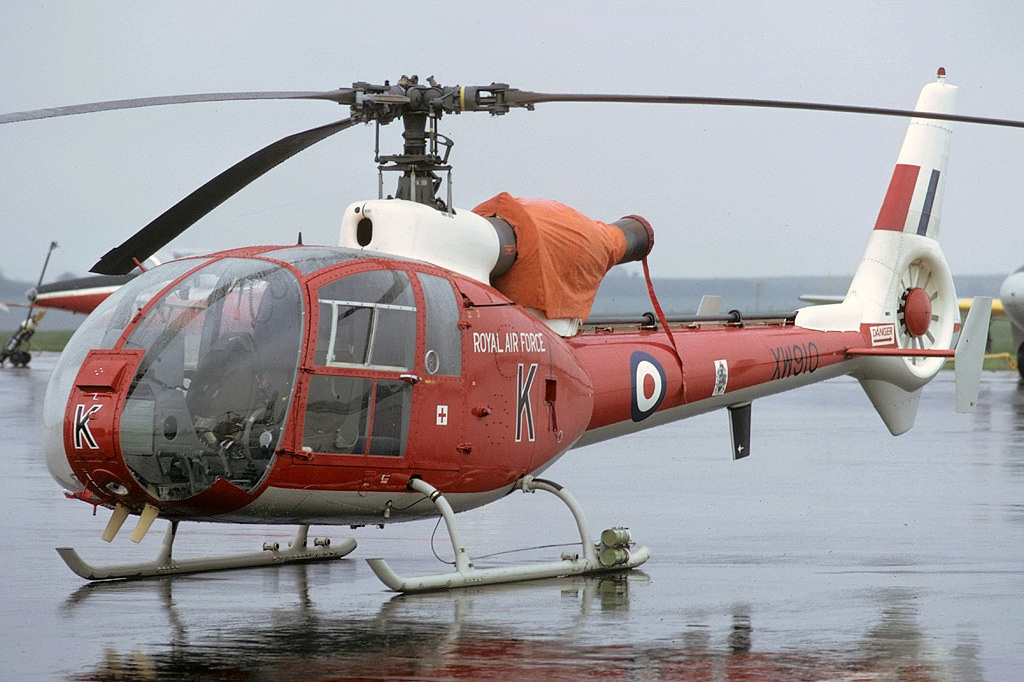
Westland SA-341D Gazelle, 1975

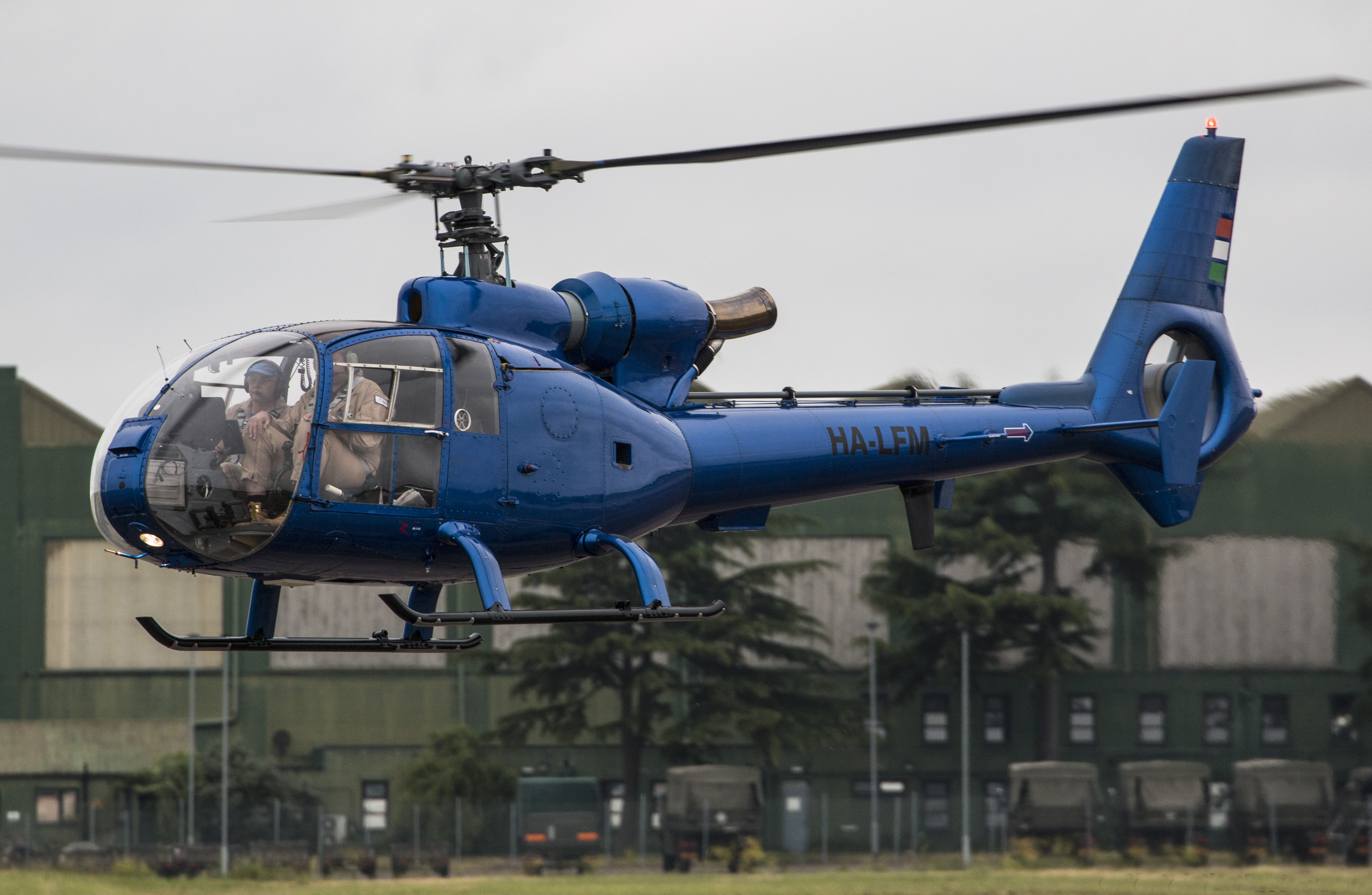
A SA341G Gazelle in 2015 in the U.K.

The Aérospatiale Gazelle was originally developed as a replacement to the popular Alouette helicopter series; various aspects of the Gazelle are shared with the Alouette, including its mission types, loose dimensions, and operational equipment. The Gazelle featured several key innovations, being the first helicopter with a fenestron or fantail; this is a shrouded multi-blade anti-torque device housed in the vertical surface of the tail in place of a conventional tail rotor. The fenestron, while requiring a small increase in power at slow speeds, has advantages such as being considerably less vulnerable to damage, safer for people in close proximity to the helicopter, and low power requirements at cruising speeds, and has been described as "far more suitable for high-speed flight". The fenestron has been credited with helping the Gazelle to become the world's fastest helicopter in its class.

The original main rotor system of the Gazelle was based upon the rigid rotor system developed by Messerschmitt-Bölkow-Blohm for the MBB Bo 105; however, due to control problems experienced while at high speeds upon prototype rotorcraft, the rigid rotor was substituted for a articulated rotor counterpart on production aircraft. The difficulties experienced with the early design of the main rotor was one of the factors contributing to the lengthy development time of the Gazelle. The individual rotor blades were made from composite materials, primarily fiberglass, and had been designed for an extremely long operational lifespan; composite rotor blades would become common on later helicopters. The main rotor is described as having a "wide range of tolerance" for autorotation.

The Gazelle is capable of transporting up to five passengers and up to 1,320 pounds of cargo on the underside cargo hook, or alternatively up to 1,100 pounds of freight in 80 cubic feet of internal space in the rear of the cabin. Armed variants would carry up to four HOT (Haut subsonique Optiquement Téléguidé Tiré d'un Tube) wire-guided anti-tank missiles, or a forward firing 20mm cannon mounted to the fuselage sides with its ammunition supply placed in the cabin. Various optional equipment can be installed upon the Gazelle, such as fittings for engine noise suppression, 53 gallon ferry tanks, a rescue winch capable of lifting up to 390 pounds, emergency flotation gear, particle filter, high landing skids, cabin heater, adjustable landing lights, and engine anti-icing systems. While the Gazelle had been developed under a military-orientated design programme, following the type's entry to service increasing attention to the commercial market was paid as well. The type was marketed to civil customers; notably, civilian operator Vought Helicopters at one point had a fleet of at least 70 Gazelles. Civil-orientated Gazelles often included an external baggage access door mounted beneath the main cabin.

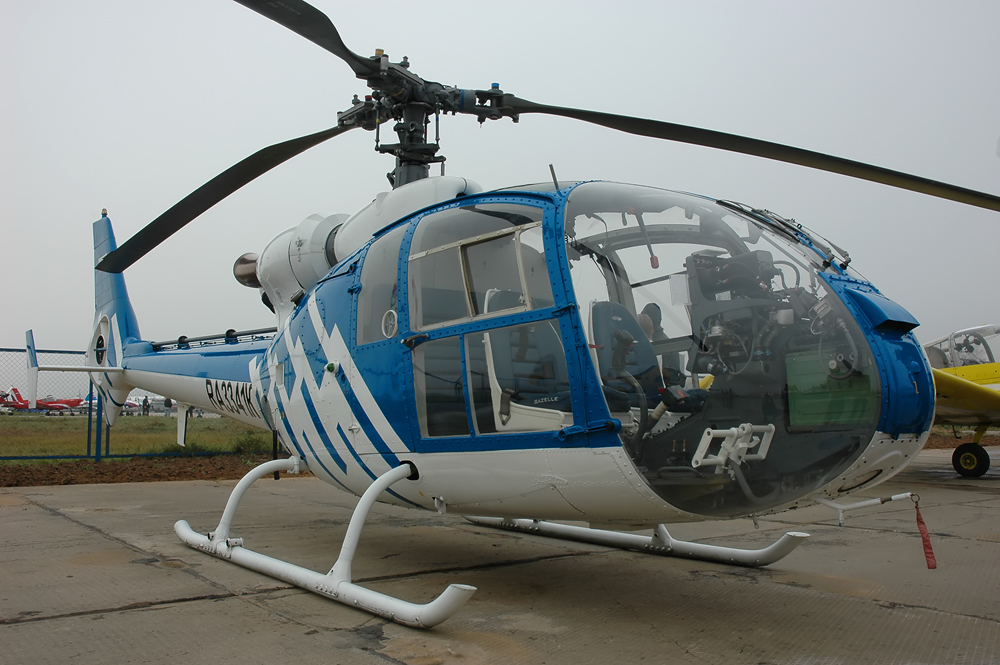
Civil SA 341G Gazelle

The docile flying abilities of the Gazelle are such that it has been reported as being capable of comfortably flying without its main hydraulic system operation at speeds of up to 100 knots. The flight controls are highly responsive; unusually, the Gazelle lacks a throttle or a trimming system. Hydraulic servo boosters are present on all flight control circuits to mitigate control difficulties in the event of equipment failure. The Gazelle was the first helicopter to be adapted for single-pilot operations under instrument flight rules. An advanced duplex autopilot system was developed by Honeywell in order to allow the pilot to not be overworked during solo flights; the Gazelle was chosen as the platform to develop this capability as it was one of the faster and more stable helicopters in service at that point and had a reputation for being easy to fly.

The Gazelle was designed to be easy to maintain, all bearings were life-rated without need for continuous application of lubrication and most fluid reservoirs to be rapidly inspected. The emphasis in the design stage of achieving minimal maintenance requirements contributed towards the helicopter's low running costs; many of the components were designed to have a service life in excess of 700 flying hours, and in some cases 1,200 flight hours, before requiring replacement. Due to the performance of many of the Gazelle's subsystems, features pioneered upon the Gazelle such as the fenestron would appear upon later Aerospatiale designs.

As the Gazelle continued to serve into the 21st century, several major modernisation and upgrade programs were undertaken, commonly adding new avionics to increase its capabilities. Aerotec group offered an overhaul package to existing operators, which comprised upgraded ballistic protection, night vision goggles, new munitions including rockets and machine guns, and 3D navigational displays; even during the 2010s, operators such as Egypt were reportedly interested in upgrading their Gazelles. QinetiQ developed a Direct Voice Input (DVI) system for the Gazelle, the DVI system enables voice control over many aspects of the aircraft, lowering the demands placed upon the crew. In September 2011, QinetiQ and Northrop Grumman proposed outfitting former British Gazelles with autonomous flight management systems derived from the Northrop Grumman MQ-8 Fire Scout, converting them into unmanned aerial vehicles (UAV)s to meet a Royal Navy requirement for an unmanned maritime aerial platform.

== Operational history ==
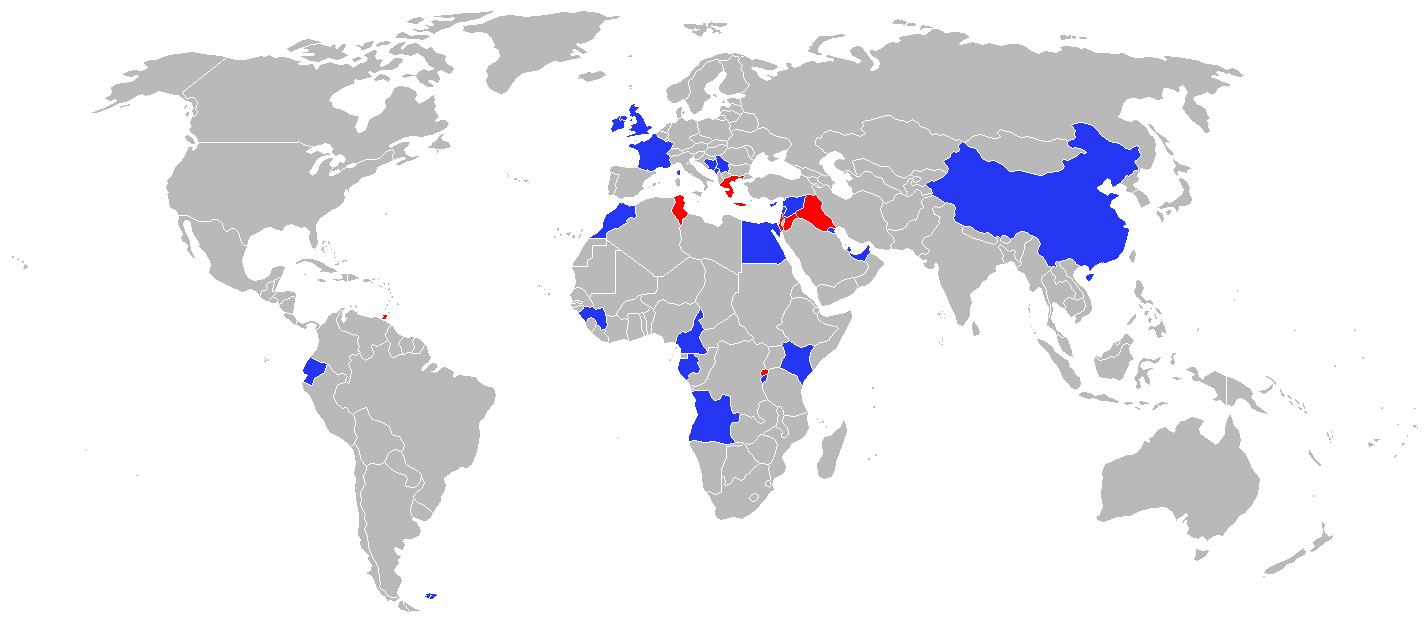
Operators: Current Former

=== China ===
During the 1980s, China acquired eight SA 342L combat helicopters; these were the first dedicated attack helicopters to be operated by the People's Liberation Army. The purchase of further aircraft, including licensed production of the aircraft in China, had been under consideration, but this initiative was apparently abandoned following the end of the Cold War. The small fleet was used to develop anti-armour warfare tactics, Gazelles have also been frequently used to simulate hostile forces during military training exercises.

=== France ===
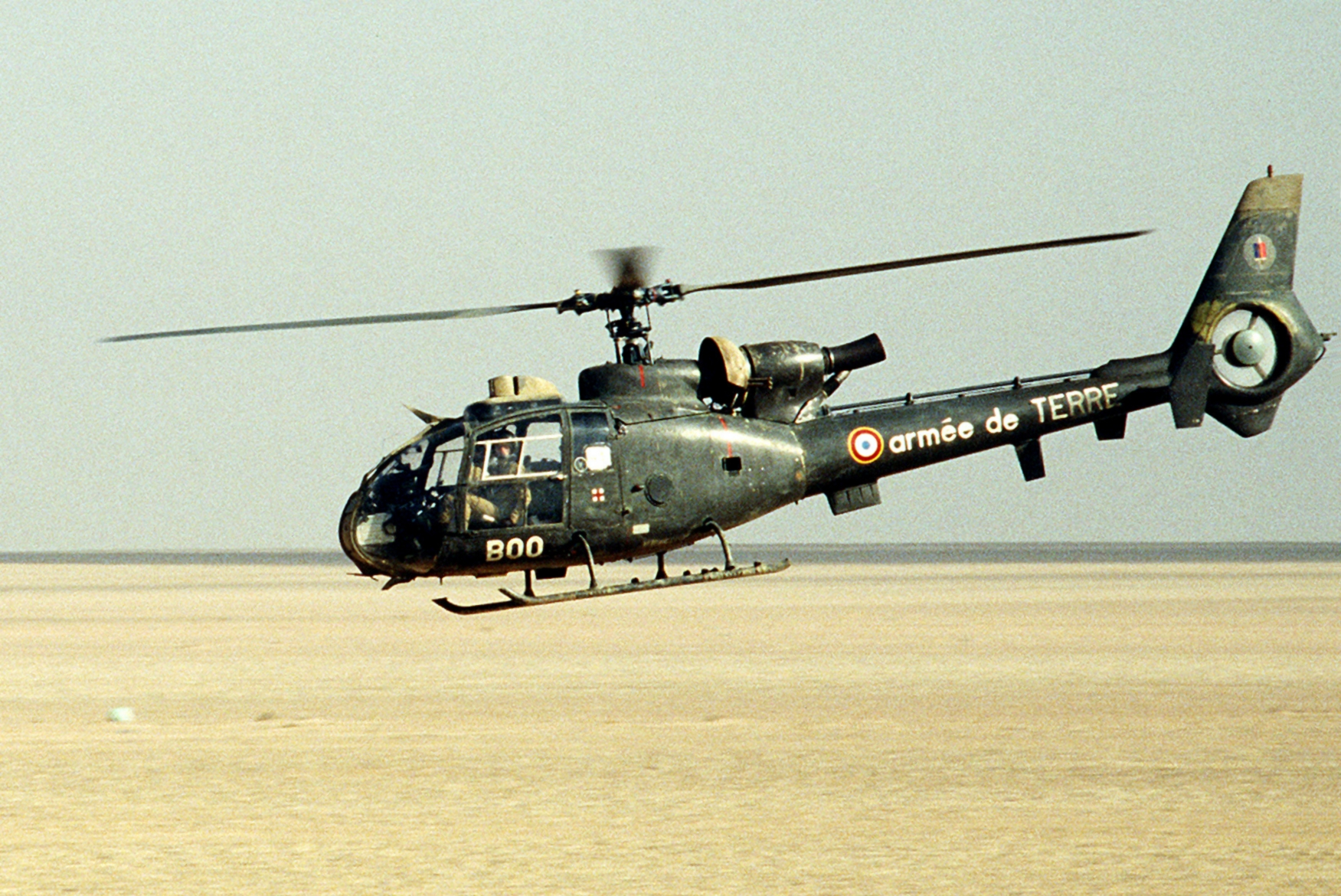
A French SA341F2 Gazelle in the desert during Operation Desert Shield

The French Army has deployed the Gazelle overseas in many large-scale operations, often in support of international military interventions; including in Chad (in the 1980s), the former Yugoslavia (1990s), Djibouti (1991–1992), Somalia (1993), Côte d'Ivoire (2002–present) and Afghanistan (2002–2021). In 1990–1991, upwards of 50 French Gazelles were deployed as part of France's contribution to coalition forces during the First Gulf War.

During the subsequent military action, known as Operation Desert Storm, HOT-carrying Gazelles were employed by several nations' forces, including Kuwait's air force, against Iraqi military forces occupying neighbouring Kuwait. During the coalition's offensive into Kuwait, French Gazelles adopted a tactic of strafing enemy tanks, vehicles, and bunkers in continuous waves at high speed.

Gazelles have often been dispatched to support and protect UN international missions, such as the 1992 intervention in the Bosnian War. In addition to performing land-based operations, French Gazelles have also been frequently deployed from French naval vessels. In April 2008, witnesses reported up to six French Gazelles reportedly firing rockets upon Somali pirates during a major counter-piracy operation. During the 2011 military intervention in Libya, multiple Gazelles were operated from the French Navy's amphibious assault ship Tonnerre; strikes were launched into Libya against pro-Gadhafi military forces.

Military interventions in African nations, particularly former French colonies, have often been supported by Gazelles in both reconnaissance and attack roles; nations involved in previous engagements include Chad, Djibouti, Somalia, and the Côte d'Ivoire. In April 2011, as part of a UN-mandated campaign in Côte d'Ivoire, four Gazelle attack helicopters, accompanied by two Mil Mi-24 gunships, opened fire upon the compound of rebel president Gbagbo to neutralise heavy weaponry, which led to his surrender. In January 2013, Gazelles were used as gunships in the Opération Serval in Mali, performing raids upon insurgent forces fighting government forces in the north of the country.

In 2016 the Direction générale de l'armement announced that Gazelle helicopters of the French Army Aviation's 4th Special Forces Helicopter Regiment (4ème RHFS) could be equipped with the M134 Minigun.

=== Iraq ===
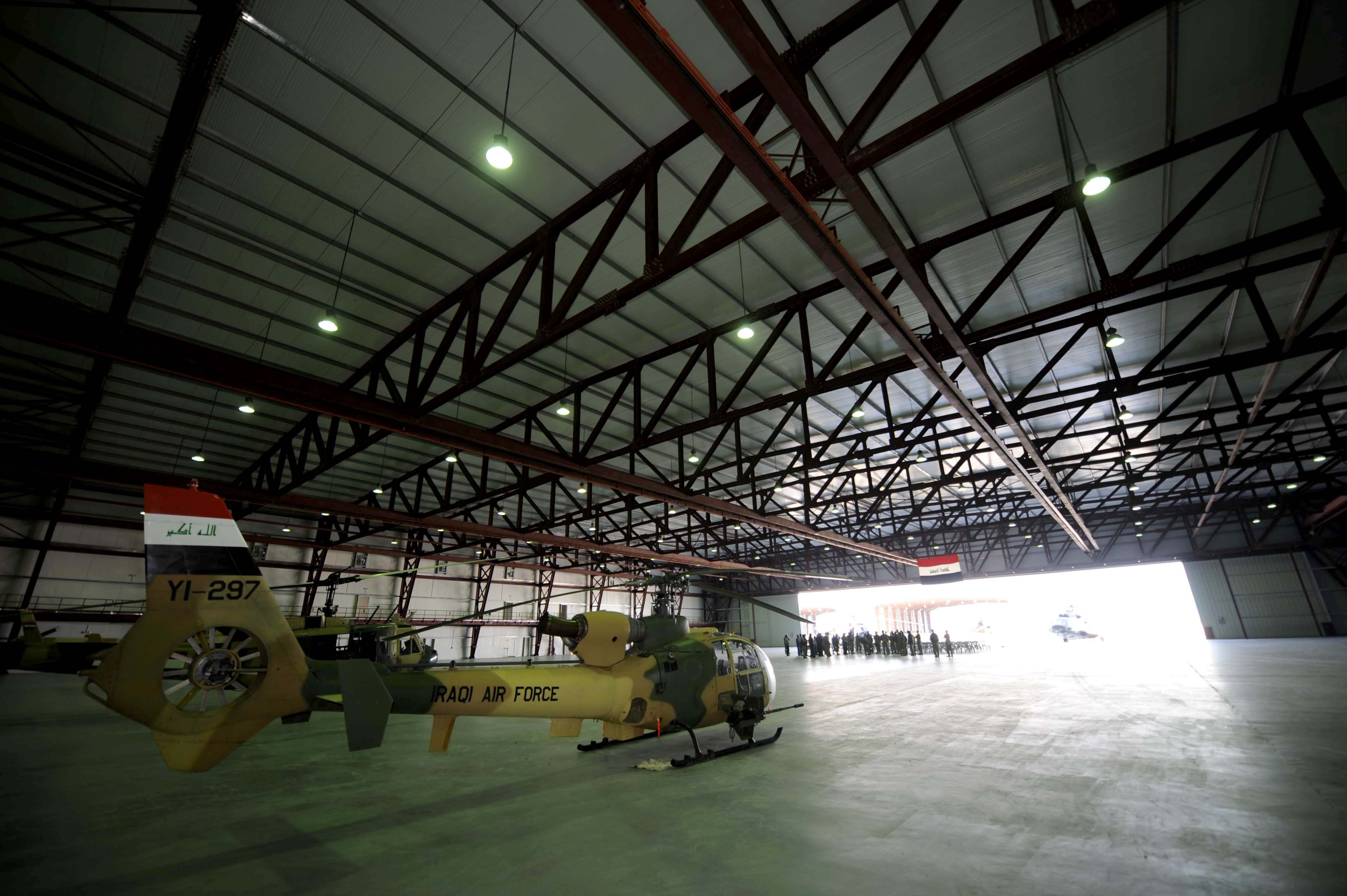
An Iraqi Gazelle in 2011

During the Iran–Iraq War fought throughout most of the 1980s, a significant amount of French-built military equipment was purchased by Iraq, including a fleet of 40 HOT-armed Gazelles. Iraq reportedly received roughly 100 Gazelle helicopters. The Gazelle was commonly used in conjunction with Soviet-built Mil Mi-24 gunships, and were frequently used in counterattacks against Iranian forces. By 2000, following significant equipment losses resulting from the 1991 Gulf War, Iraq reportedly had only 20 Gazelles left in its inventory.

In 2003, US intelligence officials alleged that a French firm had continued to sell spare components for the Gazelle and other French-built aircraft to Iraq via a third-party trading company, despite an embargo being in place. Eurocopter, Aerospatiale's successor company, had denied playing any role, stating in 2008 that "no parts have been delivered to Iraq". In April 2009, Iraq, as part of a larger military procurement initiative, bought six Gazelles from France for training purposes.

=== Syria ===
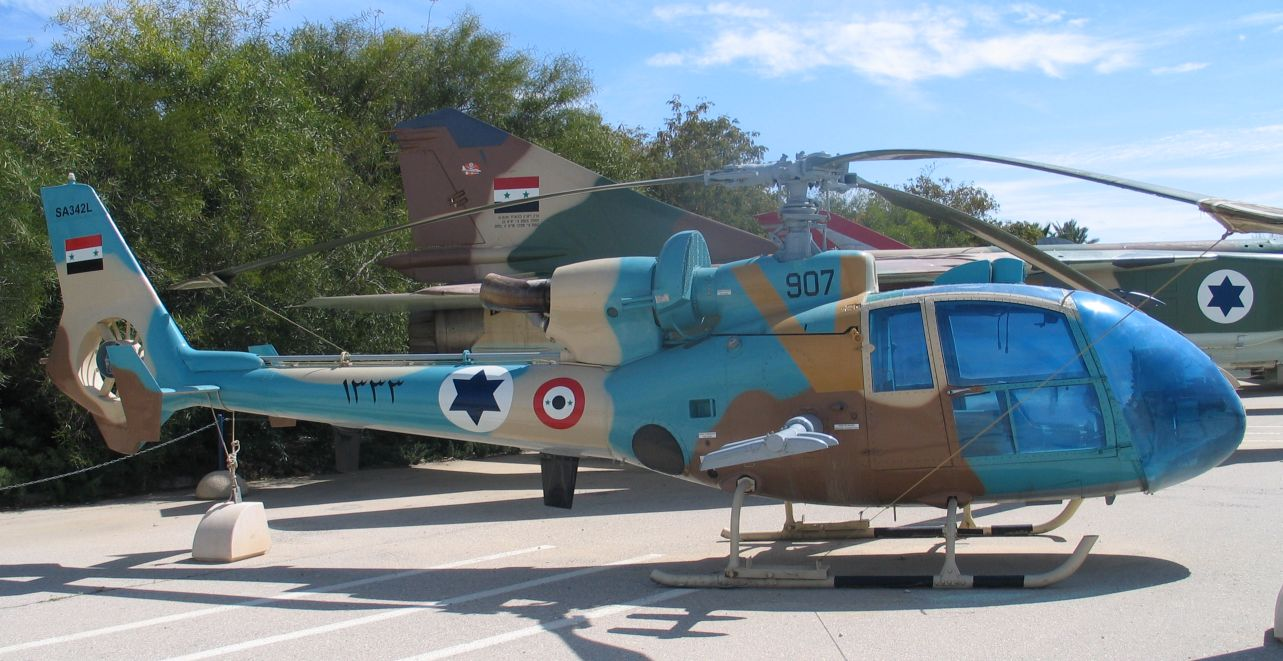
Syrian Air Force Gazelle, captured by Israel in Lebanon in 1982

Syrian Gazelles were used extensively during the 1982 Lebanon War. In the face of a major Israeli ground advance, repetitive harassment attacks were launched by the Gazelles, which were able to slow their advance. According to author Roger Spiller, panic and a sense of vulnerability quickly spread amongst Israeli tank crews following the first of these Gazelle strikes on 8 June 1982; the range of the Gazelle's HOT missiles being a key factor in its effectiveness. The effectiveness of the Syrian helicopter raids was reduced throughout the month of June as Syrian air defenses were progressively eroded and the Israeli Air Force took aerial supremacy over Eastern Lebanon, thus making operations by attack helicopters increasingly vulnerable. However, Gazelle strikes continued to be successfully performed up to the issuing of a ceasefire.

The 1982 war served to highlight the importance and role of attack helicopters in future conflicts due to their performance on both sides of the conflict. Following the end of the war, the Syrian Army would claim that significant damage had been delivered against Israeli forces, such as the destruction of 30 tanks and 50 other vehicles, against the loss of five helicopters. Israel would claim a loss of seven tanks to the Gazelle strikes and the downing of 12 Syrian Gazelles. Author Kenneth Michael Pollack described the role of Syria's Gazelle helicopters as being "psychologically effective against the Israelis but did little actual damage. Although they employed good Western-style 'pop-up' tactics, the Gazelles were not able to manage more than a few armor kills during the war".

Following the end of the war, Syria increased the size of its attack helicopter fleet from 16 to 50 Gazelles, complemented by a further 50 heavier Mil Mi-24 gunships. Gazelles were also used several times in Syria during its civil war, most recently being seen supporting troops in the Palmyra Offensive using unguided missiles and HOT ATGMs.

=== Kuwait ===
During the 1991 Gulf War, roughly 15 Gazelles were able to retreat into neighbouring Saudi Arabia, along with other elements of Kuwait's armed forces, during the invasion of the nation by Iraq. During the subsequent coalition offensive to dislodge Iraqi forces from Kuwait, several of the escaped Kuwaiti Gazelles launched attack missions into occupied Kuwait to destroy Iraqi tanks and other, military targets.

=== Ecuador ===
The Gazelle was used by the Ecuadoran Army during the 1995 Cenepa war between Ecuador and neighboring Peru, performing missions such as close air support and escorting other helicopters. In 2008, a minor diplomatic spat broke out between Colombia and Ecuador following a reportedly accidental incursion into Colombian airspace by an Ecuadoran Gazelle.

=== United Kingdom ===
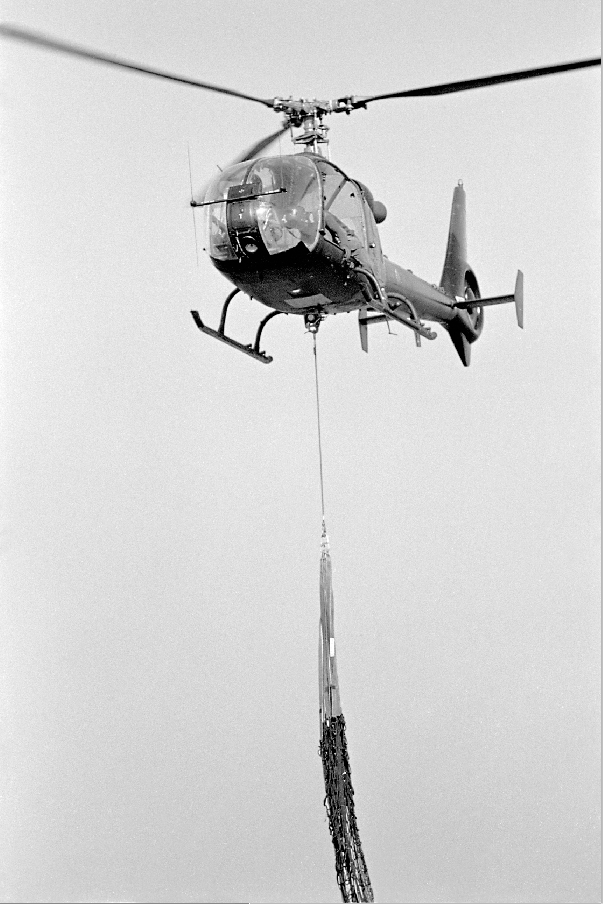
A Gazelle of 1 Reg AAC, Hildesheim, Germany with underslung cargo net in 1980.

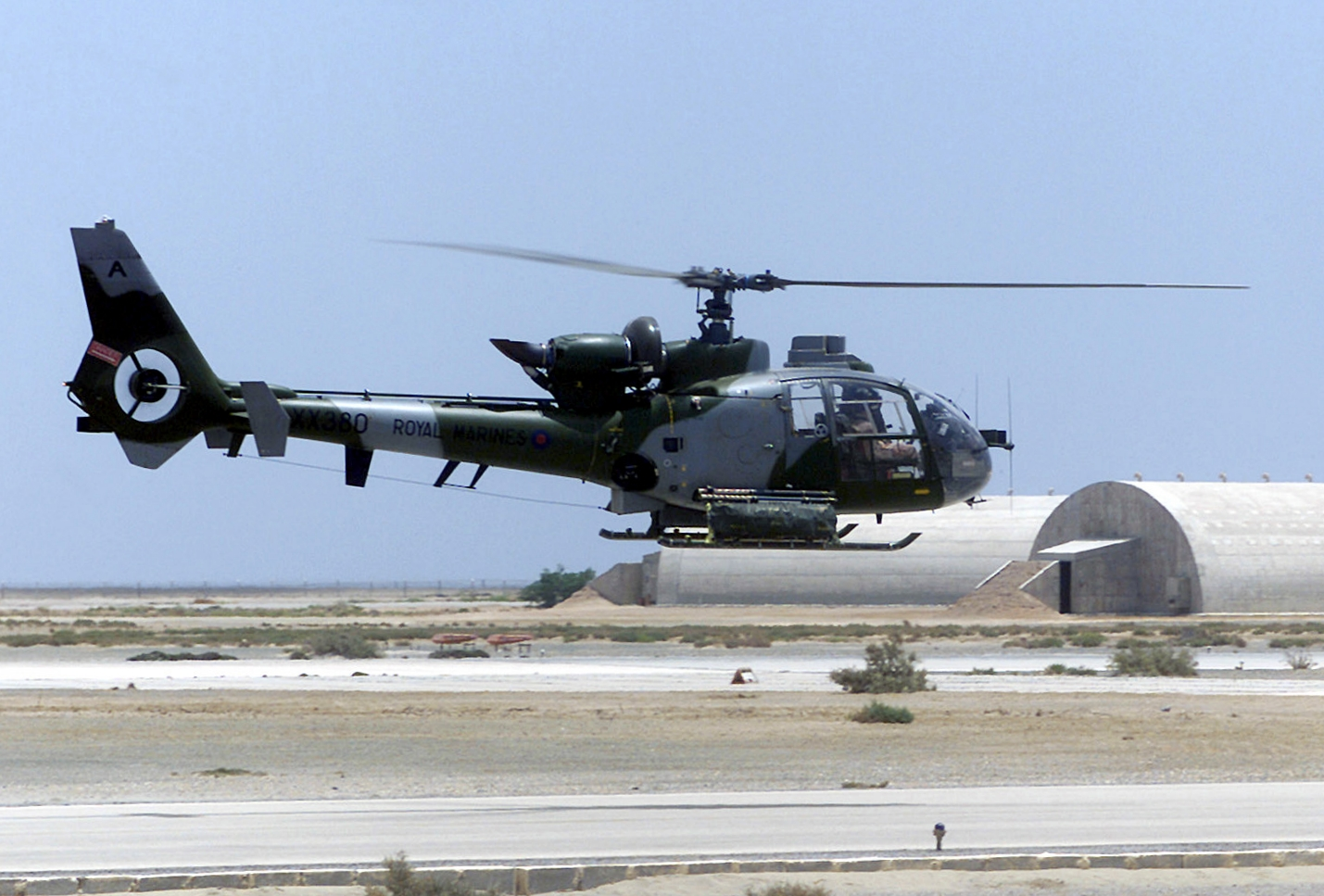
Royal Marines AH1 Gazelle takes off from Masirah, Oman in 2002

In 1973, 142 aircraft were on order by the UK, out of a then-intended fleet of 250. No. 660 Squadron AAC, based in Salamanca Barracks, Germany, was the first British Army unit to be equipped with Gazelles, entering operational service on 6 July 1974. The Gazelles, replacements for the Sioux, were assigned the roles of reconnaissance, troop deployment, direction of artillery fire, casualty evacuation and anti-tank operations. In August 1974, 30 were based at RAF Ternhill for RAF helicopter training.

The Royal Navy's Gazelles entered service in December 1974 with 705 Naval Air Squadron, Culdrose, to provide all-through flying training in preparation for the Westland Lynx's service entry. A total of 23 Gazelles were ordered for Culdrose. Army-owned AH.1s also entered service with 3 Commando Brigade Air Squadron (3 CBAS) of the Royal Marines and later, the Commando Helicopter Force (CHF) of the Fleet Air Arm, where they operated as utility and reconnaissance helicopters in support of the Royal Marines. The 12 Gazelles for 3 CBAS had entered service in 1975, by which time, there were 310 Gazelles on order for the British military.

Gazelles that had replaced the Sioux in RAF Sek Kong towards the end of 1974(?) had been found unsuitable for Hong Kong and, by the end of 1978, had been returned to the UK and they were replaced by the Scout AH1. During its Cold War service period, the Army Gazelles flew over 660,000 hours and had over 1,000 modifications made to the aircraft. From the early 1980s, Army-operated Gazelles were fitted with the Gazelle Observation Aid, a gyro-stabilised sight to match their target finding capability with that of the Lynx. The type also had a limited, special operations aviation role with 8 Flight Army Air Corps

The type was also frequently used to perform airborne patrols in Northern Ireland. On 17 February 1978, a British Army Gazelle crashed near Jonesborough, County Armagh, after coming under fire from the Provisional IRA during a ground skirmish.

During the Falklands War, the Gazelle played a valuable role operating from the flight decks of Royal Navy ships. Under a rapidly performed crash programme specifically for the Falklands conflict, Gazelles were fitted with 68mm SNEB rocket pods and various other optional equipment such as armour plating, flotation gear and folding blade mechanisms. Two Royal Marines Gazelles were shot down on the first day of the landings at San Carlos Water. In a high-profile incident on 6 June 1982, an Army Air Corps Gazelle was mistaken for a low-flying Argentine Lockheed C-130 Hercules and was shot down by HMS Cardiff, a British Type 42 destroyer.

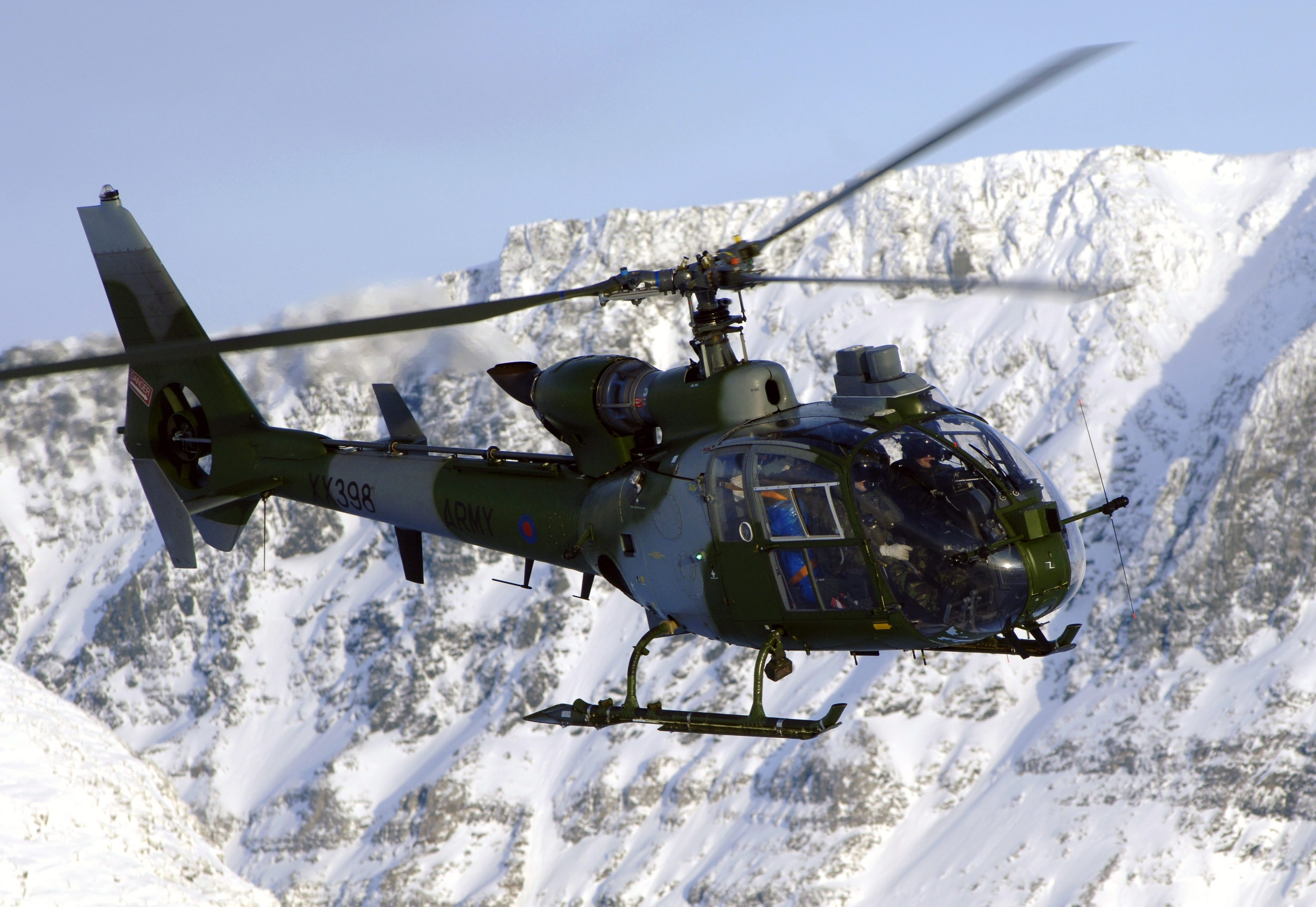
Army Air Corps Gazelle on exercises in Norway, 2006

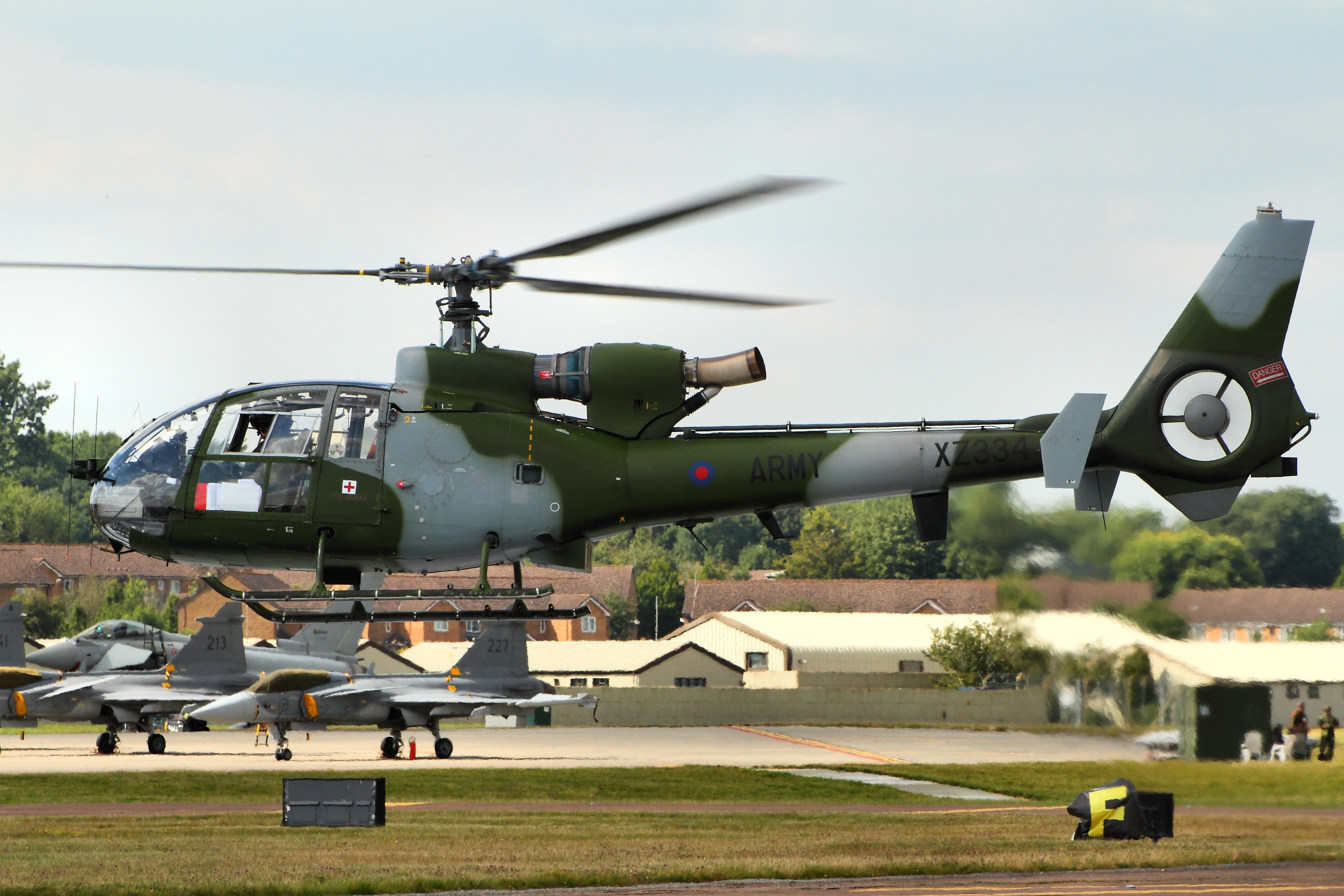
A British Army Gazelle at RIAT in 2014

The Gazelle also operated in reconnaissance and liaison roles during the War in Afghanistan. In 2007, it was reported that, while many British helicopters had struggled with the conditions of the Afghan and Iraqi theatres, the Gazelle was the "best performing model" with roughly 80% being available for planned operations.

Various branches of the British military have operated Gazelles in other theatres, such as during the 1991 Gulf War against Iraq and in the 1999 intervention in Kosovo. In 2009, the Army Air Corps was the sole operator of the Gazelle with approximately 40 in service with a planned out of service date in 2012. In October 2009, it was announced that the out of service date had been extended to support domestic commitments including to the Police Service of Northern Ireland (PSNI) until 2018 at which point the PSNI was to have their own assets.

In July 2016, the Ministry of Defence announced that the Gazelle would remain in service until 2025 taking the Gazelle past its 50th anniversary in UK military service and making it the oldest helicopter in active UK inventory. At this time, the Gazelle was operated by 29 (BATUS) Flight AAC in Canada supporting British Army Training Unit Suffield; 665 Squadron AAC in Northern Ireland with aerial surveillance tasks; and at the Army Aviation Centre by 7 (Training) Regiment AAC Conversion Flight and 667 (Development & Trials) Squadron AAC. In 2018 and 2019, the Ministry of Defence awarded contracts to sustain the fleet until 2022 with the option of an extension in 2025. In 2019, the Army Air Corps had a fleet of 32 Gazelles with 19 in service.

It was announced in January 2022 that the rest of the British Army's Gazelles will be phased out by March 2024 to be replaced by Airbus Helicopters H135.

It was further announced that the Gazelle would be retired from service on 31 October 2023. The Army Air Corps made a farewell flypast from Flying Station Aldergrove in Northern Ireland to Vector Aerospace International Ltd in Gosport, flying over various British Army and RAF bases, on 23 October.

=== Yugoslavia ===
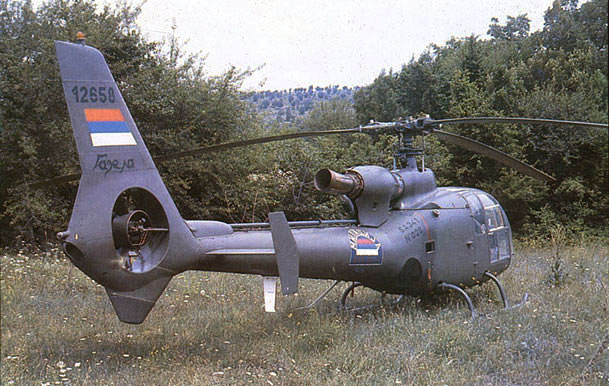
Krajina Air Force Gazelle

On 27 June 1991, during the Ten Day War in Slovenia, a Yugoslav Air Force Gazelle helicopter was shot down by a man-portable 9K32 Strela-2 surface-to-air missile over Ljubljana, the first aircraft to be lost during the breakup of Yugoslavia. The Gazelles would see further action in the subsequent Yugoslav Wars, particularly in Bosnia where Republika Srpska Air Force conducted many operations with only five Gazelles lost, and the Kosovo War; as Yugoslavia dissolved, the various successor states would inherit the SOKO-built Gazelles and continue to operate them, such as the Armed Forces of Bosnia and Herzegovina, Serbian Air Force and Montenegro Air Force.

=== Lebanon ===
Between 1980 and 1981, the Lebanese Air Force received from France ten SA 342K/L and SA 341H Gazelles equipped for anti-tank and utility roles, respectively, to equip its newly raised 8th attack squadron at Beirut Air Base. Initially based at the latter location, in 1983 the squadron was relocated north of the Lebanese capital, with the Gazelles being dispersed in small improvised helipads around Jounieh and Adma for security reasons, where one of the helicopters may have been damaged in a failed takeoff.

In 1988, a Lebanese Air Force pilot, the Druze Lieutenant Majed Karameh, defected from Adma airfield and flew a SA 342K attack helicopter to the Druze-controlled Chouf District, where it was impounded by the Druze People's Liberation Army (PLA) militia upon landing and transported by a PLA MAZ-537G tank transporter to the Saïd el-Khateeb Barracks at Hammana in the Baabda District. This particular helicopter appears to have never been used in combat by the PLA (since they had no aviation component, and therefore lacked the technically proficient personnel to help fly and maintain the captured airframe), which ended up being simply placed on storage at Hammana under the custody of the Druze 11th Infantry Brigade for the remainder of the Civil War.

Employed extensively in the gunship role by providing close air support to General Michel Aoun's troops during the final phase of the Lebanese Civil War, combat losses and maintenance problems reduced the Gazelle fleet to just four operational helicopters by 1990, with three of the machines reportedly being apprehended by the Lebanese Forces militia who illegally sold them to Serbia in 1991.

After the conflict, the Lebanese Air Force Command made consistent efforts to rebuild its attack helicopter squadron with the help of the United Arab Emirates and nine SA 342L Gazelles formerly in service with the United Arab Emirates Air Force were delivered in 2007. Due to budgetary constraints, the majority of the Gazelles operated by the Lebanese Air Force have often been kept in storage outside of times of conflict.

The Gazelles saw combat against the Al Qaeda-inspired Fatah al-Islam militants during the 2007 Lebanon conflict. Rocket-armed Gazelles were used to strike insurgent bunkers during the brief conflict. In 2010, a French government official stated that France had offered to provide up to 100 HOT missiles to Lebanon for the Gazelle helicopters. According to reports, France may also provide additional Gazelles to Lebanon.

=== Morocco ===
In January 1981, France and Morocco entered into a $4 billion military procurement deal in which, amongst other vehicles and equipment, 24 Gazelle helicopters were to be delivered to Morocco. The Royal Moroccan Air Force operated these Gazelles, which were equipped with a mix of anti-tank missiles and other ground attack munitions, and made frequent use of the aircraft during battles with Polisario insurgents in the western Sahara region. The reconnaissance capabilities of the Gazelle were instrumental in finding and launching attacks upon insurgent camps due to their mobility.

=== Rwanda ===
In 1990, following appeals from Rwandan President Juvénal Habyarimana for French support in interethnic conflict against the Tutsi Rwandan Patriotic Front (RPF), nine armed Gazelles were exported to Rwanda in 1992. The Gazelles would see considerable use in the conflict that became known as the Rwandan Civil War, capable of strafing enemy positions as well as performing reconnaissance patrols of Northern Rwanda; in October 1992, a single Gazelle destroyed a column of ten RPF units. According to author Andrew Wallis, the Gazelle gunships helped to stop significant RPF advances and led to a major change in RPF tactics towards guerrilla warfare. In 1994, French forces dispatched as a part of Opération Turquoise, a United Nations-mandated intervention in the conflict, also operated a number of Gazelles in the theatre.

=== Egypt ===
As part of a major international initiative formalised in 1975 to build up Arab military industries, Egypt commenced widescale efforts to replace arms imports with domestic production to provide military equipment to the rest of the Middle East, other Arab partner nations included Saudi Arabia, the United Arab Emirates, and Qatar. Both France and Britain would form large agreements with Egypt; in March 1978, the Arab British Helicopter Company (ABHCO) was formally established in a $595 million deal with Westland Helicopters, initially for the purpose of domestically assembly of British Westland Lynx helicopters. An initial order for 42 Gazelles was placed in mid-1975. In the 1980s, ABHCO performed the assembly of 100 Gazelles; the British Arab Engine Company also produced engines for Egyptian-build Gazelles.

=== Mozambique ===
In 2021, three Gazelle helicopters played a significant role in the Battle of Palma, providing air support at the behest of the Mozambique security forces battling the insurgents and evacuating civilians and contractors from the besieged town.

== Variants ==
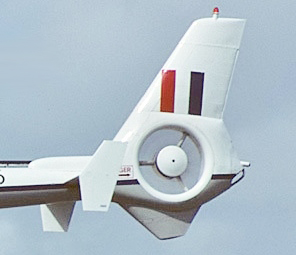
Fenestron tail rotor of a Gazelle

SA 340
First prototype, first flown on 7 April 1967 with a conventional Alouette type tail rotor.
SA 341
Four pre-production machines. First flown on 2 August 1968. The third was equipped to British Army requirements and assembled in France as the prototype Gazelle AH.1. This was first flown on 28 April 1970.
SA 341.1001
First French production machine. Initial test flight 6 August 1971. Featured a longer cabin, an enlarged tail unit and an uprated Turbomeca Astazou IIIA engine.
SA 341B (Westland Gazelle AH.1)
Version built for the British Army; Featured the Astazou IIIN2 engine, capable of operating a nightsun searchlight, later fitted with radio location via ARC 340 radio and modified to fire 68mm SNEB rockets. First Westland-assembled version flown on 31 January 1972, this variant entered service on 6 July 1974. A total of 158 were produced. A small number were also operated by the Fleet Air Arm in support of the Royal Marines.
SA 341C (Westland Gazelle HT.2)
Training helicopter version built for British Fleet Air Arm; Features included the Astazou IIIN2 engine, a stability augmentation system and a hoist. First flown on 6 July 1972, this variant entered operational service on 10 December 1974. A total of 30 were produced.
SA 341D (Westland Gazelle HT.3)
Training helicopter version built for British Royal Air Force; Featuring the same engine and stability system as the 341C, this version was first delivered on 16 July 1973. A total of 14 were produced. Retired from RAF on 31 August 1997.
SA 341E (Westland Gazelle HCC.4)
Communications helicopter version built for British Royal Air Force; Only one example of this variant was produced.
SA 341F
Version built for the French Army; Featuring the Astazou IIIC engine, 166 of these were produced. Some of these were fitted with an M621 20-mm cannon.
SA 341G
Civil variant, powered by an Astazou IIIA engine. Officially certificated on 7 June 1972; subsequently became first helicopter to obtain single-pilot IFR Cat 1 approval in the US. Also developed into "Stretched Gazelle" with the cabin modified to allow an additional 8 inches (20 cm) legroom for the rear passengers.
SA 341H
Military export variant, powered by an Astazou IIIB engine. Built under licence agreement signed on 1 October 1971 by SOKO in Yugoslavia.

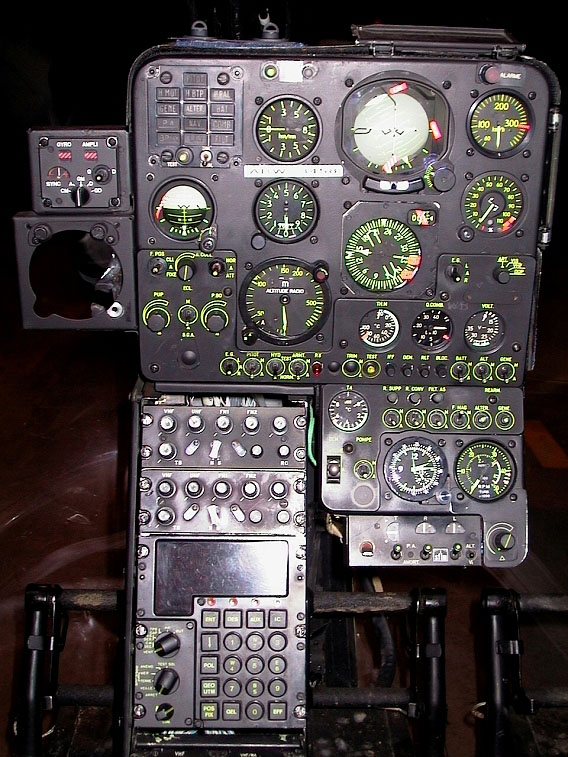
Control panel of a SA 342M Gazelle

SOKO HO-42
Yugoslav-built version of SA 341H.
SOKO HI-42 Hera
Yugoslav-built scout version of SA 341H.
SOKO HS-42
Yugoslav-built medic version of SA 341H.
SOKO HN-42M Gama.
Yugoslav-built attack version of SA 341H. The name is derived from the abbreviation of Gazelle and Malyutka anti-tank missile, Soviet-designed, but locally produced variant of the missile.
SOKO HN-45M Gama 2
Yugoslav-built attack version of SA 342L.

SA 342J
Civil version of SA 342L. This was fitted with the more powerful 649 kW (870 shp) Astazou XIV engine and an improved Fenestron tail rotor. With an increased take-off weight, this variant was approved on 24 April 1976, and entered service in 1977.
SA 342K
Military export version for "hot and dry areas". Fitted with the more powerful 649-kW (870-shp) Astazou XIV engine and shrouds over the air intakes. First flown on 11 May 1973; initially sold to Kuwait.
SA 342L
Military companion of the SA 342J. fitted with the Astazou XIV engine. Adaptable for many armaments and equipment, including six Euromissile HOT anti-tank missiles.

HOT anti-tank guided missiles on a SA 342 Gazelle helicopter of the Cyprus National Guard.

SA 342M

French Army anti-tank version fitted with the Astazou XIV engine. Armed with four Euromissile HOT missiles and a SFIM APX M397 stabilised sight.
SA 342M1
SA 342M retrofitted with three Ecureuil main blades to improve performance.
SA 349
Experimental aircraft, outfitted with stub wings.

== Operators ==
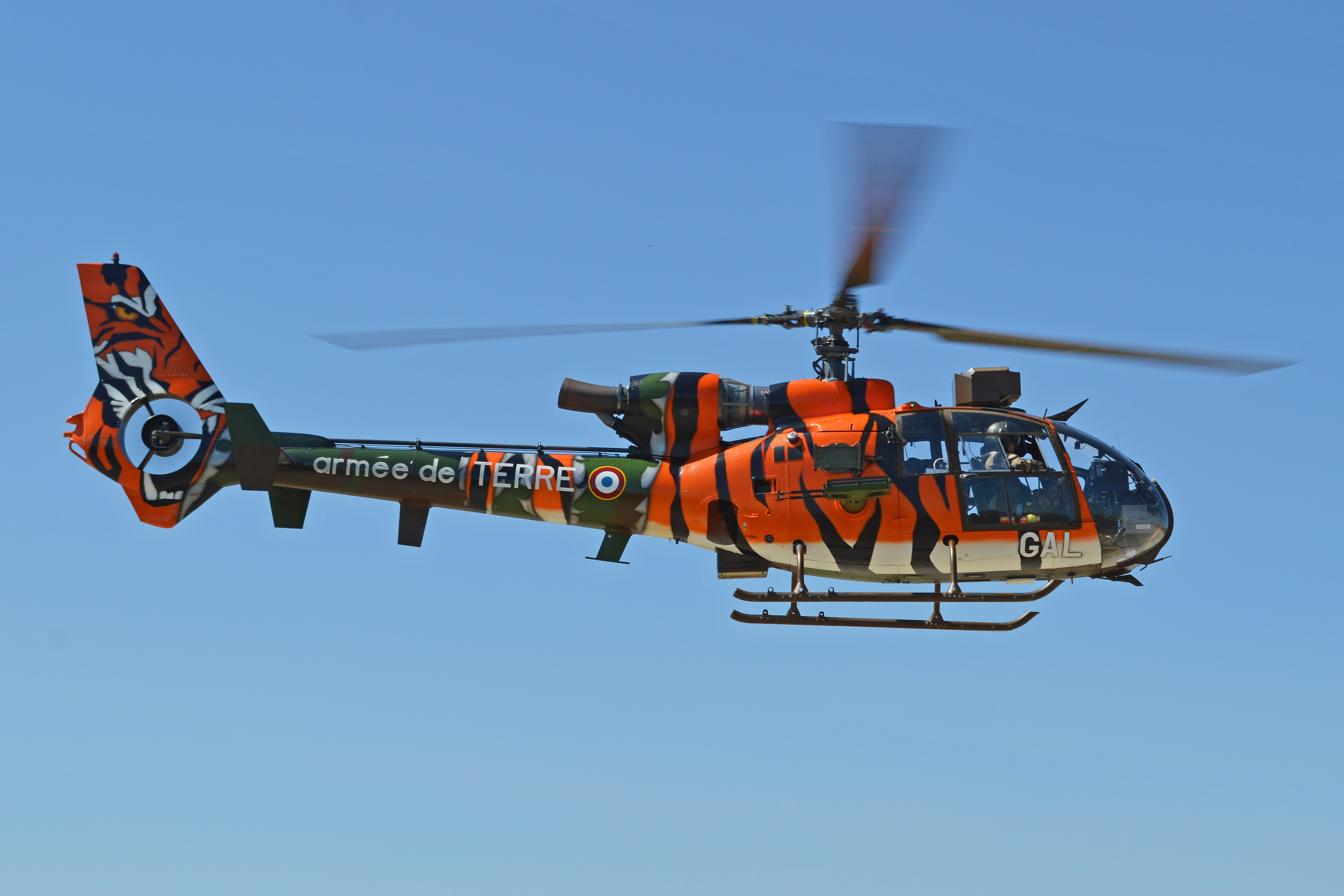
A French Army Gazelle seen during the NATO Tiger Meet 2016 in Spain.

- Angola
  - Angolan Air Force
    - 21st Transportation Helicopter Regiment – 1st Helicopter Squadron
    - 22nd Combat Helicopter Regiment – 3rd Helicopter Squadron
- Bosnia and Herzegovina:
  - Bosnian and Herzegovinian Air Force
- Burundi
  - Burundi Army
- Cameroon
  - Cameroon Air Force
    - Two SA342L helicopters (reg. TJ-XBE and TJ-XBF)
- Central African Republic
  - Central African Republic Air Force
    - Two ex-Yugoslavian SA341G helicopters (reg. TL-WJU and TL-WJV) operating for the Wagner Group in CAR
- Cyprus
  - Cyprus Air Forces
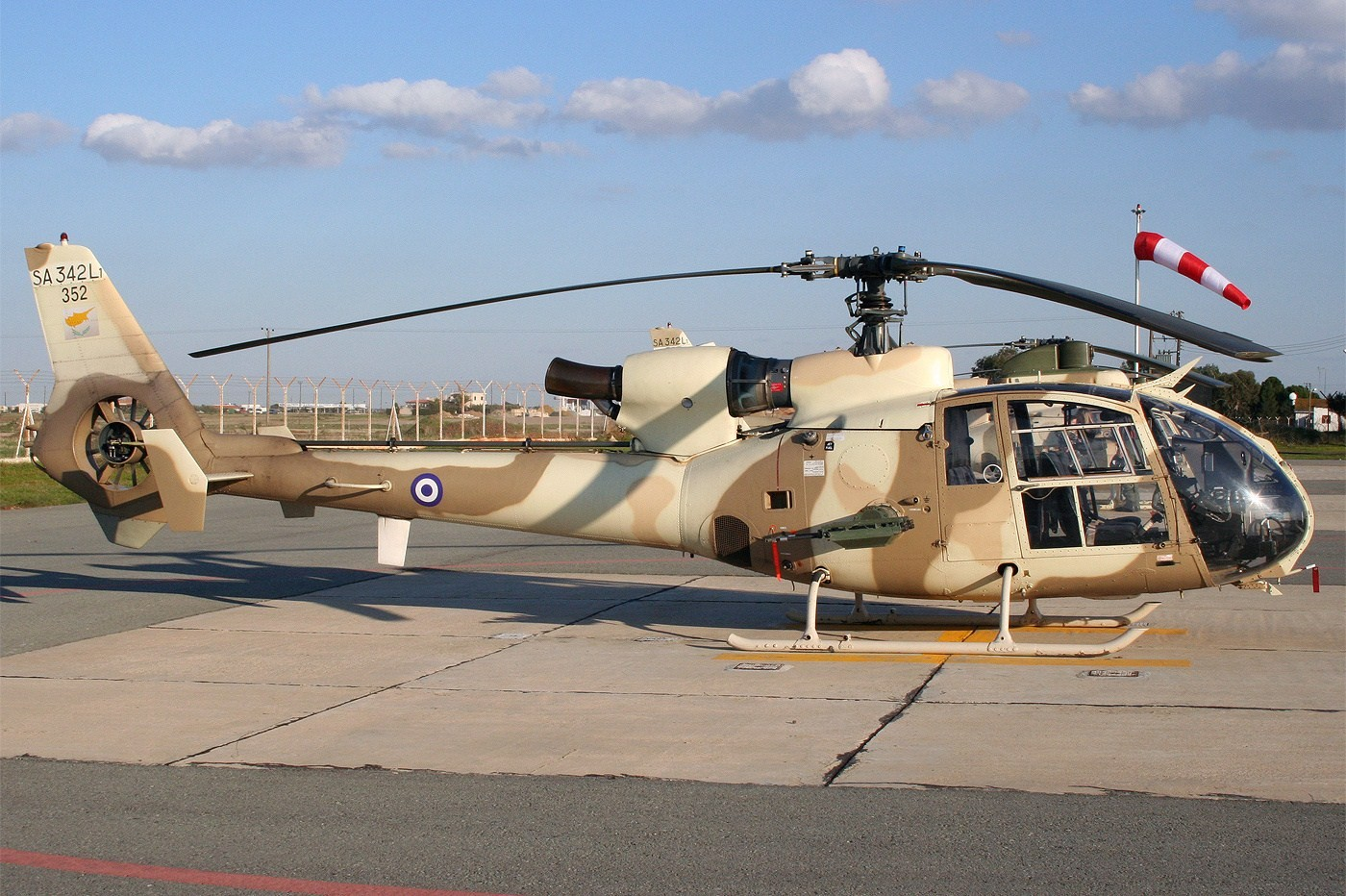
    A Gazelle of the Cyprus air command
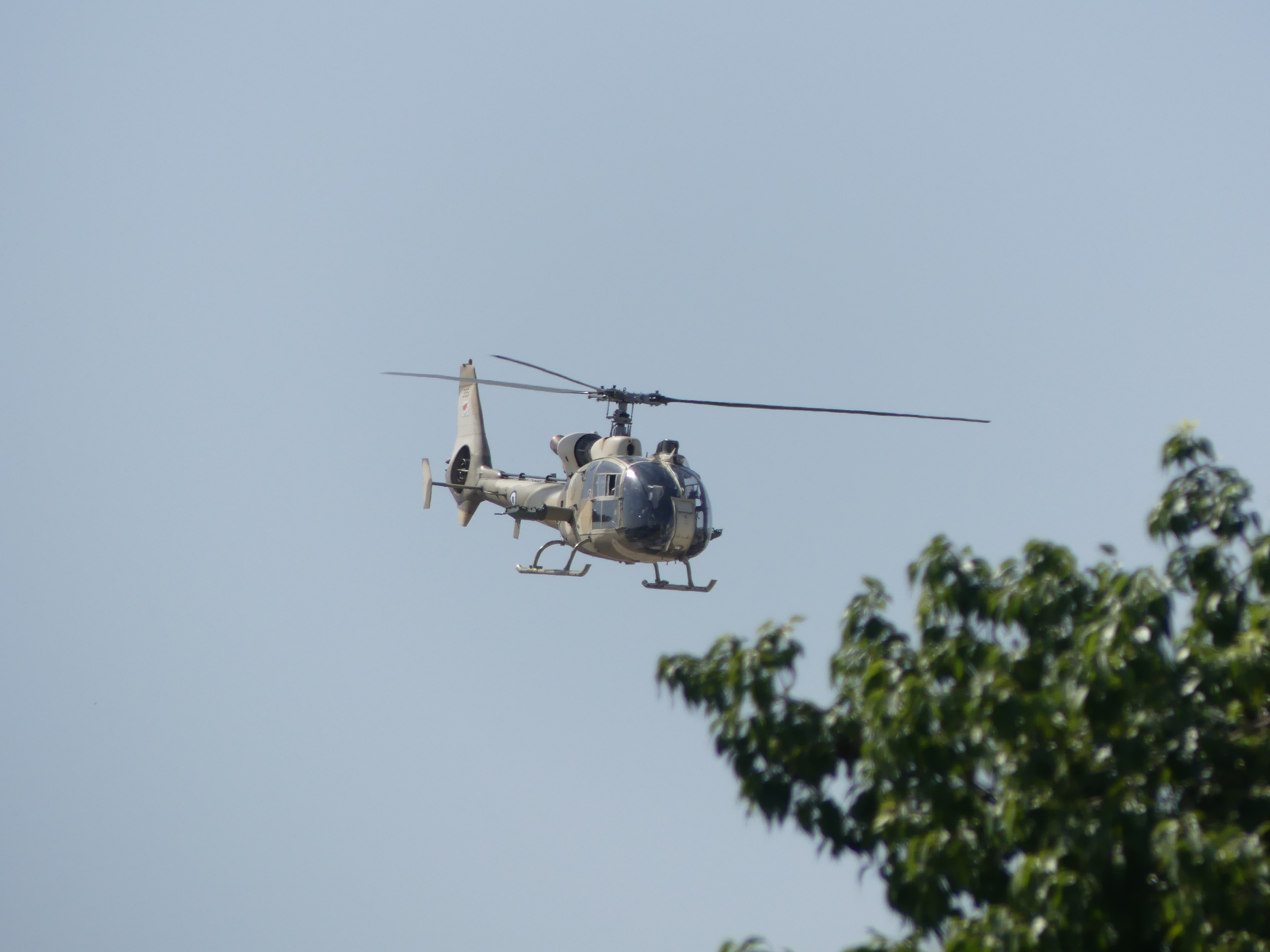
    A Cypriot Gazelle anti-tank helicopter flying during a parade
- Egypt
  - Egyptian Air Force
    - 548 Air Wing 10, 15 and 17 Squadrons at Abu Sultan
    - 301 Air Wing 30, 56 squadrons at Kibrit, 54 squadron at Bilbeis
- Eswatini
  - Umbutfo Eswatini Defence Force
    - A single Gazelle AH.1 acquired in 2006 (reg. 3DC-HGZ)
- France
  - French Army
- Gabon
  - Gabon Air Force
- Iraq
  - Iraqi Air Force
- Kuwait
  - Kuwait Air Force
- Lebanon
  - Lebanese Air Force
- Malawi
  - Malawian Defence Force
    - Two Gazelles (reg. MDFAW-H20 and MDFAW-H21) seen active in 2016
- Morocco
  - Royal Moroccan Air Force
- Niger
  - Niger Air Force: received three refurbished SA342L-1s from France in 2013.
- Puntland State of Somalia
  - Puntland Air Force
- Qatar
  - Qatar Emiri Air Force
- Rwanda
  - Rwandan Air Force
- Serbia
  - Serbian Air Force
  - Police of Serbia
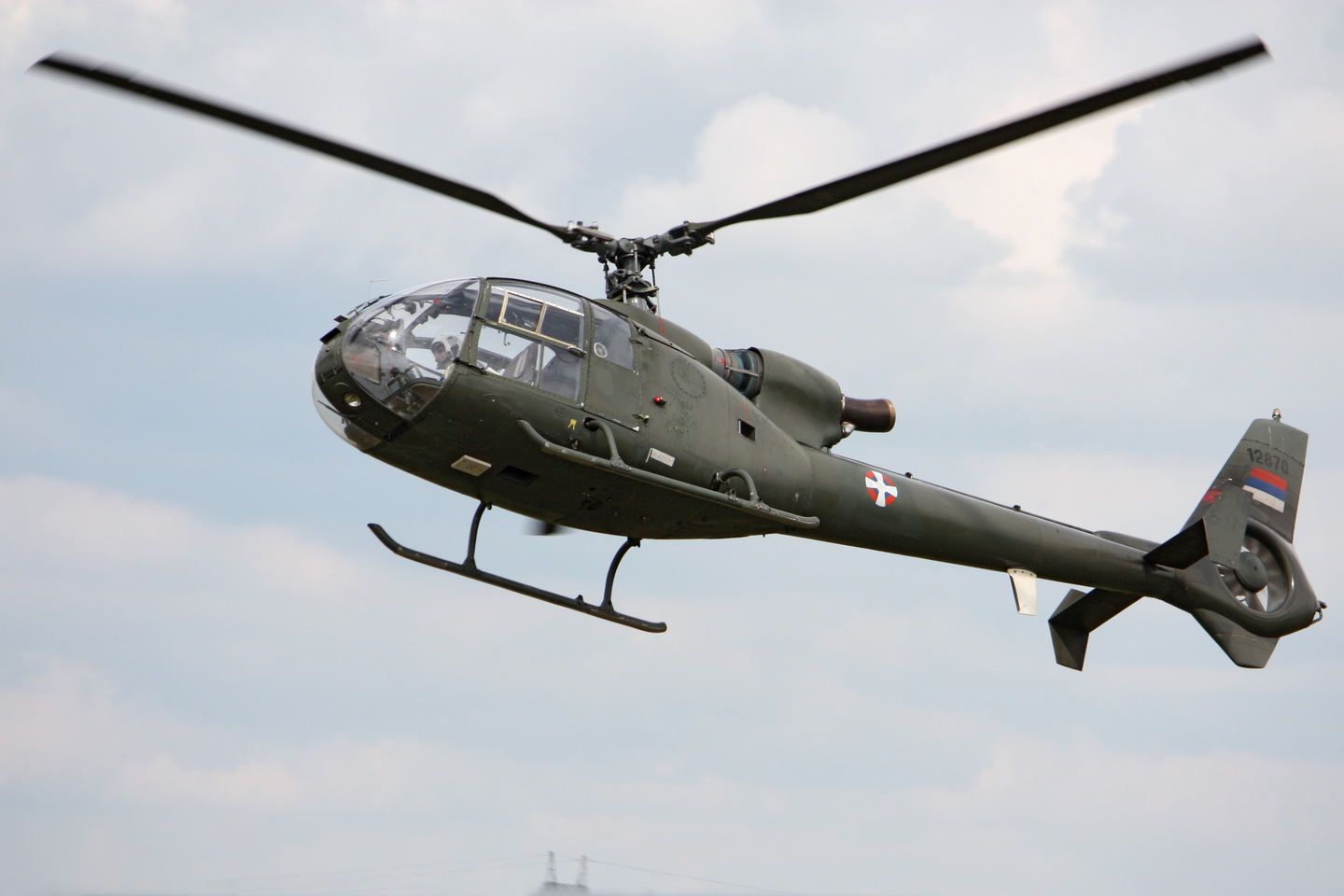
    Serbian Air Force Gazelle
- Tunisia
  - Tunisian Air Force

=== Retired ===
- Chad
  - Chadian Air Force
    - Two SA341G helicopters acquired in 1974 (reg. TT-OAF and TT-OAG), returned to SNIAS in 1976
- China
  - People's Liberation Army
- Ecuador
  - Ecuadorian Army Retired 20 January 2025.
- Ireland
  - Irish Air Corps
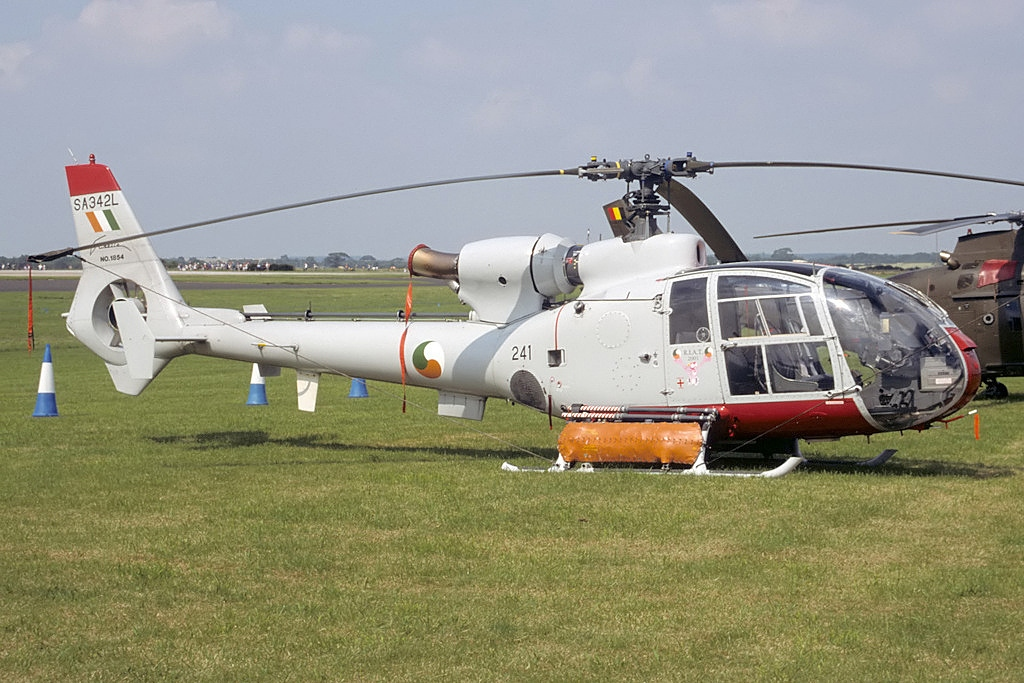
    An Irish Air Corps Gazelle of 3 Support Wing based at Baldonnel
- Bosnia and Herzegovina
  - Republika Srpska Air Force
- Montenegro
  - Montenegrin Air Force
- Syria
  - Syrian Arab Air Force. The Syrian government of Al-Assad fell to rebels in late 2024, and the Syrian Arab Air Force was dismantled. It was re-established as Syrian Air Force, but the revolution, and the Israeli air strikes that followed it, wrecked havoc in the inventory of the Air Force. In late 2025, the World Air Forces publication by FlightGlobal, which tracks the aircraft inventories of world's air forces and publishes its counts annually, removed all Syrian Air Force's aircraft from their World Air Forces 2026 report. It is thus questionable if the Syrian Air Force has any flying aircraft in their inventory, and in particular, any Aérospatiale Gazelle, as of December 2025.
- United Kingdom

Active from 1971 to 2023.

  - Royal Air Force
  - Royal Navy
  - Army Air Corps
- Yugoslavia
  - Yugoslav Air Force
    - Reconnaissance and Liaison Squadron (EIV) First Military Region (Batajnica Airbase, Belgrade)
    - Reconnaissance and Liaison Squadron (EIV) Third Military Region (Skopski Petrovac, Skopje)
    - Reconnaissance and Liaison Squadron (EIV) Fifth Military Region (Pleso, Zagreb)
    - Reconnaissance and Liaison Squadron (EIV) Naval Military Region (Divulje, Split)

== Specifications (SA 341G) ==

External videos
- In-cockpit footage of Gazelle flight
- Blue Eagles display team of the Army Air Corps performing aerobatic maneuvers

Data from Jane's all the World's Aircraft 1978–79

General characteristics

- Crew: 1 or 2
- Capacity: up to 3 or 4 passengers
- Length: 11.97 m (39 ft 3 in) including rotor
- Height: 3.15 m (10 ft 4 in) overall; 2.72 m (8 ft 11 in) to top of rotor hub
- Empty weight: 917 kg (2,022 lb)
- Max takeoff weight: 1,800 kg (3,968 lb)
- Fuel capacity: 735 L (194 US gal; 162 imp gal)
- Oil: 13 L (3.4 US gal; 2.9 imp gal) for engine, 3.5 L (0.92 US gal; 0.77 imp gal) for gearbox
- Powerplant: 1 × Turbomeca Astazou IIIA turboshaft, 440 kW (590 hp)
- Main rotor diameter: 10.5 m (34 ft 5 in)
- Main rotor area: 86.5 m^{2} (931 sq ft) NACA 0012 section

Performance

- Maximum speed: 310 km/h (190 mph, 170 kn) at sea level
- Cruise speed: 264 km/h (164 mph, 143 kn) max cruise at sea level
- Economical cruise speed: 233 km/h (145 mph; 126 kn)
- Range: 361 km (224 mi, 195 nmi) at sea level with maximum fuel
- Range with pilot and 500 kg (1,100 lb): 233 km (145 mi; 126 nmi)
- Service ceiling: 5,000 m (16,000 ft)
- Hover ceiling IGE: 2,850 m (9,350 ft)
- Hover ceiling OGE: 2,000 m (6,600 ft)
- Rate of climb: 9 m/s (1,800 ft/min) max at sea level
- Disk loading: 19.5 kg/m^{2} (4.0 lb/sq ft)

Armament

- Guns: Two forward-firing 7.62 mm (0.300 in) machine-guns (optional)
- Rockets: Matra or Brandt 70 mm (2.75 in) or 68 mm (2.68 in) rocket pods (optional)
- Missiles: Four AS.11 or two AS.12 wire-guided missiles; four or six Euromissile HOT (optional)

Avionics

- UHF, VHF, and HF radios; navigation equipment such as VOR and TACAN; Standard blind flying instruments

== Aircraft on display ==
There are a large number of Gazelles preserved. In the UK, the following Gazelles are in preservation, either in museums or as "gate guards" at various facilities.

- XW276 Aerospatiale SA.341 Gazelle, preserved at Newark Air Museum – this aircraft is the prototype Gazelle flown to Britain for evaluation and testing by Westland Helicopters Ltd and the Army Air Corps
- XW844 Westland WA.341 Gazelle AH.1, preserved at Vector Aerospace Fleetlands
- XW855 Westland WA.341 Gazelle HCC.4, preserved at RAF Museum Hendon
- XW863 Westland WA.341 Gazelle HT.2, preserved at Farnborough Air Sciences Trust
- XW890 Westland WA.341 Gazelle HT.2, preserved at RNAS Yeovilton
- XX380 Westland WA.341 Gazelle AH.1, preserved as a gate guard at Wattisham Airfield
- XX381 Westland WA.341 Gazelle AH.1, preserved at Defence Sixth Form College Welbeck
- XX392 Westland WA.341 Gazelle AH.1, preserved at AAC Middle Wallop
- XX411 Westland WA.341 Gazelle AH.1, preserved at South Yorkshire Aircraft Museum
- XX444 Westland WA.341 Gazelle AH.1, preserved at Wattisham Airfield Museum
- XX457 Westland WA.341 Gazelle AH.1, preserved at East Midlands Aeropark
- XZ337 Westland WA.341 Gazelle AH.1, preserved at MOD Defence Equipment and Support headquarters at Abbey Wood
- XZ346 Westland WA.341 Gazelle AH.1, preserved at AAC Middle Wallop
- ZA737 Westland WA.341 Gazelle AH.1, preserved at Museum of Army Flying, AAC Middle Wallop
- ZB670 Westland WA.341 Gazelle AH.1, preserved at Taunton Army Reserve Centre, home of 675 (The Rifles) Squadron AAC.
- ZB672 Westland WA.341 Gazelle AH.1, preserved at Army Technical Foundation, Winchester
- G-SFTA Westland WA.341G Gazelle Srs.1, preserved at North East Land, Sea and Air Museums

A further British Gazelle is preserved in Canada:

- XZ942 Westland WA.341 Gazelle HT.2, preserved at AAC Suffield

A former Yugoslav Army example is preserved in Slovenia

- TO-001 SOKO SA341H Gazelle, c/n 157, ex-JLV '12660', preserved at the Pivka Park of Military History

== See also ==
Related development

- Aérospatiale Alouette III
- Blue Thunder (helicopter)

Aircraft of comparable role, configuration, and era

- Bell OH-58 Kiowa
- MBB Bo 105

Related lists

- List of active United Kingdom military aircraft
- List of aircraft of the Army Air Corps (United Kingdom)
- List of rotorcraft
